= The Dream of Red Mansions (2010 TV series) =

Television series

- Official poster
- Genre: Romance; Drama
- Based on: Dream of the Red Chamber by Cao Xueqin
- Directed by: Li Shaohong
- Creative director: Ye Jintian
- Starring: Yang Yang; Jiang Mengjie; Li Qin; Michelle Bai; Yao Di (actress); Zhou Caiqin; Gua Ah-leh; Ma Xiaocan
- Country of origin: China
- Original language: Mandarin
- No. of episodes: 50

Production
- Producer: Han Sanping
- Running time: 45 minutes per episode

Original release
- Release: 6 July 2010

The Dream of Red Mansions
- Intertitle
- Simplified Chinese: 红楼梦
- Traditional Chinese: 紅樓夢
- Hanyu Pinyin: Hónglóu Mèng
Transcriptions
Standard Mandarin
- Hanyu Pinyin: Hónglóu Mèng

The Dream of Red Mansions (Chinese: 紅樓夢) is a 2010 Chinese television series, produced by Han Sanping and directed by Fifth Generation director Li Shaohong. It is a new adaptation of the classic 18th century novel Dream of the Red Chamber. The series, comprising 50 episodes, made its debut on 6 July 2010 on 9 terrestrial networks across China.

== Plot ==
After her mother succumbs to illness, the sickly Lin Daiyu is sent by her father to her mother's family- the Jia household. She meets her grandmother, cousins, aunts, uncles, and other relatives. Daiyu is shy and delicate, and shares an affinity with her cousin Jia Baoyu. Jia Baoyu grew up surrounded by women, and doesn't take interest in family matters. He has an affair with his maid Hua Xiren, and dreams of several female members of the Jia household, such as Qin Keqing (sister of Baoyu's best friend Qin Zhong). He also acts playfully with his maids Qingwen and Sheyue, and his sisters and cousins Jia Tanchun, Jia Yingchun, Jia Xichun, and Shi Xiangyun.

The Jia family is corrupt, due to Baoyu's older sister Jia Yuanchun being a consort of the Emperor. Jia Yuanchun later visits her family in the Daguanyuan garden in the mansion. The Jia household also has relations with other notable families in Jinling such as the Xue and Wang households. Wang Xifeng is the aunt of Daiyu and Baoyu, and is known for being aggressive and quirky. Wang Xifeng dislikes her husband's concubines and one of them, Second Sister You commits suicide by consuming gold. Xue Baochai is Baoyu and Daiyu's fellow playmate and her brother is known for being a corrupt villain around town. Her brother Xue Pan even kills a man to buy a slave girl named Xiangling. Yet, their mother Aunt Xue doesn't interfere.

Daiyu and Baoyu gradually develop feelings for each other, and Baoyu wishes to marry her. However, his mother Lady Wang, father's mother Grandmother Jia, and other relatives instead choose Xue Baochai as his wife. Daiyu unexpectedly hears this, and falls ill. After the marriage takes place, Daiyu succumbs to grief, and Baoyu becomes disillusioned with his life. At the same time, Baoyu's older sister Yuanchun dies, and the family falls out of favor with the imperial family. Their debt and corruption scandals are known and the Jia household is severely punished. Most of the servants leave and hope is diminished.

Grandmother Jia passes away in front of the whole family after lamenting about the rise and fall of the Jia household. Wang Xifeng miserably dies, and her young daughter Jia Qiaojie is arranged to be sold as a concubine to an old man. To rescue Qiaojie, Xifeng's trusted servant Ping'er gives Qiaojie to Granny Liu- a visitor of the household several years ago. The young girls of the Jia household are forced to marry to wealthier families and suffer their demise. Baoyu leaves the family with two mysterious men who are shown at the beginning of the series. Baochai is left alone with Lady Wang, waiting for the day Baoyu comes back.

== Cast ==
- Yang Yang as Jia Baoyu
  - Yu Xiaotong as young Jia Baoyu
- Jiang Mengjie as Lin Daiyu
  - Lin Miaoke as young Lin Daiyu
- Michelle Bai as Xue Baochai
  - Li Qin as young Xue Baochai
- Yin Yezi as Xue Baoqin
  - Xu Lu as young Xue Baoqin
- Yao Di as Wang Xifeng
- Yang Mi as Qing Wen
- Zhao Liying as Xing Xiuyan
- Huang Xuan as Xue Ke
- Song Yi as Xiangling
- Zhou Caiqin as Grandmother Jia
- Ding Li as Jia Tanchun
- Ma Xiaocan as Shi Xiangyun
- Zhang Di as Jia Yingchun
- Xu Xing as Jia Xichun
- Tang Yifei as Qin Keqing
- Cheng Yuanyuan as Ping'er
- Ye Linlang as Granny Liu
- Li Yan as Xiren
- Gao Liang as Jia Lian
- Gua Ah-leh as Lady Wang
- Wu Xiaodong as Jia Yun
- Yang Junyong as Jia Rong
- Wang Fuli as Lady Xing
- Jia Ni as Lady You
- Gao Yang as Miaoyu
- Cai Feiyun as Yuanyang
- Xu Huanshan as Jia Zheng
- Xuan Lu as Xue Yan
- Kan Qingzi as She Yue

== Production ==
The series was one of the most expensive Chinese TV series ever made at RMB118 million (US$17.55 million). Unlike the 1987 version, this series adapts the Cheng-Gao version. The 2010 series reproduces large segments of the book's pre-modern Beijing dialogue, often in full. Another feature is its heavy use of a male voice-over reciting much of the book's narrative.

The director was originally slated to be Hu Mei, but Hu clashed with the producers over the cast selection, and was replaced by Li Shaohong in October 2007. The 2010 TV series faced controversy over its cast, the stylized, kunqu-inspired hairdo, as well as a generally negative press after its July 6 debut.

== Reception ==
The 2010 remake was controversial from the start, since the 1987 version was highly acclaimed and few critics were convinced a modern version will match its predecessor. Following a highly publicized casting call, director Hu Mei was replaced by Li Shaohong in 2007. Li courted more controversy by adopting a stylized kunqu-inspired hairstyle (dubbed "coined heads" 铜钱头/銅錢頭 (Tóngqián tóu) by netizens) for her female cast members, as advised by Hong Kong art director Ye Jintian. Many viewers find the hairstyle grotesquely unrealistic.

Response to the series after its debut was mixed, but was largely negative. It was panned by some newspapers, with one referring to it as a pre-modern version of the pop idol drama Meteor Garden. Audience expressed dismay over its use of music, and the use of make-up was also criticized. Some Redologist scholars voiced their disappointment with the somewhat juvenile acting and script adaptation. Director Li was under enormous pressure owing to the negative feedback and broke down during a Beijing press conference held on 7 July 2010, her birthday.

== Awards and nominations ==
| Year | Award | Category | Nominated work | Result | Ref. |
|---|---|---|---|---|---|
| 2010 | 2nd China TV Drama Awards | Best Producer | Li Xiaowan | Won | |
| 2010 | 2nd China TV Drama Awards | Best New Actress | Jiang Mengjie | Won | |
| 2011 | Seoul International Drama Awards | Popular Actor Award | Yu Xiaotong | Won | |
