= A Dream of Red Mansions (1988 film series) =

Serial feature film by Xie Tieli

- Chinese: 红楼梦
- Directed by: Xie Tieli; Zhao Yuan
- Written by: Novel: Cao Xueqin; Adapted screenplay: Xie Tieli; Xie Fensong
- Starring: Xia Qin; Tao Huimin; Fu Yiwei; Liu Xiaoqing
- Release dates: 1988 (Parts 1 & 2); 1989 (Parts 3–6)
- Running time: 748 minutes (total)
- Country: China
- Language: Mandarin

A Dream of Red Mansions (Chinese: 红楼梦) is a Chinese serial feature film produced by Beijing Film Studio, released in 6 parts (8 episodes) between 1988 and 1989. Directed by Xie Tieli (谢铁骊) and Zhao Yuan (赵元), it is a cinematic adaptation of the 18th-century Chinese novel of the same name. The film took two years to prepare and three years to shoot, and remains, at 735 minutes, the longest ever made in the People's Republic of China.

Lead actresses Xia Qin and Tao Huimin were both Yue opera artistes, with Xia Qin taking on the role of the male lead Jia Baoyu. The film won Best Director, Best Supporting Actress (Lin Moyu), Best Act Direction and Best Costume Design at the 10th Golden Rooster Awards.

== Cast ==
Many of the actors were Chinese opera actors: Tao Huimin, Li Yongyong and He Saifei were all professional Yue opera actresses from the Zhejiang Xiaobaihua Yue Opera Troupe; Xing Jinsha (or Ying Kam Sha) was a Kunqu actress; Yuan Mei was a Huangmei opera actress; and Zhao Lirong was a Ping opera actress. Xia Qin, Ji Qilin, Li Lingyu and He Qing had all undergone years of training in Chinese opera.

- Xia Qin (夏钦) as Jia Baoyu
- Tao Huimin (陶慧敏) as Lin Daiyu
- Fu Yiwei as Xue Baochai
- Lin Moyu (林默予) as Grandmother Jia
- Liu Xiaoqing as Wang Xifeng
- Ma Xiaoqing (马晓晴) as Shi Xiangyun
- Li Xiuming as Jia Yuanchun
- Yang Shihua (杨世华) as Jia Yingchun
- Zeng Dan (曾丹) as Jia Tanchun
- Ding Lan (丁岚) as Jia Xichun
- Zhang Jie (章杰) as Jia Zheng
- Wang Guangquan (王光权) (early) and Ji Qilin (later) as Jia Lian
- Shi Xian (石冼) as Jia Zhen
- Zhou Jieyu (周杰宇) as Jia She
- Wang Zhenrong (王振荣) as Jia Jing
- Zhang Jian (章健) as Jia Rong
- Shan Zenghong (闪增宏) as Jia Rui
- Xing Jinsha (邢金莎) (early) and Zhang Lei (张蕾) (later) as Hua Xiren
- Li Yongyong (李勇勇) as Qingwen
- Xu Jiequn (许杰群) as Yuanyang
- Ni Xuehua (倪雪华) as Ping'er
- Tong Xin (童欣) as Xiangling
- Chen Hong as Zijuan
- Zhao Lirong as Granny Liu
- Wang Minyi (王敏宜) as Lady Wang
- Yuan Mei (袁玫) as Aunt Xue
- He Qing (何晴) as Qin Keqing
- Xing Hong (邢红) as Li Wan
- He Saifei as Miaoyu
- Lin Xiaojie (林小解) as Xue Pan
- Chen Hong (陈虹) as Second Sister You
- Li Lingyu as Third Sister You
- Fan Weihua (范卫华) as Xia Jin'gui
- Zhang Baoqiu (张葆秋) as Concubine Zhao
- Li Fazeng (李法曾) as Jia Yucun

== Plot summary ==
The film adapts the major events and incidents of the novel. The last part (Part Six) is essentially an abridged adaptation of the Cheng-Gao ending.

== See also ==
- The Dream of Red Mansions (2010 TV series)
