= Dream of the Red Chamber (1987 TV series) =

Chinese name
- Traditional Chinese: 紅樓夢
- Simplified Chinese: 红楼梦
Transcriptions
Standard Mandarin
- Hanyu Pinyin: Hónglóu Mèng
- Genre: Historical, romantic
- Based on: Dream of the Red Chamber by Cao Xueqin
- Written by: Zhou Lei; Liu Genglu; Zhou Ling
- Directed by: Wang Fulin
- Starring: Ouyang Fenqiang as Jia Baoyu; Chen Xiaoxu as Lin Daiyu; Zhang Li as Xue Baochai; Deng Jie as Wang Xifeng
- Country of origin: China
- Original language: Mandarin
- No. of seasons: 1
- No. of episodes: 36

Production
- Executive producer: Wang Fulin
- Production location: China
- Production company: China Central Television

Original release
- Network: CCTV
- Release: 1987

Dream of the Red Chamber (Chinese: 红楼梦; pinyin: Hónglóu Mèng), first released in 1987, is a television series produced by CCTV adapted from the classic 18th century Chinese novel Dream of the Red Chamber. It gained enormous popularity for its music, cast, and plot adaptation. It was first filmed in Beijing in Mandarin, then the series was dubbed in Cantonese and Shanghainese. The series is 36 episodes long.

The TV series is regarded by many within China as being a near-definitive adaptation of the novel. A TV remake of the novel started airing in 2010; however, much objection was raised over the unorthodox costume design and other contested interpretations.

== Plot summary ==
The series follows the plot of Cao Xueqin's novel Dream of the Red Chamber. The series begins with the mother-less child, Lin Daiyu - whose beauty and intelligence surpasses all - moving into the family compound of her maternal grandmother in the capital. There, the child meets numerous relatives, one of whom is Jia Baoyu, her mother's nephew and male protagonist. Baoyu was born with a piece of jade in his mouth and, so, is treated like a fragile egg and spoiled by his grandmother. He often spends his time with his female cousins and maids instead of tending to his studies. In addition to Daiyu, one of the cousins he spends time with the most is the tactful Xue Baochai.

As the story goes on, Baoyu and Daiyu eventually fall in love with each other, but Daiyu is not very well liked by the family and, instead, the family members favor Baochai. Eventually, Baoyu and Baochai are forced to marry, and Daiyu dies of a broken heart. The series ends with the Emperor confiscating the Jia family properties and the family members scattered, some to their own tragic end. While some of the members do eventually reunite, Baoyu leaves to become a monk.

== Episodes ==
The serial contains 36 episodes spanning the novel.

- 1. Daiyu Parted With Her Father and Went to the Capital (林黛玉别父进京都)
- 2. Baoyu, Daiyu, and Baochai's First Meeting at the Hall of Glorious Pageant (宝黛钗初会荣庆堂)
- 3. Granny Liu Pays Her First Visit to the Jung Mansion (刘姥姥一进荣国府)
- 4. Daiyu Feels Slight Jealous While Meeting Baoyu at Baochai's Home (探宝钗黛玉半含酸)
- 5. Xifeng Sets a Vicious Trap for a Lover (王熙凤毒设相思局)
- 6. Xifeng Helps to Manage Affairs at the Ning Mansion (王熙凤协理宁国府)
- 7. Literary Talent Tested by Composing Inscriptions for Grandview Garden (大观园试才题对额)
- 8. Jung Mansion Had the Imperial Consort's Visitation on the Lantern Festival (荣国府归省庆元宵)
- 9. A Sweet Girl Shows Deep Feeling One Quiet Day (意绵绵静日玉生香)
- 10. A Song Awakes Baoyu to Esoteric Truths (听曲文宝玉悟禅机)
- 11. Meeting a Nightmare in Seeking After Favor (为争宠姐弟遭魔魇)
- 12. Daiyu Weeps at Falling Petals (埋香冢飞燕泣残红)
- 13. The Fortune Enjoys Deep Fortune and Long Life (享福人福深还祷福)
- 14. Chin-chuan Dies a Heroic Death in Shame (含耻辱情烈死金钏)
- 15. Baoyu was Beaten For Flirting (弄唇舌宝玉遭笞挞)
- 16. Granny Liu Pays a Visit to Grandview Garden (刘姥姥嬉游大观园)
- 17. Xifeng Taken by Surprise Gives Ways to Jealousy (变生不测凤姐泼醋)
- 18. Yuanyang Vows Never to Marry (鸳鸯女誓绝鸳鸯偶)
- 19. White Snow and Red Plum-Blossom in the Glassy World (琉璃世界白雪红梅)
- 20. Plucky Qingwen Mends a Peacock-Feather Cape in Bed (勇晴雯病补雀金裘)
- 21. An Evening Banquet on the Lantern Festival in the Jung Mansion (荣国府元宵开夜宴)
- 22. Ping'er Wields Authority to Right a Wrong (判冤决狱平儿行权)
- 23. Artful Zijuan Tests Baoyu's Feelings (慧紫鹃情辞试忙玉)
- 24. Girls Feast at Night in Happy Red Court (寿怡红群芳开夜宴)
- 25. The Profligate Secretly Takes Second Sister Yu as a Concubine (贾二舍偷娶尤二姨)
- 26. Xifeng in Jealousy Makes a Scene in the Ning Mansion (酸凤姐大闹宁国府)
- 27. Lady Xing Feels Wronged and Puts Xifeng in Wrong (嫌隙人有心生嫌隙)
- 28. Strange Omen Occurs at Night Banquet (开夜宴异兆发悲音)
- 29. Spoony Childe Writes a Dirge on Cottonrose Hibiscus (痴公子杜撰芙蓉诔)
- 30. Drifting Away of Fair Maidens from Grandview Garden (大观园诸芳流散)
- 31. Spiritual Jade was Stolen During a Bustling Feast (家宅乱误窃通灵)
- 32. Grieving Over Tanchun's Departure to Marry Far from Home (伤离别探春远嫁)
- 33. Daiyu is Shocked by Bad News and Dies (惊噩耗黛玉魂归)
- 34. Forced Xifeng Resigned Herself to a Fate Spread East of Bed-Curtain (强英雄凤姐知命)
- 35. Collapsed Mansion Comes to an End (大厦倾公府末路)
- 36. A Vast and White Expanse of Immerse Universe (白茫茫厚地高天)

== Cast ==
- Ouyang Fenqiang as Jia Baoyu
- Chen Xiaoxu as Lin Daiyu
- Zhang Li as Xue Baochai
- Cheng Mei as Jia Yuanchun
- Dongfang Wenying as Jia Tanchun
- Guo Xiaozhen as Shi Xiangyun
- Ji Yu (former name Ji Peijie) as Miaoyu
- Deng Jie as Wang Xifeng
- Jin Lili as Jia Yingchun
- Zhang Lei as Qin Keqing
- Shen Ling as Ping'er
- An Wen (former name Zhang Jinglin) as Qingwen
- Yuan Mei as Xiren
- Gao Liang as Jia Lian
- Zhou Xianzhen as Lady Wang
- Wu Xiaodong as Jia Yun
- Yang Junyong as Jia Rong

== Accolades ==
Award	Category	Nominee	Result	Ref.
7th Feitian Awards	Outstanding Television Series	Dream of the Red Chamber	Won	
7th Feitian Awards	Outstanding Supporting Actress	Deng Jie	Won	
5th Golden Eagle Awards	Best Television Series	Dream of the Red Chamber	Won	
5th Golden Eagle Awards	Best Supporting Actress	Deng Jie	Won	
China TV Drama Awards	Grand Prix	Dream of the Red Chamber	Won	

== Reception and soundtrack ==
The 1987 series was initially somewhat controversial as few Redologists believed a TV adaptation could do the novel full justice. Producer and director Wang Fulin's decision in employing non-professional youths was vindicated as the TV series gained enormous popularity in China.

The series' success owes much to composer Wang Liping (王立平). He set many of the novel's classical verses to music, taking as long as four years to deliberate and complete his compositions.

=== Post-broadcast activities ===
On December 6, 2003, the CCTV-3 program "Art Life" recorded the episode "Art Life - Reunion of Dream of the Red Chamber," directed by Wang Fulin, written by Zhou Ling, produced by Dai Linfeng, starring Ouyang Fenqiang, Chen Xiaoxu, Deng Jie, Dongfang Wenying, along with over 70 other guests including actors and behind-the-scenes staff, revisiting various stories from the production of this version of the TV series. During the program, Zhang Li, who portrayed Xue Baochai and singer Chen Li, who had been absent from the public eye for a long time, returned to the spotlight. Additionally, due to the secrecy maintained by the program recording staff, guests were unaware of each other's presence before the show, resulting in many surprises during the program. The episode premiered on CCTV-3 on January 9, 2004.

On December 7, the day after the program recording, the cast and crew revisited the filming location of the Daguanyuan, where they were deeply moved, reminiscing about the series of stories from twenty years ago during the filming and in life.

On June 1, 2007, a memorial service for Chen Xiaoxu, who portrayed Lin Daiyu (she died on May 13 of that year), was held at the Daguanyuan in Beijing. Ouyang Fenqiang, Zhou Ling, Deng Jie, Zhang Li, Wu Xiaodong, Sha Yuhua, and other main creative personnel of the production attended to mourn.

On September 26 and October 10, 2012, Beijing TV aired "Stars of Film and Television Journey" where the cast of Dream of the Red Chamber reunited.

On December 2, 2012, Beijing TV's "Watch Beijing Drama" broadcast "Dreams of the Red Chamber" - Memories of the Red Mansion.

On December 30, 2012, and January 6, 2013, CCTV-4 aired "Chinese Literature and Art" presenting "Unfinished Love in Dream of the Red Chamber".

On March 15 and 22, 2017, Tianjin TV aired "Gathering of the Elite" featuring characters from Dream of the Red Chamber.

On June 17, 2017, "1987, Our Dream of the Red Chamber Concert," curated by Ouyang Fenqiang, took place at the Great Hall of the People, attended by over a hundred actors who had been absent for many years or living overseas.

On July 23 and 30, 2017, CCTV-8 broadcast "Talking about Drama" featuring the cast of Dream of the Red Chamber.

On September 3, 2017, the first Tourism Industry Development Conference was held in Zhengding County, Shijiazhuang City, featuring a themed concert for the 1987 version of the TV series Dream of the Red Chamber.

On September 9 and 16, 2017, CCTV aired "Chinese Literature and Art" paying tribute to the classic: the 1987 TV series Dream of the Red Chamber.
