= Dream of the Red Chamber (1996 TV series) =

1996 Taiwanese television series

Dream of the Red Chamber is a Taiwanese TV series based on Cao Xueqin's acclaimed 18th-century novel of the same name. The novel is considered to be one of the Four Great Classical Novels of Chinese literature. Filmed mostly in Shanghai, the TV series was first broadcast on Chinese Television System from November 1996 to October 1997.

== Cast ==
- Chung Pen-wei as Jia Baoyu
- Chang Yu-yen as Lin Daiyu
- Tsou Lin-lin as Xue Baochai
- Tang Lan-hua as Jia Yuanchun
- Mao Hsun-jung as Jia Tanchun
- Wang Yu-ling & Kuo Huei-wen as Shi Xiangyun (Wang Yu-ling died in 1993 without finishing her scenes)
- Hu Huiling as Miaoyu
- Hsu Kuei-ying as Wang Xifeng
- Lee Hsing-yao as Jia Yingchun
- Chang Chiung-tzu as Qin Keqing
- Tung Wen-fen as Ping'er
- Yang Chieh-mei as Qingwen
- Hsiao Ai as Xiren
- Hsu Nai-lin as Jia Lian
- Fu Lei as Jia Zheng
- Han Hsiang-chin as Lady Wang
- Hsu Chien-yu as Jia Yun
- Wen Shuai as Jia Rong
- Fan Hung-hsuan as Jia Zhen
- Liu Yueh-ti as Jia Rui
- Chen Hao as Jia Huan
- Sze Yu as Jiang Yuhan

== Awards and nominations ==
1999 Golden Bell Awards

- Nominated—Best TV Series
