= The Dream of the Red Chamber (1977 film) =

1977 Hong Kong film by Li Han-Hsiang

- DVD cover for The Dream of the Red Chamber (1977)
- Chinese: 金玉良缘红楼梦
- Directed by: Li Han-hsiang
- Screenplay by: Li Han-Hsiang
- Based on: Dream of the Red Chamber by Cao Xueqin
- Produced by: Run Run Shaw; Mona Fong
- Starring: Brigitte Lin; Sylvia Chang; Michelle Yim; Ouyang Sha-fei; Yueh Hua; Lai Wang; Deborah Dik
- Cinematography: Lin Chao
- Edited by: Chiang Hsing-Lung
- Music by: Wang Fu-ling
- Production company: Shaw Brothers
- Release date: 26 October 1977 (Hong Kong)
- Running time: 108 minutes
- Country: Hong Kong
- Language: Mandarin

The Dream of the Red Chamber (Traditional Chinese: 金玉良緣紅樓夢; Simplified Chinese: 金玉良缘红楼梦) is a 1977 film adaptation of the 18th century Chinese novel of the same name by Cao Xueqin. It stars Brigitte Lin as protagonist Jia Baoyu, and Sylvia Chang as his cousin Lin Daiyu. The film is told in the style of Huangmei Opera, and follows the style's tradition of cross-gender acting, where a female actor portrays a male character. This is the second adaptation of the novel from the Shaw Brothers, the first being Dream of the Red Chamber (1963) starring Betty Loh Ti.

The film was nominated for two categories at the 15th Golden Horse Awards, and won Best Art Direction.

== Plot ==
In Qing Dynasty China, the Jia family receives the frail adolescent Lin Daiyu after her mother passes away. She meets her cousin Baoyu, the heir of the Jia family, who instantly takes a liking towards her. They spend their childhood around each other and form a close bond, often reading literature and reciting poetry together. As they grow older, Baoyu starts flirting with Daiyu.

Years later, their other cousin, Xue Baochai, arrives to live with them. She catches Baoyu's attention with her knowledge of weiqi, which causes Daiyu to feel jealous, marking the start of her spiral into melancholia. Baoyu assures Daiyu that his feelings towards her hasn't changed despite spending time with Baochai.

Baoyu has a strained relationship with his father, Jia Zheng, who expects him to study hard and pass his exams to become a government official. When he aids the escape of the prince's favourite actor, Jia Zheng is pressured to find him, as to avoid unnecessary troubles with the prince. Because of that, Baoyu is beaten by his father, but being the beloved and spoiled young master of the family, the servants, Lady Wang, and Grandmother Jia come to his rescue. While recovering from his injuries, Baochai visits and scolds him for befriending an actor, to his displeasure. In contrast, Daiyu's visit was brief yet marked with tears and affection.

Daiyu's spiral continues when she sees Baochai leaving Baoyu's residence one night. She decides to ignore Baoyu, who seeks her out and reassures her of his feelings. Unconvinced, she continues to avoid him.

When Baoyu tries to visit Daiyu one day, her maid, Zijuan, plays a prank on him. She convinces him that Daiyu is moving out, which triggers a manic breakdown, and he demands Grandmother Jia to not let Daiyu leave. She complies, though later plots with Lady Wang and Xifeng to marry him to Baochai, but trick him into thinking he was marrying Daiyu. They justify that their act was to help cure Baoyu's madness, and to continue the Jia bloodline as Daiyu is too frail to give birth, while Baochai is well-endowed to bear children.

Despite instructed to keep it a secret, a maid tells Daiyu about the wedding, which further worsens her physical and mental health. Back in her residence, she reminisces their love and grieves tearfully, finally succumbing to her illness when she hears the wedding banquet echoing across the mansion.

At the wedding, Baoyu playfully lifts his new bride's veil, and is devastated to find Baochai behind it. He cries and begs his elders to allow him and Daiyu to be together, but is cut short when the news of Daiyu's death reaches the main house. At Daiyu's funeral, the only attendees are Zijuan and Baoyu, the latter mourning her death, his laments full of loss and regret, intertwined with declarations of love.

At dawn, palace officials arrive to deliver the emperor's decree. Jia Zheng is removed from his government post, and the Jia family's assets are confiscated for his inability to retain the emperor's trust. Baoyu leaves the Jia mansion and becomes a Buddhist monk.

== Cast and characters ==
- Brigitte Lin as Jia Baoyu:
  The heir of the wealthy Jia family. Baoyu is well-loved and spoiled by the women in the family, even gaining favour with the servants. In her book 'Clouds Going to Clouds', Lin noted in the chapter '我也梦红楼' (Translation: I Too Dream of the Red Mansion) that this was the most important film in her career, partly because it was her only project with director Li Han-hsiang. It is also her favourite film out of the 100 films she's starred in. Chien Yung-Yung (容蓉) provided singing vocals for the character.
- Sylvia Chang as Lin Daiyu:
  Baoyu's younger cousin. She has a frail body and consumes medicine regularly to improve her health. Liu Yun (刘韵) provided singing vocals for the character.
- Michelle Yim as Xue Baochai:
  Baoyu's older cousin. Baochai is cunning, intelligent, and socially popular. Yim's screentime was reduced because of scheduling conflicts, as she was filming CTV's Dream of the Red Chamber TV drama at the same time, also playing Xue Baochai.
- Deborah Dik as Zijuan:
  Daiyu's loyal servant, given to Daiyu as a gift when she first arrived at the Rong Manor. Dik was initially considered for the role of Lin Daiyu, but preferred to play Zijuan. Her role was subsequently written with more importance, giving her character more screen time.
- Lai Wang as Grandmother Jia:
  The matriarch of the Jia family.
- Ouyang Sha-fei as Lady Wang:
  Baoyu's mother. Ouyang previously played the character Xiren in the 1944 version of Dream of the Red Chamber.
- Yueh Hua as Jia Zheng:
  The head of the Jia family and Baoyu's father.
- Chin Hu as Wang Xifeng:
  Baoyu's cunning cousin-in-law.
- Niu Niu as Jiang Yuhan/Qiguan:
  An actor who befriends Baoyu. Niu Niu's character appears briefly for a song number, and is the only other female actor playing a male character in the film, besides Lin's Jia Baoyu.

== Production ==
Director Li Han-hsiang initially approached Brigitte Lin for the role of Lin Daiyu, after seeing her in period costume. Sylvia Chang was initially cast as Jia Baoyu, but swapped roles with Lin when Li saw the latter "...walking down a hallway in jeans and a striped shirt, looking down, and was inspired to recast her, feeling she had the look of a classic scholarly, handsome man.". Additionally, Lin was several inches taller than Chang, further convincing Li to recast Lin as Baoyu instead.

== Soundtrack ==
The film's soundtrack was arranged and conducted by Ichirō Saitō, and composed by Wang Fu-ling. Song Yu and Xiang Zi wrote the lyrics. Actress and Huangmei Opera singer Chien Yung-Yung (容蓉) provided the vocals for Lin's Jia Baoyu, and singer Liu Yun (刘韵) for Chang's Lin Daiyu. The tracks contain spoken dialogue from the film. A studio recording version was released in 2005. Several tracks on the studio album were not present in the film version, indicating that the scenes were either not shot, or cut from the final edit.

The vinyl was released in 1977 under EMI (Hong Kong) Limited in Hong Kong, while the CD was released in Singapore, Malaysia, and Hong Kong in the late 1980s.

=== Track Listing (Film version) ===
No.	Title	Length
1.	"泣残红"	3:35
2.	"焚稿"	5:44
3.	"葬花"	2:09
4.	"为什么"	8:13
5.	"试玉(一)"	3:28
6.	"试玉(二)"	3:14
7.	"读西厢"	3:15
8.	"结同欢"	1:51
9.	"百媚姣"	11:51
10.	"偷梁换柱"	4:21
11.	"赠帕"	4:27
12.	"问紫鹃"	2:59
13.	"美玉无瑕"	6:18
14.	"红楼梦觉"	3:33

=== Track Listing (Studio version) ===
No.	Title	Length
1.	"序幕"	1:25
2.	"似曾相识"	1:12
3.	"藕香榭"	2:29
4.	"红豆词"	1:20
5.	"赠帕泣残红"	4:24
6.	"葬花"	2:15
7.	"试玉"	2:33
8.	"问心"	1:45
9.	"打开眉上锁"	6:07
10.	"焚稿"	6:42
11.	"金玉良缘"	1:14
12.	"叮咛"	3:51
13.	"偷天换日"	2:13
14.	"哭灵"	5:29
15.	"红楼梦觉"	1:39

== Reviews ==
Writing for Far East Films, Rob Danial gave the film a 3/5 rating, observing that the film is a visually lush but narratively unbalanced remake of the Qing‑period classic. Director Li Han‑hsiang relies heavily on luxuriant visuals—the eternally falling flowers, lavish period sets, and colour‑enhanced cinematography are reminiscent of an operatic dreamworld. This sensory richness elevates otherwise thin dramatic material, but the film’s focus on the central romantic triangle comes at the cost of sidelining the novel’s broader tapestry of characters and social nuance. As the Far East Films review notes, the “slender story … seems to have little substance to lose,” and Li’s staging can feel static, with frequent wide shots and overused zooms that dampen emotional immediacy.

Elizabeth Kerr from The Hollywood Reporter notes that Brigitte Lin's career-launching turn in the 1977 Shaw Brothers film version of The Dream of the Red Chamber was the starting point of her cultishly iconic gender-bending reputation in films. As the sensitive male hero Jia Baoyu, Lin brought the character a mix of youthful uncertainty and emotional complexity that would become a signature of her career. In spite of the movie's streamlined storyline and stylized musical treatment, Lin's performance was both bold and subtle, hinting at the command and presence she would develop later in classics such as Peking Opera Blues and Ashes of Time. Her strong presence brought the film above its melodramatic origins to make her a cultural icon who defied gender conventions with elegance and strength.

EasternKicks's Stephen Palmer gave the film a 2.5/5 rating, praising the film's aesthetics, but doubted the musical drama's ability to capture the interest of casual viewers and western audiences due to its cultural nuances, Huangmei Opera style performance, and reliance on the audience having prior knowledge of the novel's story. He gave praise to both Brigitte Lin and Sylvia Chang's performance, and commended director Li Han-hsiang's filming style and the film's art direction, comparing its colours to silk screen painting.

== Awards ==
Award	Date of ceremony	Category	Nominees	Result
15th Golden Horse Awards	31 October 1978	Best Cinematography	Lin Chao	Nominated
15th Golden Horse Awards	31 October 1978	Best Art Direction	Chen Ching-shen	Won
