= Dream of the Red Chamber (disambiguation) =

Dream of the Red Chamber is an 18th-century Chinese novel written by Cao Xueqin.

Dream of the Red Chamber may also refer to the following adaptations for film or TV:

- The Dream of Red Mansions (1927 film), a Chinese film directed by Ren Pengnian and Yu Boyan
- Dream of the Red Chamber (1944 film), a Chinese film directed by Bu Wancang
- The Dream of the Red Chamber (1977 film), a Hong Kong film directed by Li Han-Hsiang
- Dream of the Red Chamber (1987 TV series), a China Central Television series based on the novel
- A Dream of Red Mansions (1988 film series), a Chinese film series based on the novel
- Dream of the Red Chamber (1996 TV series), a Taiwanese TV series produced by Chinese Television System
- The Dream of Red Mansions (2010 TV series), the revival of the 1987 series
- Dream of the Red Chamber (opera), an English-language opera by Chinese American composer Bright Sheng world premiered in 2016 by the San Francisco Opera

== See also ==
- Dream of the Red Chamber Award, a Chinese-language novel prize presented by Hong Kong Baptist University
- Redology, academic study of the novel
