= Jia Xichun =

Character in Dream of the Red Chamber

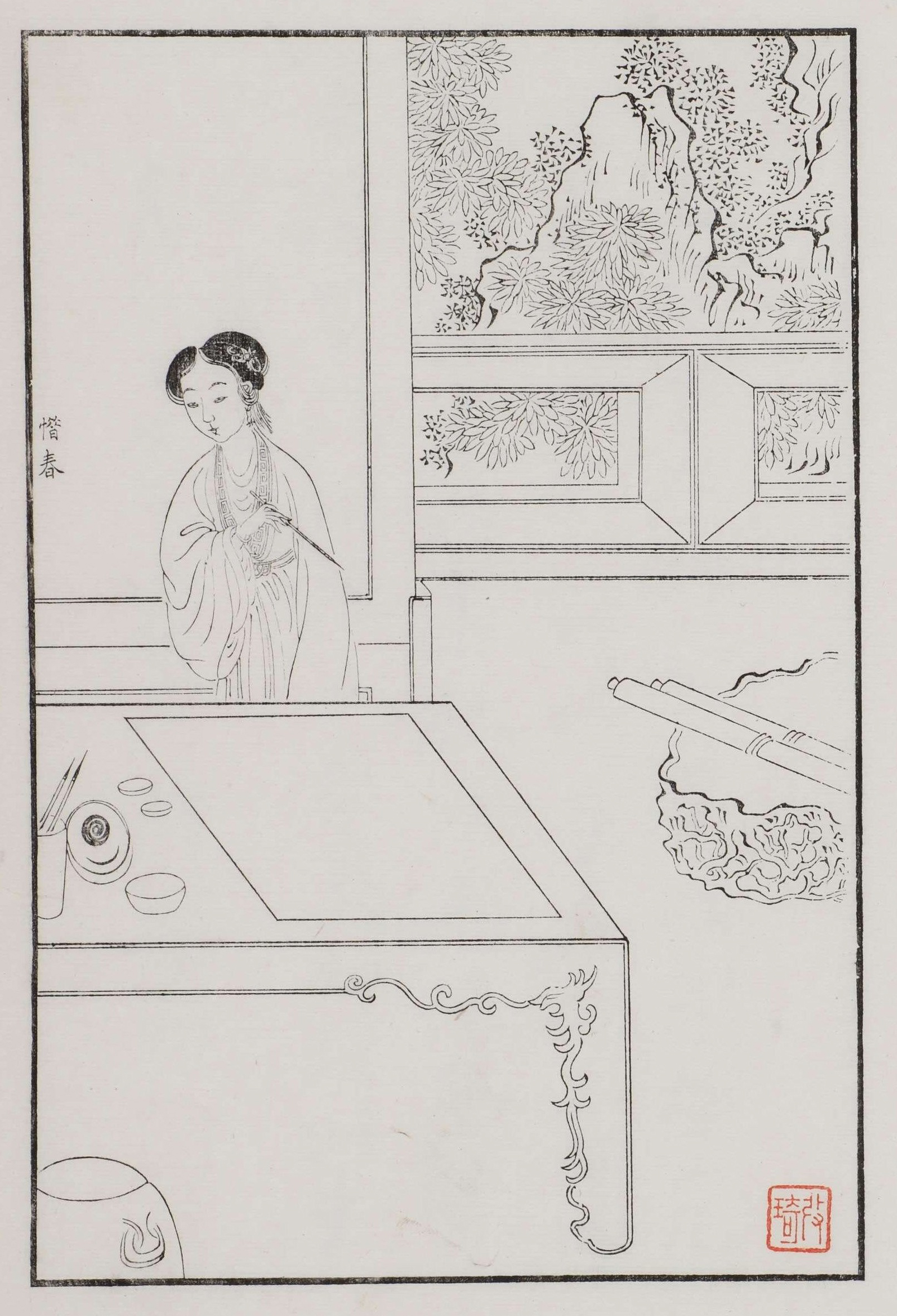
Jia Xichun

Jia Xichun (Chinese: 賈惜春; pinyin: Jiǎ Xīchūn, rendered Compassion Spring in Chi-chen Wang's translation) is a primary character in the 18th century Chinese novel Dream of the Red Chamber.

== Character background ==
Xichun's name translates to "cherish spring". She is the youngest of the quartet of "Springs", depicted as a young teenager or pre-teen for most of the book.

Xichun is the second youngest of Jinling Twelve Beauties. Her father is Jia Jing, a son of Jia Daihua. She is the sister of Jia Zhen, de facto head of the Ningguo House, and Baoyu's third cousin. When she was little, her mother died, and Lady Wang brought her to live in the Rongguo Mansion. A devout Buddhist, she is religious since a small child and also a gifted painter.

== Storylines ==
When Granny Liu visits the Prospect Garden, the Dowager commissions her to make a painting of the Garden for the guest.

After the fall of the house of Jia, Xichun becomes a Buddhist nun in place of Miaoyu.
