= Xiren (disambiguation) =

Xiren may refer to:

- Bao Zheng (999–1062), whose courtesy name was Xiren (希仁), an official of the Northern Song dynasty
- Hua Xiren (花襲人), a character from the classic Chinese novel Dream of the Red Chamber
- Nan Xiren (南希仁), a character from the Chinese wuxia novel The Legend of Condor Heroes
