= Yin Yezi =

Chinese actress (born 1991)

- 殷叶子
- Born: June 25, 1991 (age 35); Wuhan, Hubei, China
- Education: Central Academy of Drama
- Occupation: Actress
- Years active: 2007–present

Chinese name
- Traditional Chinese: 殷葉子
- Simplified Chinese: 殷叶子
Transcriptions
Standard Mandarin
- Hanyu Pinyin: Yīn Yèzǐ

Yin Yezi (Chinese: 殷叶子; born 25 June 1991) is a Chinese actress.

Yin is noted for her roles as Xue Baoqin and Zhao Meiran in the television series The Dream of Red Mansions (2010) and Meteor Shower (2009) respectively.

== Life ==
Yin was born in Wuhan, Hubei on June 25, 1991. Yin secondary studied at Wuhan Song and Dance Theatre, and she graduated from Central Academy of Drama.

Yin made her acting debut in Life of True Love, playing Jin Ling.

Yin had a cameo appearance in Meteor Shower (2009), a romantic comedy television series adaptation based on Japanese manga Hana Yori Dango. That same year, she made her film debut in Flirting Scholar 2, playing Bao Xiang, a film starring Huang Xiaoming, Zhang Jingchu, Natalis Chan, Richie Ren and Zhou Libo.

In 2010, Yin co-starred with Jiang Mengjie, Yao Di and Michelle Bai in the historical television series The Dream of Red Mansions as Xue Baoqin.

In 2011, Yin starred in a television series called National Defense Students with Zhang Shanqi and Gao Ziqi.

In 2012, Yin starred in the romantic comedy television series Treasure Mother Treasure Girl, she received mixed reviews.

In 2013, Yin starred in two television series, The Lure of Cloud and Love Is Not For Sale.

In 2014, Yin starred in the ancient costume comedy The Investiture of the Gods, adapted from Xu Zhonglin's classical novel of the same title.

== Works ==
=== Film ===
Year	English Title	Chinese Title	Role	Notes
2009	Flirting Scholar 2	唐伯虎点秋香2	Bao Xiang	
2011	My Fair Lady	窈“跳”淑女	Gloria	
2014	Scent	香气		
2015	Fight Against Landlords	斗地主		

=== Television ===
Year	English Title	Chinese Title	Role	Notes
2007	Life of True Love	真情人生	Jin Ling	
2009	Meteor Shower	一起来看流星雨	Zhao Meiran	
2010	The Dream of Red Mansions	新红楼梦	Xue Baoqin	
2011	National Defense Students	国防生	Jiang Ruolin	
2012	Treasure Mother Treasure Girl	宝贝妈妈宝贝女	Lian Huishan	
2013	The Lure of Cloud	云上的诱惑	Ai Shanshan	
2013	Love Is Not For Sale	棋逢对手	Tian Sisi	
2014	The Investiture of the Gods	封神英雄榜	He Lan	
2014		北上海1950	Xiao Lingdang	
2014		远大前程	Su Xiaoman	
