= Daguanyuan =

Fictional location

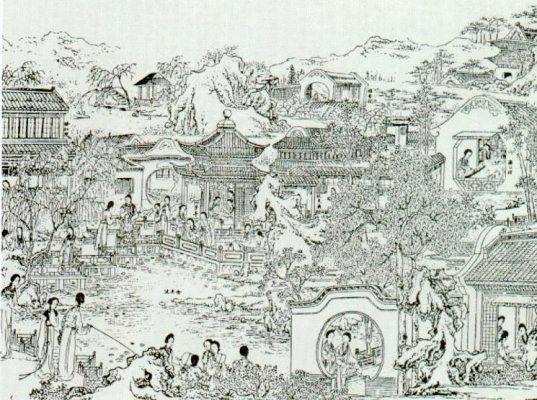
An 1889 printed depiction of Daguanyuan

The Daguanyuan (simplified Chinese: 大观园; traditional Chinese: 大觀園; pinyin: Dàguānyuán), variously translated as the Grand View Garden, Prospect Garden or Grand Prospect Garden, is a massive landscaped interior garden in the classic 18th century Chinese novel Dream of the Red Chamber, built within the compounds of the Rongguo Mansion. It is the setting for much of the story. The spectacular beauty of the garden was encapsulated by a quote in the novel, that "the mountains and waters [of Daguanyuan] were built to capture the essence of all of the sceneries in the heaven and on earth."

Built in chapters 16 and 17 of the novel, it was the site of Jia Yuanchun's first visit home as an Imperial Concubine. At that time, music and lights decorated the place so it was fit for Imperial patronage. After Yuanchun leaves, the Garden is made at her own request the home of her brother, half-sister, sister-in-law, and cousins. Being very elegant and peaceful, it is a perfect home for Baoyu and the girls. Granny Liu also pays a visit to Prospect Garden in chapters 40 and 41. She is very impressed at the vegetation, water, layout, and life in the Garden. As a gift, the Dowager commissions Xichun to make a painting of the Garden for Granny Liu to take back home. It is here that the nun Miaoyu is met by many.

Eventually, the young women in Baoyu's life drift away from the Garden. Yingchun is married off to her death. Tanchun is also married, but to the frontier (in the Cheng-Gao version). Shi Xiangyun also marries, while Baochai marries Baoyu and is abandoned. Lin Daiyu dies of grief and Li Wan moves into the inner apartments of the Rongguo Mansion.

When the Jia family estates are confiscated, the Garden is ransacked. Being farther from the inner apartments, it is also destroyed by the imperial guards.

Depictions of Daguanyuan in Dream of the Red Chamber from a series of paintings by artist Sun Wen (1818–1904)
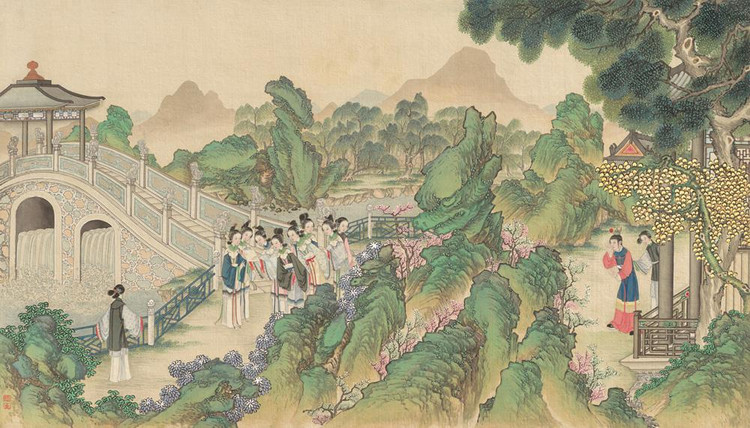

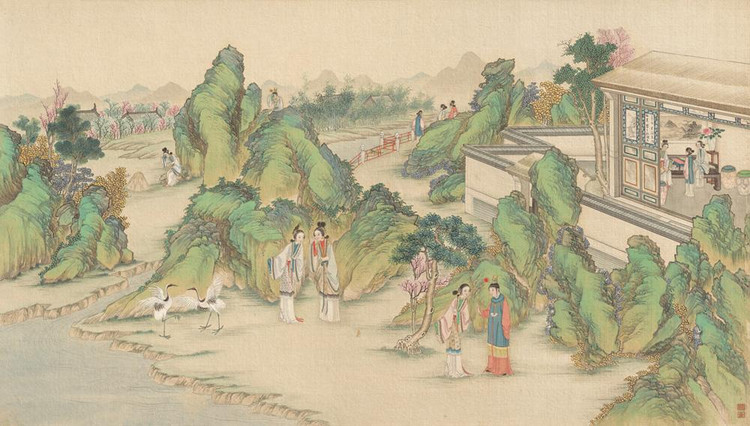

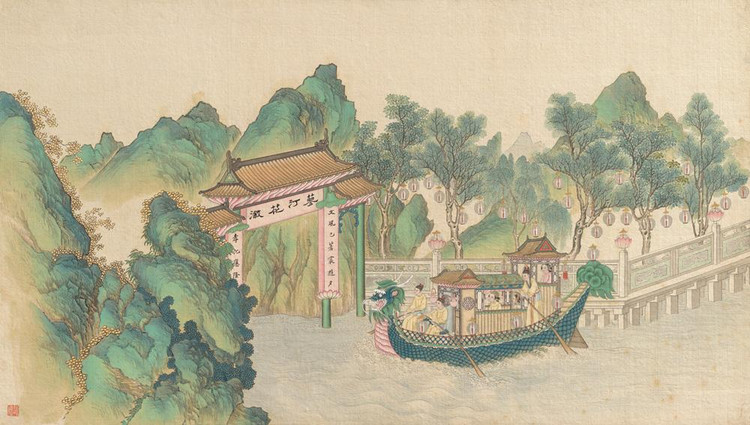

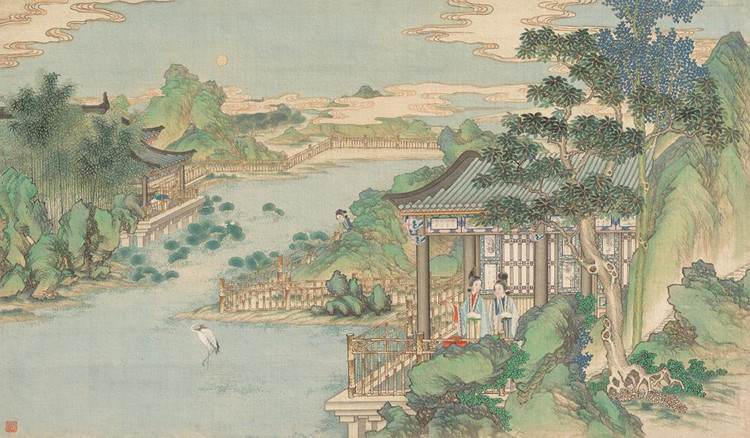

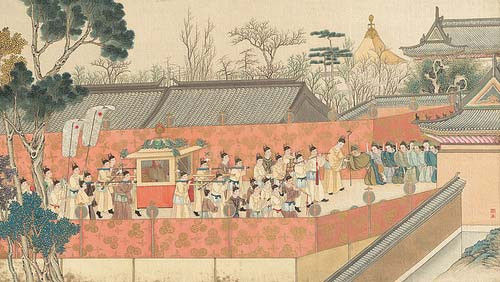

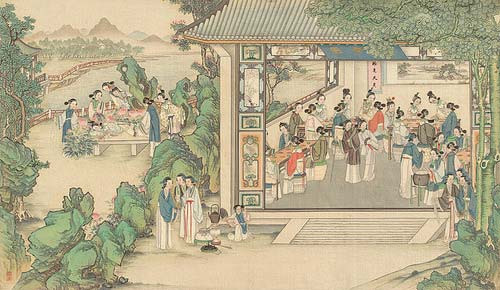

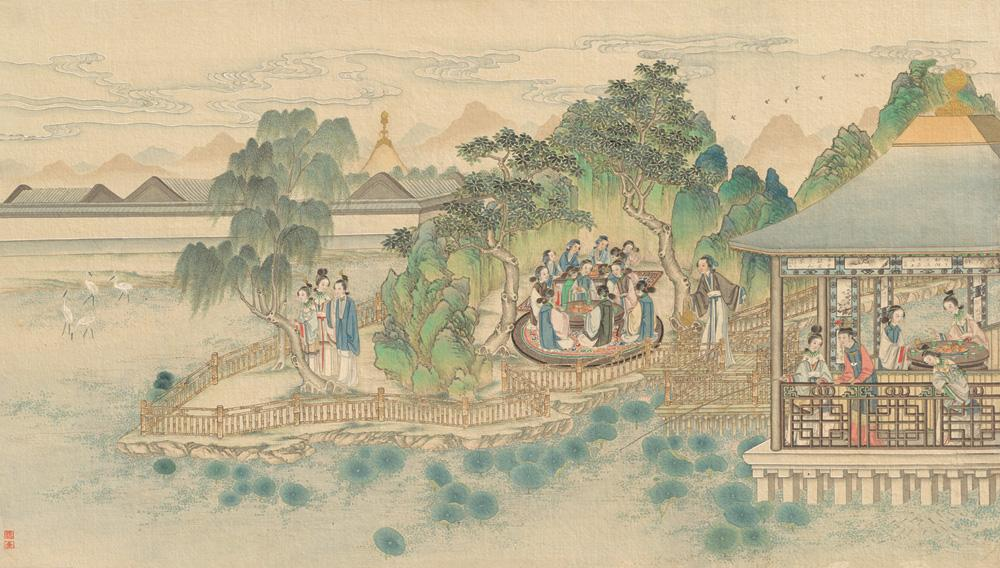

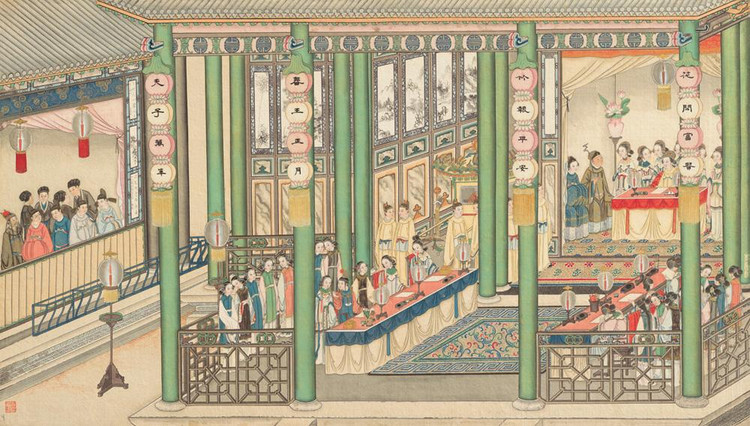

== Real-life replicas ==
A full-size replicated landscape garden based on the novel was built at Xuanwu District, in southwest Beijing in 1984, using the same name. The first major CCTV television series based on the novel was filmed in this garden. A smaller version of Prospect Garden already exists in Shanghai's Qingpu district.

Covering an area of 13 hectares (32 acres) with more than 40 scenic spots set within it, the garden comprises courtyards which replicate the residences of the main members of the Jia family. The Enjoyment Red Hall is where the principal character in the novel Jia Baoyu lived; Bamboo Lodge, a small and simple courtyard decorated in light-green, with slim bamboos grown in the courtyard, housed sickly Lin Daiyu, the heroine of the novel.

== See also ==
- Dream of the Red Chamber
