= If I Were You (2012 Chinese film) =

- Traditional Chinese: 變身男女
- Simplified Chinese: 变身男女
- Hanyu Pinyin: Biànshēn Nánnǚ
- Directed by: Li Qi
- Written by: Li Qi; Qin Wen; Chu Zheng
- Based on: Zi Yue (籽月) If I Were You
- Produced by: Zhang Qi
- Starring: Jimmy Lin; Yao Di; Wu Ma
- Cinematography: Liu Zhangmu; Li Hao
- Edited by: Sun Defu
- Music by: He Miaoshu
- Production companies: Shaoxing Xinrui Film and Television Development co., LTD
- Distributed by: Fujian Hengye Film Distribution co., LTD; Shanghai Xuanying Film and Television dissemination co., LTD
- Release date: January 26, 2012
- Running time: 92 minutes
- Country: China
- Language: Mandarin

If I Were You (Chinese: 变身男女; pinyin: Biàn shēn nánnǚ, Transfiguration of man and woman) is a 2012 Chinese romantic comedy film directed and written by Li Qi, starring Jimmy Lin, Yao Di, and Wu Ma. The film was released in China on Chinese New Year. The film is based on Biànshēn nánnǚ, a romantic novel of the same name, by the popular youth author Zi Yue.

== Cast ==
- Jimmy Lin as Shan Min, a stamen man and rich second generation who works at the Zhejiang Music Radio Station.
- Yao Di as Xiao Ai, an orphan longing for love.
- Wu Ma as the old man, who is an inventor. He invents a magic umbrella, which causes Shan Min and Xiao Ai to switch bodies.

=== Other ===
- Xu Dexin as the fat man, who is Shan Min's best friend.
- Xu Songzi as Shan Min's mother.
- Wulan Xinzi as Shan Min's former girlfriend.
- Tanya as Shan Min's lover.
- Yang Di

== Release ==
The film premiered in China on 26 January 2012.
