= Miaoyu =

Miaoyu (Chinese: 妙玉; pinyin: Miàoyù, rendered Adamantina in the David Hawkes translation) is an important character in the 18th century novel Dream of the Red Chamber, one of the classics of Chinese fiction. She is a young, beautiful but aloof Buddhist nun, compelled by circumstances to become a nun, and shelters herself under the nunnery in Prospect Garden. She likes Zhuangzi's article.

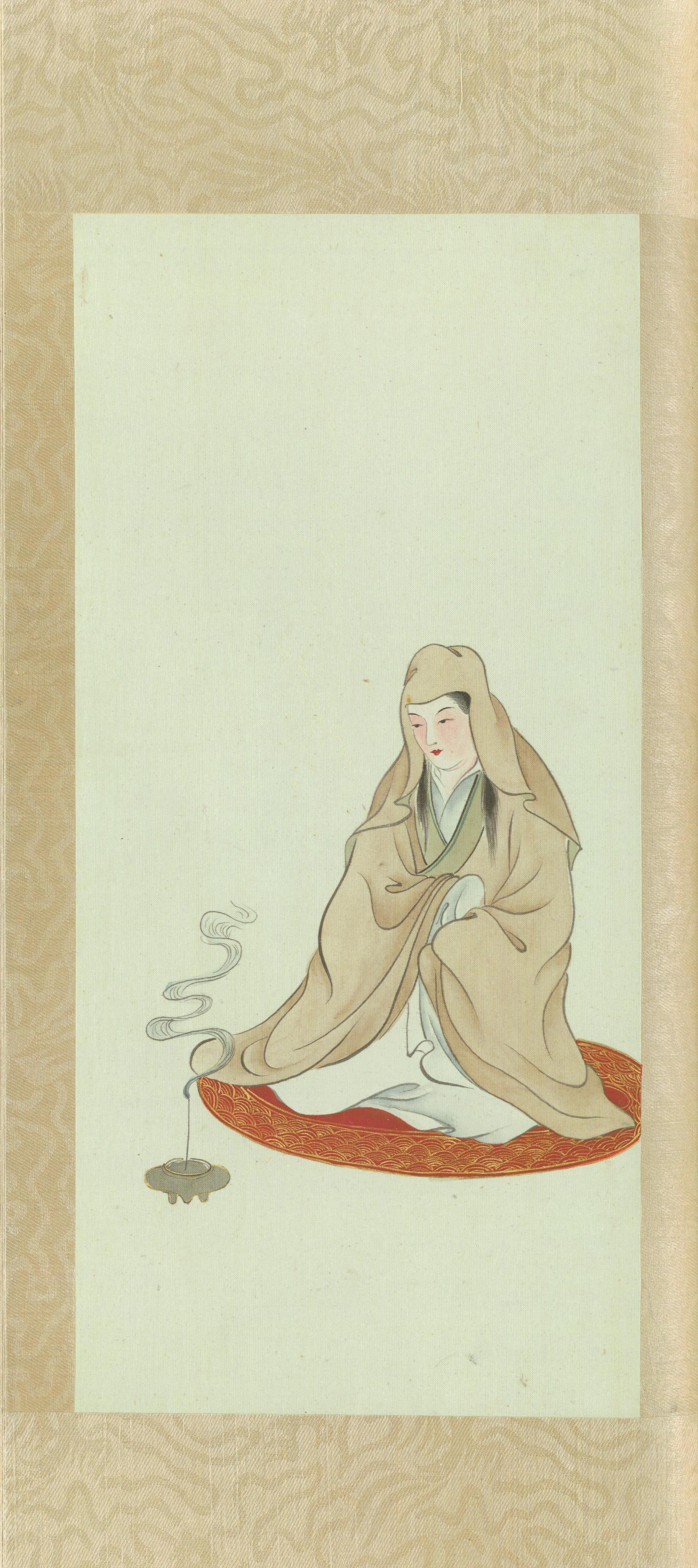
Miaoyu

Miaoyu is unusual. She esteems herself highly and, as a result, is proud and aloof but remains open to people she takes a liking to. Being extremely fastidious about cleanliness, she looks down on common people like Granny Liu and refuses to share the same tea cup the rustic granny uses. She is also a very talented poet and highly learned, maybe even more so than Shi Xiangyun and Lin Daiyu.

She has a bond with Xing Xiuyan (邢岫烟), whom she taught to read and write, and with Baoyu, once sending Baoyu a greeting during his birthday. Perhaps she appreciates Baoyu's following his own heart, such as loving Lin Daiyu openly and publicly.

Redologists think she will play a part in the original work's ending. In Gao E's ending, Miaoyu is abducted by robbers, and Jia Xichun becomes her friend. This abduction leads to Jia Xichun's decision to become a nun in her place. But many Redologists point out that this ending is in conflict with Zhiyanzhai's commentaries and with the foreshadowings in preceding chapters. It is likely Gao E's version is not in line with Cao Xueqin's original intents, although her final fate remains open to speculation.

== See also ==
- Taoism
