= Jia Qiaojie =

Jia Qiaojie (Chinese: 賈巧姐; pinyin: Jiǎ Qiǎojiě) is a character in the 18th century Chinese novel Dream of the Red Chamber. She is the only child of Jia Lian and Wang Xifeng. She remains a child throughout much of the novel. Because Qiaojie was born on the date of the Double Seventh Festival (known as Qixi 七夕 or Qiqiao 乞巧), which celebrates the annual reunion of the Weaver Girl and the Cowherd, Granny Liu names her Qiaojie 巧姐 in association, hoping the name will bestow some good luck and fortune.

At the end of the novel according to the Cheng-Gao version, Granny Liu saves her from being sold into concubinage by her maternal uncle. She and Ping'er are taken to Granny Liu's village in the country, where Qiaojie eventually marries one of Granny Liu's neighbors.

Qiaojie is the youngest of Jinling Twelve Beauties.
