= Yao Di (actress) =

Chinese actress (born 1982)

- 姚笛
- Born: March 17, 1982 (age 44); Tongxiang, Jiaxing, Zhejiang, China
- Education: Beijing Film Academy
- Occupation: Actress
- Years active: 2001–present
- Awards: 5th Huading Award for Top 10 New Spirit Artist; 2009; Golden Phoenix Award for New Performer; 2010
- Musical career
- Genre: Mandopop
- Labels: Beijing Xingbaoyuan Movie & TV lnvestment Co. Ltd.

Yao Di (Chinese: 姚笛; pinyin: Yáo Dí, born 17 March 1982) is a Chinese actress.

== Early life and education ==
Yao was born in Tongxiang, Jiaxing, Zhejiang on March 17, 1982. She graduated from Beijing Film Academy. At the age of 18, Yao entered the entertainment industry.

== Career ==
Yao rose to fame for her roles in television series The Dream of Red Mansions (2010).

In 2011, Yao starred in the romance drama Naked Marriage. The TV drama became a national sensation, and Yao was given the title of "Nation's Girlfriend" by the Chinese media.

The following year, Yao starred in the youth drama Beijing Youth, about teens in Beijing struggling against the strict and traditional culture of their parents. The drama was well received among young mainland Chinese audiences.

In 2013, Yao's fame continued to rise after she starred in two TV dramas, New Dating Era and Love Is Not Blind, which is adapted from a 2011 Chinese movie of the same name. She was named the Most Popular Actress by Youku.

However, in 2014, her affair with actor Wen Zhang was exposed. Her reputation was greatly damaged, and this temporarily halted her film career.

== Personal life ==
In 2014, Yao was found to have an affair with actor Wen Zhang while Wen's legal wife Ma Yili just gave birth to their second daughter. Some rumors suggested that their secret romance began when Ma was pregnant. Wen apologized to his family when he was caught by the media while Yao was widely blamed by the public through social media. Yao chose to keep silent after the disputed event and tried to escape from the public.

== Filmography ==
=== Film ===
Year	English title	Chinese title	Role	Notes
2004	A Zhen and Her Hostess	阿珍和她的女主人	A Zhen	
2008	June Sunlight	六月里好阳光	Gu Fei	
2008	Starting Over	从头再来	Huang Ruolan	
2009	City of Life and Death	南京！南京！	Zhou Xiaomei	
2009	Looking for Jackie	寻找成龙	Wang Xifeng	
2010	The Love of Three Smile: Scholar and the Beauty	三笑之才子佳人	Qiuxiang	
2010	Midnight Beating	午夜心跳	Wu Xinyao	
2011	Where Are You From	你是哪里人	Qianqian	
2011	Love Is Not Blind	失恋三十三天		Cameo
2012	If I Were You	变身男女	Xiao Ai	
2012	I Love You to Love Me	爱在一起		
2015	Cairo Declaration	开罗宣言	Huang Yiqing	

=== Television series ===
Year	English title	Chinese title	Role	Notes
2001		红粉须眉	Jin Ye	
2002	Music Up	歌让我狂	Cong Rong	
2003	Master Lu Ban	鲁班大师	Cong'er	
2004		天月	Jin Jin	
2004	The Last Concubine	末代皇妃	Shui Cong	
2004		律政佳人	Rebellious girl	
2004		厨子当官	Wu Yaoshi	
2005	Olive Tree in My Life	我生命中的橄榄树	Xiao Rui	
2005		青花	Bo Xiaotao	
2005	Venus of Love	维纳斯之恋	Gao Ziman	
2005		刺杀1号首长	Zhu Qiuping	
2005	Purple Jade and Gold Sand	紫玉金砂	Xu Yuelian	
2006		爱本无罪	Wu Yiren	
2006		男人有情女人有义	Qiao Man	
2006	Get Married or Not	结婚不结婚	Tingting	
2006	Double Sided Adhesive Tape	双面胶2	Yang Yang	
2007	Golden Earring	金耳环	Qiao Xiao'ou	
2007		俞净意公遇灶神记	Yu Min	
2007	Initiating Prosperity	开创盛世	Yuwen Meiniang	
2007	Ming Dynasty	天下	Xiaohong	
2010	Sinful Debt 2	孽债2	Shen Meixia	
2010	The Dream of Red Mansions	红楼梦	Wang Xifeng	
2010	Chang'e	嫦娥	Chang'e	
2011	The Hawk That Goes Away	远去的飞鹰	Ye Rongran	
2011	Naked Wedding	裸婚时代	Tong Jiaqian	
2011	Guarding Country General	护国大将军	Xiao Fengxian	
2011	Men	男人帮	Xiaoxue	
2012	Glory Land	光荣大地	Shui Yingying	
2012	Psychological Attack	攻心	Ouyang Mei	
2012	Sunflower Blooming Sound	葵花怒放的声响	Yuan Xiaomi	
2012	Chinese Sherlock Shi	施公案	Wu Wanxin	
2012	Beijing Youth	北京青年	Tang Jiao	
2013	New Age of Love	新恋爱时代	Deng Xiaoke	
2013	Warring States Little Soldier	战国小兵	Lou Fanyan	
2013	Love Is Not Blind	失恋33天	Huang Xiaoxian	
2013	Tiptoe and Kiss	踮起脚尖吻到爱	Bian Tinghua	
2014	Blooming Peace Time	和平的全盛时代	Bao Xiaodou	
2014	The Young Doctor	青年医生	Xia Kexin	Cameo
2015	My Baby	俏妈萌爸的甜蜜时光	Liu Ruonan	
2015	Mission Impossible Love	爱情碟中谍	Ding Xiaoyu	
2016	Love Che Courier	功夫之爱的速递	Yang Yiyi	
2016	Why Get Married	结婚为什么	Wang Ran	
2017	Fighter of the Destiny	择天记	Nan Ke	
2018	Born In 70s	生于70年代	Tan Yanfei	
2019	Sword Dynasty	剑王朝	Zheng Xiu	
2020	Trace	痕迹	Liang Maiqi	

== Discography ==
Year	English title	Chinese title	Album	Notes
2013	"A Love Song"	一首情歌	New Age of Love OST	
2013	"Acknowledged"	认了	New Age of Love OST	

== Awards and nominations ==
Year	Award	Category	Nominated work	Result	Ref.
2011	13th Golden Phoenix Award	Best Newcomer	—N/a	Won	
2012	26th China TV Golden Eagle Award	Best Actress	The Hawk That Goes Away	Nominated	
