= Jia Tanchun =

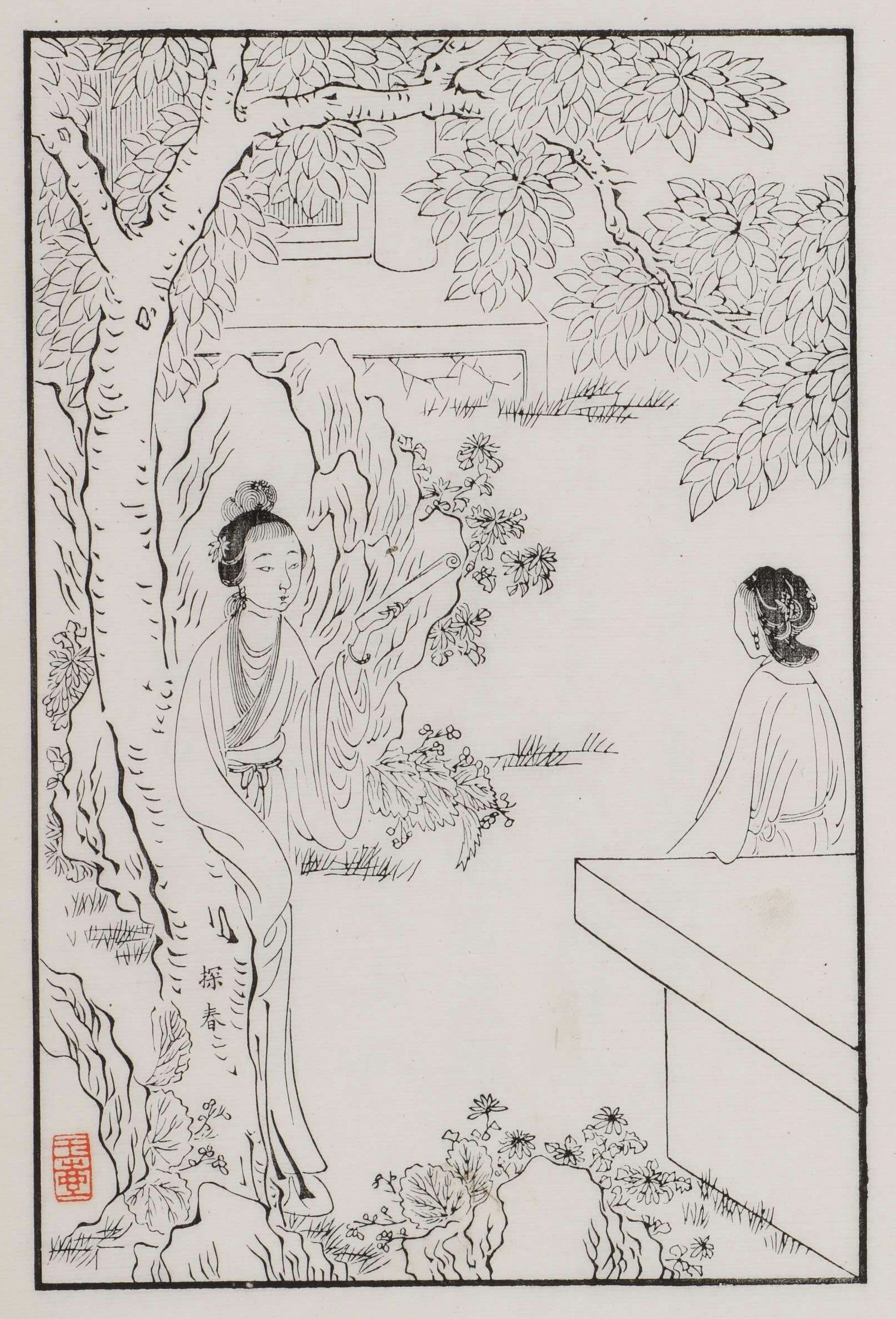
Jia Tanchun

Jia Tanchun (Chinese: 賈探春; pinyin: Jiǎ Tànchūn, rendered Quest Spring in Chi-chen Wang's translation) is the younger half-sister of Jia Baoyu and a major character in the 18th century Chinese novel Dream of the Red Chamber. She is the daughter of Jia Zheng and his concubine, Concubine Zhao. Tanchun is a very clever and capable person, once temporarily managing all household and economical affairs of the Rongguo Mansion when Wang Xifeng had a miscarriage. Despite this achievement, however, the fact she is the daughter of a concubine is still such a burden that she often claims Lady Wang, Baoyu's mother, as her own. Tanchun is also the "founder" of the White Crabapple Poetry Club, a private poetry club for the residents of Prospect Garden.

Tanchun is the third of the quartet of "Springs". Her name translates roughly as "In quest for spring". As she is beautiful and has a "prickly" personality because of her forthright and outspoken nature, she earned the nickname of "Rose". Tanchun provides a sharp contrast to her elder cousin Jia Yingchun. While Tanchun is outspoken and capable, Yingchun is weak-willed and comparatively untalented.

In the Cheng-Gao version, she eventually marries the son of a frontier official and lives her married life in a foreign country. Although her husband's family loves her, she still misses her family in the capital and therefore is a now tragic figure. While this may not accord to Cao's original intents completely, Redologists agree she will eventually marry to a far-off place and cease to have any link with the Jia Clan.
