= Hua Xiren =

Dream of the Red Chamber character

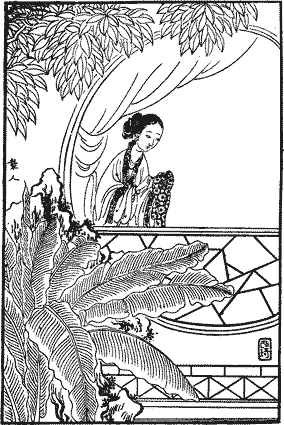
A Qing Dynasty woodcut print depicts Xiren. By Gai Qi (born 1773)

Hua Xiren (simplified Chinese: 花袭人; traditional Chinese: 花襲人; pinyin: Huā Xírén, rendered Aroma in David Hawkes' translation and Pervading Fragrance in Chi-chen Wang's translation), originally called Zhenzhu, is a major fictional character from the classic 18th century Chinese novel Dream of the Red Chamber. She is the chief maid of Jia Baoyu, the novel's protagonist. Her surname Hua means "Flower" and her given name literally means "assail people". Her given name is chosen by Baoyu and is borrowed from a line of poetry.

Sold by her poor parents to the Jia family, Xiren is portrayed as highly intelligent, diligent, and thoughtful, and all of her masters — Grandmother Jia, Shi Xiangyun, and Baoyu — are fond of her, as are most of her colleagues. In contrast to her partner Qingwen, Xiren is often seen as an upholder of repressive feudal values (especially by Marxist critics), and as such, whether she usually acts out of genuine kindness or self-interest has been a matter of intense academic debate.

== Description ==
Baoyu's principal maid, Xiren is a few years older than her master. She was formerly Grandmother Jia's maid: the Dowager ceded her to Baoyu owing to her extreme loyalty and diligence. In practice, as Xiren serves as Baoyu's primary caretaker, she is given higher allowances than the Dowager's own maids.

Xiren is the partner of Baoyu's first adolescent sexual encounter in Chapter 5, though there is little evidence of an ongoing sexual relationship as the novel progresses. Xiren is valued for her conscientiousness by Lady Wang, Grandmother Jia, and other members of the Jia Clan. She urges Baoyu to study diligently and live up to his father's expectations, but Baoyu does not take her advice to heart and instead prefers not to enter the bureaucracy.
