= Shi Xiangyun =

Shi Xiangyun (traditional Chinese: 史湘雲; simplified Chinese: 史湘云; pinyin: Shǐ Xiāngyún) is a major fictional character in the classic 18th century Chinese novel Dream of the Red Chamber, one of the characters known as the Twelve Beauties. She is Jia Baoyu's younger second cousin by the Dowager, Grandmother Jia. Xiangyun is the favorite grandniece of the Dowager, Baoyu's grandmother.

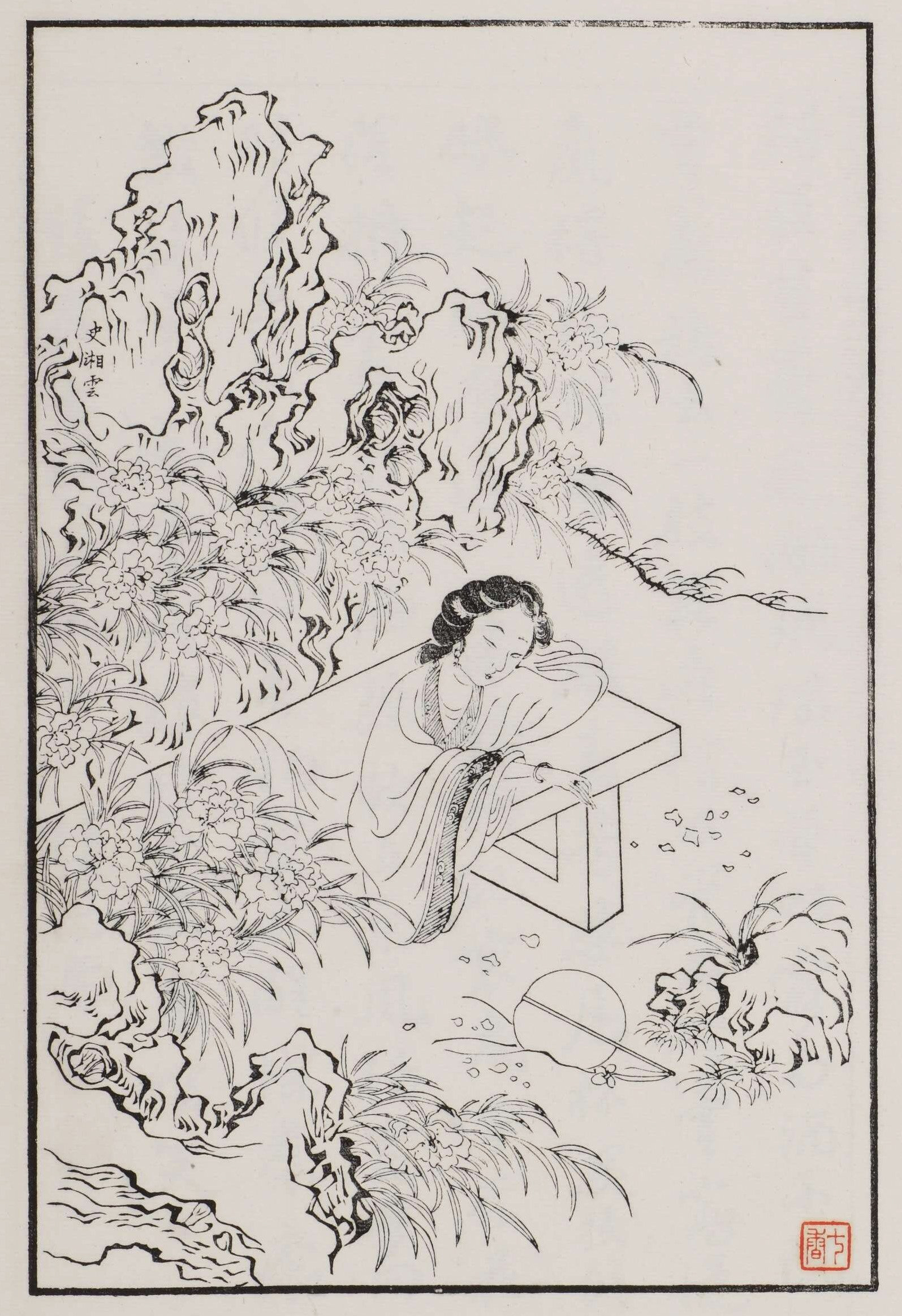
Shi Xiangyun

Orphaned since infancy, she grew up under the watchful eyes of her wealthy maternal aunt and uncle who lives in Jinling. They use her unkindly to do embroidery and needlework for the family late into the night. Despite her misfortune, she is always cheerful and ready to play a small joke. Her open-heartedness make her pranks forgiven by most. She is also excellent in embroidery and is forthright without tact. She wears a golden qilin by her neck.

Xiangyun is portrayed as a tomboy-ish girl who does not cultivate the over-refined nature of most feudal ladies. She looks fine in men's clothes and loves to drink and eat meat. Apparently an androgynous beauty, her cousins always beg the Dowager to send for her so she can visit them, for Xiangyun is a big-hearted girl, and a wonderful visitor and company.

Like almost every lady from the Jia Clan, Xiangyun is learned. She is almost as good a poet as Daiyu or Baochai, and she is a mainstay of the Crab Flower Club, which is set up by Tanchun and Daiyu.

Daiyu initially feels a little jealousy owing to Xiangyun's and Baoyu's good relationship but eventually warms to the cheerful girl. Xiangyun becomes one of Daiyu's closest companions.

One of the more memorable scenes in the book (in Chapter 62) has Shi Xiangyun going tipsy and falling asleep amongst the flowers on a stone bench in the Prospect Garden, surrounded by butterflies, with her fan half-buried in scattered petals. This scene is depicted in many artworks featuring the novel's characters.

In Gao E and Cheng Weiyuan's edition of the novel, Xiangyun marries but is soon widowed.

== See also ==
- Jia Baoyu
- Lin Daiyu
- Jia Tanchun
