= Xue Baochai =

Chinese literary character

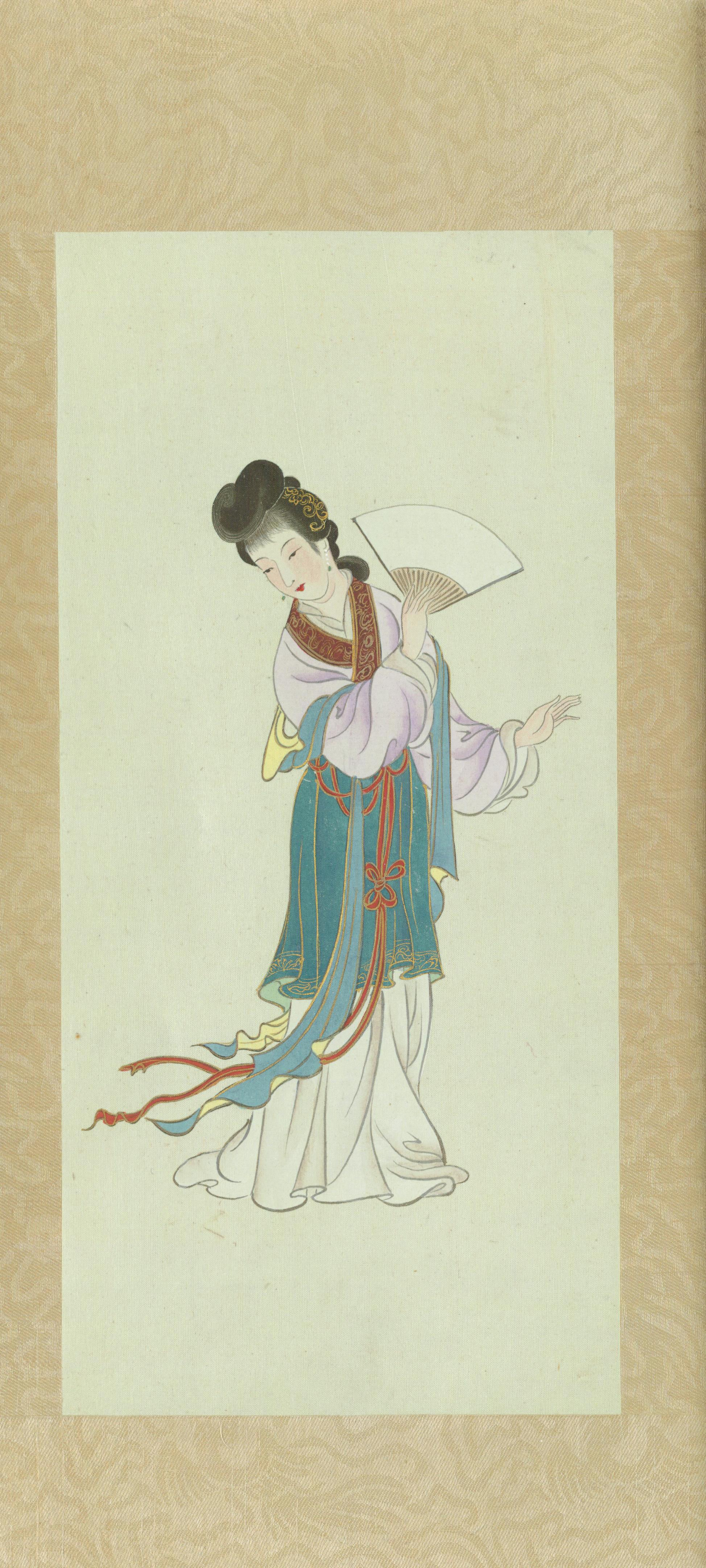
Xue Baochai

Xue Baochai (traditional Chinese: 薛寶釵; simplified Chinese: 薛宝钗; pinyin: Xuē Bǎochāi; lit. 'Precious Chai', and her surname is a homophone with "Snow", rendered Precious Virtue in Chi-chen Wang's translation) is one of the principal characters in the classic 18th century Chinese novel Dream of the Red Chamber. Described as extremely beautiful and socially graceful, her attributes complement those of her cousin Lin Daiyu. Indeed, it has been suggested that the two women are complements of one another – each has exactly the attributes of Cao Xueqin's ideal woman which the other lacks.

She is the only daughter of Aunt Xue and the younger sister of Xue Pan, a local Jinling bully. Unlike her brother, she is an excellent poet and a good elder cousin to Baoyu and Daiyu, and a good mistress to her maids. Well liked by all the servants and the mistresses of the Jia household, she also is a capable person, once helping Lady Wang manage the Rong Guo Mansion. Baochai is also extremely tactful, always careful never to offend anyone of importance in the house. Eventually, she marries Jia Baoyu.

The novel portrays Xue Baochai as a perspicacious and talented woman whose marriage became a tragedy because Jia Baoyu, her husband, is never able to truly forget Lin Daiyu, his true love, after the latter died before they could get married. There is a tragic song in chapter five which foreshadows her fate.

In the Cheng-Gao version of the novel, Xue Baochai marries Jia Baoyu under the machinations of Wang Xifeng and Grandmother Jia, causing Lin Daiyu's death through grief. However, many Redology scholars have commented that this is unlikely since, according to Zhiyanzhai and the clues of foreshadowing, Lin Daiyu dies well before their eventual wedding.

While later scholars have a mostly favorable view of her (or her characterization in the novel), there are some that view her as an "antagonistic" character within the novel. Some have described Xue as "diplomatic and manipulative" and the embodiment of "conformity".

Various illustrations of Xue Baochai
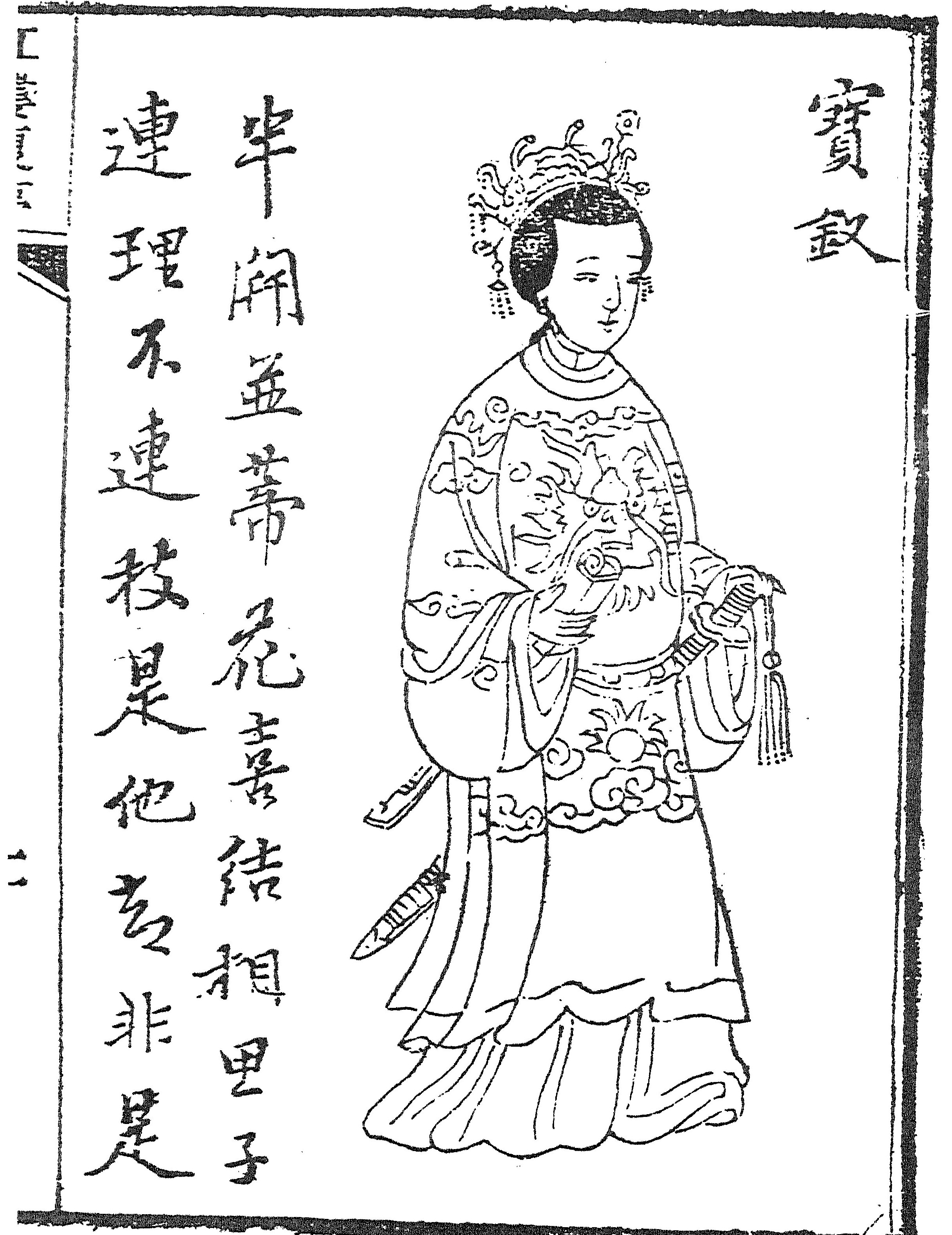
An 1805 print illustration

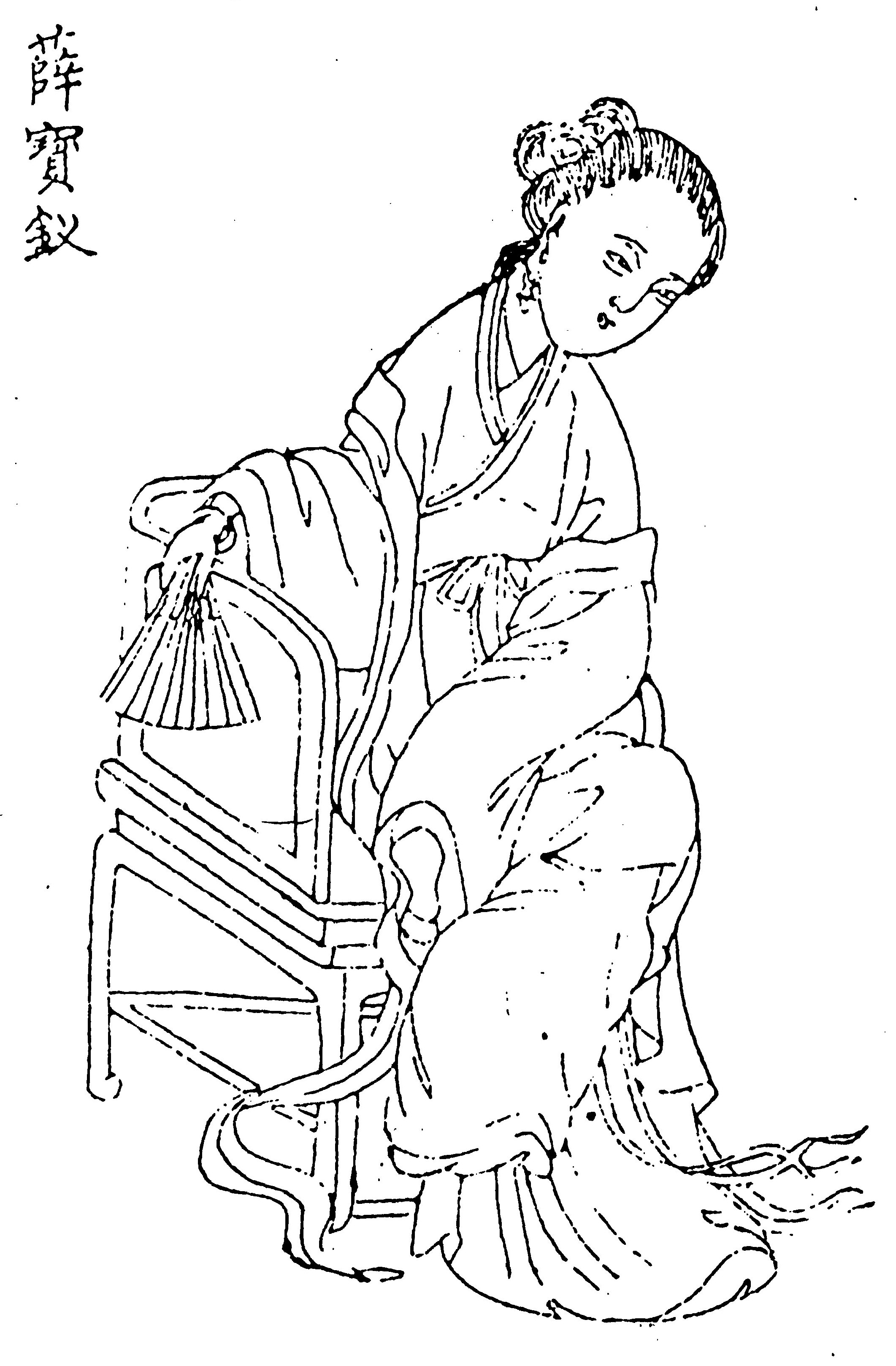
An 1820 print illustration

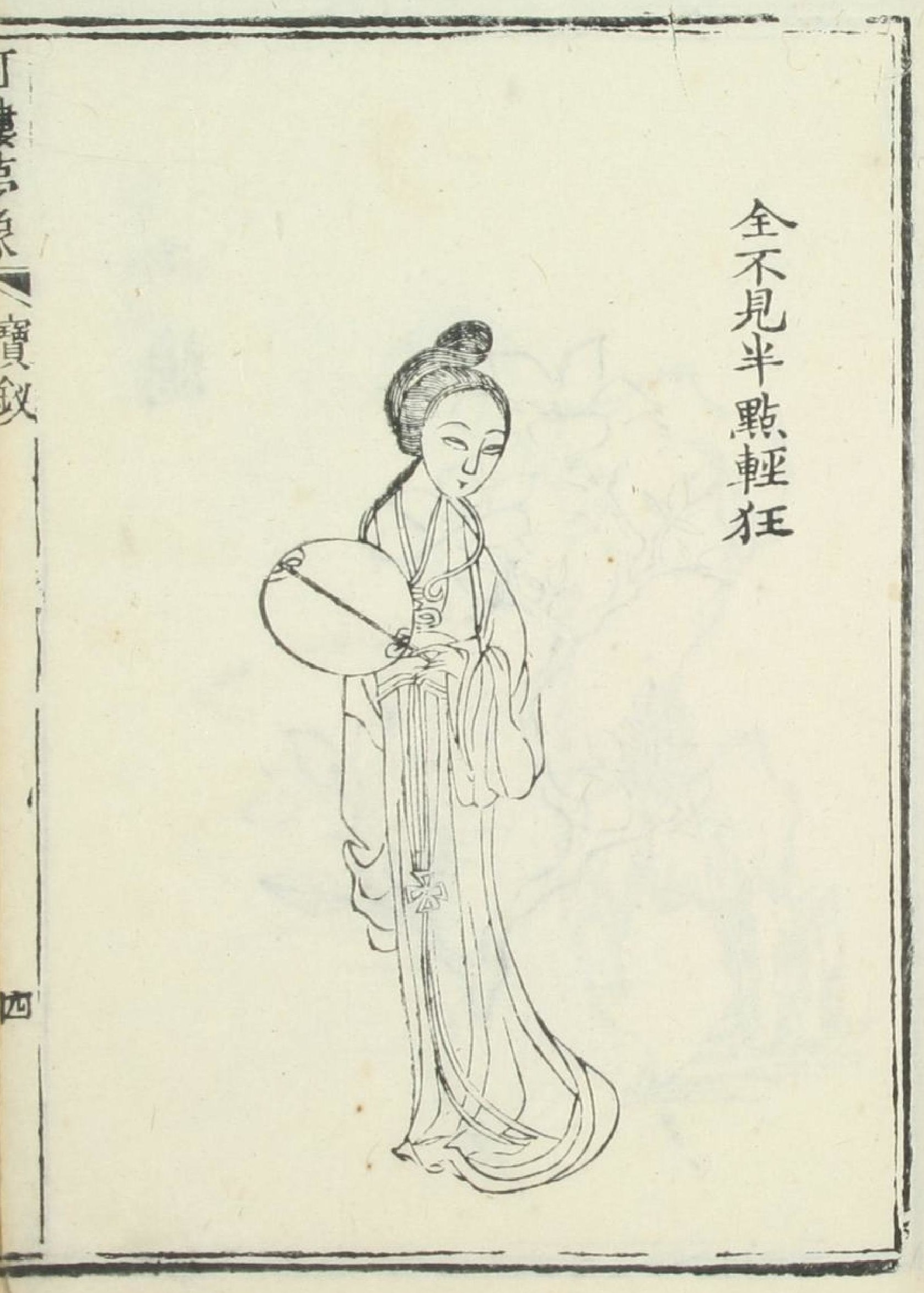
An 1832 print illustration

== See also ==
- Jia Baoyu
- Lin Daiyu
