= Grandmother Jia =

Character from the Dream of the Red Chamber

Grandmother Jia (Chinese: 賈母; pinyin: Jiǎ Mǔ), née Shi, so often also called Dowager Shi (Chinese: 史太君; pinyin: Shǐ Tàijūn) or simply the Dowager, is a major character in the 18th century Chinese novel Dream of the Red Chamber. She is the daughter of Marquis Shi of Jinling. She is also Baoyu and Daiyu's grandmother and the oldest and most respected authority of the Jia Clan. A doting figure, it was she who arranged for Daiyu, her only "outside" (i.e., maternal) grandchild, to come to the Rongguo Mansion. It was with her help that Baoyu and Daiyu became extremely close as childhood playmates, and eventually, kindred spirits and lovers.

Grandmother Jia is at heart a fun-loving elder who greatly enjoys conversation and the company of her many grandchildren. A Chinese opera fan, despite her great wealth and prestige she is mindful of the rustic poor like Granny Liu, and is pious and generous in almsgiving.

The Dowager's descendants and close relatives include:

- two sons, Jia She and Jia Zheng
- a daughter, Jia Min
- two daughters-in-law, Lady Xing (wife of Jia She) and Lady Wang (wife of Jia Zheng)
- many paternal grandchildren, such as Jia Baoyu, Jia Lian, 3 of the 4 "Springs" (Jia Yuanchun, Jia Yingchun, Jia Tanchun)
- a maternal grandchild, Lin Daiyu (daughter of Lin Ruhai and Jia Min)
- a granddaughter-in-law, Wang Xifeng (wife of Jia Lian)
- a son-in-law, Lin Ruhai (husband of Jia Min)
- a grandniece, Shi Xiangyun
- several great-grandchildren, such as Jia Qiaojie and Jia Lan.
