= Xue Pan =

Dream of the Red Chamber character

Xue Pan (Chinese: 薛蟠; pinyin: Xūe Pán) is a secondary character in the classic 18th-century Chinese novel Dream of the Red Chamber. He is an idle troublemaker who is guilty of murdering a man over a beautiful slave girl, Zhen Yinglian, who is renamed as Xiangling (Lotus). He has the manslaughter case done over with money, then escapes to the capital from Jinling.

He is the elder brother of Xue Baochai and the son of Aunt Xue. Pan was also a local bully in Jinling City, where the Xues came from. He is a total opposite of Baochai, who is tactful and cultivated, although he has genuine respect for his sister. He is on the other hand tactless and uncouth, and mixes around with bad company. He eventually marries a shrew, Xia Jingui, who causes much misery to Aunt Xue, Baochai, Xiangling and himself.

Xia Jingui tries to seduce Xue Pan's cousin named Xue Ke, but Xue Ke rejects her. This is seen by Xiangling which causes Xia Jingui to hate Xiangling. Xia Jingui tries to poison Xiangling, but drinks the wrong cup and is poisoned herself. The Xia family comes to the Xue household to exact revenge on Xiangling, but Xia Jingui's servant tells the truth and the Xia family are forced to leave. After Xia Jingui's death, Xiangling becomes the wife of Xue Pan.
