= Gao E =

Qing Chinese scholar, writer and editor

- Traditional Chinese: 高鶚
- Simplified Chinese: 高鹗
Transcriptions
Standard Mandarin
- Hanyu Pinyin: Gāo È
- Wade–Giles: Kao^{1} E^{4}
- IPA: [káʊ ɤ̂]
Yue: Cantonese
- Yale Romanization: Gōu Ngohk
Southern Min
- Tâi-lô: Ko Go̍k

Gao E (Chinese: 高鶚, c. 1738 – c. 1815) was a Qing dynasty Chinese scholar, writer, and editor. He attained the degree of juren in 1788 and jinshi in 1795. A Han Chinese who belonged to the Bordered Yellow Banner, he became a Fellow of the Hanlin Academy in 1801. His courtesy name was Yunfu (雲甫) and art name Lanshu (蘭塾,"Orchid Study-Place").

In 1791, together with his partner Cheng Weiyuan (程偉元), he "recovered" the last forty chapters of Cao Xueqin's monumental novel Dream of the Red Chamber (sometimes called The Story of the Stone). The nature and extent of his contributions to the work and the sources of his material are a matter of controversy, but it is believed by a large number of modern orthodox Redologists that the last forty chapters were not written by Cao Xueqin. He also edited the first eighty chapters together with Cheng.

In 1921, Hu Shih proposed that the last forty chapters of Dream of the Red Chamber were written by Gao E himself. His proposition was accepted by many orthodox Redologist scholars such as Zhou Ruchang. Gao and Cheng's continuation is believed by some as a conspiracy by the Qing dynasty imperial court to hide the semi-autobiographical nature of the novel, which involves the politics of the Yongzheng era. During the mid-20th century, the discovery of a pre-1791 "120 chapter manuscript" complicated the questions regarding Gao's involvement. Irene Eber found the discovered manuscript "seems to confirm Cheng and Gao's claim that they merely edited a complete manuscript, consisting of 120 chapters, rather than actually writing a portion of the novel."

== Sources ==
- Zhou Ruchang, 周汝昌：《流行本《红楼梦》后四十回叙书》，北京出版社， pp. 307–8.
