= Wang Chi-chen =

Chinese-American scholar and translator

- Born: 1899; Huantai County, Qing Empire
- Died: 2001 (aged 101–102)
- Occupations: Literary scholar; translator; professor

Academic background
- Education: University of Wisconsin; Columbia University

Academic work
- Institutions: University of Wisconsin—Madison; Columbia University; Metropolitan Museum of Art
- Notable students: Burton Watson

Chi-chen Wang (Chinese: 王際真; pinyin: Wáng Jìzhēn; 1899–2001) was a Chinese-born American literary scholar and translator. He taught as a professor at Columbia University from 1929 until his retirement in 1965.

== Life and career ==
Wang was born in Huantai County, Shandong province. His father Wang Caiting (Chinese: 王寀廷; 1877–1952) achieved the Jinshi degree, the highest level of the civil service examinations and was a county magistrate in Guangdong, where Chi-chen lived for several years.

Chi-chen studied the Confucian classics at home, then entered the middle school affiliated with Tsinghua University in Beijing in 1913. Upon graduation he proceeded to the United States on a Boxer Indemnity Scholarship Program scholarship. In 1922–1924 he studied at the University of Wisconsin and earned an A.B. in Economics. In 1924–1927 he attended Columbia University's business and journalism schools and the Graduate Faculties of Political Science, Philosophy and Pure Science. Wang did not study for a higher degree perhaps because, as he later wrote, he was not a "good student". He confessed he was more interested in pursuing girls (although back in Shandong he had a wife by arranged marriage who later bore him a son).

While in the United States, he came in conflict with American missionaries and the values of what he called western "enterprise, pugnacity, and dead-in-earnestness". He argued that Chinese religion was non-sectarian and pragmatic, and that the "practical common sense of the Chinese" makes the task of saving "the Heathen Chinee [sic]" difficult, even more so by the "growing sense of nationalism" after the "farcical Treaty of Versailles".

Wang joined the Columbia faculty in 1929 was also a research assistant at New York's Metropolitan Museum of Art, 1928–1936. and was among the few Chinese scholars employed at American universities in 1928. He returned to China in 1929 and 1935 to visit his family, which then lived in Shandong. On his 1929 visit, the poet Xu Zhimo introduced him to Shen Congwen, a highly regarded novelist and short-story writer. Wang and Shen corresponded regularly in the following years.

Wang was in the group that expanded the Columbia Asian studies faculty in the 1930s, in which Wang taught classical language and literature. Wm Theodore de Bary's history of the program notes that

As a liberated child of the Revolution and alienated from much of traditional culture, he tended to be somewhat cynical and less than inspiring as a lecturer. His forte was as a translator of modern literature, and though allergic to all talk of grammar, he would spend long hours in virtually tutorial sessions with those determined enough to benefit from his fine command of both Chinese and English.

Wang expected his students to not only be competent in reading Chinese but fluent and idiomatic English, particularly if they were native speakers. One of his students, Burton Watson, who would become an eminent translator, recalled taking an advanced course with Wang in 1950 reading two essays from the Shiji in classical Chinese. He later wrote that he remembered Professor Wang's "frequent exasperated outbursts,'You mean you don't even know that character?" or 'What kind of English is that!'" Watson continued that the hours spent with him that year "left me with the conviction that in translating such texts, it is not enough merely to bring across the meaning of the Chinese; one must do so in a manner that reads like natural idiomatic English. This conviction has remained with me through the years and informed all my work as a translator of Chinese and Japanese."

Another Columbia student who went on to a successful academic career, Harriet Mills, remarked that Wang Chi-chen's translations were what first interested her in Lu Xun. Wang resigned from her dissertation committee, however, leaving Mills with the impression that he feared he would be in danger of McCarthyite reprisals (Mills argued that Lu Xun sincerely supported the Communists, a controversial position during the Cold War).

Through his friend, C.T. Hsia, Wang began a correspondence with Chen Jo-hsi, a Taiwan author who was living in Vancouver. She had gone from Taiwan to live in mainland China during the Cultural Revolution and wrote stories frankly describing life there. After they met, Chen said they became "friends across the generation gap". Wang translated several of her stories and gave her advice that she used in revising her book, Execution of Mayor Yin (1978)

When he retired, Wang recommended that C.T. Hsia succeed him.

Wang was married twice, first to Bliss Kao, and then to Yang Dalai, until his death in 2001.

== Translations and influence ==
The Hong Kong scholar Wang Baorong called Wang "the most successful Lu Xun translator in the early years" and writes that Wang made "American-English versions of sixteen pieces which are accurate and refined."

== Selected publications ==
- Wang, Chichen (1926), "Fate of the Heathen Chinee", The Chinese Students' Monthly, 21 (6): 31–40
- —— (1930), "Notes on Chinese Ink", Metropolitan Museum Studies, 3 (1): 114–133, doi:10.2307/1522772, JSTOR 1522772
- —— (1934), "Western Tides in Chinese Literature", Pacific Affairs, 7 (2): 127–138, doi:10.2307/2751112, JSTOR 2751112
- —— (14 June 1989), "Chinese Hardliners Did the Right Thing", The New York Times.

=== Translations ===
- The Dream of the Red Chamber. by Tsao Hsueh-Chin and Kao Ngoh. Translated and Adapted by Chi-Chen Wang, with a Preface by Arthur Waley. (Garden City, NY: Doubleday, Doran,1929). Pp. xxvii. 371.
- Ah Q and Others: Selected Stories of Lusin (Lu Xun) (New York: Columbia University Press, 1941):
  - My native heath.
  - The cake of soap.
  - The divorce.
  - Reunion in a restaurant.
  - The story of hair.
  - Cloud over Luchen.
  - Our story of Ah Q.
  - A hermit at large.
  - Remorse.
  - The widow.
  - The diary of a madman.
- Contemporary Chinese Stories (New York: Columbia University Press, 1944):
  - The road, by Chang T'ien-yi.
  - The inside story, by Chang T'ien-yi.
  - A country boy withdraws from school, by Lao Hsiang.
  - Black Li and White Li, by Lao She.
  - The glasses, by Lao She.
  - Grandma takes charge, by Lao She.
  - The philanthropist, by Lao She.
  - Liu's court, by Lao She.
  - The puppet dead, by Pa Chin.
  - Night march, by Shen Ts'ung-wen.
  - Smile! By Chang T'ien-yi.
  - Reunion, by Chang T'ien-yi.
  - Little sister, by Feng Wen-ping.
  - The helpmate, by Ling Shu-hua (Mrs. Ch'en T'ung-po)
  - Spring silkworms, by Mao Dun.
  - "A true Chinese," by Mao Dun.
  - Mrs. Li's hair, by Yeh Shao-chun.
  - Neighbors, by Yeh Shao-chn.
  - What's the difference? By Lusin.
  - Peking street scene, by Lusin.
  - Yuchun, by Yang Chen-sheng.
- Traditional Chinese Tales (New York: Columbia University Press, 1944):
  - Hsu¨ Yen's strange encounter, or, Lovers within a lover
  - Wu Chun—The ancient mirror
  - Wang Tu—The white monkey—The disembodied soul
  - Ch'en Hsuan-yu—The magic pillow
  - Shen Jiji—Jenshih, or, The fox lady
  - Shen Jiji – The dragon's daughter
  - Li Ch'ao-wei—Huo Hsiaoyu¨ by Jiang Fang—Li Yahsien, a loyal courtesan
  - Po Hsing-chien – The Story of YingYing
  - Yuan Chen—Hsieh Hsiaowo, or, A monkey in the carriage
  - Li Kung-tso—The Kunlun slave
  - P'ei Hsing—Yinniang the swordswoman
  - P'ei Hsing—Predestined marriage
  - Li Fu-yen—Du Zizhun
  - Li Fuyen—The jade kuanyin—The judicial murder of Tsui Ning—The flower lover and the fairies—The oil peddler and the queen of flowers—The three brothers.
- Stories of China at War (New York: Columbia University Press, 1947): (HathiTrust Free Online)
  - Beyond the Willow wall, by Tuan-mu Kung-liang.
  - Three men, by Chen Shou-chu.
  - Heaven has eyes, by Mao Dun.
  - The red trousers, by Pien Chih-lin.
  - An unsuccessful fight, by Ping Po.
  - Chabancheh Makay, by Yao Hsu¨eh-yin.
  - Purge by fire, by Yang Shuo.
  - Builders of the Burma Road, by Pai P'ing-chieh.
  - In the steel mill, by King Yu-ling.
  - Test of good citizenship, by Li Wei-t'ao.
  - They take heart again, by Lao She (Lau Shaw)
  - Portrait of a traitor, by Lao She (Lau Shaw)
  - The letter from home, by Lao She (Lau Shaw)
  - A new life, by Chang T'ien-yi.
  - House hunting, by Tuan-mu Kung-liang.
  - Under the moonlight, by Kuo Mo-jo.
- Dream of the Red Chamber. [by] Tsao Hsueh-Chin. Translated and Adapted by Chi-Chen Wang (Garden City, NY: Doubleday & Co: Garden City, N.Y, 1958). Pp. xx. 329.

== References and further reading ==
- Kao, George, "Chi-chen Wang: An Appreciation", in George Kao, ed., Two Writers and the Cultural Revolution: Lao She and Chen Jo-hsi (Hong Kong:The Chinese University Press, 1980), pp. 131–132.
- Ferguson, John C. (1930). "Promotion of Chinese Studies". Parnassus. 2 (3): 27–43. doi:10.2307/797923. hdl:2027/heb.33104. JSTOR 797923. S2CID 79770622.
- Wang, Baorong (2011). Lu Xun's fiction in English translation: the early years_2011 (Thesis). University of Hong Kong. hdl:10722/173974.
