= Granny Liu =

Granny Liu (Chinese: 劉姥姥; pinyin: Liú Lǎolāo) is a character in the 18th century Chinese novel Dream of the Red Chamber. She is an elderly country rustic and a distant relative of Lady Wang through "joining families" and marriage (i.e. they are not related by blood).

Granny Liu's son-in-law's grandfather was adopted by Lady Wang's father, hence the Jia clan became related to her son-in-law's family. Granny Liu was entrusted with the task of calling on Lady Wang by her son-in-law Gou'er.

Granny Liu visits the Rongguo Mansion on two occasions during the novel with her young grandson Ban'er. Each time, they provide a sharp contrast to the Jia family members. Nevertheless, she is respected by everyone for her age, hale physique and forthright nature, providing much comic relief, even for the Dowager. Each time, she also takes home many valuable gifts of clothing, money, food, family remedies, and livestock. In Cheng-Gao ending of the novel, Granny Liu visits Wang Xifeng before she dies and saves Qiaojie from concubinage.

The expression roughly translating to "Granny Liu visits the Grand View Gardens" (simplified Chinese: 刘姥姥进大观园; traditional Chinese: 劉姥姥進大觀園; pinyin: Liú lǎolao jìn Dàguānyuán) refers to this character, who visits the noble family who plays host to her, but which also makes fun of her openly for her simplicity (Granny Liu is, however, grateful for their generosity.) The expression is used in modern Chinese to describe someone, usually simple and unsophisticated, who is overwhelmed by new experiences and luxurious surroundings.
