= Wang Xifeng =

Character in Dream of the Red Chamber

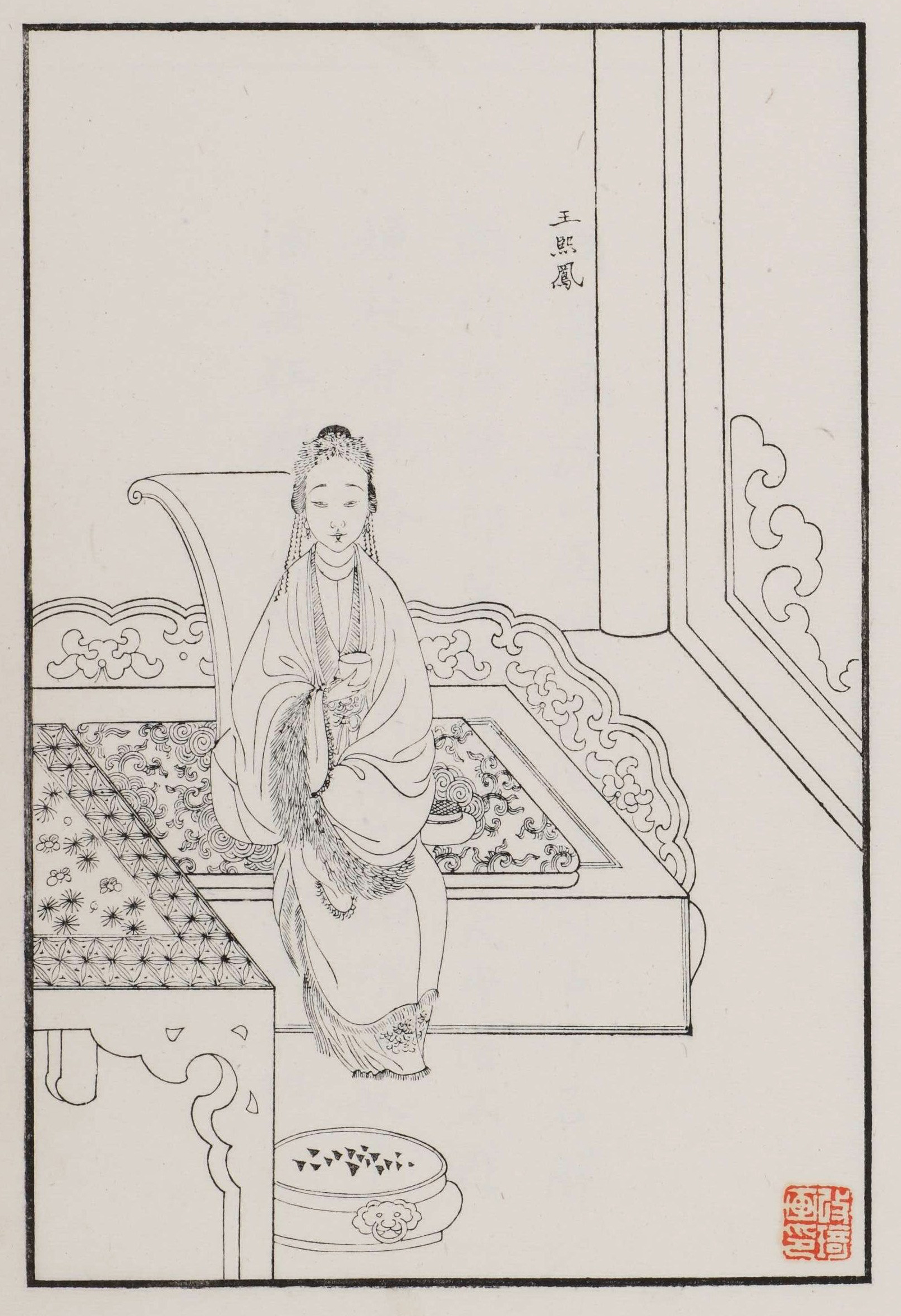
Wang Xifeng as depicted in an 1879 illustration

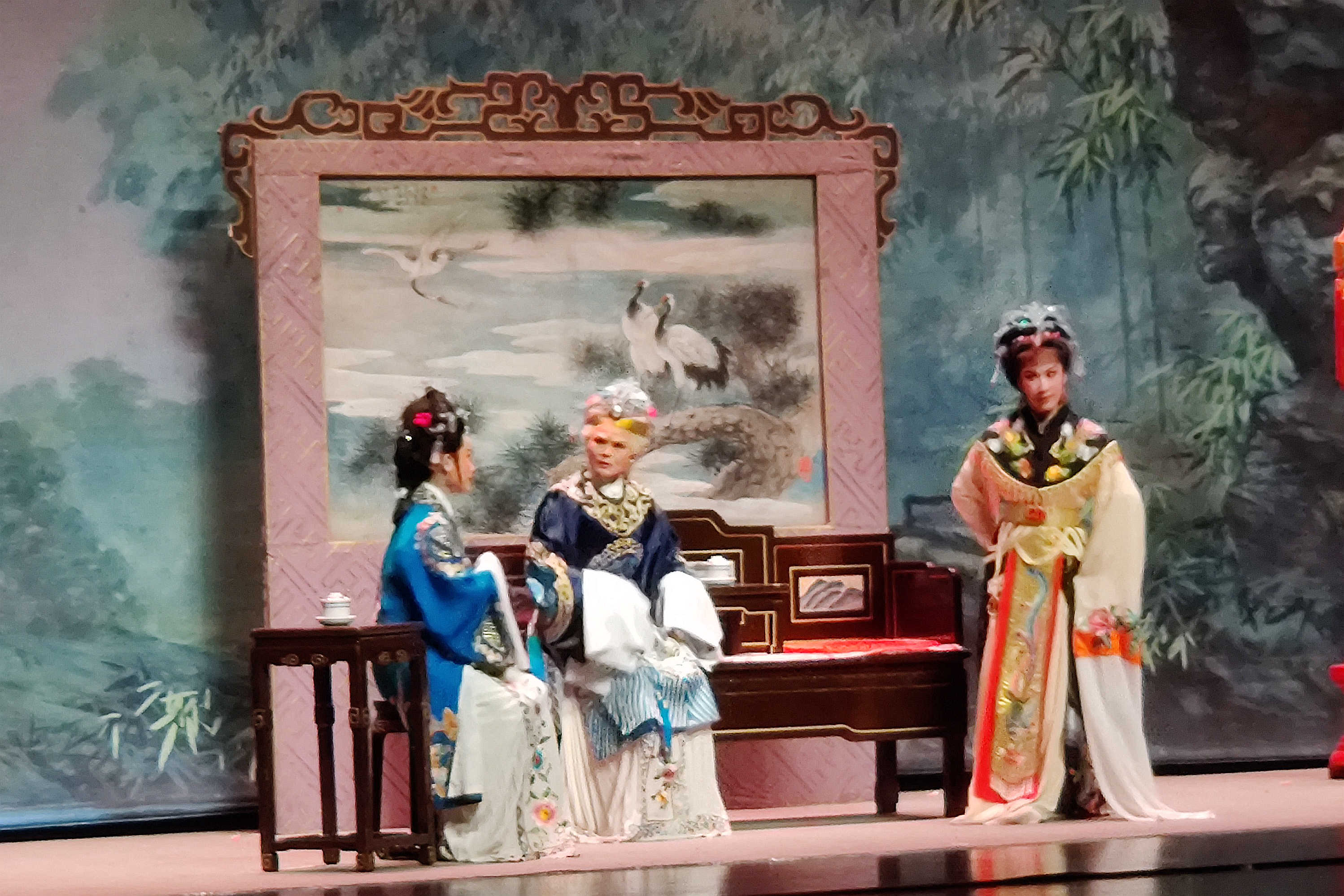
Wang Xifeng (on the right) as depicted in Chinese opera

Wang Xifeng (traditional Chinese: 王熙鳳; simplified Chinese: 王熙凤; pinyin: Wáng Xīfèng, rendered Phoenix in Chi-chen Wang's translation) is one of the principal characters in the classic 18th-century Chinese novel Dream of the Red Chamber. She came from one of the Four Great Families, the Wangs (the other three are Jia, Shi, and Xue), and is known for her wit and intelligence, her vivacious manner, her great beauty, her multiple-faced personality, and her fierce sense of fidelity. The name “Xifeng” was considered masculine in her era. This accounts for her self-assuredness and straightforward ways, characteristics that do not quite fit with the traditional female role at the time.

== Relations ==
Xifeng is a niece of Lady Wang and is married to Jia Lian, the eldest grandchild of Grandmother Jia (hence, she is related to Baoyu by blood and by marriage). As such she plays a significant role in the day-to-day running of the Rongguo household; in fact, she is the de facto holder of the household's purse. She is the most powerful woman in the Jia Clan, after Grandmother Jia and Lady Wang. She is also worldly, tactful, and able to sweet-talk Grandmother Jia and the other powerful ladies within the family while controlling the servants with an iron fist. However, she is disliked by the jealous Lady Xing, her husband's stepmother, who came from a family of lower social status and who resented Xifeng for her talent and power.

== Relationship With Jia Lian ==
Xifeng's relationship with her sybaritic husband changed greatly as the story progressed. At first, Jia Lian was infatuated with his new bride, weeping hysterically when she got ill with a voodoo curse. But he is a womanizer by nature and grew tired of Xifeng's stringent control. In one chapter, he slept with a servant woman during his daughter's illness; in another, he was caught in bed with the wife of his servant on Xifeng's birthday. The fatal turn in their relationship came when Jia Lian met You Erjie at a funeral, and married her in secret (right after Xifeng's abortion). Xifeng was kept in the dark for months. When she found out, the outraged mistress came up with a cunning plan. She put on a pretty smile and invited You Erjie to live with the Jia family, putting the unfortunate concubine completely under her control. In the end, You Erjie lost her child to a charlatan and committed suicide. Xifeng and Jia Lian's relationship deteriorated quickly after this.

== Personality ==
Sister Feng (凤姐, Fèng Jiě) as Xifeng is also known, is well known in the novel both for her great capability as well as her almost-venomous character; when a poorer member of the Jia family once tried to seduce her into having an affair with him, she tricked him repeatedly into "rendezvous" which turned out to be a trap, and the offending man eventually died of his desire for her (Chapters 11 and 12). Yet she is, without doubt, the most capable woman, if not the most capable character of either sex, within the novel; impartial and harsh in her discipline, she is hailed by her niece-in-law Qin Keqing as "a hero amongst womenfolk". She can be kindhearted towards rustic folks like Granny Liu and poor relatives like Xing Xiuyan (who is not related to her at all but a niece of Lady Xing), but capable of great cruelty when her power is challenged, such as engineering the suicide of her husband's concubine You Erjie, whom Jia Lian married in secrecy, fearing the wrath of his wife.

She has a daughter, her only child from Jia Lian, Jia Qiaojie. In the Cheng-Gao version, when the Jia family collapsed, Qiaojie was sold into a brothel by Xifeng's heartless brother but was rescued by Granny Liu before any harm was done.

Since the last chapters of the original book were lost, it is not known what exactly happened in Cao Xueqin's original ending. But it can be inferred from Xifeng's "panci" (判词, a short poem concluding the fate of a certain character) and other clues that she was probably divorced and abandoned by Jia Lian, thrown in jail, and died on the way to her hometown Jinling.

== See also ==
- Jia Baoyu
