= Cheng–Gao versions =

Editions of Dream of the Red Chamber

In the study of the classic Chinese novel Dream of the Red Chamber, the Cheng-Gao versions or Cheng-Gao editions (程高本) refer to two illustrated, woodblock print editions of the book, published in 1791 and 1792, both entitled The Illustrated Dream of the Red Chamber (绣像红楼梦). The 1791 version, produced at the year's end, was the novel's earliest print edition. A revised edition, differing in minor details, was published less than eighty days after the first print edition in early 1792. Both editions were edited by Cheng Weiyuan (程伟元) and Gao E and were published by Suzhou's Cuiwen Book House (萃文书屋).

The Cheng-Gao versions differed from earlier scribal copies, which were titled The Story of the Stone 石头记). Their edition is known as the Cheng-Gao continuation. This 40-chapter ending is now the continuation read by most readers.

Hu Shih in the 1920s referred to the 1791 version as the Chengjia edition (程甲本, "Cheng-A book") and the 1792 version as the Chengyi edition (程乙本, "Cheng-B book"). These remain the names they are known in the field of Redology. From the mid-20th century until the 1980s the Chengyi edition was the most read, studied and reprinted Dream version in Taiwan owing to Hu Shih's influence. In China, the People's Literature Publishing House (人民文学出版社) published an annotated 1982 edition based on the Rouge versions, effectively ending the era where the Cheng-Gao versions were used extensively. The 1982 People's Literature Publishing House edition was edited by a team of scholars from the "Red Chamber Dream Academy" (红楼梦研究所), which included influential Redologist Feng Qiyong (冯其庸). This 1982 edition was subsequently revised in 2008 and 2015.

Original Cheng-Gao editions are now very rare and are highly prized collector's items – less than twenty copies are believed to be extant.

== The 1791 prefaces ==
Cheng Weiyuan and Gao E wrote prefaces for the 1791 Chengjia edition (程甲本) in Classical Chinese. Both prefaces were short and owing to the brevity of Classical Chinese, are reproduced here in full:

=== Cheng's preface ===
Cheng Weiyuan's 1791 preface was as follows:

《红楼梦》小说本名《石头记》，作者相传不一，究未知出自何人，惟书内记雪芹曹先生删改数过。好事者每传抄一部，置庙市中，昂其值得数十金，可谓不胫而走者矣。然原目一百廿卷，今所传只八十卷，殊非全本。即间称有全部者，及检阅仍只八十卷，读者颇以为憾。不佞以是书既有百廿卷之目，岂无全璧？爰为竭力收罗，自藏书家甚至故纸堆中无不留心，数年以来，仅积有廿余卷。一日偶于鼓担上得十余卷，遂重价购之，欣然翻阅，见其前后起伏，尚属接笋，然漶漫不可收拾。乃同友人细加厘剔，截长补短，抄成全部，复为镌板，以公同好，《红楼梦》全书示自是告成矣。书成，因并志其缘起，以告海内君子。凡我同人，或亦先睹为快者欤？ —小泉程伟元识。 (Simplified Chinese)

《紅樓夢》小說本名《石頭記》，作者相傳不一，究未知出自何人，惟書內記雪芹曹先生刪改數過。好事者每傳抄一部，置廟市中，昂其值，得數十金，可謂不脛而走者矣。然原目一百廿卷，今所傳只八十卷，殊非全本。即間稱有全部者，及檢閱，仍只八十卷，讀者頗以為憾。不佞以是書既有百廿卷之目，豈無全璧？爰為竭力收羅，自藏書家甚至故紙堆中無不留心，數年以來，僅積有廿余卷。一日偶於鼓擔上得十餘卷，遂重價購之，欣然繙閱，見其前後起伏，尚屬接筍，然漶漫不可收拾。乃同友人細加厘剔，截長補短，抄成全部，復為鐫板，以公同好，《紅樓夢》全書始自是告成矣。書成，因並志其緣起，以告海內君子。凡我同人，或亦先睹為快者歟？—小泉程偉元識。 (Traditional Chinese)

In his 1791 preface Cheng Weiyuan stated that the novel, which he renamed Dream of the Red Chamber, was originally entitled The Story of the Stone. It had been ascribed to "different people", the author being unknown, but a certain "Mr" Cao Xueqin (now believed to be the book's true author) edited and revised it several times as was stated in the novel proper. Such was the popularity of the book that contemporaneous temple market scribes could make copies and sell them for several taels of gold. But the book's incomplete, 80-chapter nature disappointed readers. Cheng searched extensively for the remaining chapters, from renowned book collector's libraries to spare paper piles, and in the process collected over "twenty more (i.e. new) chapters". Cheng wrote after several years, to have chanced on "ten more chapters" of the final version from a book vendor (鼓擔), and paid a hefty price for them. Being the working manuscript, however, it was unedited and in disarray. Cheng Weiyuan invited his friend, a scholar/official (Gao E) to edit this version, consulting existing versions, then printed the 120 chapter edition to satiate the appetites of fellow fans.

Later Qing Dynasty editions reprinting the Cheng-Gao versions removed Cheng's preface and used Gao's preface solely.

=== Gao E's preface ===
Gao E's 1791 preface was shorter:

予闻《红楼梦》脍炙人口者，几廿余年，然无全璧，无定本。向曾从友人借观，窃以染指尝鼎为憾。今年春，友人程子小泉过予，以其所购全书见示，且曰：“此仆数年銖积寸累之苦心，将付剞劂，公同好。子閒旦憊矣，盍分任之?”予以是书虽稗官野史之流，然尚不谬于名教，欣然拜诺，正以波斯奴见宝为幸，题襄其役。工既竣，并识端末，以告阅者。—时乾隆辛亥冬至后五日铁岭高鹗叙并书。(Simplified Chinese)

予聞《紅樓夢》膾炙人口者，幾廿餘年，然無全璧，無定本。向曾從友人借觀，竊以染指嘗鼎為憾。今年春，友人程子小泉過予，以其所購全書見示，且曰：“此僕數年銖積寸累之苦心，將付剞劂，公同好。子閒旦憊矣，盍分任之?”予以是書雖稗官野史之流，然尚不謬於名教，欣然拜諾，正以波斯奴見寶為幸，題襄其役。工既竣，並識端末，以告閱者。—時乾隆辛亥冬至後五日鐵嶺高鶚敘並書。(Traditional Chinese)

Gao's preface was penned in 1791 winter, five days after the winter solstice, in Tieling. He revealed the overwhelming popularity of the novel, although there was no final version after "over twenty years". He first read the book at a friend's place since he could not have a share of it (i.e. could not afford its purchase). In spring 1791 Cheng Weiyuan approached Gao to co-edit a "complete" version; Cheng mentioned that he himself was then quite idle but the editing task seemed to him arduous. Gao said that although the novel concerned "unofficial stray anecdotes" (稗官野史) of the past, it did not slander the "orthodox" Confucian classics, and hence he gladly assisted in its editing. Thereafter Gao wrote this preface in appreciation of Cheng's offer of collaboration.

== The 1792 foreword ==
The 1791 preface was replaced with a more impersonal, jointly written foreword, also in Classical Chinese:

一、是书前八十回，藏书家抄录传阅几三十年矣，今得后四十回合成完璧。绿友人借抄，争觀者甚伙，抄录固难，刊板亦需时日，姑集活字刷印。因急欲公诸同好，故初印时不及细校，间有紕缪。今复聚集各原本详加校阅，改订无讹．惟识者谅之。一、书中前八十回抄本，各家互异，今广集核勘，准情酌理，补遗订讹。其间或有增损数字处，意在便于披阅，非敢争胜前人也。一，是书沿传既久，坊间繕本及诸家所藏秘稿，繁简歧出，前后错见。即如六十七回，此有彼无，题同文异，燕石莫辨。茲惟择其情理较协者，取为定本。一、书中后四十回系就历年所得，集腋成裘，更无他本可考。惟按其前后关照者，略为修辑，使其有应接而无矛盾．至其原文，未敢臆改，俟再得善本，更为釐定，且不欲尽掩其本来面目也。一、是书词意新雅，久为名公鉅卿赏鉴，但创始刷印，卷帙较多，工力浩繁，故未加评点。其中用笔吞吐，虚实掩映之妙，识者当自得之。一、向来奇书小说，题序署名，多出名家。是书开卷略誌数语，非云弁首，实因残缺有年，一旦颠末毕具，大陕人心，欣然题名，聊以记成书之幸。一、是书刷印，原为同好传玩起见，后因坊间再四乞兌，爰公议定值，以备工种之费，非谓奇货可居也。—壬子花朝后一日小泉、兰墅又识。(Simplified Chinese)

一、是書前八十回，藏書家抄錄傳閱幾三十年矣，今得後四十回合成完璧。綠友人借抄，爭觀者甚夥，抄錄固難，刊板亦需時日，姑集活字刷印。因急欲公諸同好，故初印時不及細校，間有紕繆。今復聚集各原本詳加校閱，改訂無訛．惟識者諒之。一、書中前八十回抄本，各家互異，今廣集核勘，準情酌理，補遺訂訛。其間或有增損數字處，意在便於披閱，非敢爭勝前人也。一，是書沿傳既久，坊間繕本及諸家所藏秘稿，繁簡歧出，前後錯見。即如六十七回，此有彼無，題同文異，燕石莫辨。茲惟擇其情理較協者，取為定本。一、書中後四十回係就歷年所得，集腋成裘，更無他本可考。惟按其前後關照者，略為修輯，使其有應接而無矛盾．至其原文，未敢臆改，俟再得善本，更為釐定，且不欲盡掩其本來面目也。一、是書詞意新雅，久為名公鉅卿賞鑑，但創始刷印，卷帙較多，工力浩繁，故未加評點。其中用筆吞吐，虛實掩映之妙，識者當自得之。一、向來奇書小說，題序署名，多出名家。是書開卷略誌數語，非雲弁首，實因殘缺有年，一旦顛末畢具，大陝人心，欣然題名，聊以記成書之幸。一、是書刷印，原為同好傳玩起見，後因坊間再四乞兌，爰公議定值，以備工種之費，非謂奇貨可居也。—壬子花朝後一日小泉、蘭墅又識。(Traditional Chinese)

The foreword was dated March 5, 1792 (壬子花朝後一日). 1. The first eighty chapters of this book have been copied and circulated by book collectors for thirty years. Now, the last forty chapters have been compiled into a complete version. Many friends have borrowed copies, and many have eagerly awaited them. Copying is difficult, and printing takes time, too. So, I've assembled movable type to print it. Because I'm anxious to share it with fellow enthusiasts, I didn't have time to proofread it carefully during the initial printing, and there are occasional omissions. Now, I've collected all the originals, carefully reviewed them, and revised them to ensure they are correct. Those who understand this are welcome to share. 1. Various copies of the first eighty chapters of this book differed from one another. We have now compiled and verified them, correcting any omissions as appropriate. Some additions and deletions may have occurred, but this is intended to facilitate the reader, not to vie with previous versions. First, because this book has been handed down for so long, the surviving copies and the secret manuscripts held by various collectors have different levels of complexity and simplicity, and some have been misinterpreted. For example, in Chapter 67, some are present but others are absent, the title is the same but the text is different, and even Yan Shi is unable to distinguish. I have chosen the most consistent version as the definitive edition. 1. The last 40 chapters of the book are based on what I have learned over the years, and there is no other version to examine. I have only slightly revised them to make them coherent and without contradictions, taking into account the connection between the previous and subsequent chapters. As for the original text, I have not dared to change it arbitrarily, and will further verify it when I find another good copy, and I do not want to completely obscure its original appearance. 1. This book is novel and elegant in its language and has long been appreciated by famous officials. However, since it was first printed, it has many volumes and the labor required is enormous, so I have not commented on it. The wonderful use of the pen and the interplay of reality and illusion will be appreciated by those who are knowledgeable. 1. The prefaces and signatures of rare books and novels are often written by famous authors. I begin this book with a few words, not as a preface, but because it has been incomplete for years, and now that it is finally complete, it has greatly pleased everyone, so I am pleased to give it this title, as a token of my happiness at its completion. First, this book was originally printed for the enjoyment of fellow enthusiasts. Later, due to repeated requests for it, we have agreed to a price to cover the cost of the work, not because it is a rare commodity.

== Authorship ==
In 1921, Hu Shih published one of the most influential Redology essays in the modern era, Studies on A Dream of the Red Chamber (红楼梦考证). In it Hu Shih proposed the hypothesis that the last forty chapters were not written by Cao Xueqin but were completed by Gao E. Hu Shih based his hypothesis on four pieces of evidence – though three of them were circumstantial and Hu Shih was himself uncertain of his second proof. He went on to accuse Cheng and Gao of being dishonest in their 1791 prefaces, stating direct evidence from a contemporary, Zhang Wentao (张问陶), that Gao was the author of the continuation. The conclusion, in Hu Shih's own words, was irrefutable (自无可疑). His stand was supported by Zhou Ruchang and Liu Xinwu. Another Redologist, Yu Pingbo, originally supported this proposition, but later retracted it.

Modern Redologists continue to be skeptical about the authenticity of the Cheng-Gao ending, partly owing to stylistic differences, and also because the many foreshadowings in the earlier 80 chapters are not precisely fulfilled in the subsequent chapters.
