= Lin Daiyu =

Classic Chinese novel character

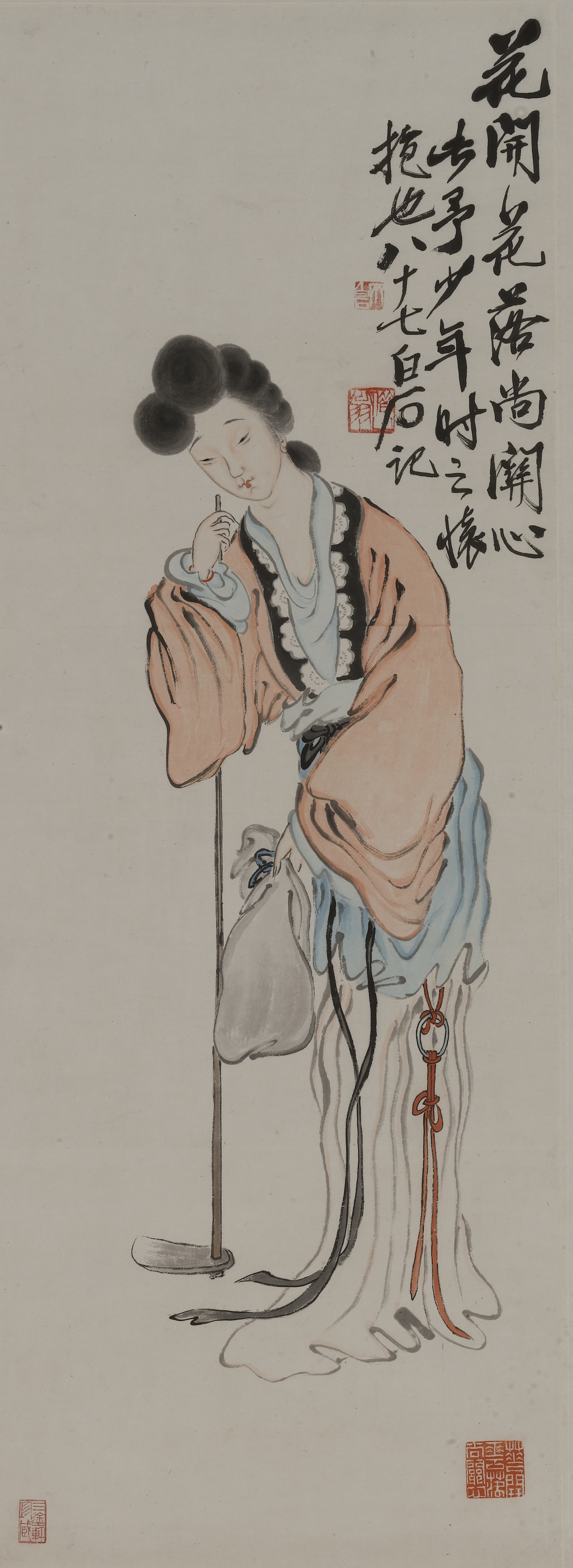
Daiyu Buries Flowers, a painting dated 1950

Lin Daiyu (also spelled Lin Tai-yu, Chinese: 林黛玉; pinyin: Lín Dàiyù, rendered Black Jade in Chi-chen Wang's translation) is one of the principal characters of Cao Xueqin's classic 18th-century Chinese novel Dream of the Red Chamber. She is portrayed as a well-educated, intelligent, witty and beautiful young woman of physical frailness who is somewhat prone to occasional melancholy. The love triangle between Daiyu, Jia Baoyu and Xue Baochai forms one of the main threads of the book.

Lin has become one of the most loved, controversial and written-about Chinese literary characters, due to the complexity of her depictions and the compassionate nature of her portrayal in the novel by Cao.

== Life ==
In the framing chapters, Lin Daiyu was a flower who was later incarnated as Daiyu to pay back her "debt of tears" to Jia Baoyu, who watered and gave life to the flower. Lin and Jia were the only two characters in the book that were coming from the illusory world.

Born to a Suzhou scholar-official, Lin Ruhai, and Lady Jia Min of the Rongguo house, Daiyu was raised by her parents in her family's mansion in nearby Yangzhou, where she received an excellent education. She has a natural affinity for literature and learns exceptionally well. Her childhood tutor is Jia Yucun (贾雨村).

During her childhood, a Buddhist monk once proposed to take her away to save her from a tragic fate. This was of course, rejected. Having a naturally weak constitution she has been taking medicine and tonic from a very young age, and this resulted in her somewhat willowy build and ethereal beauty.

At the age of six Daiyu lost her mother; shortly after she is summoned to the capital to be with her maternal grandmother, the powerful Jia Clan matriarch, Grandmother Jia. She immediately bonds with Jia Baoyu, her maternal cousin and her grandmother's favorite, and with the many girl cousins in the house. Daiyu's father dies a few years after her entry into the Rongguo House, leaving her a complete orphan. She is one of Grandmother Jia's most doted-on grandchildren.

Daiyu is an emotional girl, prone to extreme mood swings and melancholic spells. She is described as having been sickly since childhood; indeed, when she is first introduced, a couplet describes her "with a heart like Bi Gan's, yet even more intelligent; and with an illness like Xi Zi, yet even more beautiful". Her disposition to frowning leads Baoyu to give her the courtesy name of Pin'pin (颦颦) or Frowner, when they first meet.

One of the enduring images of Daiyu, often portrayed in Chinese art and re-enacted in Chinese operas, is "Daiyu burying the flowers" (黛玉葬花, Chapters 27–8). Overcome by a spell of melancholy after a misunderstanding with Baoyu, Daiyu goes to the garden to bury fallen petals at a hillside, wrapping them in silk to keep them pure, and falls in deep weeping at their (and her own) transience. She composed an elegiac ballad for the dead petals, which evokes a sympathetic response in the eavesdropping Baoyu.

“Now you are dead and gone,
I gather you for the grave,
And I’m not yet able to foretell
when my own death will be mourned.

Daiyu's emotional tirades make sense in the context of the supernatural. Daiyu is a reincarnated Crimson Pearl Flower that through good care by a Divine Attendant-in-Waiting in the heavens (the reincarnation of which is Baoyu) was imbued with sentient life. In exchange for this gift, the flower vowed to be reincarnated as a human, and pay back her caregiver in the form of as many tears as a person may weep in a lifetime.

== Contrast with Xue Baochai ==
The character of Lin Daiyu contrasts with that of Baoyu's other cousin, Xue Baochai. The two principal female characters are probably conceived as foils to each other. Both are intimately linked with Jia Baoyu, one as his true love and the other as his betrothed, and each shares a single character in their given name with Baoyu. Even their physical attributes are opposites: Daiyu is slender and willowy while Baochai is likened to Yang Guifei for her fuller build. Both Daiyu and Baochai take tonics although Daiyu is noticeably weaker, presumably because she has a consumptive nature.

The two women are complements of one another – each has exactly the attributes of Cao Xueqin's ideal woman which the other lacks. Daiyu is melancholic, hyper-sensitive and is an instinctive poet who feels strongly about people, events and nature. She is sensitive to malicious gossip but feels insecure and lonely despite her high standing in the Rongguo household. Daiyu can be roused easily to jealousy and makes spiteful, sarcastic remarks, which are interpreted as "tantrums" by her maids. In contrast, Xue Baochai is a darling to the maids and the ladies in the house. Her tactful, prudent nature gets her into much less trouble than Daiyu. Nonetheless, Baochai lacks an emotional bond with Baoyu and is reflected in the book as a model wife and an excellent "manager" of the family.

Baoyu's maid Qingwen (晴雯) is often considered to be Daiyu's "double", in that they have similar temperaments and a similar "ethereal" beauty.

== Modern-day references ==
- The crater Tai-yu on asteroid 433 Eros was named after her.
- In the song "Games Without Frontiers" by Peter Gabriel, Lin Tai Yu is mentioned.
- In the novel "Want" by Cindy Pon, the heroine Daiyu is named after Tai-yu.
- In the novel "Four Treasures of the Sky" by Jenny Tinghui Zhang, the heroine is named after Lin Daiyu.
- In Limbus Company, Lin Daiyu debuts during Canto VIII: The Surrendered Witnessing as a supporting character. However, rather than being the cousin of Jia Baoyu, a.k.a. Hong Lu, she is instead his intimate friend and also a servant of the Xue family.

== References and further reading ==
- Bech, Lene (2002). "Flowers in the Mirror, Moonlight on the Water: Images of a Deluded Mind". Chinese Literature: Essays, Articles, Reviews. 24: 99–128. doi:10.2307/823478. JSTOR 823478.
- Rouzer, Paul (2016), Waltner, Anne (ed.), Daiyu's flower burial poem (Chapter 27) (PDF), University of Minnesota Libraries
