= Lady Wang =

Character in 18th-century Chinese novel

Lady Wang (王夫人) is a character in the classic Chinese 18th-century novel Dream of the Red Chamber. She is the wife of Jia Zheng, and mother of Jia Zhu (dead at the start of the novel), Jia Yuanchun and Jia Baoyu. She is the elder sister of Aunt Xue and hence the maternal aunt to Xue Baochai and Xue Pan.

She is on the surface a kind lady and a devout Buddhist, who delegates authority to her niece Wang Xifeng in the everyday running of the Rongguo household. However, she is prone to malicious rumors, and can act with cruelty towards maids she thinks are seducing her son. Lady Wang is one of the culprits resulting in the death of Baoyu's maid Qingwen.

When the character Jia Xichun shaves her head to join a nunnery, Lady Wang reluctantly consents, expressing her disapproval: "It would look very bad for a girl from a family such as ours to enter a nunnery. That is really unthinkable."
