= Jia Baoyu =

Chinese fictional character

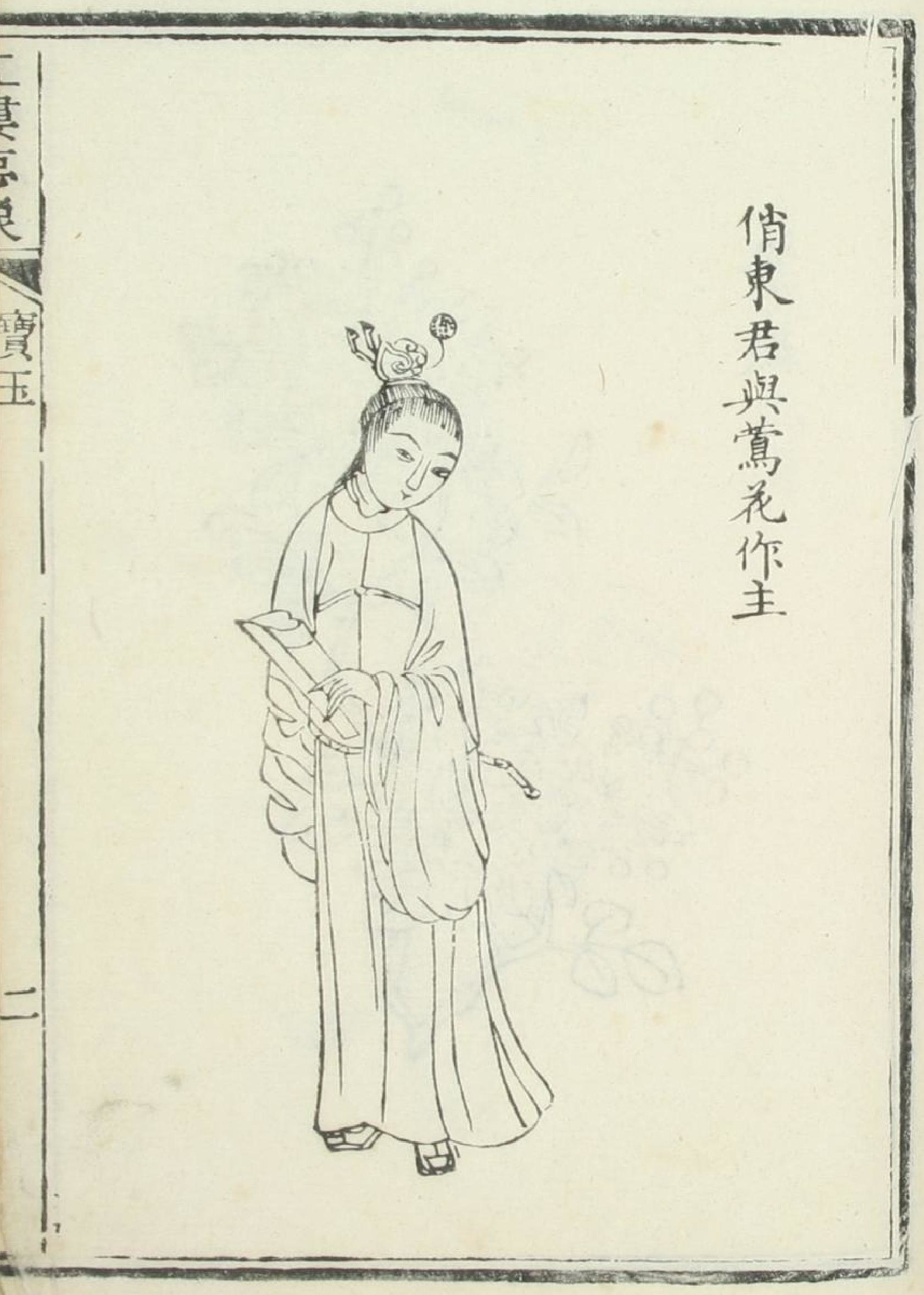
- An 1832 illustration of Jia Baoyu
- Spouse: Xue Baochai (cousin by maternal aunt)
- Parent(s): Jia Zheng (father); Lady Wang (mother)
- Relatives: Jia Zhu (deceased elder brother); Jia Yuanchun (elder sister); Jia Huan (younger half-brother); Jia Tanchun (younger half-sister); Lin Daiyu (cousin by paternal aunt and love interest); Hua Xiren (unofficial concubine)

Jia Baoyu
- Traditional Chinese: 賈寶玉
- Simplified Chinese: 贾宝玉
Transcriptions
Standard Mandarin
- Hanyu Pinyin: Jiǎ Bǎoyù
- Wade–Giles: Chia^{3} Pao^{3}-yü^{4}
- IPA: [tɕjà pàʊ.ŷ]
Yue: Cantonese
- Yale Romanization: Gáa Bóuyuhk
- Jyutping: Gaa2 Bou2-juk6
- IPA: [ka˧˥ pɔw˧˥.jʊk̚˨]

Jia Baoyu (Chinese: 賈寶玉) is the principal character in the classic 18th century Chinese novel Dream of the Red Chamber.

== Introduction ==
The first chapter describes how one piece of stone was left over from when the Wall of Heaven was repaired by the Goddess Nüwa. That stone, changed into a piece of luminous jade, is given a chance (as requested by itself) to learn from the human existence and the impermanence of human life by following another incarnation who is to be Jia Baoyu.

Baoyu is thus born with a magical piece of jade in his mouth. His name, which literally means "precious jade", was given him in honor of this. The jade and Baoyu share a mystical link, and the Cheng-Gao version ends after the jade is lost for good and Baoyu himself disappears. Baoyu is portrayed as having little interest in learning the Confucian classics, much to the despair of his father, Jia Zheng. He would rather spend his time reading or writing poetry and playing with his numerous female relations. He is by-nature very compassionate and thoughtful (perhaps as a juxtaposition onto the other male characters in the novel).

Lin Daiyu was a fairy flower (known as the Jiang Zhu Cao), was later incarnated as Daiyu to pay back her “debt of tears" to Jia Baoyu, who watered and gave life to the flower.

Baoyu's romance and relationship with Lin Daiyu and Xue Baochai forms one of the novel's main plot lines. However, there are many other women who play an important part in his life. In particular, he is a darling of his grandmother, who dotes on him and occasionally shields him from his father. His principal maids are also worthy of note.

The crater Pao-yu on asteroid 433 Eros was named after him.

== Alter ego: Zhen Baoyu ==
There is another Baoyu in the novel, a minor character with the surname of "Zhen" (甄), a homophone for "truth" or "real" in Mandarin. Zhen Baoyu shares many of Jia Baoyu's characteristics, living in a wealthy clan with many attendants and cousins, although he lives in Jinling (now Nanjing) rather than in the capital.

In Zhiyanzhai's commentary, it is clear that Zhen Baoyu would have had a large part to play in the later parts of the novel, now lost. He is to send Jia Baoyu's jade back when it goes missing. Zhen Baoyu, like Jia Baoyu, also becomes a monk at the end. Hence, Zhen Baoyu can be said to be a mirror of Jia Baoyu, just as the fortunes of the fictitious Jia Clan are mirrored in those of the Zhen Clan (the "real" family).

== See also ==
- Lin Daiyu
- Xue Baochai
- Shi Xiangyun
- Wang Xifeng
