= Ping'er =

Character in the 18th century Chinese novel "Dream of the Red Chamber"

Ping'er (Chinese: 平兒; pinyin: Píng'ér; literally "Peace", and known as “Patience” in the Hawkes translation) is an important character in the 18th century Chinese novel Dream of the Red Chamber. She is Wang Xifeng's chief maid and personal assistant/confidante, who follows her from the Wang family. Being the chief consultant of the household manager, Ping'er wields considerable power in the Jia household. Always kind and caring, she turns big dilemmas into little, solvable problems. She does so with grace and impartiality and is respected by most other servants.

She is the cause of many fights between her mistress and master, partly because she is Jia Lian's unofficial concubine (seen as a dowry from the Wang family). Nevertheless, she is well loved by them, too, especially by Xifeng, who understands her value as a personal confidante. The novel portrays Ping'er as a pretty and sweet-natured girl, though clearly intelligent enough to know how to conduct herself through the politics of the family.

In the Cheng-Gao ending, when Xifeng's daughter Jia Qiaojie is left motherless after Xifeng's death, Ping'er arranges the plan for Granny Liu to hide Qiaojie in her village, and accompanied Qiaojie to Granny Liu's home. She eventually becomes Jia Lian's wife.
