= Dream of the Red Chamber =

Vernacular Chinese novel by Cao Xueqin

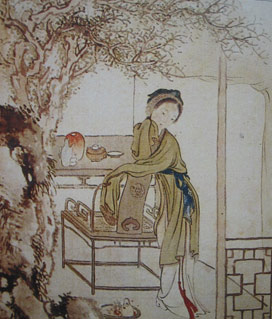
- A scene from the novel, painted by Xu Baozhuan (1810–1873)
- Author: Cao Xueqin
- Original title: 紅樓夢
- Language: Chinese
- Genre: Family saga, encyclopedic novel, philosophical novel
- Publication date: Mid-18th century (manuscripts); 1791 (first printed edition)
- Publication place: China
- English publication date: 1868, 1892; 1973–1980 (first complete English translation)
- Dewey Decimal: 895.1348

Dream of the Red Chamber
- "Dream of the Red Chamber" in traditional (top) and simplified (bottom) Chinese characters
- Traditional Chinese: 紅樓夢
- Simplified Chinese: 红楼梦
Transcriptions
Standard Mandarin
- Hanyu Pinyin: Hóng lóu mèng
- Wade–Giles: Hung^{2} lou^{2} mêng^{4}
- IPA: [xʊ̌ŋ lǒʊ mə̂ŋ]
Wu
- Romanization: Ghon leu mon
Yue: Cantonese
- Yale Romanization: Hùhng làuh muhng
- Jyutping: hung^{4} lau^{4} mung^{6}
- IPA: [hʊŋ˩ lɐw˩ mʊŋ˨]
Southern Min
- Tâi-lô: Âng lâu bāng

Alternative Chinese name
- Traditional Chinese: 石頭記
- Simplified Chinese: 石头记
- Literal meaning: "Records of the Stone"
Transcriptions
Standard Mandarin
- Hanyu Pinyin: Shítóu jì
- Wade–Giles: Shih^{2}-tʻou^{2} chi^{4}
- IPA: [ʂɻ̩̌.tʰǒʊ tɕî]
Wu
- Romanization: Zah deu ci
Yue: Cantonese
- Yale Romanization: Sehk-tàuh gei
- Jyutping: Sek6-tau4 gei3
- IPA: [sɛk̚˨.tʰɐw˩ kej˧]
Southern Min
- Tâi-lô: Tsio̍h-thâu kì

Dream of the Red Chamber (simplified Chinese: 红楼梦; traditional Chinese: 紅樓夢; pinyin: hónɡ lóu mènɡ, also translated as Red Chamber Dream, A Dream of Red Mansions) or The Story of the Stone (simplified Chinese: 石头记; traditional Chinese: 石頭記; pinyin: shí tóu jì) is an 18th-century Chinese novel authored by Cao Xueqin, considered to be one of the Four Great Classic Novels of Chinese literature. It is known for its psychological scope and its observation of the worldview, aesthetics, lifestyles, and social relations of High Qing China.

The intricate strands of its plot depict the rise and decline of a family much like Cao's own. Cao depicts the power of the father over the family, but the novel is intended to be a memorial to the women he knew in his youth: friends, relatives and servants. At a more profound level, the author explores religious and philosophical questions, and the writing style includes echoes of the plays and novels of the late Ming, as well as poetry from earlier periods.

Cao began composing it in the 1740s and worked on it until his death in 1763 or 1764. Copies of his incomplete manuscript circulated in Cao's social circle, under the title Story of a Stone, in slightly varying versions of eighty chapters. It was not published until nearly three decades after Cao's death, when Gao E and Cheng Weiyuan (程偉元) edited the first and second printed editions under the title Dream of the Red Chamber from 1791 to 1792, adding 40 chapters. Their 120-chapter edition became the most widely circulated version. Redology is the field of study devoted to the novel.

== Language ==
The novel is composed in written vernacular (baihua) rather than Classical Chinese (wenyan). Cao Xueqin was highly proficient in both Chinese poetry and Classical Chinese, having composed essays in a semi-wenyan style. The novel's dialogue, however, is rendered in the Beijing Mandarin dialect, which later became the foundation of modern spoken Chinese. In the early 20th century, lexicographers used the text to establish the vocabulary of the new standardised language and reformers used the novel to promote the written vernacular.

== History ==
=== Textual history ===
Dream of the Red Chamber has a complicated textual history that scholars have long debated. It is known with certainty that Cao Xueqin began writing the novel in the 1740s. Cao was a member of a prominent Chinese family that had served the Manchu emperors of the Qing dynasty but whose fortunes had begun to decline. By the time of Cao's death in 1763 or 1764, the first 80 chapters of the novel were complete and hand-copied manuscripts of them had begun circulating. Cao may have also written drafts of the remaining chapters. These hand-copied manuscripts circulated first among his personal friends and a growing circle of aficionados, then eventually on the open market where they sold for large sums of money.

The first printed version of Dream of the Red Chamber, published in 1791 by Cheng Weiyuan and Gao E, contains edits and revisions that Cao never authorized. It is possible that Cao destroyed the last chapters or that at least parts of Cao's original ending were incorporated into the 120 chapter Cheng-Gao versions, with Gao E's "careful emendations" of Cao's draft.

==== "Rouge" versions ====
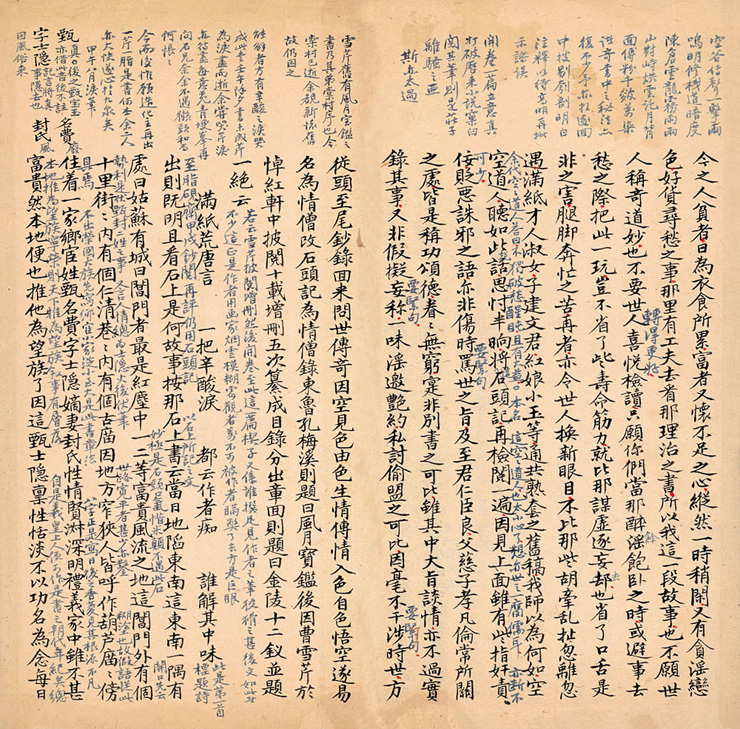
A page from the "Jimao manuscript" (one of the Rouge versions) of the novel, 1759

Up until 1791, the novel circulated in hand-copied manuscripts. Even amongst some 12 independent surviving manuscripts, small differences in some characters, rearrangements and possible rewritings cause the texts to vary a little. The earliest manuscripts end abruptly at the latest at the 80th chapter. The earlier versions contain comments and annotations in red or black ink from unknown commentators. These commentators' remarks reveal much about the author as a person, and it is now believed that some of them may even be members of Cao Xueqin's own family. The most prominent commentator is Zhiyanzhai, who revealed much of the interior structuring of the work and the original manuscript ending, now lost. These manuscripts, the most textually reliable versions, are known as "rouge versions" (脂本; zhīběn).

The early 80 chapters brim with prophecies and dramatic foreshadowings that give hints as to how the book would continue. For example, it is obvious that Lin Daiyu will eventually die in the course of the novel; that Baoyu and Baochai will marry; that Baoyu will become a monk. A branch of Redology, known as tanyi xue (探佚學), is focused on recovering the lost manuscript ending, based on the commentators' annotations in the Rouge versions, as well as the internal foreshadowings in the earlier 80 chapters.

Several early manuscripts are still extant. At the present, the "Jiaxu manuscript" (dating to 1754) is held in the Shanghai Museum, the "Jimao manuscript" (1759) is held in the National Library of China, and the "Gengchen manuscript" (1760) is held in the library of Peking University. Beijing Normal University and the Institute of Oriental Studies of the Russian Academy of Sciences both also held manuscripts of the novel that predate the first printed edition of 1791.

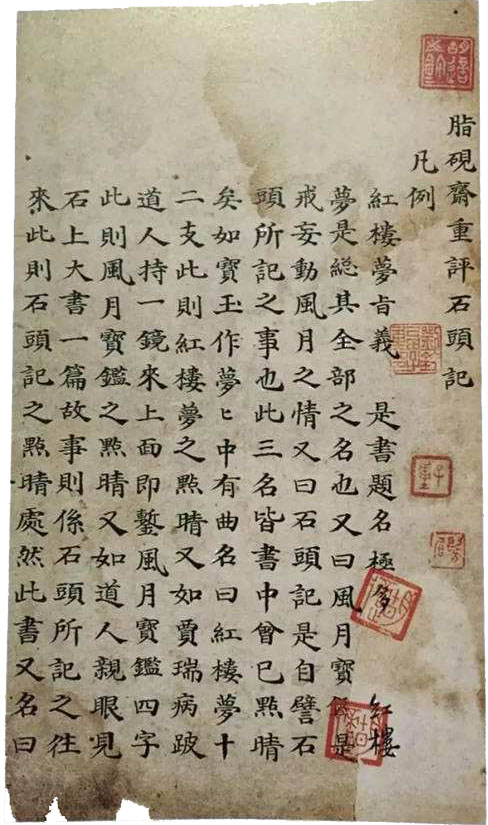
The "Jiaxu manuscript", 1754

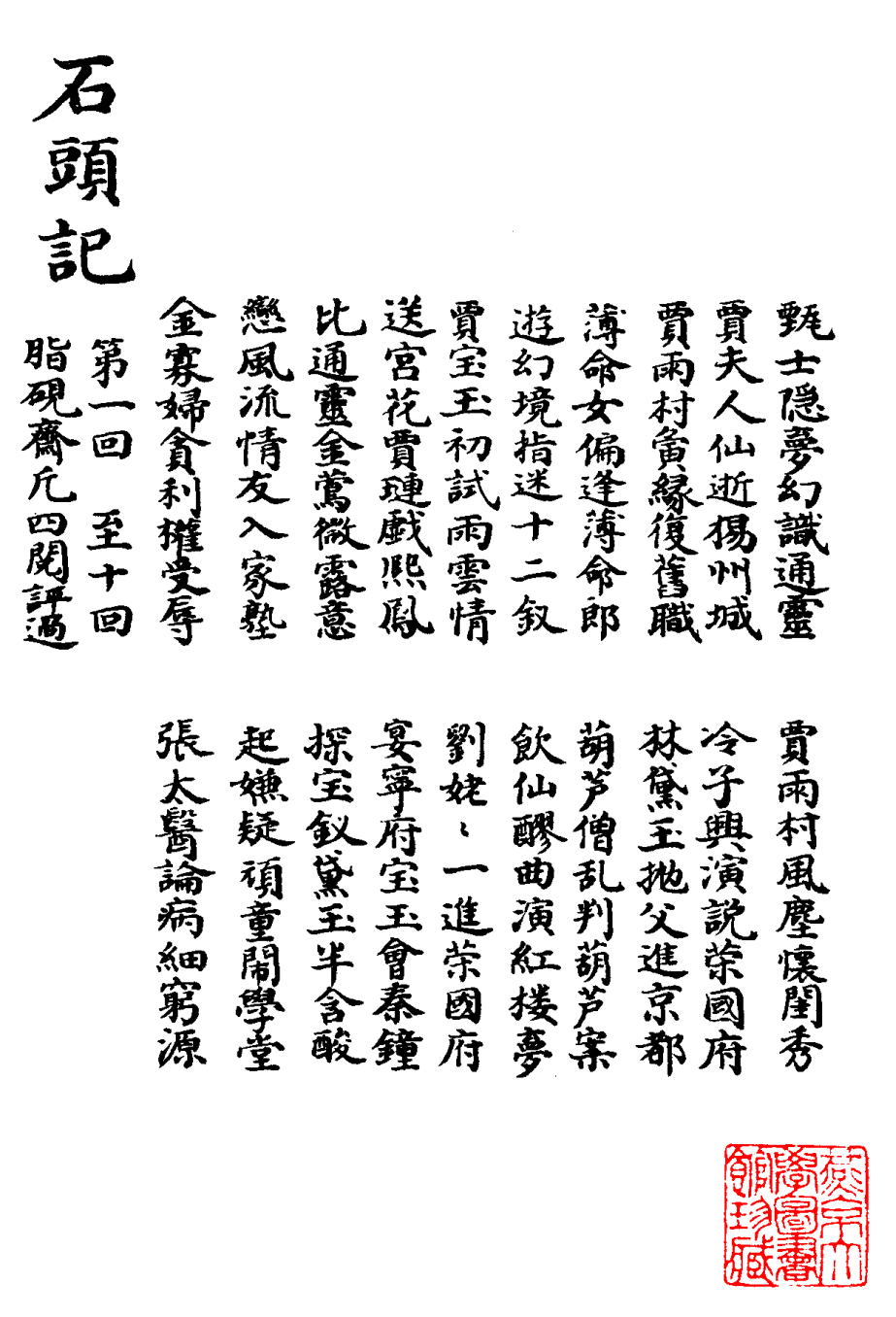
The "Gengchen manuscript", 1760

==== Cheng–Gao versions ====
In 1791, Gao E and Cheng Weiyuan brought out the novel's first printed edition. This was also the first "complete" edition of The Story of the Stone, which they printed as the Illustrated Dream of the Red Chamber (Xiùxiàng Hóng Lóu Mèng 繡像紅樓夢). While the original Rouge manuscripts have eighty chapters, the 1791 edition completed the novel in 120 chapters. The first 80 chapters were edited from the Rouge versions, but the last 40 were newly published.

In 1792, Cheng and Gao published a second edition correcting editorial errors of the 1791 version. In the 1791 prefaces, Cheng claimed to have put together an ending based on the author's working manuscripts.

The debate over the last 40 chapters and the 1791–92 prefaces continues to this day. Many modern scholars believe these chapters were a later addition. Hu Shih, in his Studies on A Dream of the Red Chamber (1921) argued that these chapters were written by Gao E, citing the foreshadowing of the main characters' fates in Chapter 5, which differs from the ending of the 1791 Cheng-Gao version. However, during the mid-20th century, the discovery of a 120 chapter manuscript that dates well before 1791 further complicated the questions regarding Gao E and Cheng Weiyuan's involvement—whether they simply edited Cao Xueqin's work or actually wrote the continuation of the novel. Though it is unclear if the last 40 chapters of the discovered manuscript contained the original works of Cao, Irene Eber found the discovery "seems to confirm Cheng and Gao's claim that they merely edited a complete manuscript, consisting of 120 chapters, rather than actually writing a portion of the novel".

The book is usually published and read in Cheng Weiyuan and Gao E's 120 chapter version. Some modern editions, such as Zhou Ruchang's, do not include the last 40 chapters.

In 2014, three researchers using data analysis of writing styles announced that "Applying our method to the Cheng–Gao version of Dream of the Red Chamber has led to convincing if not irrefutable evidence that the first 80 chapters and the last 40 chapters of the book were written by two different authors."

In 2020, Zhang Qingshan, the president of the academic organization Society of the Dream of the Red Chamber, stated that although the authorship of the novel's last 40 chapters remains uncertain, it is unlikely Gao E was the one who wrote them.

== Plot summary ==
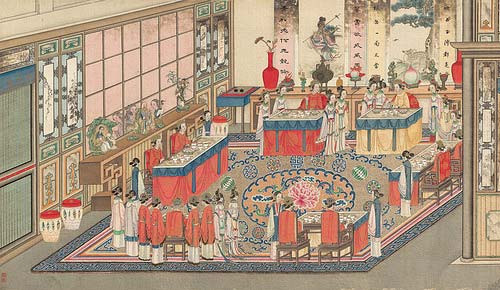
A piece from a series of brush paintings by the Qing dynasty artist Sun Wen (1818–1904), depicting a scene from the novel

In the novel's frame story, a sentient Stone, left over when the goddess Nüwa mended the heaven aeons ago, wants to enjoy the pleasures of the "red dust" (the mundane world). The Stone begs a Taoist priest and a Buddhist monk to take it with them to see the world. The Stone, along with a companion (in Cheng-Gao versions they are merged into the same character), is then given a chance to learn from human existence, and enters the mortal realm. In the Cheng-Gao versions, he is reborn as Jia Baoyu ("Precious Jade") – thus "The Story of the Stone".

The novel provides a detailed, episodic record of life in the two branches of the wealthy, aristocratic Jia (賈) clan—the Rongguo House (榮國府) and the Ningguo House (寧國府)—who reside in large, adjacent family compounds in the capital. The capital, however, is not named, and the first chapter insists that the dynasty is indeterminate. The ancestors of the two families were made Chinese nobility and given imperial titles, and as the novel begins the houses are two of the most illustrious families in the city. One of the Jia daughters is made a Royal Consort, and to suitably receive her, the family constructs the Daguanyuan, a lush landscaped garden, the setting for much of subsequent action. The novel describes the Jias' wealth and influence in great naturalistic detail, and charts the Jias' fall from the height of their prestige, following some thirty main characters and over four hundred minor ones.

As the carefree adolescent male heir of the family, Baoyu in this life has a special bond with his sickly and melancholic cousin Lin Daiyu, who shares his love of music and poetry. Baoyu, however, is predestined to marry another cousin, Xue Baochai, whose grace and intelligence exemplify an ideal woman, but with whom he lacks an emotional connection. The romantic rivalry and friendship among the three characters against the backdrop of the family's declining fortunes form the central story.

A series of paintings by Fei Danxu (1801–1850) depicting scenes from the novel:
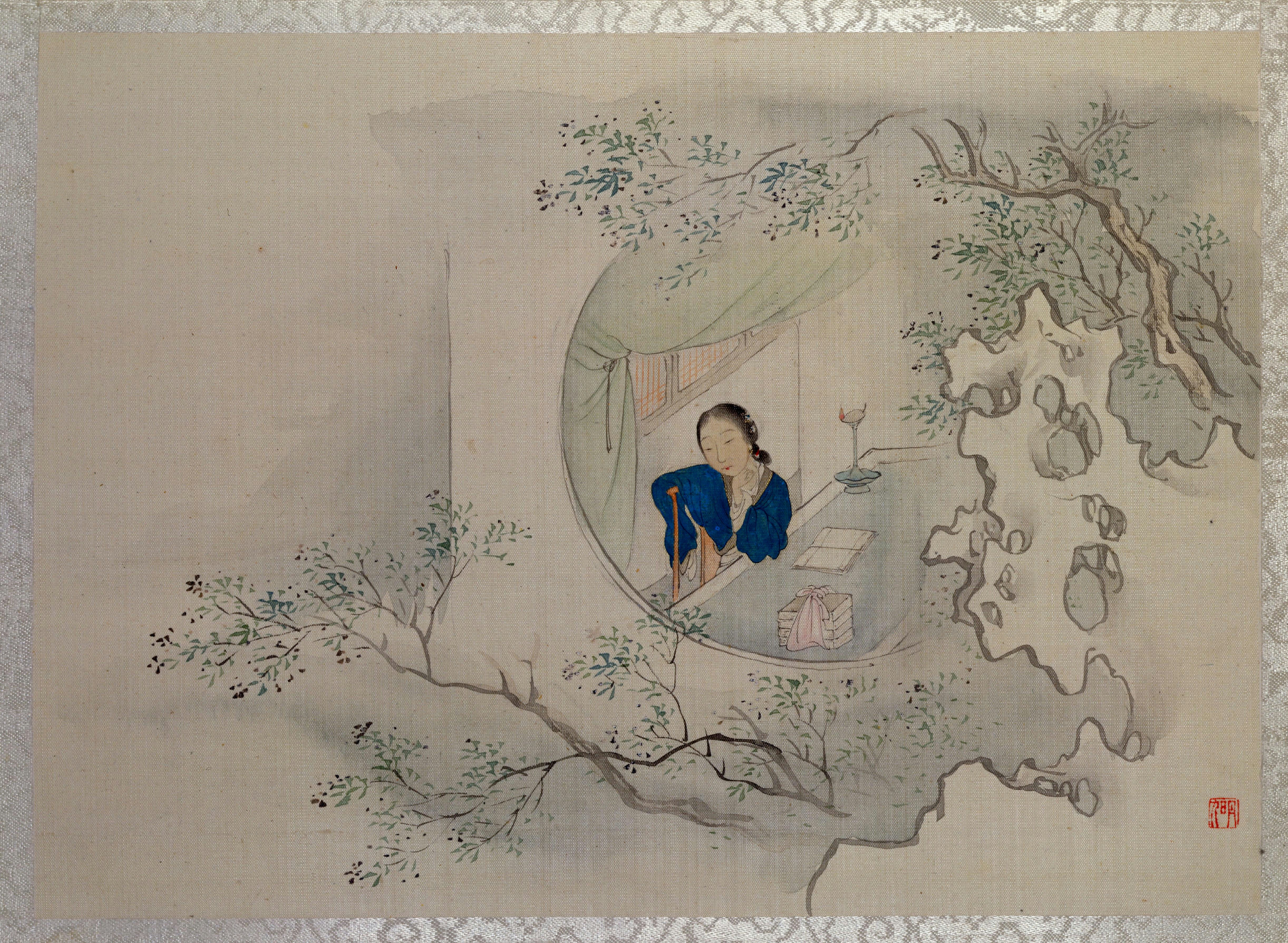

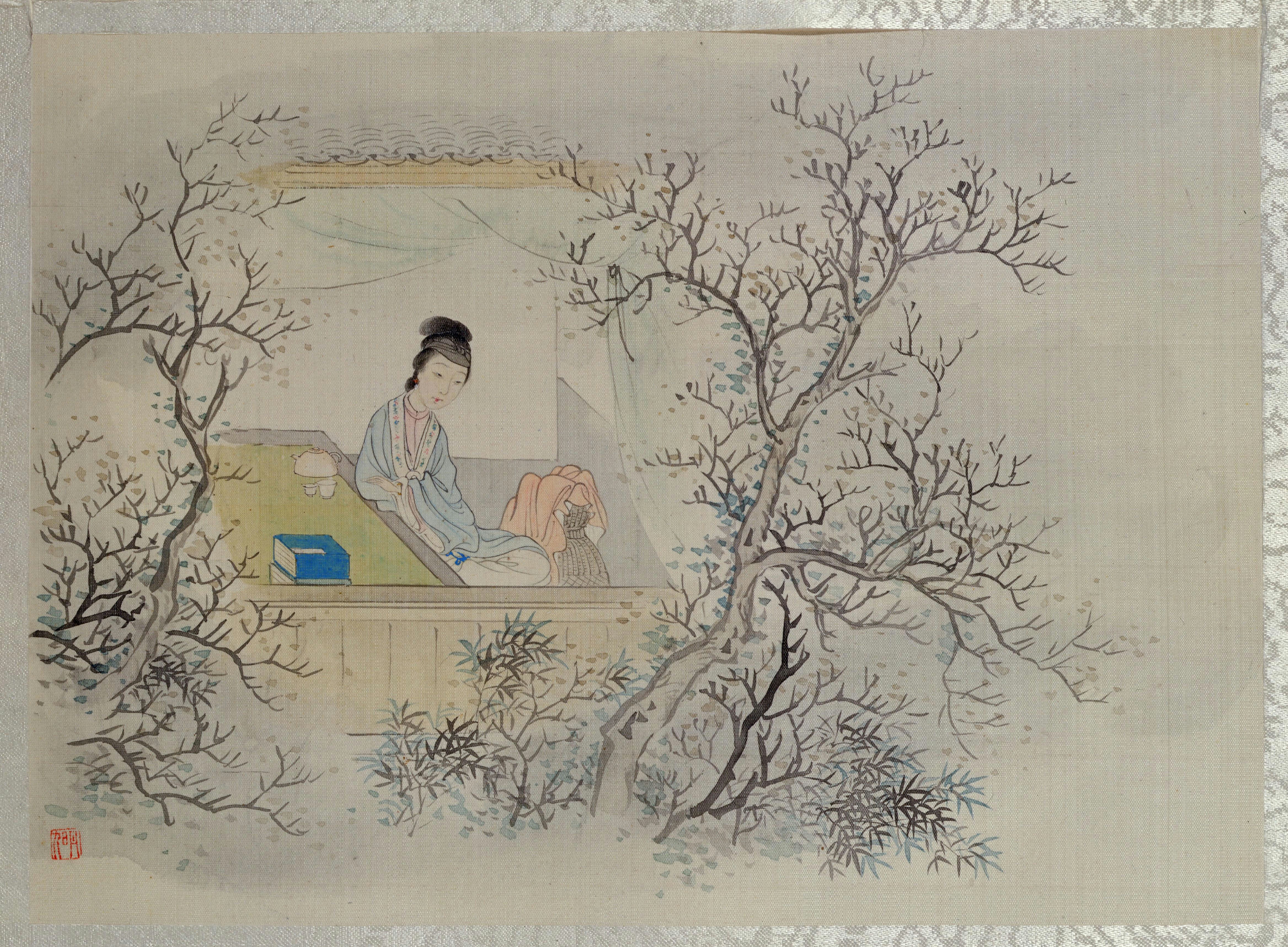

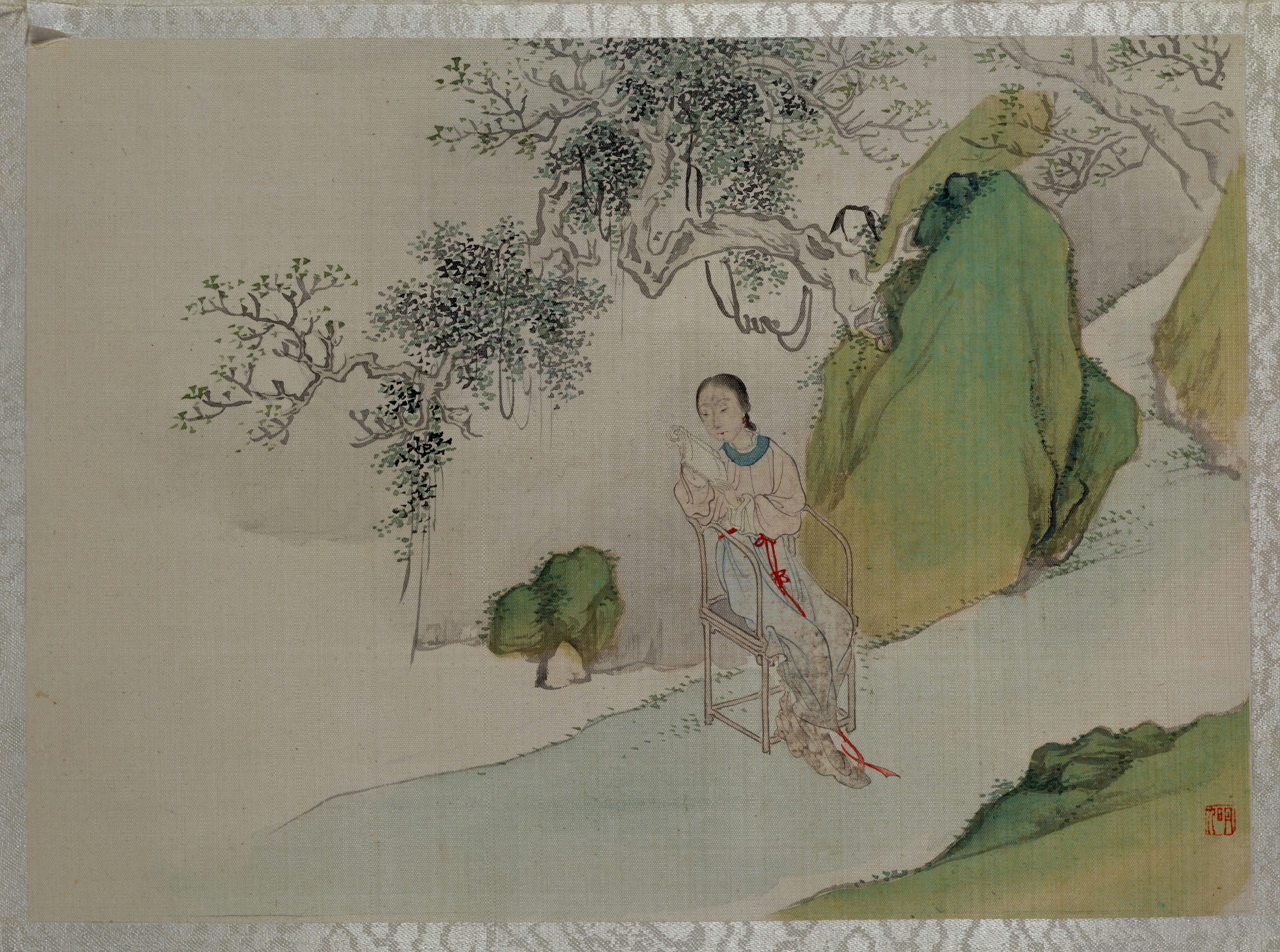

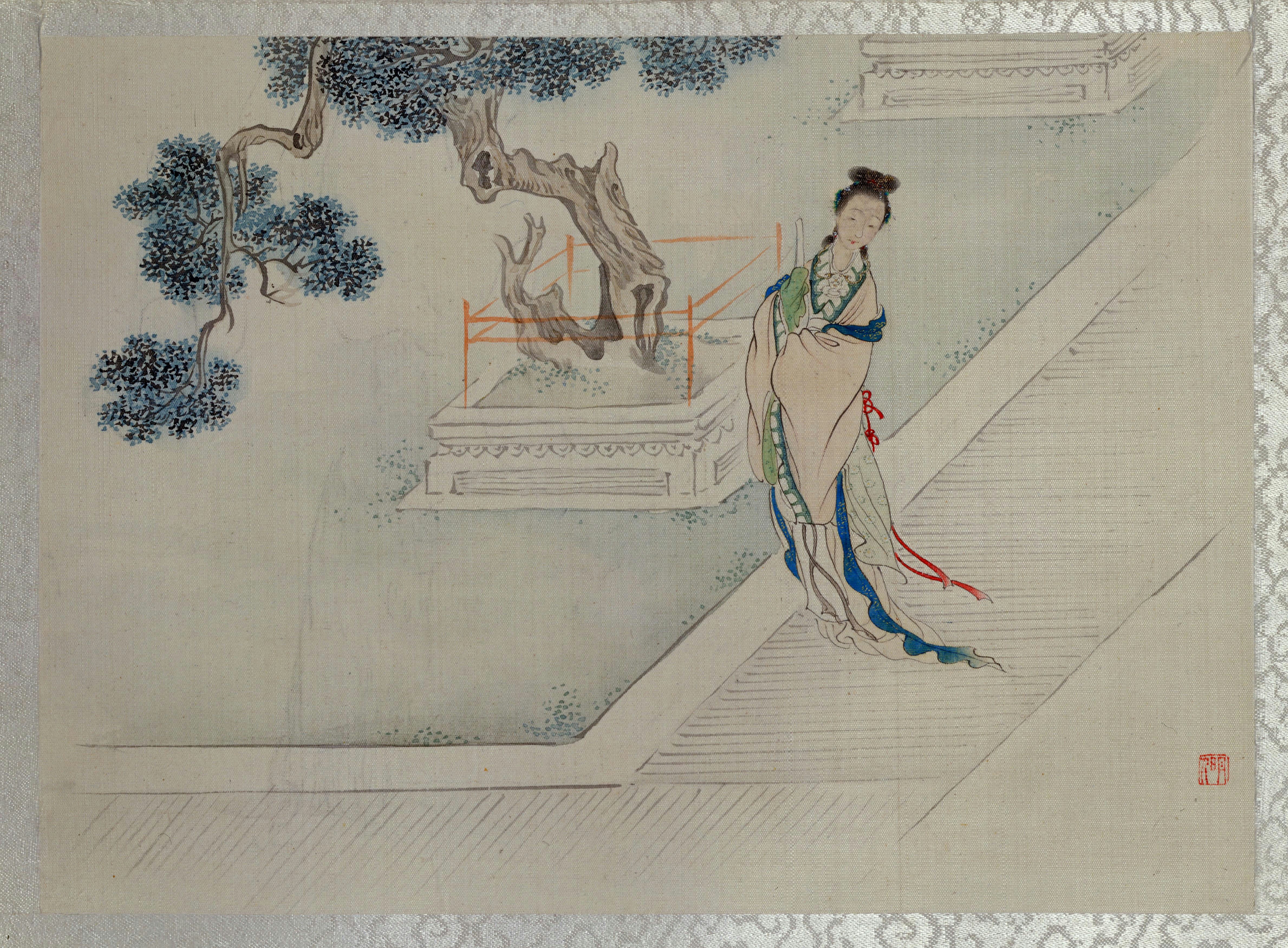

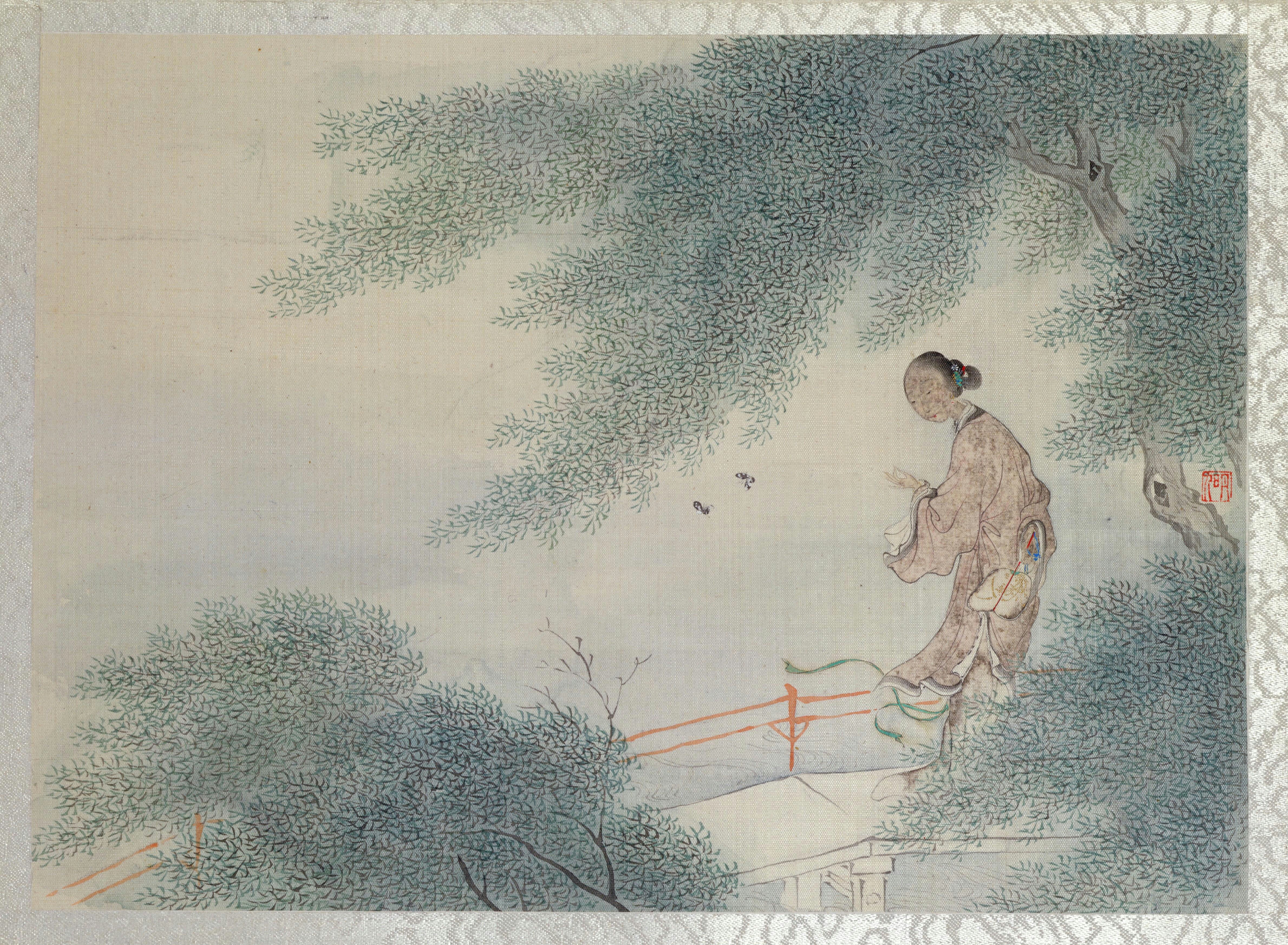

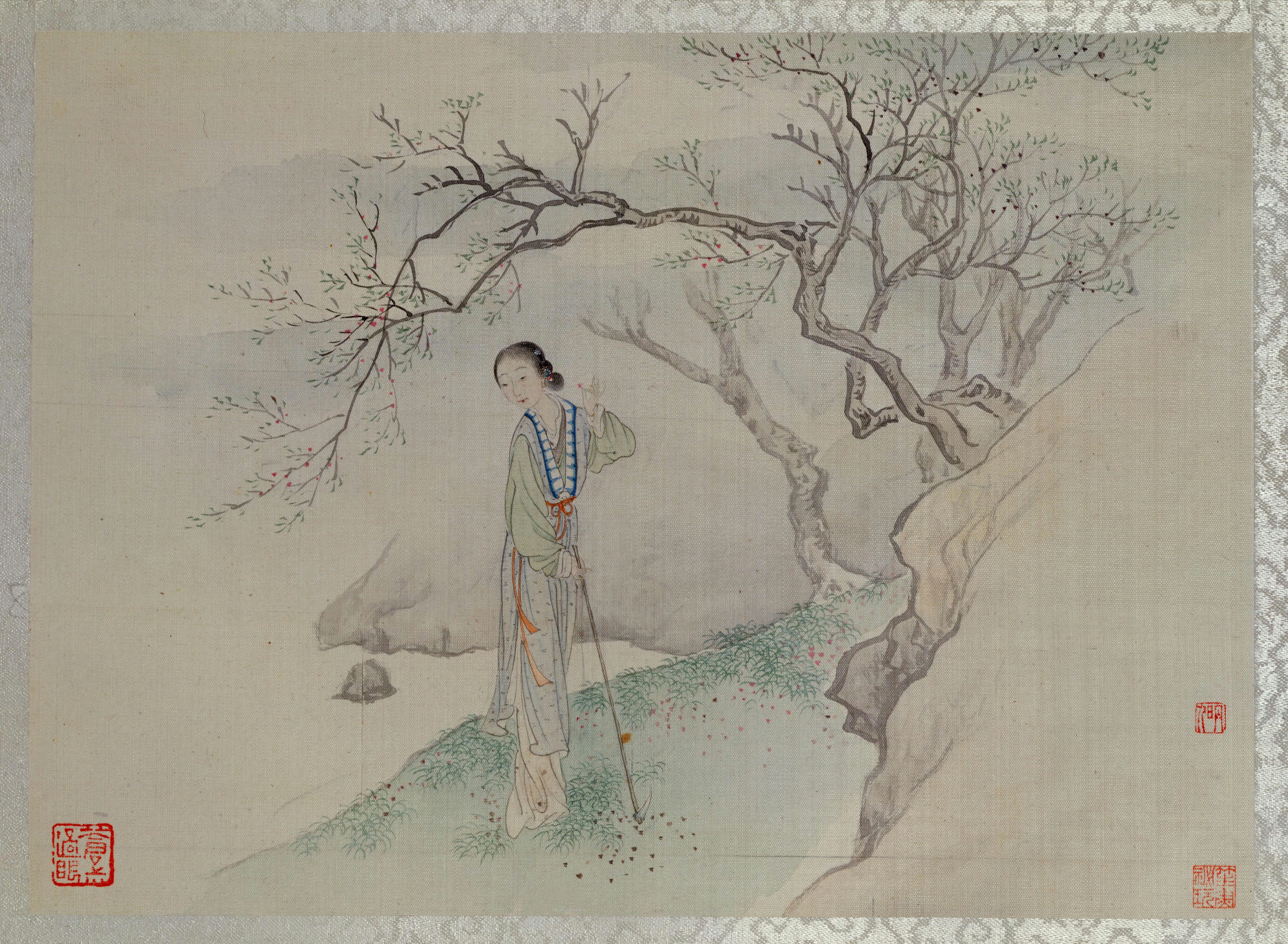

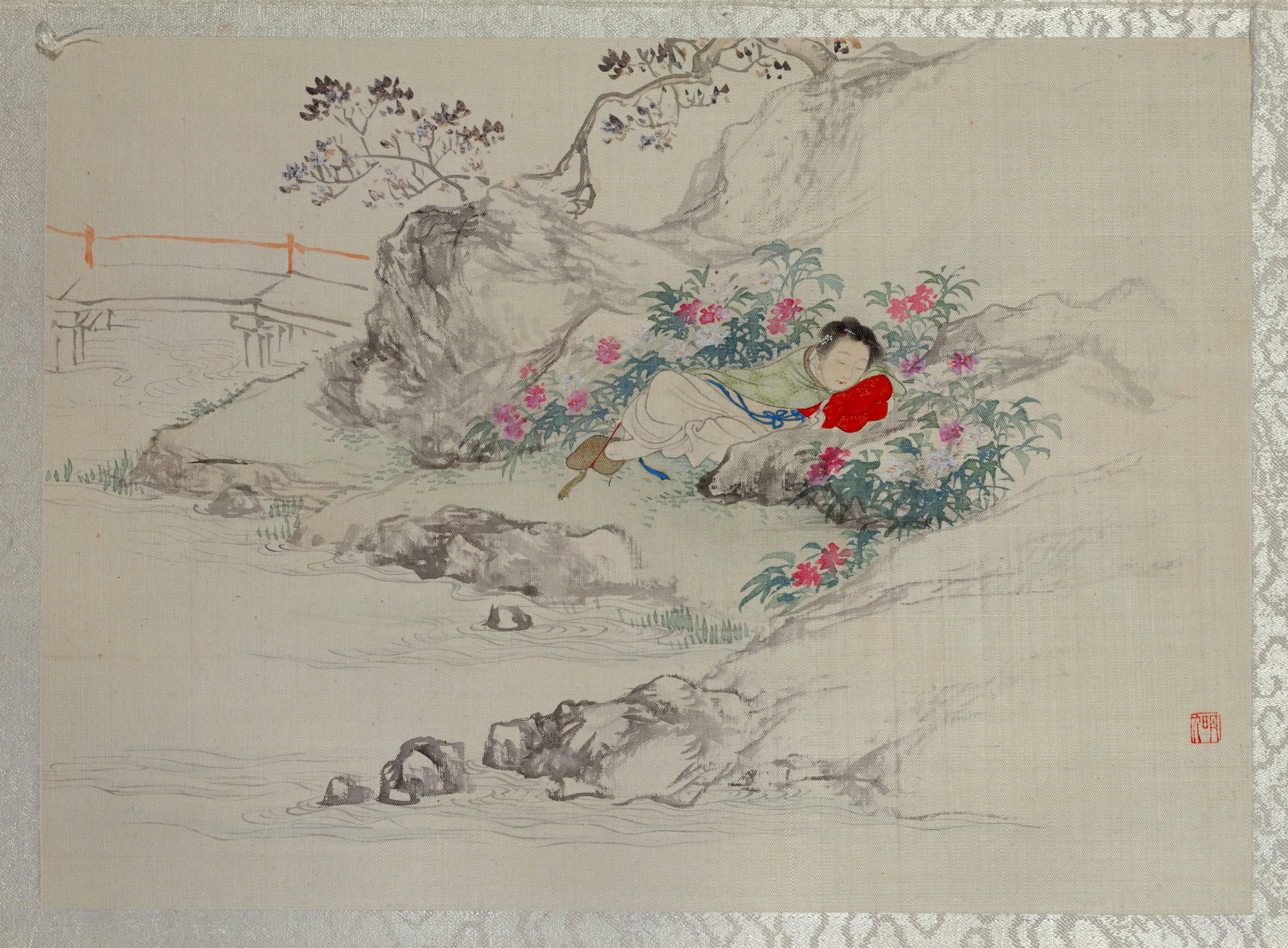

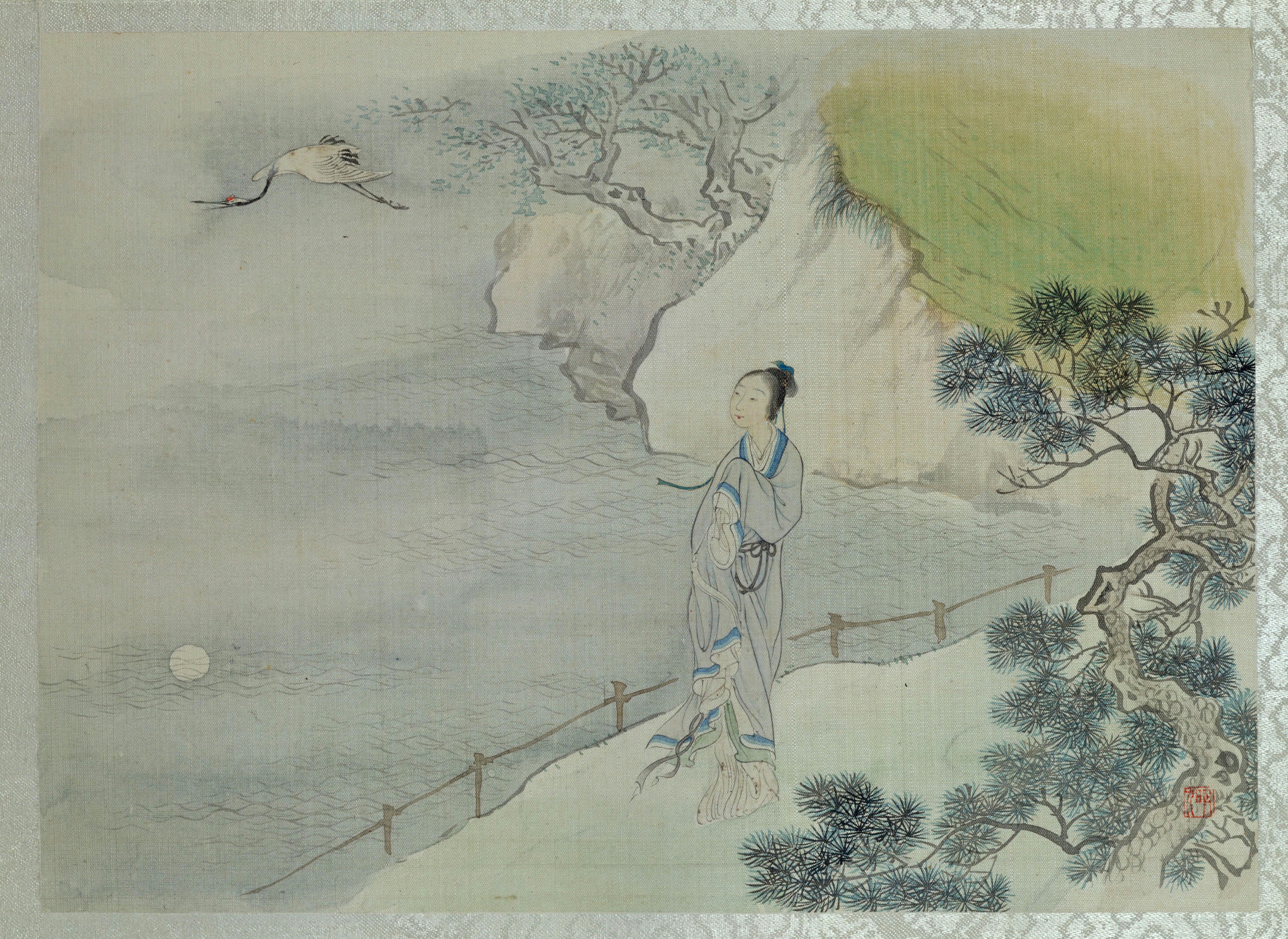

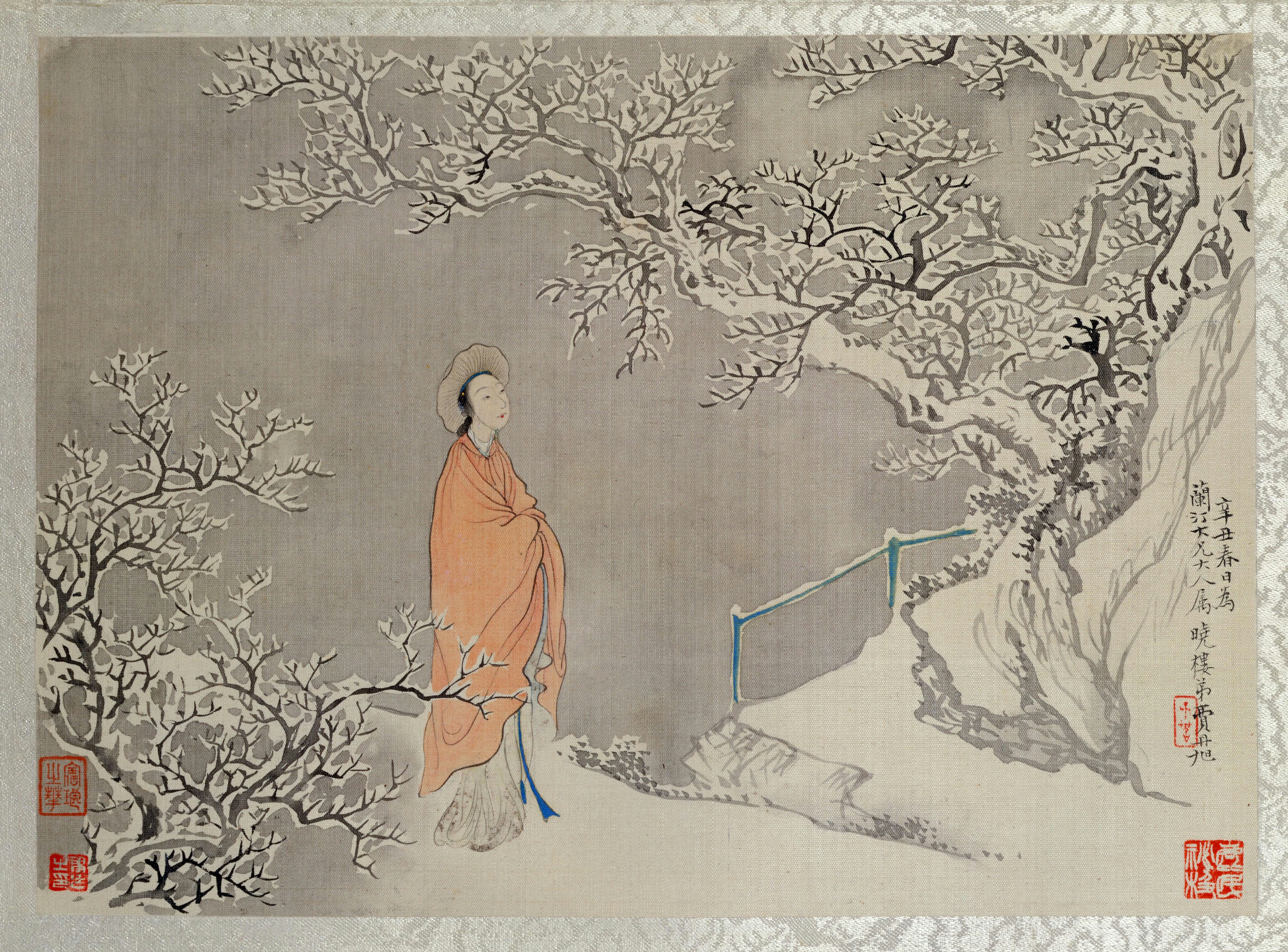

== Characters ==
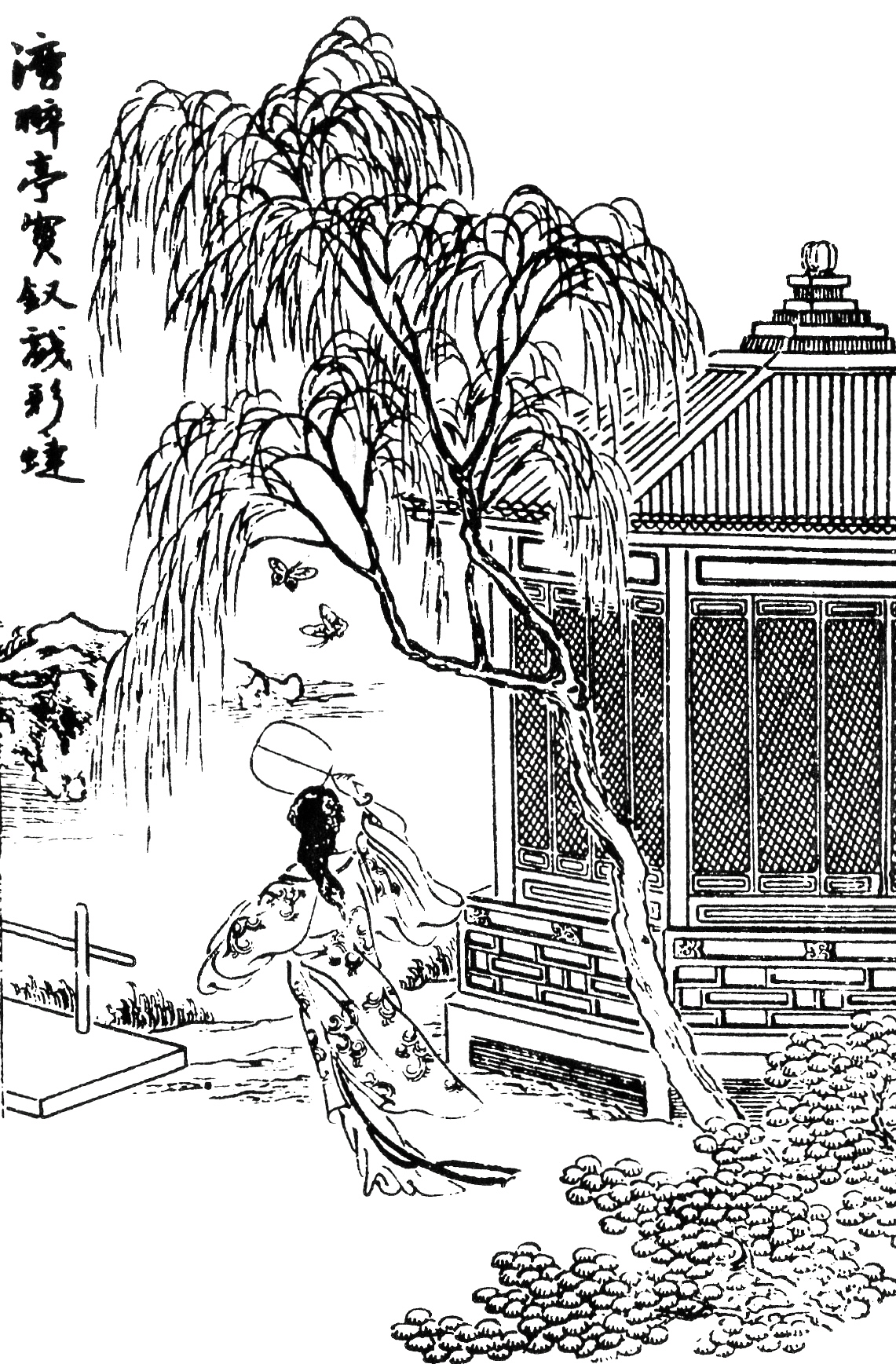
1889 woodcut print depicting Xue Baochai chasing butterflies (Chapter 27)

Dream of the Red Chamber contains an extraordinarily large number of characters: nearly 40 major characters, and over 400 additional ones. The novel is known for complex portraits of its female characters. According to Lu Xun in the appendix to A Brief History of Chinese Fiction, Dream of the Red Chamber broke every conceivable thought and technique in traditional Chinese fiction; its realistic characterization presents thoroughly human characters who are neither "wholly good nor wholly bad", but who seem to inhabit part of the real world.

The names of the characters in particular present a challenge to translators, since many of them convey meaning. David Hawkes left the names of the masters, mistresses, and their family members in pinyin (Jia Zheng and Lady Wang, for instance), translated the meanings of the servants' names, (such as Aroma and Skybright), put the names of the Daoists and Buddhists into Latin (Sapientia), and those of actors and actresses into French.

=== Jia Baoyu and the Twelve Beauties of Jinling ===
- Jia Baoyu (traditional Chinese: 賈寶玉; simplified Chinese: 贾宝玉; pinyin: Jiǎ Bǎoyù; Wade–Giles: Chia Pao-yu; lit. 'Precious Jade')
  The main protagonist is about 12 or 13 years old when introduced. The adolescent son of Jia Zheng and his wife, Lady Wang, and born with a piece of luminescent jade in his mouth (the Stone), Baoyu is the heir apparent to the Rongguo House. Frowned on by his strict Confucian father, Baoyu reads Zhuangzi and Romance of the Western Chamber on the sly rather than the Four Books of classic Chinese education. Baoyu is highly intelligent but dislikes the fawning bureaucrats who frequent his father's house. A sensitive and compassionate individual, he has a special relationship with many of the women in the house.
- Lin Daiyu (林黛玉; Lín Dàiyù; Lin Tai-yu; 'Blueblack Jade')
  Jia Baoyu's younger first cousin and his true love. She is the daughter of Lin Ruhai (林如海), an official in the lucrative Yangzhou salt commission, and Lady Jia Min (賈敏), Baoyu's paternal aunt. She is an icon of spirituality and intelligence: beautiful, sentimental, sarcastic, self-assured, an accomplished poet, but subject to fits of jealousy. She suffers from a respiratory ailment. In the frame story, Baoyu, in his previous incarnation as the Deity Shenying, watered the Fairy Crimson Pearl, Daiyu's incarnation. The purpose of her mortal reincarnation is to repay Baoyu with tears. The novel proper starts in Chapter 3 with Daiyu's arrival at the Rongguo House shortly after the death of her mother.
- Xue Baochai (薛寶釵; 薛宝钗; Xuē Bǎochāi; Hsueh Pao-chai; 'Precious Hairpin')
  Jia Baoyu's other first cousin. The only daughter of Aunt Xue (薛姨媽), sister to Baoyu's mother, Baochai is a foil to Daiyu. Where Daiyu is unconventional and sincere, Baochai is worldly-wise and very tactful: a model Chinese feudal maiden. The novel describes her as beautiful and ambitious. Baochai has a round face, fair skin, large eyes, and, some would say, a more voluptuous figure in contrast to Daiyu's slender willowy daintiness. Baochai carries a golden locket with her which contains words given to her in childhood by a Buddhist monk. Baochai's golden locket and Baoyu's jade contain inscriptions that appear to complement one another perfectly in the material world. Her marriage to Baoyu is seen in the book as predestined, but ultimately fails because Baoyu's love for Daiyu persists after her death.
- Wang Xifeng (王熙鳳; 王熙凤; Wáng Xīfèng; Wang Hsi-feng; 'Splendid Phoenix'), alias Sister Feng.
  Baoyu's elder cousin-in-law, young wife to Jia Lian (who is Baoyu's paternal first cousin), niece to Lady Wang. Xifeng is hence related to Baoyu both by blood and marriage. A handsome woman, Xifeng is capable, clever, humorous, and, at times, vicious and cruel. Undeniably the most worldly woman in the novel, Xifeng is in charge of the daily running of the Rongguo household and wields economic as well as political power within the family. Xifeng keeps both Lady Wang and Grandmother Jia entertained with her jokes and chatter. By playing the role of the perfect filial daughter-in-law, she rules the household with an iron fist. Xifeng can be kind-hearted toward the poor and helpless or cruel enough to kill. She makes a fortune by investing in loan sharking rather than maintaining the family estate and brings about the downfall of the family. She dies soon after the family assets are seized by the government.
- Shi Xiangyun (史湘雲; 史湘云; Shǐ Xiāngyún; Shih Hsiang-yun; 'Xiang River Clouds')
  Jia Baoyu's younger second cousin. Grandmother Jia's grandniece. Orphaned in infancy, she grows up under her wealthy paternal uncle and aunt who treats her unkindly. In spite of this Xiangyun is openhearted and cheerful. A comparatively androgynous beauty, Xiangyun looks good in men's clothes (once she put on Baoyu's clothes and Grandmother Jia thought she was a man), and loves to drink. She is forthright and without tact, but her forgiving nature takes the sting from her casually truthful remarks. She is well educated and as talented a poet as Daiyu or Baochai. Her young husband dies shortly after their marriage. She vows to be a faithful widow for the rest of her life.
- Jia Tanchun (賈探春; 贾探春; Jiǎ Tànchūn; Chia Tan-chun; 'Seeking Spring')
  Baoyu's younger half-sister by Concubine Zhao. Extremely outspoken, she is almost as capable as Wang Xifeng. Wang Xifeng herself compliments her privately, but laments that she was "born in the wrong womb", since concubine children are not respected as much as those by first wives. She is also a very talented poet. Tanchun is nicknamed "Rose" for her beauty and her prickly personality. She later marries into a military family on the South Sea far away from home.
- Jia Yuanchun (賈元春; 贾元春; Jiǎ Yuánchūn; Chia Yuan-chun; 'First Spring')
  Baoyu's elder sister by about a decade. Originally one of the ladies-in-waiting in the imperial palace, Yuanchun later becomes an Imperial Consort, having impressed the Emperor with her virtue and learning. Her illustrious position as a favorite of the Emperor marks the height of the Jia family's powers. Despite her prestigious position, Yuanchun feels imprisoned within the imperial palace, and dies at the age of forty. The name of four sisters together "Yuan-Ying-Tan-Xi" is a homophone with "Supposed to sigh".
- Jia Yingchun (賈迎春; 贾迎春; Jiǎ Yíngchūn; Chia Ying-chun; 'Welcoming Spring')
  Second female family member of the generation of the Jia household after Yuanchun, Yingchun is the daughter of Jia She, Baoyu's uncle and therefore his elder first cousin. A kind-hearted, weak-willed person, Yingchun is said to have a "wooden" personality and seems rather apathetic toward all worldly affairs. Although very pretty and well-read, she does not compare in intelligence and wit to any of her cousins. Yingchun's most famous trait, it seems, is her unwillingness to meddle in the affairs of her family. Eventually Yingchun marries an official of the imperial court, her marriage being merely one of her father's desperate attempts to raise the declining fortunes of the Jia family. The newly married Yingchun becomes a victim of domestic abuse and constant violence at the hands of her cruel, abusive husband.
- Miaoyu (妙玉; Miàoyù; Miao-yu; 'Wonderful/Clever Jade'; Hawkes/Minford translation: Adamantina)
  A young nun from Buddhist cloisters of the Rong-guo house. Although beautiful and learned, she is aloof, haughty, unsociable, and has an obsession with cleanliness. The novel says she was compelled by her illness to become a nun, and shelters herself under the nunnery to dodge political affairs. Her fate is not known after her abduction by bandits.
- Qin Keqing (秦可卿; Qín Kěqīng; Ch'in K'o-ching;a homophone with "look down upon love")
  Daughter-in-law to Jia Zhen. Of all the characters in the novel, the circumstances of her life and early death are amongst the most mysterious. Apparently a very beautiful and flirtatious woman, she carried on an affair with her father-in-law and dies before the second quarter of the novel. Her bedroom is bedecked with priceless artifacts belonging to extremely sensual women, both historical and mythological. In her bed, Bao Yu first travels to the Land of Illusion where he has a sexual encounter with Two-In-One, who represents Xue Baochai and Lin Daiyu. Two-in-One's name is also Keqing, making Qin Keqing also a significant character in Bao Yu's sexual experience. The original twelve songs hint that Qin Keqing hanged herself.
- Li Wan (李紈; 李纨; Lǐ Wán; Li Wan; 'White Silk')
  Baoyu's elder sister-in-law, widow of Baoyu's deceased elder brother, Jia Zhu (賈珠). Her primary task is to bring up her son Lan and watch over her female cousins. The novel portrays Li Wan, a young widow in her late twenties, as a mild-mannered woman with no wants or desires, the perfect Confucian ideal of a proper mourning widow. She eventually attains high social status due to the success of her son at the Imperial Exams, but the novel sees her as a tragic figure because she wasted her youth upholding the strict standards of behavior.
- Jia Xichun (賈惜春; 贾惜春; Jiǎ Xīchūn; Chia Hsi-chun; 'Treasuring Spring')
  Baoyu's younger cousin from the Ningguo House, but brought up in the Rongguo House. A gifted painter, she is also a devout Buddhist. She is the young sister of Jia Zhen, head of the Ningguo House. At the end of the novel, after the fall of the house of Jia, she gives up her worldly concerns and becomes a Buddhist nun. She is the second youngest of Jinling's Twelve Beauties, described as a pre-teen in most parts of the novel.
- Jia Qiaojie (賈巧姐; 贾巧姐; Jiǎ Qiǎojiě; Chia Chiao-chieh)
  Wang Xifeng's and Jia Lian's daughter. She is a child through much of the novel. After the fall of the house of Jia, in the version of Gao E and Cheng Weiyuan, she marries the son of a wealthy rural family introduced by Granny Liu and goes on to lead a happy, uneventful life in the countryside.

The Twelve Beauties of Jinling
Portraits of the main female characters of the novel Dream of the Red Chamber, as they are known as the Twelve Beauties of Jinling, by an anonymous artist of the Qing dynasty, collection of the Posner Center of Carnegie Mellon University.
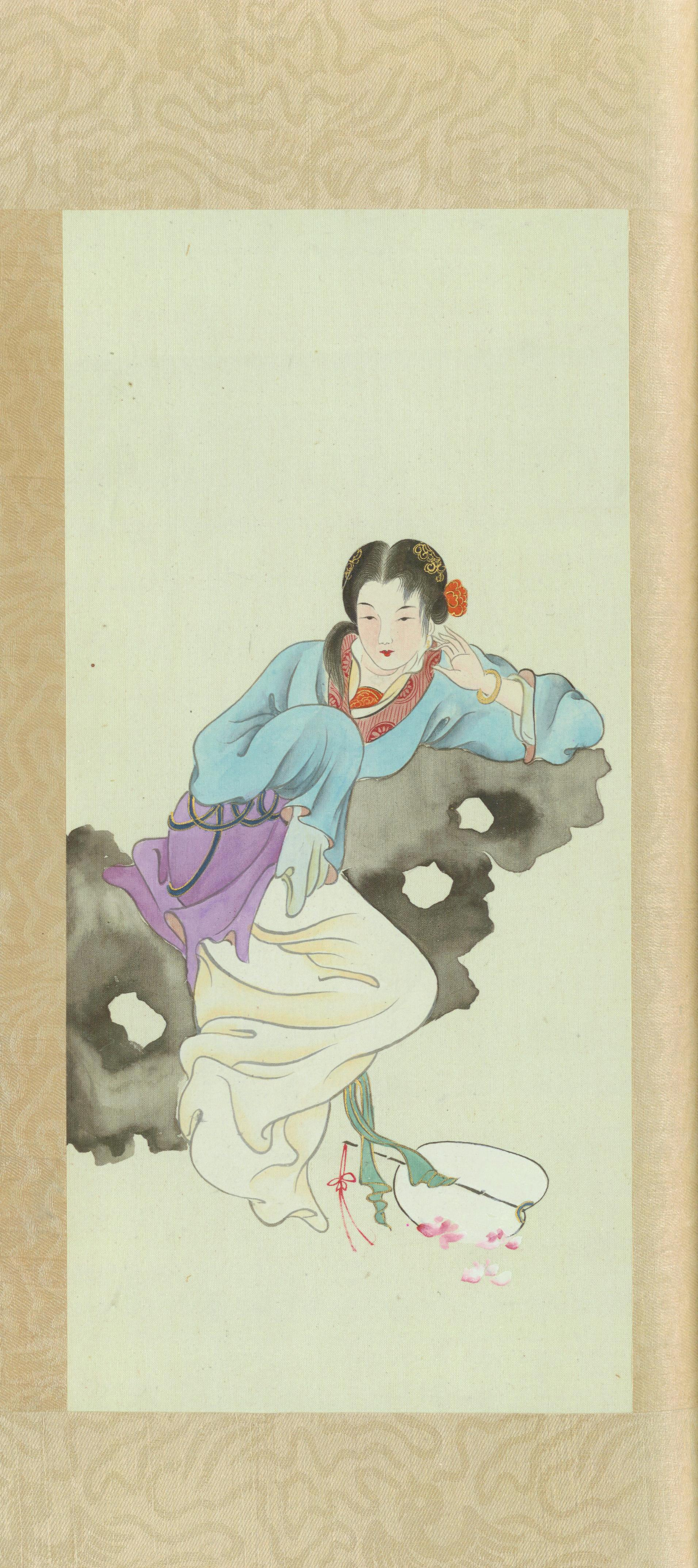

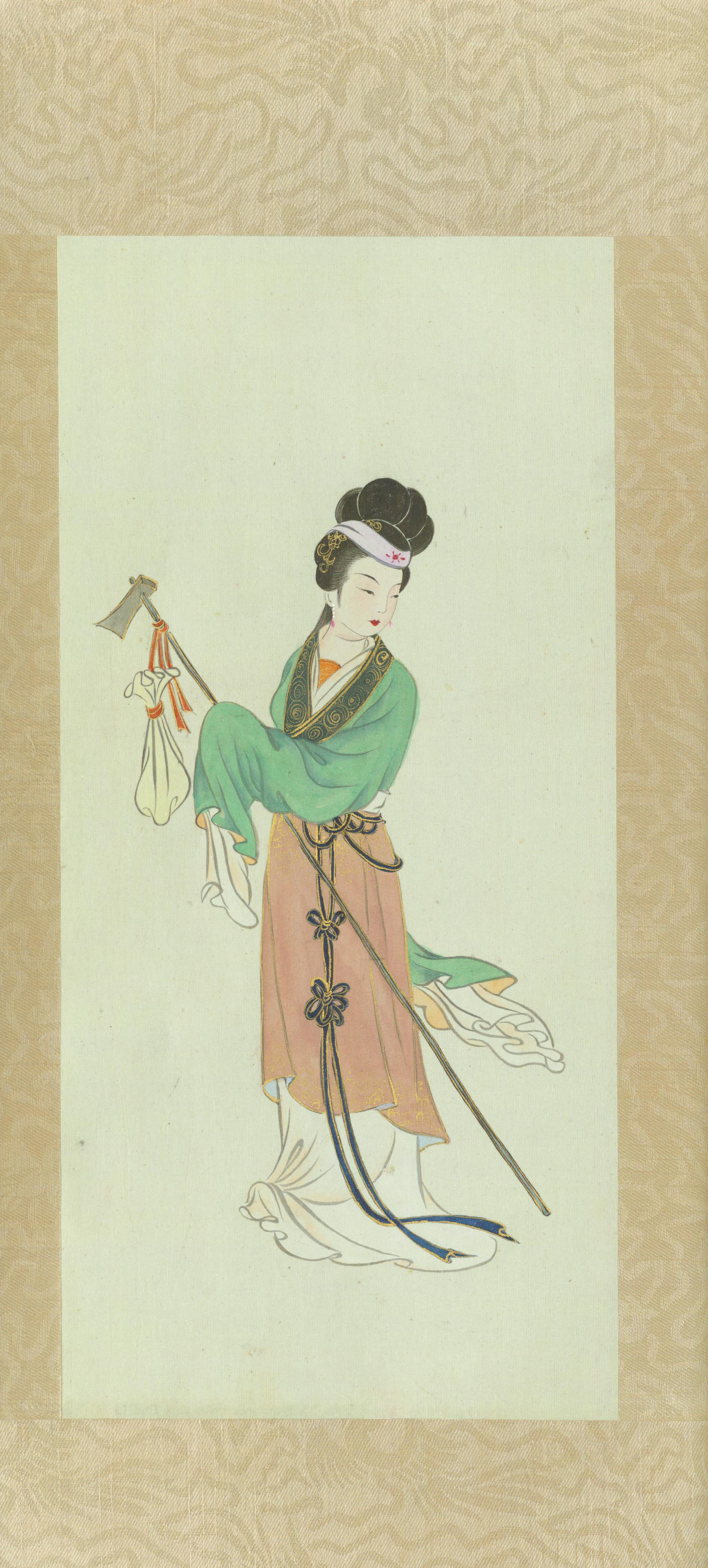

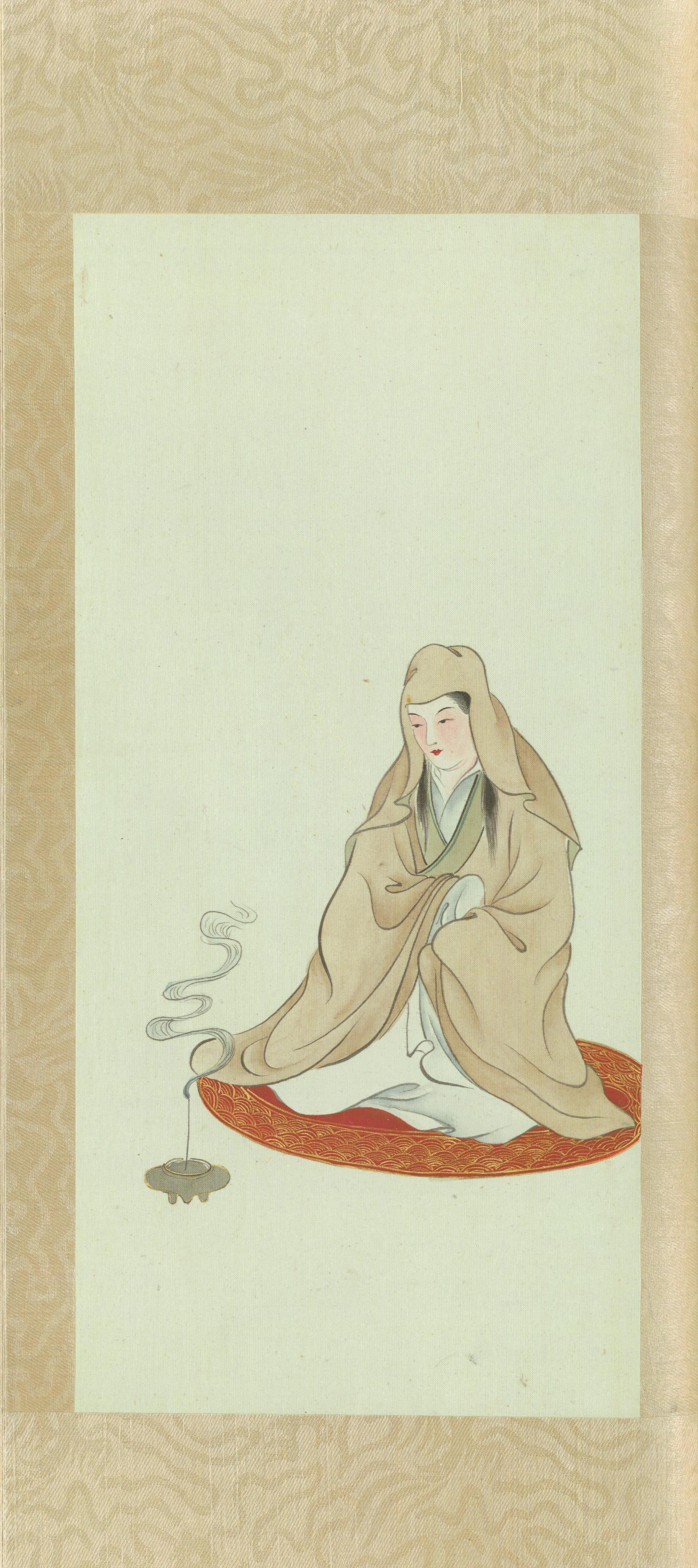

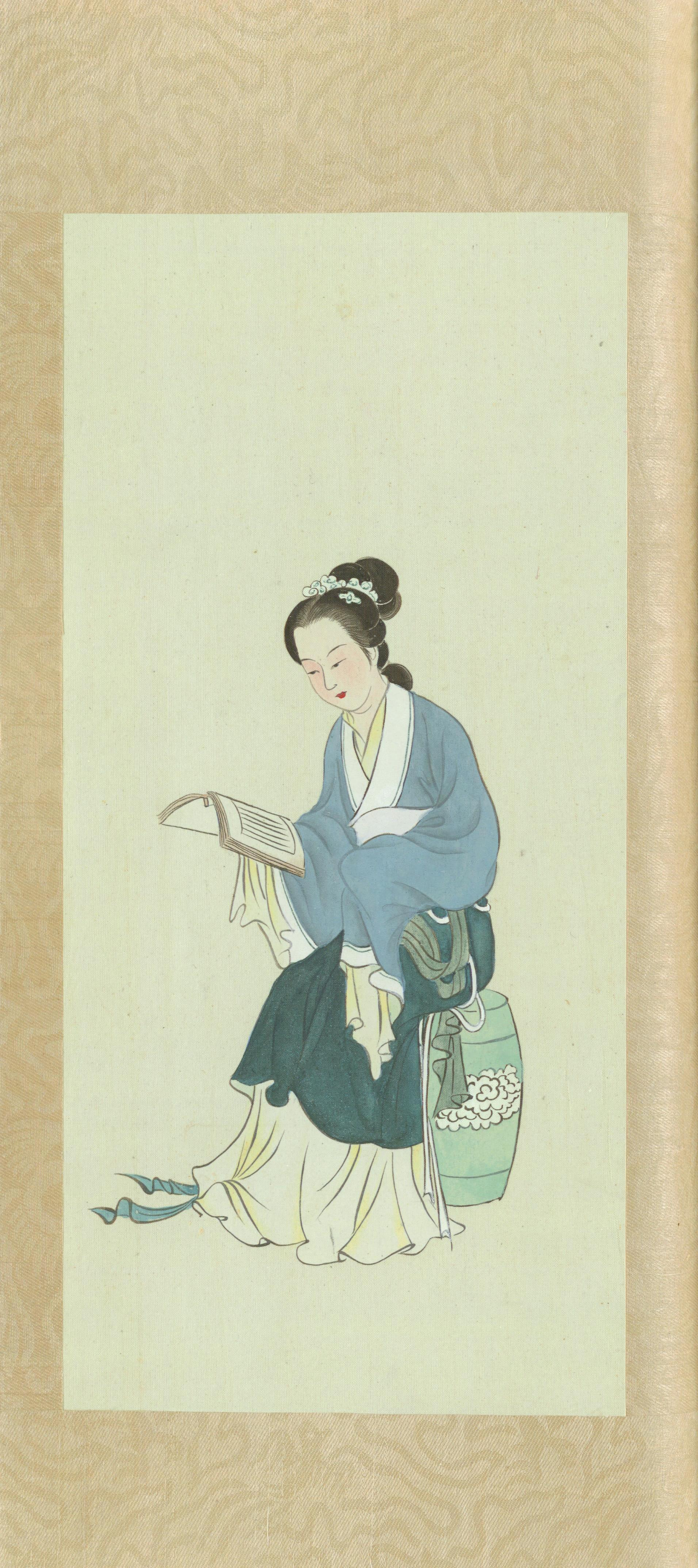

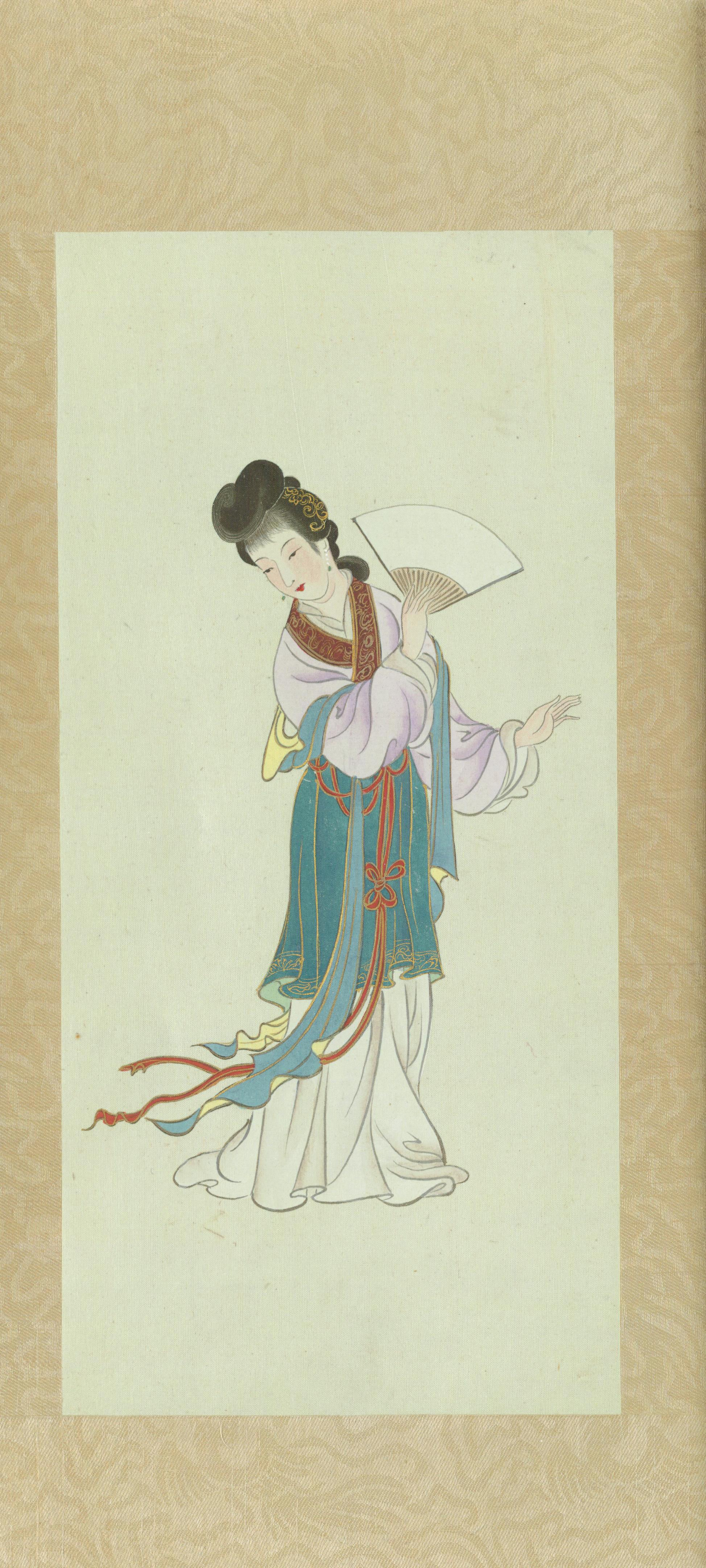

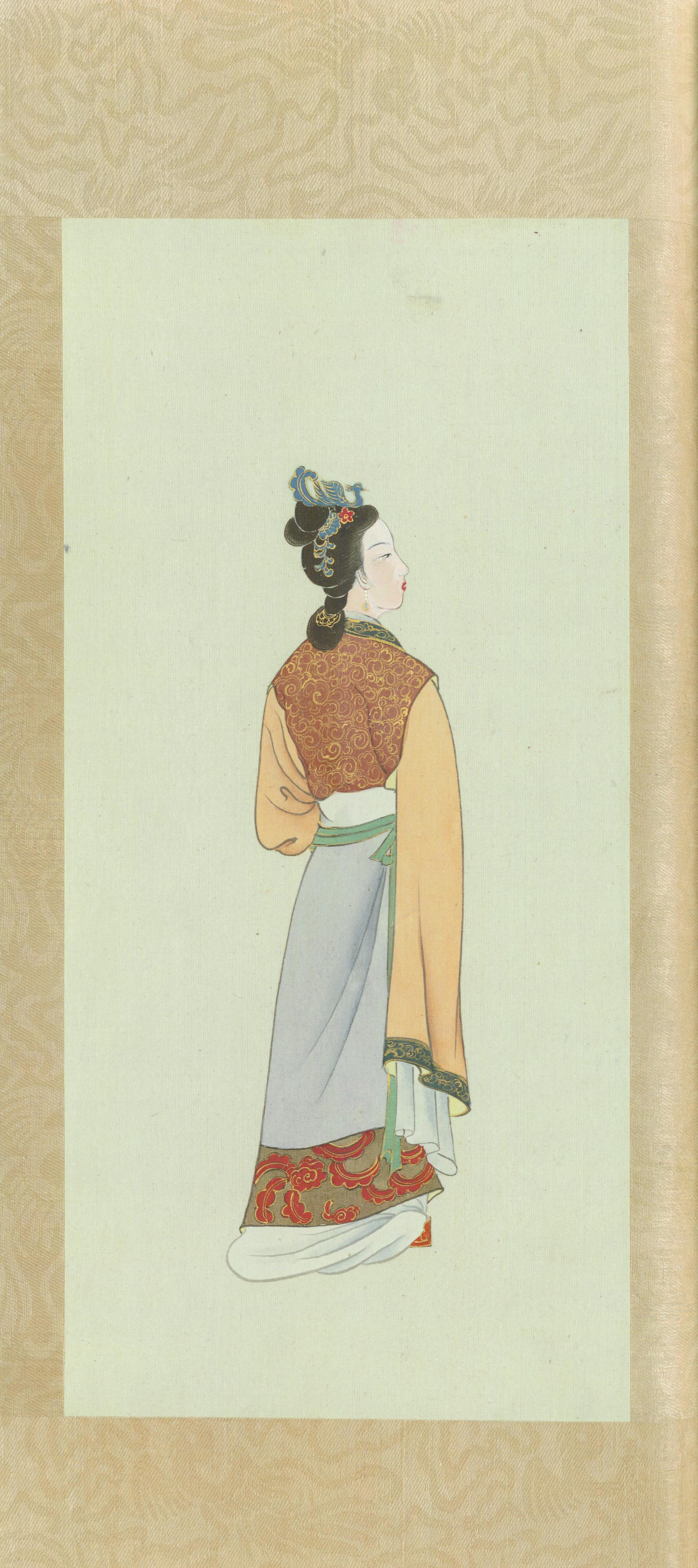

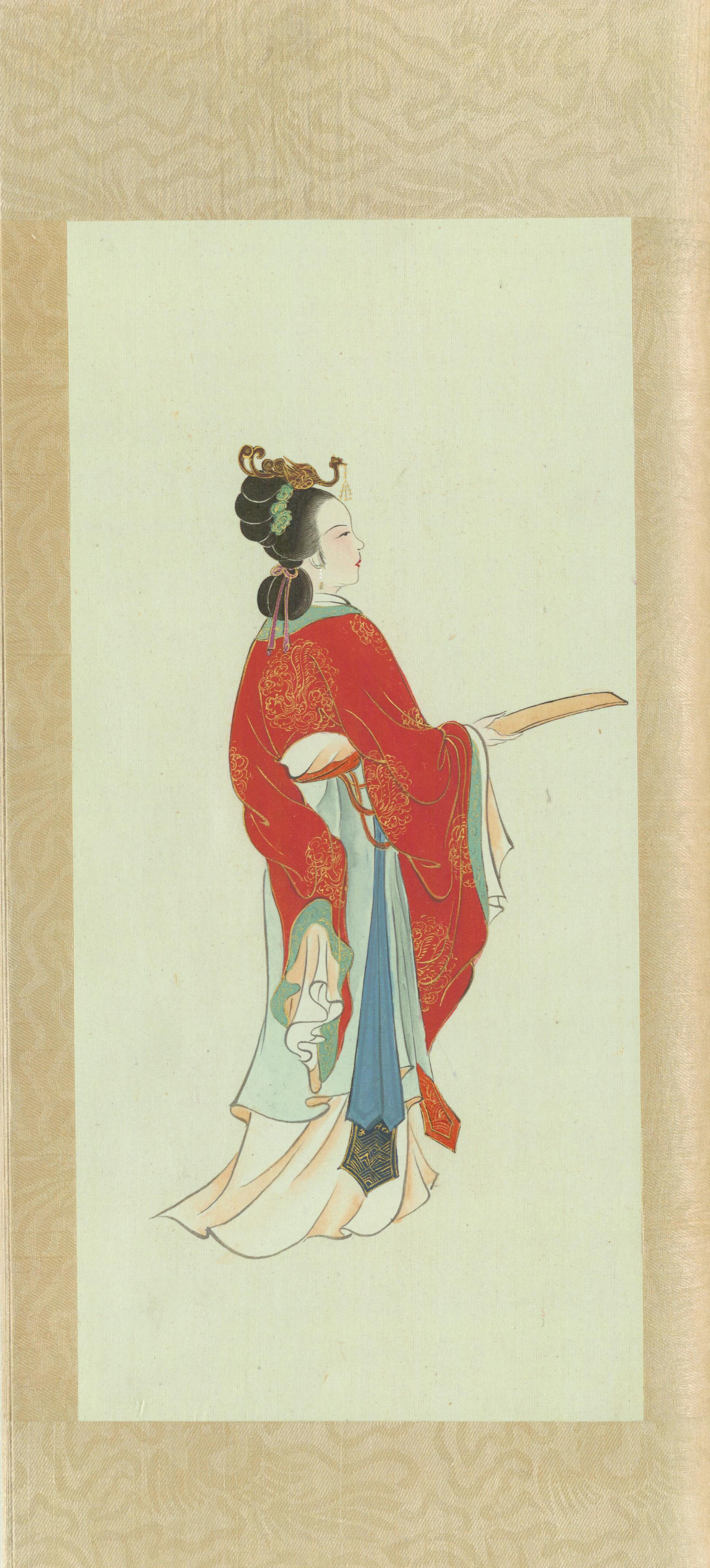

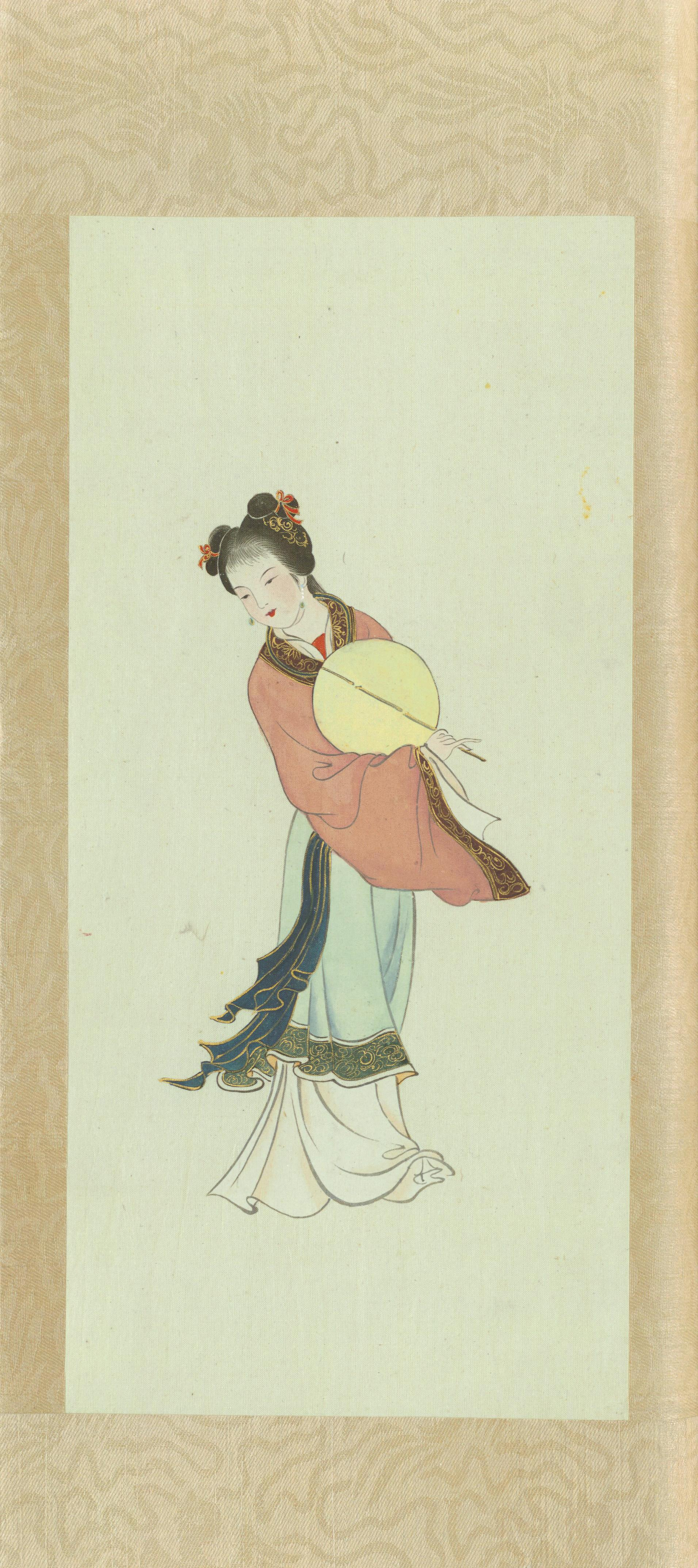

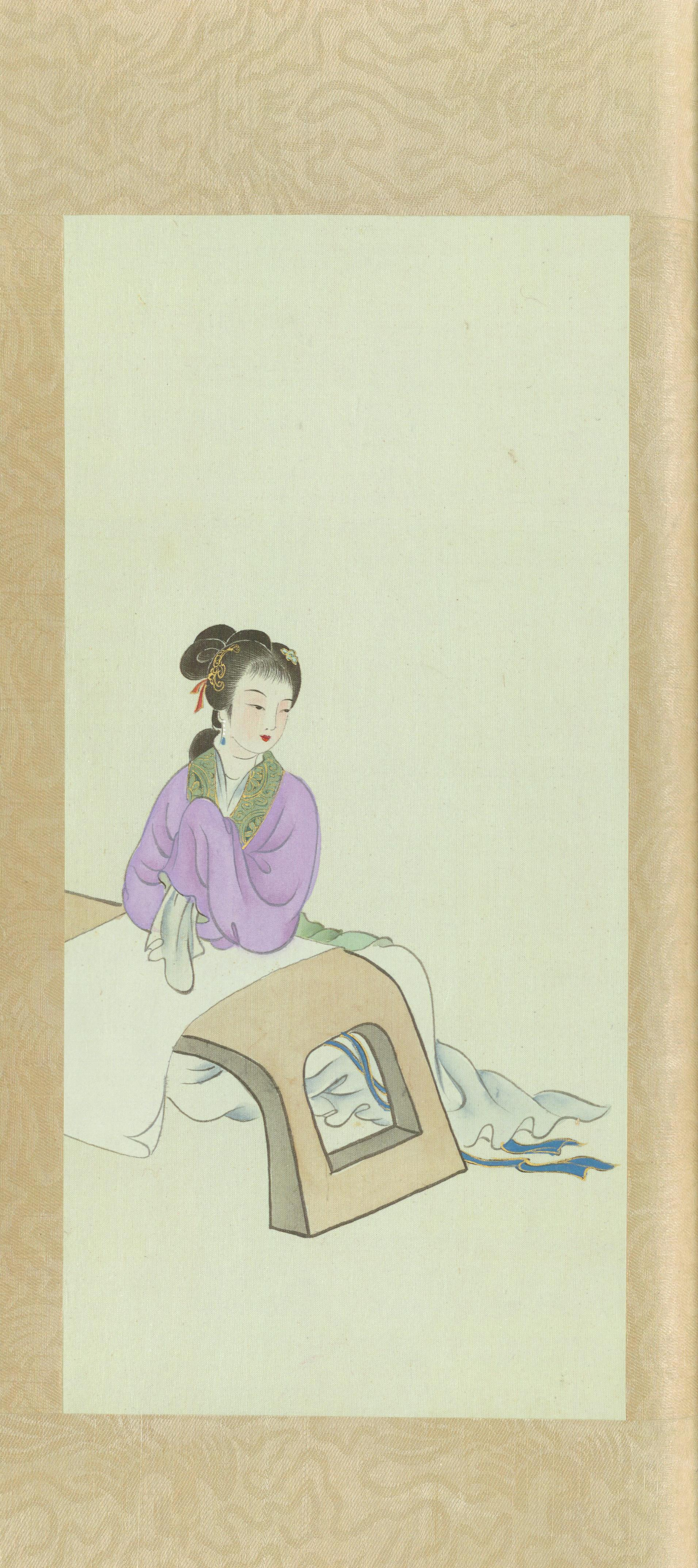

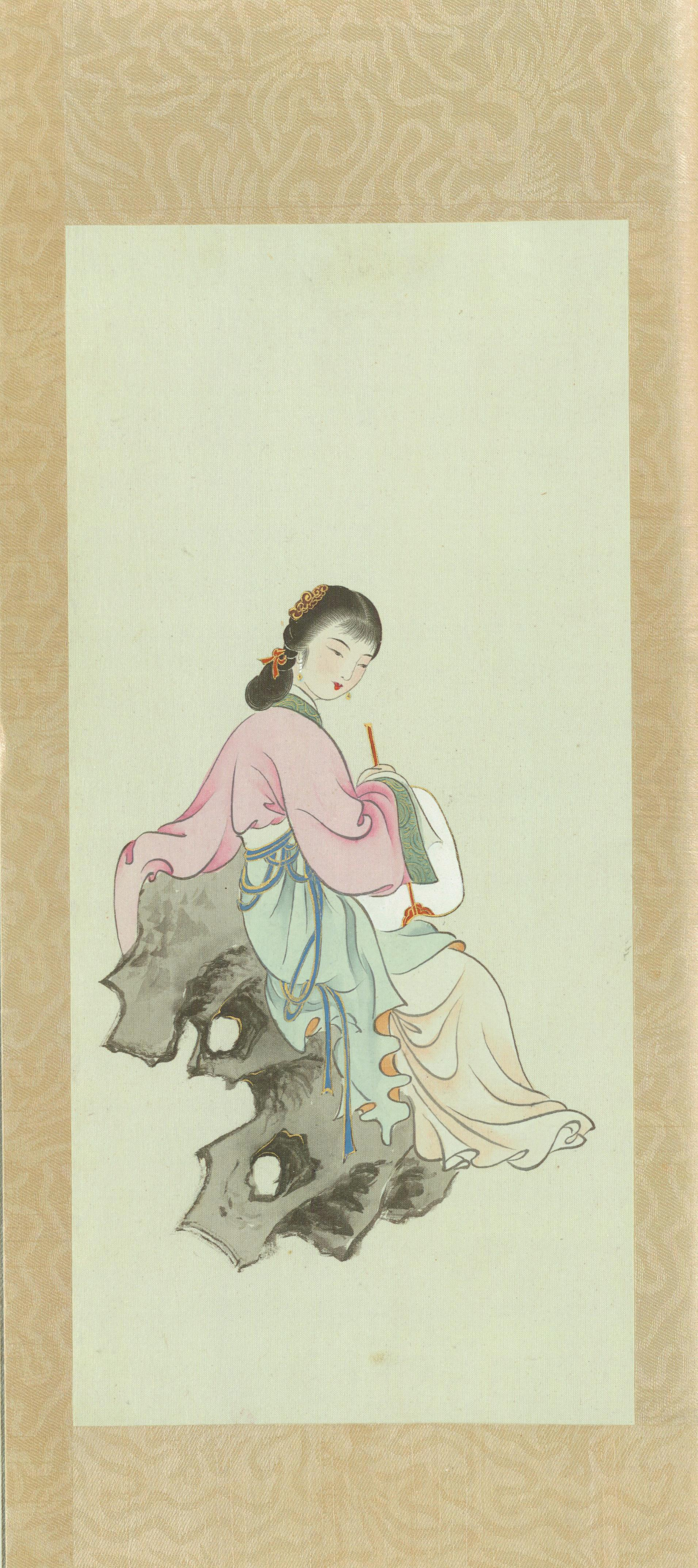

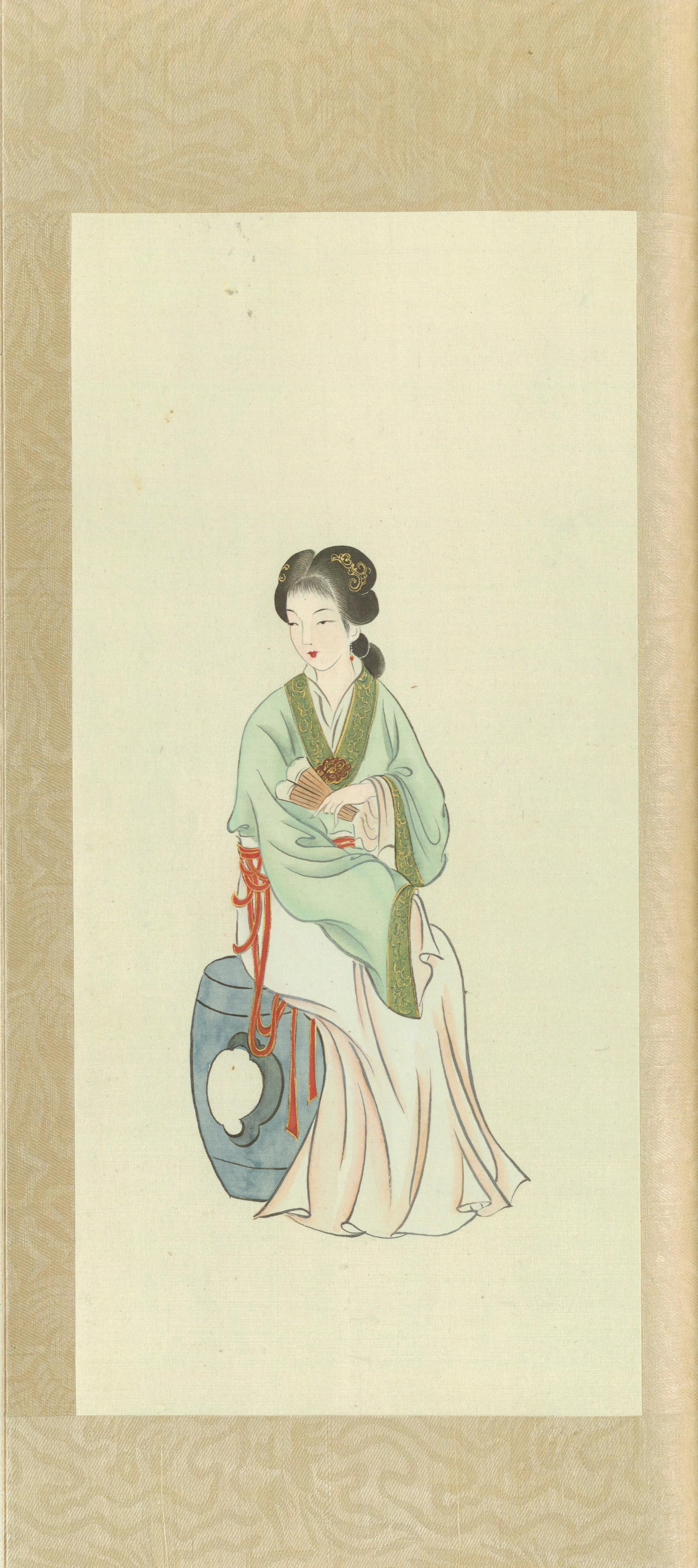

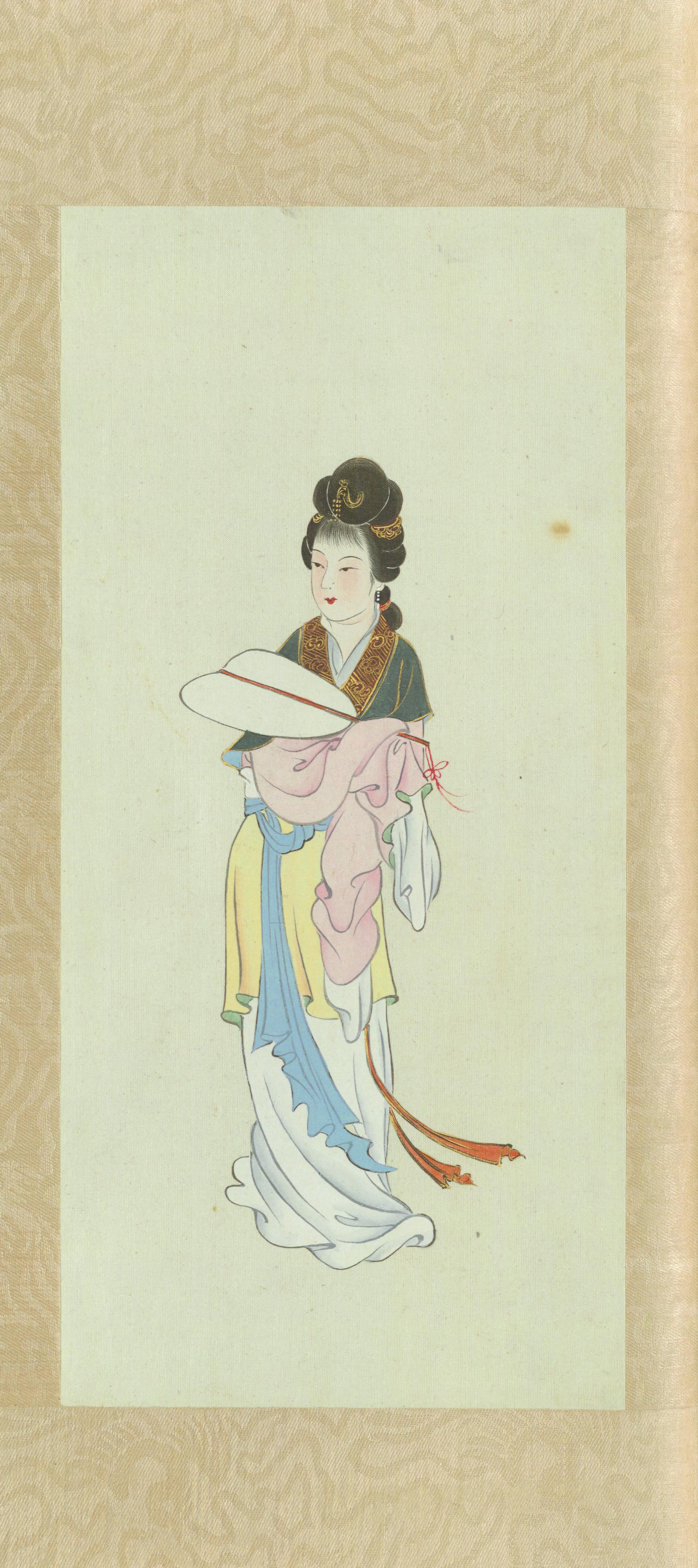

=== Other main characters ===
- Grandmother Jia (賈母; 贾母; Jiǎmǔ), née Shi.
  Also called the Matriarch or the Dowager, the daughter of Marquis Shi of Jinling. Grandmother to both Baoyu and Daiyu, she is the highest living authority in the Rongguo house and the oldest and most respected of the entire clan, yet also a doting person. She has two sons, Jia She and Jia Zheng, and a daughter, Min, Daiyu's mother. Daiyu is brought to the house of the Jias at the insistence of Grandmother Jia, and she helps Daiyu and Baoyu bond as childhood playmates and, later, kindred spirits. She distributes her savings among her relatives after the seizure of their properties by the government shortly before her death.
- Jia She (賈赦; 贾赦; Jiǎ Shè; Chia Sheh)
  The elder son of the Dowager. He is the father of Jia Lian and Jia Yingchun. He is a treacherous and greedy man, and a womanizer. He is jealous of his younger brother whom his mother favors. He is later stripped of his title and banished by the government.
- Jia Zheng (賈政; 贾政; Jiǎ Zhèng; Chia Cheng)
  Baoyu's father, the younger son of the Dowager. He is a disciplinarian and Confucian scholar. Afraid his one surviving heir will turn bad, he imposes strict rules on his son, and uses occasional corporal punishment. He has a wife, Lady Wang, and one concubine: Zhao. He is a Confucian scholar who tries to live life as an upright and decent person, but out of touch with reality and a hands-off person at home and in court.
- Jia Lian (賈璉; 贾琏; Jiǎ Liǎn; Chia Lien)
  Xifeng's husband and Baoyu's paternal elder cousin, a notorious womanizer whose numerous affairs cause much trouble with his jealous wife, including affairs with men that are not known by his wife. His pregnant concubine (Second Sister You) eventually dies by his wife's engineering. He and his wife are in charge of most hiring and monetary allocation decisions, and often fight over this power. He is a cad with a flawed character but still has a conscience.
- Xiangling (香菱; Xiāng Líng; 'Fragrant Water caltrop'; Hawkes/Minford translation: Caltrop) – the Xues' maid, born Zhen Yinglian (甄英蓮, a homophone with "deserving pity"), the kidnapped and lost daughter of Zhen Shiyin (甄士隱, a homophone with "Hiding the truth"), the country gentleman in Chapter 1. Her name is changed to Qiuling (秋菱) by Xue Pan's spoiled wife, Xia Jingui (夏金桂) who is jealous of her and tries to poison her. Xue Pan makes her the lady of the house after Jingui's death. She soon dies while giving birth.
- Ping'er (平兒; 'Peace'; Hawkes/Minford translation: Patience)
  Xifeng's chief maid and personal confidante; also concubine to Xifeng's husband, Jia Lian. Originally Xifeng's maid in the Wang household, she follows Xifeng as part of her dowry when Xifeng marries into the Jia household. She handles her troubles with grace, assists Xifeng capably and appears to have the respect of most of the household servants. She is also one of the very few people who can get close to Xifeng. She wields considerable power in the house as Xifeng's most trusted assistant, but uses her power sparingly and justly. She is supremely loyal to her mistress, but more soft-hearted and sweet-tempered.
- Xue Pan (薛蟠; Xuē Pán; Hsueh Pan; 'to Coil (as a dragon)')
  Baochai's older brother, a dissolute, idle rake who was a local bully in Jinling. He was known for his amorous exploits with both men and women. Not particularly well educated, he once killed a man over a servant-girl (Xiangling) and had the manslaughter case hushed up with money.
- Granny Liu (劉姥姥; 刘姥姥; Liú Lǎolao)
  A country rustic and distant relation to the Wang family, who provides a comic contrast to the ladies of the Rongguo House during two visits. She eventually rescues Qiaojie from her maternal uncle, who wanted to sell her.
- Lady Wang (王夫人; Wáng Fūren)
  A Buddhist, primary wife of Jia Zheng. Daughter of one of the four most prominent families of Jinling. Because of her purported ill-health, she hands over the running of the household to her niece, Xifeng, as soon as the latter marries into the Jia household, although she retains overall control over Xifeng's affairs so that the latter always has to report to her. Although Lady Wang appears to be a kind mistress and a doting mother, she can in fact be cruel and ruthless when her authority is challenged. She pays a great deal of attention to Baoyu's maids to make sure that Baoyu does not develop romantic relationships with them.
- Aunt Xue (薛姨媽; 薛姨妈; Xuē Yímā), née Wang
  Baoyu's maternal aunt, mother to Pan and Baochai, sister to Lady Wang. She is kindly and affable for the most part, but finds it hard to control her unruly son.
- Hua Xiren (花襲人; 花袭人; Huā Xírén; 'Flower Assails Men'; Hawkes/Minford translation: Aroma)
  Baoyu's principal maid and his unofficial concubine. While she still has standing as the Dowager's maid, the Dowager gave her to Baoyu so, in practice, Xiren is his maid. Considerate and forever worried about Baoyu, she is the partner of his first adolescent sexual encounter in the real world in Chapter 5. After Baoyu's disappearance, she unknowingly marries actor Jiang Yuhan, one of Baoyu's friends.

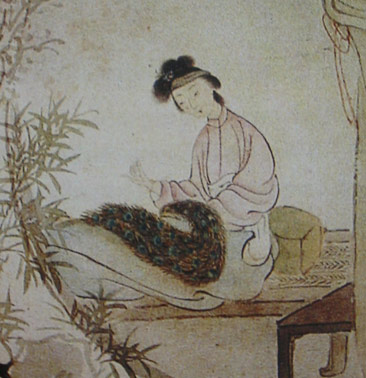
Qingwen, painted by Xu Baozhuan

- Qingwen (晴雯; Qíngwén; 'Sunny Multicolored Clouds'; Hawkes/Minford translation: Skybright)
  Baoyu's personal maid. Brash, haughty and the most beautiful maid in the household, Qingwen is said to resemble Daiyu very strongly. Of all of Baoyu's maids, she is the only one who dares to argue with Baoyu when reprimanded, but is also extremely devoted to him. She is disdainful of Xiren's attempt to use her sexual relation with Baoyu to raise her status in the family. Lady Wang later suspected her of having an affair with Baoyu and publicly dismisses her on that account; angry at the unfair treatment and of the indignities and slanders that attended her as a result, Qingwen dies of an illness shortly after leaving the Jia household.
- Yuanyang (鴛鴦; 鸳鸯; Yuānyang; 'Pair of Mandarin Ducks'; Hawkes/Minford translation: Faithful)
  The Dowager's chief maid. She rejects a marriage proposal (as concubine) to the lecherous Jia She, Grandmother Jia's eldest son, and commits suicide right after the Dowager's death.
- Mingyan (茗煙; 茗烟; Míngyān; 'Tea Vapor'; Hawkes/Minford translation: Tealeaf)
  Baoyu's page boy. Knows his master like the back of his hand.
- Zijuan (紫鵑; 紫鹃; Zǐjuān; Tzu-chuan; 'Purple Rhododendron or Cuckoo'; Hawkes/Minford translation: Nightingale)
  Daiyu's faithful maid, ceded by the Dowager to her granddaughter. She later becomes a nun to serve Jia Xichun.
- Xueyan (雪雁; Xuěyàn; Hawkes/Minford translation: Snowgoose)
  Daiyu's other maid. She came with Daiyu from Yangzhou, and comes across as a young, sweet girl. She is asked to accompany the veiled bride Baochai to trick Baoyu into believing that he is marrying Daiyu.
- Concubine Zhao (趙姨娘; 赵姨娘; Zhào Yíniáng)
  A concubine of Jia Zheng. She is the mother of Jia Tanchun and Jia Huan, Baoyu's half-siblings. She longs to be the mother of the head of the household, which she does not achieve. She plots to murder Baoyu and Xifeng with black magic, and it is believed that her plot cost her own life.

=== Notable minor characters ===
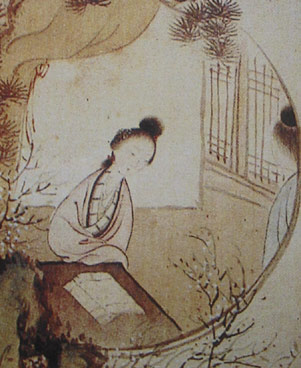
A scene from the story, painted by Xu Baozhuan

- Qin Zhong (秦鐘, a homophone with "great lover") – His elder sister is Qin Keqing, Baoyu's nephew's wife, and so he is technically a generation younger than Baoyu. Both he and Qin Keqing are the adopted children of Qin Ye(秦業). The two boys enroll in the Jia clan's school together and he becomes Baoyu's best friend. The novel leaves open the possibility that things might have gone beyond innocent friendship. Qin Zhong and the novice Zhineng (智能, "Intelligent"; "Sapientia" in the Hawkes translation) fall in love but Qin Zhong dies soon after from a combination of his father's severe beating, sexual exhaustion, grief and remorse. One commentator writes that Qin Zhong is a pun for qingzhong (passion incarnate), and that his sister Qinshi initiates Baoyu into heterosexual relations in his dream and Qin Zhong initiates him into homosexual ones.
- Jia Yucun (賈雨村) — The childhood tutor of Lin Daiyu. Originally a poor scholar, he became a prefect with the help of Zhen Shiyin before being fired for corruption. He later connected himself with his distant relatives in the Jia family through the Lin family and was reinstated as prefect.
- Jia Lan (賈蘭) – Son of Baoyu's deceased older brother Jia Zhu and his virtuous wife Li Wan. Jia Lan is an appealing child throughout the book and at the end succeeds in the imperial examinations to the credit of the family.
- Jia Zhen (賈珍) – Head of the Ningguo House, the elder branch of the Jia family. He has a wife, Lady You, a younger sister, Jia Xichun, and many concubines. He is extremely greedy and the unofficial head of the clan, since his father has retired. He has an adulterous affair with his daughter-in-law, Qin Keqing.
- Lady You (尤氏) – Wife of Jia Zhen. She is the sole mistress of the Ningguo House.
- Jia Rong (賈蓉) – Jia Zhen's son. He is the husband of Qin Keqing. An exact copy of his father, he is the Cavalier of the Imperial Guards.
- Xue Baoqin (薛寶琴) – The paternal cousin of Xue Baochai. Depicted as extremely beautiful and talented. Grandmother Jia originally sought to betroth her to Jia Baoyu.
- Second Sister You (尤二姐) – Jia Lian takes her in secret as his lover. Though a kept woman before she was married, after her wedding she becomes a faithful and doting wife. Because of Wang Xifeng's intrigue, she finally kills herself by swallowing a large piece of gold.
- Liu Xianglian (柳湘蓮) – A descendant of the Liu family and an amateur actor. A bold man, he is good friends with Jia Baoyu and forms a brotherhood with Xue Pan.
- Lady Xing (邢夫人) – Jia She's wife. She is Jia Lian's stepmother.
- Xing Xiuyan (邢岫烟) – The niece of Lady Xing. She is intelligent and courteous, but is a modest beauty due to her and her family's financial struggles.
- Jia Huan (賈環) – Son of Concubine Zhao. He and his mother are both reviled by the family, and he carries himself like a kicked dog. He shows his malignant nature by spilling candle wax, intending to blind his half-brother Baoyu.
- Sheyue (麝月; Hawkes/Minford translation: Musk) — Baoyu's main maid after Xiren and Qingwen. She is beautiful and caring, a perfect complement to Xiren.
- Qiutong (秋桐) — Jia Lian's other concubine. Originally a maid of Jia She, she is given to Jia Lian as a concubine. She is a very proud and arrogant woman.
- Sister Sha (傻大姐) – A maid who does rough work for the Dowager. She is guileless but amusing and caring. In the Gao E and Cheng Weiyuan version, she unintentionally informs Daiyu of Baoyu's secret marriage plans.

== Themes ==
Honglou meng is a book about enlightenment [or awakening]. ... A man in his life experiences several decades of winter and summer. The most sagacious and wise is certainly not submerged in considerations of loss and gain. However, the experiences of prosperity and decline, coming together and dispersing [of family members and friends] are too common; how can his mind be like wood and stone, without being moved by all this? In the beginning there is a profusion of intimate feelings, which is followed by tears and lamentations. Finally, there is a time when one feels that everything he does is futile. At this moment, how can he not be enlightened?

— A commentary on the novel by writer Jiang Shunyi, dated 1869

The opening chapter of the novel describes a great stone archway and on either side a couplet is inscribed:

假作真時真亦假，
無為有處有還無。

Truth becomes fiction when the fiction's true;
Real becomes not-real where the unreal's real.

This couplet is later reiterated, however this time as:

假去真來真勝假，
無原有是有非無。

When Fiction departs and Truth appears, Truth prevails;
Though Not-real was once Real, the Real is never unreal.

As one critic points out, the couplet signifies "not a hard and fast division between truth and falsity, reality and illusion, but the impossibility of making such distinctions in any world, fictional or actual." It also symbolizes the peculiar Taoist religious tradition prevalent in Northern China since the Yuan dynasty as practiced in Cao's time, as well as Taoism's alternate roles in society such as doctrines for philosophical and intellectual rather than religious guidance and one of the schools of thought Buddhist sects in China syncretized with their own. This theme is further reflected in the name of the main family, Jia (賈, pronounced jiǎ), which is a homophone with the character jiǎ 假, meaning false or fictitious; this is mirrored by the surname of the other main family, Zhen (甄, pronounced zhēn), a homophone for the word "real" (真). It is suggested that the novel is both a realistic reflection and a fictional or "dream" version of Cao's own family.

Early Chinese critics identified its two major themes as those of the nature of love, and of the transitoriness of earthly material values, as outlined in Buddhist and Taoist philosophies. Later scholars echoed the philosophical aspects of love and its transcendent power as depicted in the novel. One remarked that the novel is a remarkable example of the "dialectic of dream and reality, art and life, passion and enlightenment, nostalgia and knowledge."

The novel also vividly depicts Chinese material culture, such as medicine, cuisine, tea culture, festivities, proverbs, mythology, Confucianism, Buddhism, Taoism, filial piety, opera, music, architecture, funeral rites, painting, classic literature and the Four Books. Among these, the novel is particularly notable for its grand use of poetry.

Since the establishment of Cao Xueqin as the novel's author, its autobiographical aspects have come to the fore. Cao Xueqin's clan was similarly raided in real life, and suffered a steep decline. Marxist interpretation starting in the New Culture Movement saw the novel as exposing feudal society's corruption and emphasized the clashes between the classes. Since the 1980s, critics have embraced the novel's richness and aesthetics in a more multicultural context.

In the title Hóng lóu Mèng (紅樓夢, literally "Red Chamber Dream"), "red chamber" can refer to the sheltered chambers where the daughters of a prominent family reside. It also refers to Baoyu's dream in Chapter five, set in a "red chamber", a dream where the fates of many of the characters are foreshadowed. "Mansion" is one of the definitions of the Chinese character "樓" (lóu), but the scholar Zhou Ruchang writes that in the phrase hónglóu it is more accurately translated as "chamber".

The novel's mythological elements were also inspired by the services Cao was involved in at the Dongyue Temple. The temple's most venerated gods came from Daoism, Chinese Buddhism, Tibetan Buddhism and shamanic traditions from various regions within and outside of China, and the book's spiritual themes, prose stylization, and portrayals of mythical figures were inspired by the traditional stories told about these deities and other oral temple traditions from Beijing. Much of this folklore was already popular during the Yuan dynasty and was retold in various ways in Cao's era in the Qing dynasty.

=== Feminist interpretations ===
Dream of the Red Chamber played a significant role in assisting modern researchers in studying the gender issues of feudal Chinese society. The metaphor of gender is mainly reflected in the portrayal of characters and the construction of the environment. Regarding the setting of the environment, some critics interpret that the novel constructs two symbolic gendered spaces: one is the "Prospect Garden", which is related to women and matriarchy; the other is the patriarchal world dominated by men.

Cao Xueqin's portrayal of female characters broke through the mainstream norms of the patriarchal society in the Qing dynasty, emphasizing their spiritual qualities and independent personalities. For instance, the detailed depiction of Lin Daiyu's emotions and the description of Wang Xifeng's bold and capable nature both reflect the concern for the multifaceted nature of women. Even Jia Baoyu expressed in the text the view that "the essence of human nature is concentrated in women, while men are merely the dross", and this stance can be regarded as a direct challenge to the gender paradigm in the social environment of that time. As some scholars have summarized, Dream of the Red Chamber can be regarded as an early case of proposing gender equality in the context of its era. By presenting characters with both "feminine" and "masculine" traits, it demonstrates the equal status of men and women in terms of spirit and emotion.

The literary talent, especially in poetry, is depicted as a disruptive gender reversal in Dream of the Red Chamber. Traditional society often emphasizes the notion that "a woman without talent is virtuous", but in Cao Xueqin's works, the poetic talents are almost exclusively concentrated among the female characters. The women in the Jiaoguan Garden, through poetry associations, not only demonstrated talents surpassing those of men, but also used writing as a way to confirm their self-worth and dignity. In contrast, the protagonist of the novel, Jia Baoyu, was only "barely qualified". Scholars such as Angelina Yee pointed out that this reversal made the creativity of women the source of subjectivity and was consolidated through the form of a literary community. At the same time, the novel symbolically equates "women's tears" with "the author's ink", suggesting that Cao Xueqin himself completed the process of self-expression and self-redemption through writing.

Jia Baoyu embodies the tension between masculinity and femininity. His character has been described as an example of where male characters in the text are endowed with some traditional female traits, creating a literary form of gender duality. This implies the negotiation between Confucian prescriptions of rigid gender norms and alternative Daoist yin–yang models of balance, which are mutually dependent and interpenetrate each other, providing a philosophical foundation for the ambiguity and transformation of gender. Baoyu frequently demonstrates behaviors coded as not traditionally masculine, such as his knowledge of cosmetics, his willingness to do domestic chores, and even eating rouge. Some scholars state that female companions reprimand him for these eccentricities, symbolizing what call "a symbolic explosion of gender boundaries", while others resist seeing Baoyu's traits as 'gender crossing' and instead emphasize cultural or aesthetic symbolism. Many Western scholars have also researched the ambiguity of Baoyu. Edwards compared this contradiction with the Western feminist theory of the French language, particularly the "metaphorical duality" concept proposed by Cixous and Kristeva, which suggests that the subject should simultaneously incorporate the traits of both men and women to break through the binary framework of patriarchy. In this contrast, Baoyu not only embodies the fluidity of yin and yang complementarity but is also suppressed by the Confucian system as an "uncompleted man", thus forming an ambiguous and complex gender identity.

In contrast, Wang Xifeng represents another mode of gender crossing, who is described as unusually forceful for a woman, often compared to men in her decisiveness and ambition. Scholars argue that Xifeng perceived appropriate gender distinctions by simultaneously subverting and supporting the Confucian order. Critics have also associated her with social disorder, as "gender confusion is symbolic of larger disorder: it is the blurring of distinctions that make social order possible". Her portrayal has been interpreted as reflecting anxieties about women who step outside traditional roles, which reveal tensions in Qing society about the limits of female authority. Therefore, Xifeng's strength and agency challenge male-dominated hierarchies, complicating her role in the book as merely a disruptive figure.

The representation of gender in Dream of the Red Chamber shows the contradictions of Qing society's gender norms. As Ma mentioned, the topic of gender in Dream of the Red Chamber reflects the historical context during the Qing dynasty. The blending of male and female genders in the novel undoubtedly represents the support of women's rights within the feudal society, as well as the vanguard role in advocating for women's rights amidst the restrictions on freedom of speech. It also inspires contemporary society to advocate for women's rights, which have promoted gender equality and encouraged women to shape their own destinies through strength and determination.

== Reception and influence in modern era ==
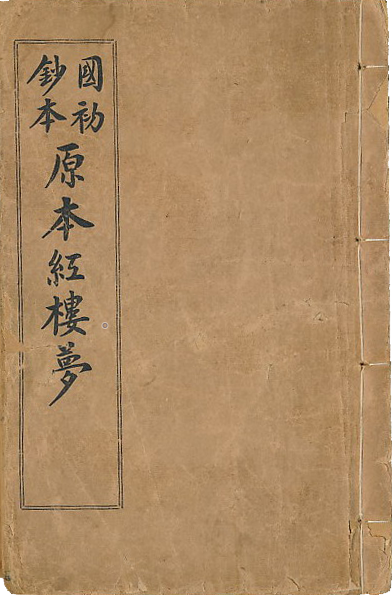
The cover of a 1912 printed edition of the Youzheng version

In the late 19th century, Hong Lou Meng's influence was so pervasive that the reformer Liang Qichao attacked it along with another classic novel, Water Margin, as "incitement to robbery and lust", and for smothering the introduction of Western style novels, which he regarded as more socially responsible. The eminent scholar Wang Guowei, however, achieved a new method of literary interpretation in an innovative and path-breaking 1904 essay which invoked the philosophy of Arthur Schopenhauer. Wang called the novel "the tragedy of tragedies", in contrast to the prosperous endings in most earlier drama and fiction. Wang further proclaims the novel as "worthy of being considered as the one great masterpiece in the realm of Chinese art."

In the early 20th century, although the New Culture Movement took a critical view of the Confucian classics, the scholar Hu Shih used the tools of textual criticism to put the novel in an entirely different light, as a foundation for national culture. Hu and his students, Gu Jiegang and Yu Pingbo, first established that Cao Xueqin was the work's author. Taking the question of authorship seriously reflected a new respect for fiction, since the lesser forms of literature had not been traditionally ascribed to particular individuals. Hu next built on Cai Yuanpei's investigations of the printing history of the early editions to prepare reliable reading texts. The final, and in some respects most important task, was to study the vocabulary and usage of Cao's Beijing dialect as a basis for Modern Mandarin.

In the 1920s, scholars and devoted readers developed Hongxue, or Redology into both a scholarly field and a popular avocation. Among the avid readers was the young Mao Zedong, who later claimed to have read the novel five times and praised it as one of China's greatest works of literature. The influence of the novel's themes and style are evident in many modern Chinese prose works. The early 1950s was a rich period for Redology with publication of major studies by Yu Pingbo. Zhou Ruchang, who as a young scholar had come to the attention of Hu Shih in the late 1940s, published his first study in 1953, which became a best seller. But in 1954 Mao personally criticized Yu Pingbo for his "bourgeois idealism" in failing to emphasize that the novel exposed the decadence of "feudal" society and the theme of class struggle. In the Hundred Flowers Campaign, Yu came under heavy criticism but the attacks were so extensive and full of quotations from his work that they spread Yu's ideas to many people who would not otherwise have known of their existence.

During the Cultural Revolution, the novel initially came under fire, though it quickly regained its prestige in the following years. Zhou Ruchang resumed his lifework, eventually publishing more than sixty biographical and critical studies. In 2006, Zhou, who had long distrusted Gao E's editions, and the novelist Liu Xinwu, author of popular studies of the novel, joined to produce a new 80 chapter version which Zhou had edited to eliminate the Cheng-Gao emendations. Liu completed an ending that was supposedly more true to Cao's original intent. The novel continues to be influential on contemporary Chinese poets such as Middle Generation's An Qi, who paid homage to it in her poem To Cao Xueqin.

== Translations and reception in the West ==
... one of the great monuments of the world's literature ...

— Review of the Dream of the Red Chamber by Anthony West, The New Yorker

Cao utilizes many levels of colloquial and literary language and incorporates forms of classic poetry that are integral to the novel, making it a major challenge to translate. A 2014 study of fourteen translations of the novel concluded that the work is a "challenge even to the most resourceful of translators, and the process of rendering it into another language is bound to involve more translation problems, techniques, and principles than the process of rendering any other literary work." Accordingly, the aims and achievements of the translators differ widely.

The first recorded translation into English was in 1812 by the Protestant missionary and sinologist Robert Morrison (1782–1834), who translated part of Chapter 4 for the second volume of his unpublished 1812 book Horae Sinicae. In 1816, Morrison did publish a translation of a conversation from Chapter 31 in his Chinese language textbook Dialogues and Detached Sentences in the Chinese Language. In 1819, the British diplomat and sinologist John Francis Davis (1795–1890) published a short excerpt in the London Journal Quarterly Review. Davis also published a poem from Chapter 3 in the 1830 Transactions of the Royal Asiatic Society. In 1842, Karl Gützlaff's article, "Hung Lau Mung, or Dreams in the Red Chamber", in the sixth volume of the "Chinese Repository", included translation and criticism of some passages.

A literal translation of selected passages was published for foreigners learning Chinese by the Presbyterian Mission Press of Ningbo in 1846. Edward Charles Bowra of the Chinese Imperial Maritime Customs published a translation of the first eight chapters in 1868 and H. Bencraft Joly of the first fifty-six chapters in 1892. Alfred Lister in an 1873 review, wrote that the novel is "a work of art ... yet at a great disadvantage on account of its bulk. Its tremendous length, no less than twenty volumes; the vast number of persons involved in the story; and the complicatedly mysterious character of the introductory chapters, make it a book which perhaps the most heroic efforts of enthusiastic scholars will never succeed in introducing to the world of Western letters." The Reverend E.J. Eitel reviewed Joly's translation and condemned the novel, saying that Chinese read it "because of its wickedness." Herbert Giles, whom John Minford called "one of the more free-thinking British consular officers," took a more favorable view in a twenty-five page synopsis in 1885 that Minford calls still a "useful guide." Giles further highlighted it in his A History of Chinese Literature in 1901.

In 1928, Elfrida Hudson published a short introduction to the novel titled "An old, old story". An abridged translation by Wang Chi-Chen which emphasized the central love story was published in 1929, with a preface by Arthur Waley. Waley said that "we feel most clearly the symbolic or universal value" of the characters in the passages which recount dreams. "Pao Yu", Waley continued, stands for "imagination and poetry" and his father for "all those sordid powers of pedantry and restriction which hamper the artist". In a 1930 review of Wang's translation, Harry Clemons of The Virginia Quarterly Review wrote "This is a great novel", and along with the Romance of the Three Kingdoms, it "ranks foremost" among the novels of classic Chinese literature. Although Clemons felt "meaning was only fragmentarily revealed" in the English translated prose and that "many of the incidents" and "much of the poetry" were omitted, he nevertheless thought "at any rate the effort to read The Dream of the Red Chamber is eminently worth making." In 1958 Wang published an expansion on his earlier abridgement, though it was still truncated at 60 chapters.

The stream of translations and literary studies in the West grew steadily, building on Chinese language scholarship. The 1932 German translation by Franz Kuhn was the basis of an abridged version, The Dream of the Red Chamber, by Florence and Isabel McHugh published in 1958, and a later French version. Critic Anthony West wrote in The New Yorker in 1958 that the novel is to the Chinese "very much what The Brothers Karamazov is to Russian and Remembrance of Things Past is to French literature" and "it is beyond question one of the great novels of all literature." Kenneth Rexroth in a 1958 review of the McHugh translation, describes the novel as among the "greatest works of prose fiction in all the history of literature", for it is "profoundly humane". Bramwell Seaton Bonsall finished what is probably the first complete 120 chapter translation in the 1950s, Red Chamber Dream, but publication was abandoned when Penguin announced the Hawkes project. A typescript is available on the web.

The respected and prolific Yang Hsien-yi was commissioned to translate the first complete English version. Though he confessed that this was his least favorite of the classic novels, Yang began work in 1961 and had finished roughly 100 chapters in 1964, when he was ordered to stop. He and his wife, Gladys Yang, were imprisoned on suspicion of espionage during the Cultural Revolution, but they finished the translation as a team after their release in 1974. It was published by Beijing Foreign Language Press as A Dream of Red Mansions, in three volumes, 1978–1980. The second complete English translation to be published was by David Hawkes some century and a half after the first English translation. Hawkes was already a recognised redologist and had previously translated Chu Ci when Penguin Classics approached him in 1970 to make a translation which could appeal to English readers. After resigning from his professorial position, Hawkes published the first eighty chapters in three volumes (1973, 1977, 1980). The Story of the Stone (1973–1980), the first eighty chapters translated by Hawkes and last forty by his son-in-law John Minford consists of five volumes and 2,339 pages of actual core text (not including Prefaces, Introductions and Appendices) and over 2,800 pages in total. The word count of the Penguin Classics English translation is estimated at 845,000 words. In a 1980 review of the Hawkes and Minford translation in The New York Review of Books, Frederic Wakeman, Jr. described the novel as a "masterpiece" and the work of a "literary genius". Cynthia L. Chennault of the University of Florida stated that "The Dream is acclaimed as one of the most psychologically penetrating novels of world literature." The novel and its author have been described as among the most significant works of literature and literary figures of the past millennium.

The sinologist Oldřich Král also undertook a Czech translation of the entire novel, Sen v červeném domě (Prague: Odeon, three volumes, 1986–1988). Slovak sinologist and philosopher Marina Čarnogurská translated into Slovak whole four volumes of the novel, Sen o Červenom pavilóne (Bratislava: Petrus, 2001–2003. ISBN 80-88939-25-9).

In 2014, an abridged English translation by writer Lin Yutang, about half the length of the original, was discovered in a Japanese library. Long believed nonexistent, Lin’s translation was not a literal rendering. He adopted an adaptive approach, incorporating interpretive explanations within the prose and using few footnotes. In June 1973, Lin printed six copies of the manuscript and sent them to publishers in the United States, the United Kingdom, and Italy, among others, seeking publication. His efforts failed amid the Fourth Arab–Israeli War, which triggered the oil crisis and a worldwide paper shortage. The contacted publishers declined, citing the shortage, the manuscript’s length, and the existence of three earlier English versions. In November that year, Lin sent one copy to Japanese translator Ryoichi Sato, hoping to arrange a publication in Japan based on his English version. A few months later, Lin mailed Sato a revised manuscript that omitted Chapters 42–64 and the epilogue. In early 1988, Sato and his wife donated the revised manuscript, along with most of their Lin-related materials, to the Lin Yutang House in Taipei, but the revised manuscript was subsequently lost. Sato later published a four-volume Japanese edition in 1983 credited as “Edited by Lin Yutang, Translated by Ryoichi Sato,” followed by a single-volume edition in 1992. He eventually donated his collection, including Lin’s English manuscript, to the Hachinohe City Library in Aomori Prefecture, where it was rediscovered in 2015 by Song Dan, a Nankai University PhD candidate researching Japanese translations of Dream of the Red Chamber while on exchange at Waseda University. Lin’s estate, which holds the copyright, declined publication of his English translation despite considerable interest from multiple publishers, stating that the version kept in Japan was not Lin’s final draft and that its publication might misrepresent his work.

In a study of fourteen translations into English, German, French, Spanish, Laurence K. P. Wong finds that some challenges to translation are "surmountable", some "insurmountable," though translators sometimes hit on "surprisingly happy versions that come very close to the original," Hawkes, however, normally came up with versions that are "accurate, ingenious, and delightful". Hawkes recreates the meanings and sounds of the original with "remarkable precision, achieving much greater success than any one of his fellow translators in surmounting the limits of literary translation". Another scholar agreed that the Yang's translation is "literal" in the sense of rendering word for word, but argued that the Hawkes translation achieved what should be called a "higher level of literalness: in the sense of "text for text." That is, Hawkes tries to maintain the range and contrasting levels of usage of the original while the Yangs smooth out the language with a "plain international English" and add explanations in footnotes.

Other scholars examined particular aspects of the Yangs' translation and the Hawkes and Minford translation. The names of some characters sound like the words for their personality traits, and some names serve as allusions. Hawkes conveys the communicative function of the names rather than lexical equivalence; for example, Huo Qi is homonymous with "the beginning of catastrophe", and Hawkes makes the English name "Calamity". Hawkes sometimes uses Italian/Sanskrit terms when Western Christian culture lacks a term for a concept. Gladys Yang and Yang Hsien-yi prefer literal translation, informing readers of names' meanings through annotations. Zhu Jian-chun argued that Hawkes' choice to simply translate certain names that are puns makes the author's intentions clearer, and that the Yangs' choice of transliteration leaves the meaning more elusive, even if the transliterated names are more believable as character names. Zhu questioned the Yangs' translation of "Dao Ren" as "reverend". According to Barry Lee Reynolds and Chao-Chih Liao, the Yangs' version contains more faithful translations of religious expressions but is also less readable to English language readers. Xuxiang Suo argued, "Hawkes successfully conveyed the original textual information to foreign readers with smooth and beautiful English, but the loss of Chinese culture-loaded information is inevitable. Mr. Yang mostly adopted the way of literal translation, trying his best to keep the true and idiomatic Chinese style and national tint."

== Sequels and continuations ==
Owing to its immense popularity, numerous sequels and continuations to the novel have been published, even during the Qing era. There are currently more than thirty recorded sequels or continuations to the novel, including modern ones. Modern (post-1949) continuations tend to follow after the eightieth chapter, and include those by Zhang Zhi, Zhou Yuqing, Hu Nan and Liu Xinwu.

== Adaptations ==
The earliest recorded adaptation of the novel, starring Peking opera artist Mei Lanfang as Lin Daiyu

At least fourteen cinematic adaptations of the Dream of the Red Chamber have been made, including a short film in 1924 starring Mei Lanfang, a lost 1927 version by Ren Pengnian and Yu Boyan, the 1944 film directed by Bu Wancang, the 1977 Shaw Brothers adaptation starring Sylvia Chang and Brigitte Lin, and the 1988 film directed by Xie Tieli (謝鐵驪) and Zhao Yuan (趙元). This last film took two years to prepare and three years to shoot, and remains, at 735 minutes, the longest Chinese film ever made.

In 1947, Cantonese opera playwright Fung Chi‑faan (馮志芬) and Chan Kwun Hing (陳冠卿) adapted Dream of the Red Chamber into the celebrated opera titled The Love Monk Steals into the Xiaoxiang Pavilion (情僧偷到瀟湘館, also known as The Romantic Monk), written for Ho Fei‑fan’s (何非凡) Fei Fan Heung Opera Troupe (非凡響劇團). With Ho Fei‑fan starring as Jia Baoyu, the production became a cultural phenomenon, achieving record‑breaking runs in Guangzhou and Hong Kong. Its immense popularity established Ho Fei‑fan as the era’s famed "Romantic Monk" and secured the opera’s place as a cornerstone of Red Chamber‑inspired Cantonese opera.

In 1981, Jiangsu Song and Dance Ensemble premiered a dance drama version of Dream of the Red Chamber. A reworked version was performed in 1982 in Beijing by China Opera and Dance Drama Theatre featuring lead dancer Chen Ailian.

At least ten television adaptations have been produced (excluding numerous Chinese opera adaptations), and they include the renowned 1987 television series, which is regarded by many within China as being a near-definitive adaptation of the novel. It was initially somewhat controversial as few Redologists believed a television adaptation could do the novel full justice. Producer and director Wang Fulin's decision in employing non-professional young actors was vindicated as the television series gained enormous popularity in China. The series' success owes much to composer Wang Liping (王立平). He set many of the novel's classical verses to music, taking as long as four years to deliberate and complete his compositions. Other television versions include a 1996 Taiwanese series and a 2010 version directed by Fifth Generation director Li Shaohong.

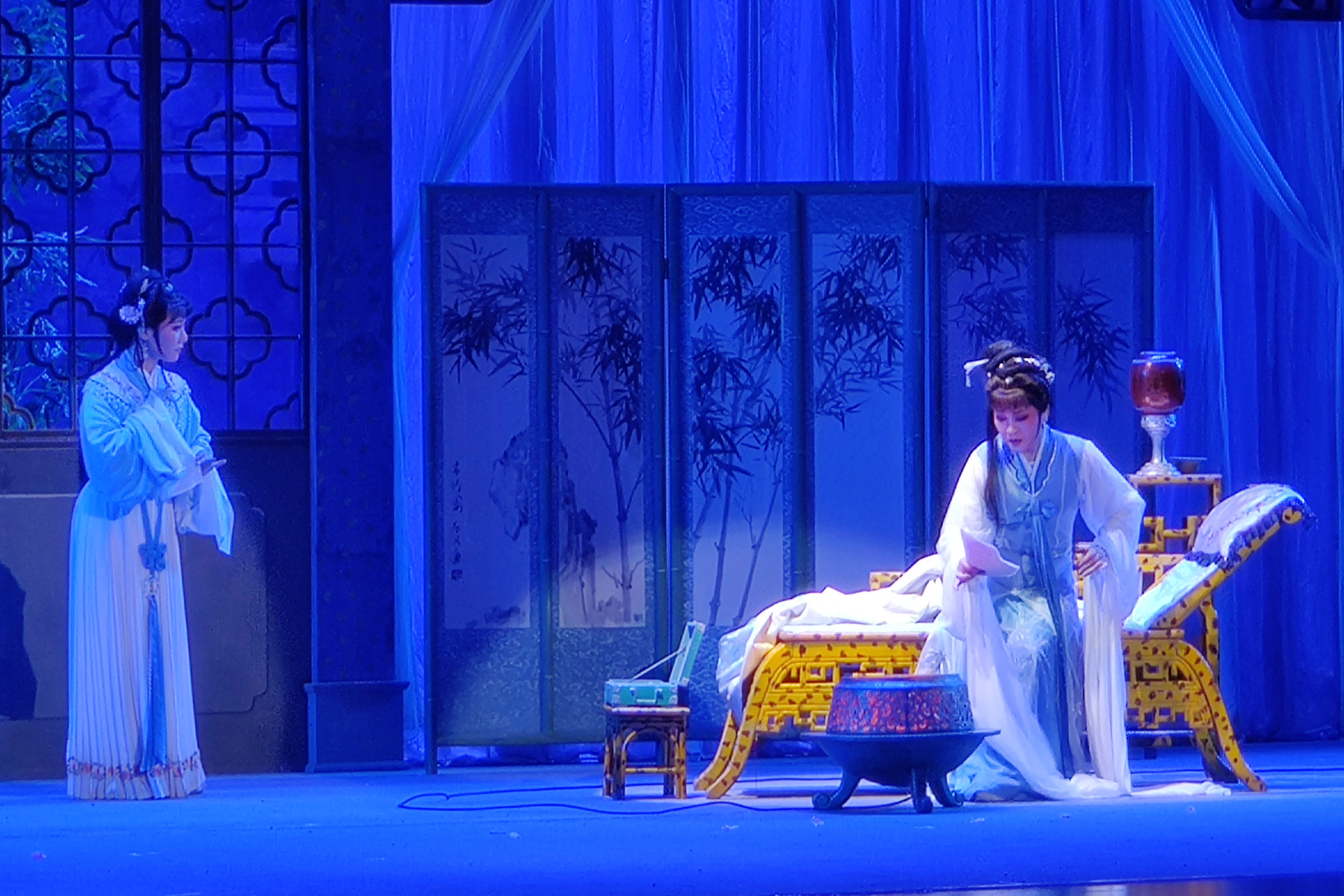
A scene from Dream of the Red Chamber as depicted in Chinese opera

Unlike the other great Chinese novels, particularly Romance of the Three Kingdoms and Journey to the West, the Dream of the Red Chamber has received little attention in the gaming world, with only two Chinese language visual novels having been released as of 2017. Hong Lou Meng and Hong Lou Meng: Lin Daiyu yu Bei Jingwang (紅樓夢：林黛玉與北静王) were both released by Beijing Entertainment All Technology (北京娛樂通). The latter one was released on 8 January 2010, and it is an extended version of the first game, with the main heroines of the game fully voiced and additional CG+endings.

An English-language opera based on the novel in two acts was composed by Chinese American composer Bright Sheng, with libretto by Sheng and David Henry Hwang. The three-hour opera had its world premiere on 10 September 2016, by the San Francisco Opera. For their 2020 album, Transience of Life, the American art-rock band Elysian Fields set several poems from the novel to music.

In the 2023 video game Limbus Company created by South Korean studio Project Moon, character Jia Baoyu, going by the alias Hong Lu, is based on Dream of the Red Chamber. He is one of the 12 playable Sinners in the game, and wields a guandao. His Canto's setting and the characters in it take many of the locations and character names from the novel.
