= Qin Zhong (character) =

Dream of the Red Chamber character

Qin Zhong (Chinese: 秦鐘; pinyin: Qín Zhōng) is a secondary character in Cao Xueqin's classic 18th century Chinese novel Dream of the Red Chamber. He is Qin Keqing's younger brother and Jia Baoyu's handsome best friend and schoolmate. One interpretation is that his name, Qin Zhong, is a pun for qingzhong (passion incarnate), and that as his sister Qinshi initiates Baoyu into heterosexual relations in his dream, Qin Zong initiates him into homosexual ones.

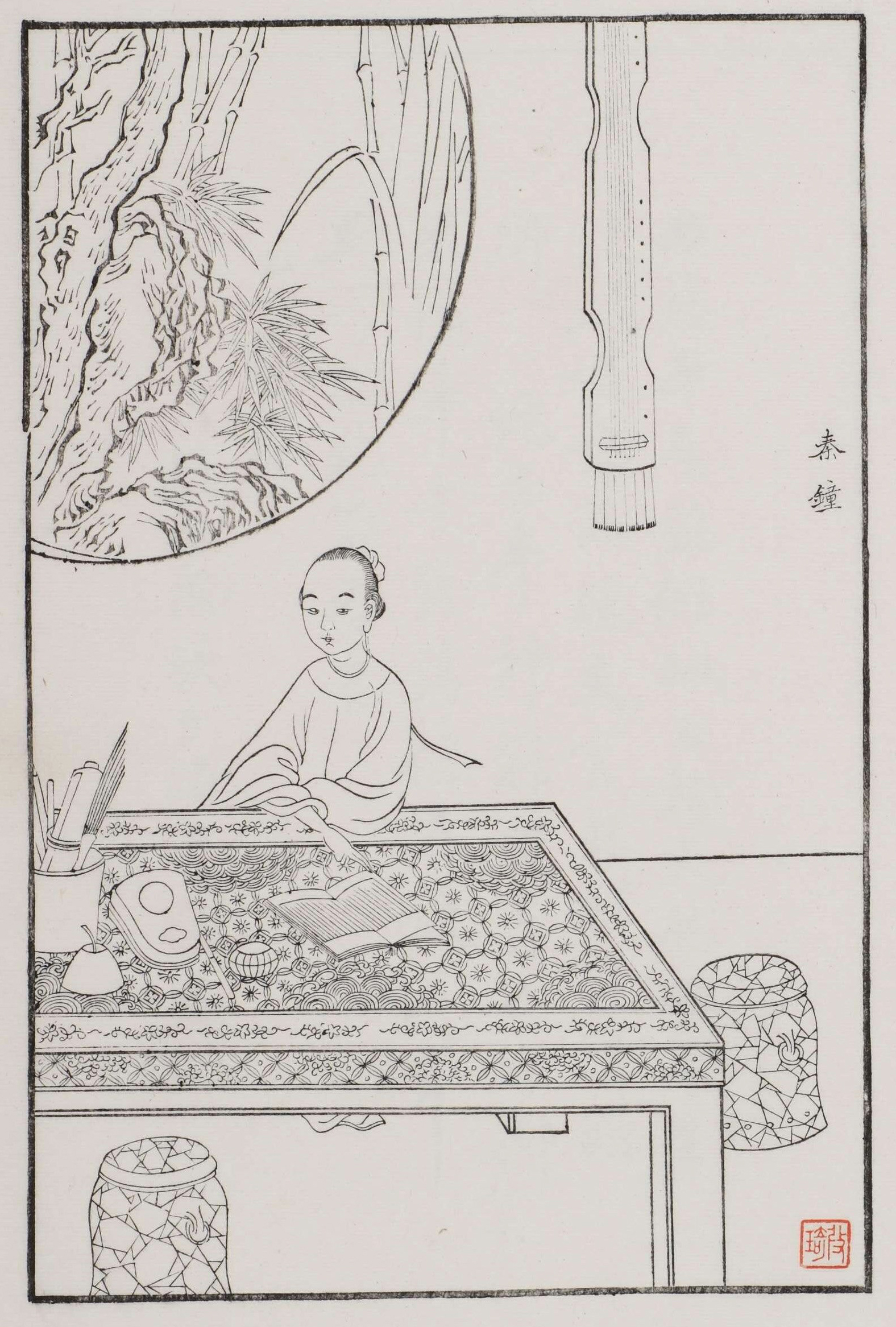
Qin Zhong

Qin Zhong is around 12 when he first meets Baoyu and only survives for a few years. His (adoptive) elder sister is Qin Keqing, Baoyu's nephew Jia Rong's wife, and so he is technically a generation younger than Baoyu. The two boys get along marvelously well and decide to enroll in the Jia clan's school together and become study-mates. He becomes Baoyu's best friend and perhaps lover, mocked by schoolmates for their closeness.

Qin Zhong and the little novice bhikkhuni Zhineng (智能, "Intelligent", called "Sapientia" in the Hawkes translation), who grew up visiting the Jia household, eventually fall in love. Zhineng absconds from the Water-Moon Priory and makes her way into the city to find Qin Zhong, but is chased away at the door by his father. After giving Qin Zhong a severe beating, Qin Ye succumbs to anger and shock. Qin Zhong, already just recovering from illness, dies from a combination of the severe beating, and overwhelming grief and remorse.
