= Nguyễn An =

Chinese eunuch (1381–1453)

Chinese name
- Chinese: 阮安
Transcriptions
Standard Mandarin
- Hanyu Pinyin: Ruǎn Ān
- Wade–Giles: Juan An

Vietnamese name
- Vietnamese alphabet: Nguyễn An
- Chữ Hán: 阮安

Nguyễn An (Chinese 阮安; 1381 - 1453), known in Chinese as Ruan An (pinyin) or Juan An (Wade-Giles), was a Ming dynasty architect and hydraulics specialist between the first and fifth decades of the 15th century. According to some sources, Born in Vietnam, he was taken as tribute to China and later became a eunuch and architect in service to the Chinese emperors. He, along with other architects, such as master designers and planners Cai Xin (蔡信), Kuai Xiang (蒯祥), Chen Gui (陳珪), and Wu Zhong (吳中), was a builder of the Forbidden City in Beijing.

Under the reign of the Zhengtong Emperor, Nguyen An also had a role in the reconstruction of the wall of Beijing. He was also a hydraulics specialist, and was involved in at least three hydraulic projects and had a flawless record. He died in 1453.

== See also ==
- History of the Forbidden City
