= Hoise Niru =

Qing dynasty Chinese military unit

Hoise Niru (Manchu:ᡥᠣᡳᠰᡝ
ᠨᡳᡵᡠ, Chinese: 回子佐領) was a military unit of the Qing dynasty of China. It was affiliated with the Imperial Household Department and Plain White Banner. Formally, this niru was known as the 7th (Hoise niru) of the 5th booi jalan of Plain white banner (正白旗包衣第五參領第七佐領).

Members of this niru originally came from the Islamic Yarkent Khanate. Starting from the year of 1759, an increasing number of people from the region of Yarkent began to migrate into Qing territory. In 1760, according to the edict of Qianlong Emperor, a new niru was formed in order to include all the Muslim immigrants from Yarkent.

The affiliation of Hoise niru was determined by its military rank in the Eight Banners system. Since members of this niru were categorized as booi of the plain white banner, one of the upper three banners that were commanded by Qing emperor himself, they were by default members of the imperial household department. This arrangement meant that the members of Hoise niru did not perform real military services. Instead, like Cigu niru and Solho niru, they were royal butlers of the house of Aisin-Gioro.

According to "Tingyu Congtan", the personal notes from Fuge who was a member of Cigu niru, members of Hoise niru were not allowed to be promoted beyond the 5th rank.

== See also ==
- Cigu Niru
- Solho Niru
- Oros Niru
