= Hoppo =

Official in Qing-dynasty China responsible for regulating trade in the Pearl River Delta

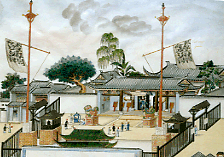
The Customs House and the Hoppo's Headquarters at Guangzhou

Hoppo or Administrator of the Canton Customs (simplified Chinese: 粤海关部; traditional Chinese: 粵海關部; pinyin: Yuèhǎi Guānbù), was the Qing dynasty official at Guangzhou (Canton) given responsibility by the emperor for controlling shipping, collecting tariffs, and maintaining order among traders in and around the Pearl River Delta from 1685 to 1904.

Initially, the Hoppo was always a Manchu and a bondservant of the imperial family, appointed personally by the emperor, not a scholar-official chosen through the exams, but after the mid-18th century this expectation was relaxed. Since he depended on the good will of emperor and the Imperial Household Department, the Hoppo could be trusted to send revenues directly to the court rather than through the normal bureaucratic channels. In the mid-18th century the Qianlong emperor approved the Canton system, which restricted the burgeoning overseas trade with Europeans to Canton and granted a monopoly on that trade to Chinese merchants, who formed the Thirteen Hongs. European governments likewise granted monopolies to their trading companies, such as the British East India Company. Regulating the lucrative trade between the monopolies on either side gave the Hoppo great leeway in setting and collecting tariffs and fees, which were substantial, and the additional surcharges, bribes, and customary fees enabled him to send even more substantial sums to Beijing.

As the opium traffic grew in the late 18th and early 19th centuries, the Hoppo was caught between conflicting demands. On the one hand, the British Parliament ended the East India Company's monopoly in 1834 and traders now demanded free trade and low, fixed tariffs; on the other hand, the Manchu court expected the Hoppo to control the foreign traders, stop Chinese smuggling, eliminate the opium trade, but continue to supply substantial revenue. Foreign objections to monopoly and his irregular impositions were among the causes of the Opium War (1839-1842). The Treaty of Nanking (1842) ended the Canton System but the office of Hoppo was not abolished until 1904 as part of the reforms at the end of the dynasty.

The word "Hoppo" is Chinese Pidgin English. Some have speculated that it derived from Hu Bu ("Board of Revenue", simplified Chinese: 户部; traditional Chinese: 戶部). But the Hoppo had no connection to the Board, leaving the origin of the word uncertain.

== The early history and functions of the office, 1685–1759 ==
The position of Administrator of the Canton Customs (Hoppo) was established in 1685, when the Manchus had largely conquered the south. In the early years of the dynasty they feared that rebels and remnants of the Ming dynasty would attack from the sea, but now it felt safe to end restrictions on sea trade and allow ports along the southern coast to re-open. There were Hoppos at other ports, including Macao and Fujian. Initially, the emperor appointed Manchu bond-servants to the office, who would be dependent on the imperial clan and could be trusted to serve their interests. The opportunity to gather revenue was not limited to the regular tax quota set in the official regulations, a figure determined by the number of foreign ships that came to Canton, but included the unofficial quota and further extractions, each of which was roughly equal to the regular quota. The regular quota was sent to the provincial treasury, but the extra tax quota and exactions were sent directly to the Imperial Household Department, which was controlled by the imperial clan.

Hoppos met resistance from all sides. On the Chinese side were powerful merchants, the Thirteen Hongs, who, in many cases, had been in the import and export business for generations and could outlast any individual Hoppo, who depended on them for cash and local knowledge; on the European side, the British East India Company (E.I.C.), the Dutch East India Company (V.O.C.), and the Swedish East India Company, who had government covenents that guaranteed them monopolies, wanted the Hoppo to set low, predictable, and quickly settled charges. The emperor divided coastal trade coast into three types: internal trade, including trade with other ports up and down the coast; trade with Southeast Asia; and trade with European powers. In order to keep the office from accumulating too much power, the emperor allowed the Hoppo to touch only the European trade, although this type of trade turned out to be the most lucrative and, in the mid-18th century, fastest growing. The Viceroy of Guangdong and Guangxi, who had power over two provinces, might remain in office for a decade and was Han Chinese, tried to undermine the Hoppo's power and collect the lucrative fees for themselves. The place of the Hoppo in the bureaucratic structure changed several times in a series of attempts to strike a balance between the Hoppo and the governor. At a certain point, one official served as both Viceroy and Hoppo; then there were two Hoppos; then the office virtually disappeared and the duties were carried out by provincial officials; and finally, in the 1750s, the Viceroy was appointed as Hoppo even though there was a Hoppo in office. In 1761, the court once again made the Hoppo an independent post, though with less power, and no longer was it only for ethnic Manchus.

== Under the Canton System, 1759–1842 ==
The Hoppo became central to China's trade relations with Europe after 1756, when the Canton system limited European trade to Canton and granted a monopoly in doing business with foreigners to a restricted group of Chinese merchants, who were organized into "Hongs," or "trading houses." Controlling relations between these two monopolies made the Hoppo's position lucrative but not comfortable. He had to pay off influential officials in order to be considered for appointment, pay them again once he was in office, and pay them once more at the end of his term if he expected to move on to another attractive position. He had only three years in office to recoup the money he had spent to gain it. The Hoppo sent an estimated million or so taels a year to Beijing, but his personal income might be ten or more times as much, perhaps 11 million taels. (Note: Fairbank estimates a million taels to be the equivalent of about $1.35 million in 1970s dollars and 11 million taels to be $16 million in 1970s dollars. The website Measuring Worth calculates 1970s dollars to be from three to ten times as much in 2015 dollars.) Moreover, 18th century Canton trade revenues increased by as much as 300 per cent, most of it in the 1790s.

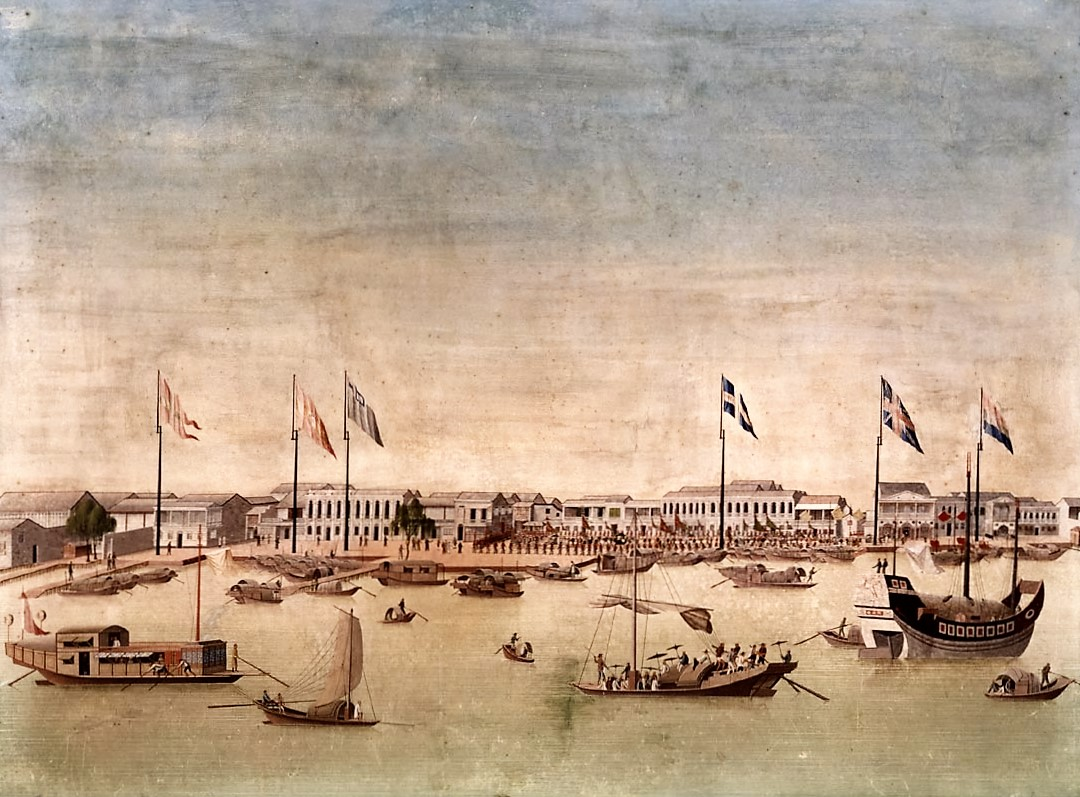
The Hoppo Returning By Boat from an Official Call on the East India Company

The power and responsibility for all aspects of foreign trade were in the hands of the Hoppo. His officers met each ship as it arrived at Whampoa Roads, the landing spot down-river from Canton, where each ship was required to engage a "Chinese linguist," that is, a representative of the Hoppo, as go-between and interpreter. The Hoppo's officers measured the length and width of the ship to determine its cargo capacity, negotiated the payments the ship would pay based on that capacity, and set a time for the ship's officers to meet with the Hoppo, often in his ceremonial hall. In the early years, the Hoppo would personally lead as many as forty or fifty junks and sampans to conduct the measuring ceremony, which was accompanied by fireworks, band music, and, until they were judged too dangerous in the 1780s, cannon salutes. In those years, the Hoppo bestowed impressive gifts on the newly arrived ships, such as two live bulls, but by the early nineteenth century these gifts had become an empty formality.

Partly because of the Hoppo's "cumshaw", that is, the informal payments he solicited, the costs of entering and leaving Canton were probably the highest in the world. One foreign trader's 1753 Hoppo Book listed the tariffs and informal payments collected at Canton, including five kinds of taxes:

- Import Duty: payable by a fixed tariff.
- Export Duty: payable even if the goods are being re-exported to another Chinese port, at a fixed tariff charge, plus a six percent duty
- Extra charges on goods imported or exported: Examples include a duty sent to Beijing; charges for weighers, linguists, and such. These amounted to nearly half the tariff duty.
- The Measurage.
- The Present: Directly to the Hoppo.

Like the emperor he represented, the Hoppo was responsible for the moral and social lives of the people in his jurisdiction. The Hoppo looked after the Canton merchants and foreign traders in matters both small and great: When the daily provisions supplied to the Thirteen Factories were faulty, the foreign merchants complained to the Hoppo; when the constant sound of wood-chopping annoyed a trader, he complained to the Hoppo; in 1832, when a British trader became incensed at what he felt was bad treatment, he set the Hoppo's residence on fire. On the other hand, when the emperor, viceroy, or governor wished to control or chastise the European traders, they gave this burden to the Hoppo, who told the Hong merchants to instruct their foreign partners to "repress their pride and profligacy." In 1759, for instance, the English interpreter James Flint defied Chinese law and custom and went to Tianjin, where he sent a memorial directly to the emperor reporting corruption and malfeasance at Canton; the Hoppo was held responsible for Flint's transgressions, and was immediately dismissed.

More important, in the face of the crisis caused by steeply increasing sales of opium and outflow of silver, the Hoppo was expected to bring the foreign merchants to heel, maintain revenue flows to his superiors, and rein in opium smuggling.

== The opium trade and transformed relations ==
Since the Hoppo was the only Chinese official to have direct contact with the foreign traders, they held him responsible. Respect for him cooled even further with the growth of the opium trade in the early 19th century and turned completely sour after 1834, when England declared free trade and ended the monopoly of the E.I.C. and demanded that China open its markets.

The Hoppo's response was mixed and uncertain. He tolerated smuggling around Canton because he feared that a crackdown would simply force operations elsewhere, disrupt the lucrative trade in tea and cotton, and interfere with the flow of payments to Beijing. Collusion between the Hoppo's men and the smugglers became so well-established and mutually profitable that opium could be shipped directly to Canton rather than being sold offshore clandestinely or warehoused down-river at Whampoa. The Hoppo had little reason to rock the boat or look beyond his three-year term. Besides, when they sold opium directly to Chinese distributors, foreign traders no longer relied on the Hoppo to make arrangements or need him to pay off the governor and other officials, since the Chinese distributors now do these tasks for themselves.

The Hoppo was now caught in a dilemma. The court counted on him to send customary revenues but required him to suppress opium; the foreign merchants increasingly blamed him for the barriers that kept them from what they thought of as the vast China market and they demanded low and fixed tariffs rather than the duties set ship-by-ship.

This mixture of toleration and collusion came to an end in 1839 when Viceroy Lin Zexu arrived with a strong new imperial mandate to wipe out the opium trade. During the confrontations and battles of the First Opium War, the Hoppo had no power over the foreign traders or leverage over the Chinese ones. After the British decisively defeated the Chinese, they imposed treaties that ended the Canton System by publishing fixed tariffs and opening trade at four more treaty ports, but the office of Hoppo continued.

== The late 19th century ==
By the end of the century, Chinese maritime customs officials had lost much of their importance to the Imperial Maritime Customs Service. The position of Canton superintendent, still referred to colloquially as "Hoppo", was abolished in 1904 as part of the late Qing reforms. Sir Robert Hart, Inspector General of the Customs Service, wrote to a friend, "Did you see that the old post of Hoppo at Canton has been abolished? This is a good step and will make financial reform possible at Canton".

== Changing views ==
Western historians initially echoed the views of British traders and diplomats who saw the Hoppo as obstructing China's entrance into the era of free trade and global interchange. Hosea Ballou Morse, the early chronicler of China's foreign relations, acidly remarked that the Hoppo's office was established "in order to milk the trade of the wealthiest trading mart in the empire, and the incumbent of the post luxuriated in the abundant supply of the richest milk during the whole time that Canton enjoyed its statutory and actual monopoly of foreign trade". Morse wrote that "a share in his gains passed directly to the inmates of the Imperial palace, from the highest down the scale to concubines and eunuchs". Morse saw the office as an obstacle to progress: "the office of the Hoppo and a fixed tariff did not harmonize, for the proper performance of the duties of a Hoppo depended on the magnitude of the margin between the revenue collection as officially reported and the sums actually taken from the traders." Austin Coates wrote of the "caprice, the greed and the injustice of the Hoppo and his mandarins"

Other late twentieth century historians were less sympathetic with foreign demands and explanations. Cheong Weng Eang, for instance, publishing in 1997, explained the Hoppo's apparent inefficiency and evasion of responsibility as the bureaucracy's way of reconciling diverse interests.

== Origin of the word ==
The word "hoppo" is Chinese Pidgin English, and some have speculated that it derived from "Hubu" (Board of Revenue). But the historian Jacques Downs says that origin of the word is unknown, as the Hoppo had no connection to the Board, and sent revenues to the Imperial Household, two units whose interests were antagonistic. Henry Yule and A. C. Burnell in their Hobson-Jobson Glossary of Anglo-Chinese Words note that the term "is said to be a corruption of Hoo poo [Hubu]" and that Samuel Wells Williams gives a "different account", but that "neither gives much satisfaction."
