= Minggatu =

Mongolian astronomer and mathematician

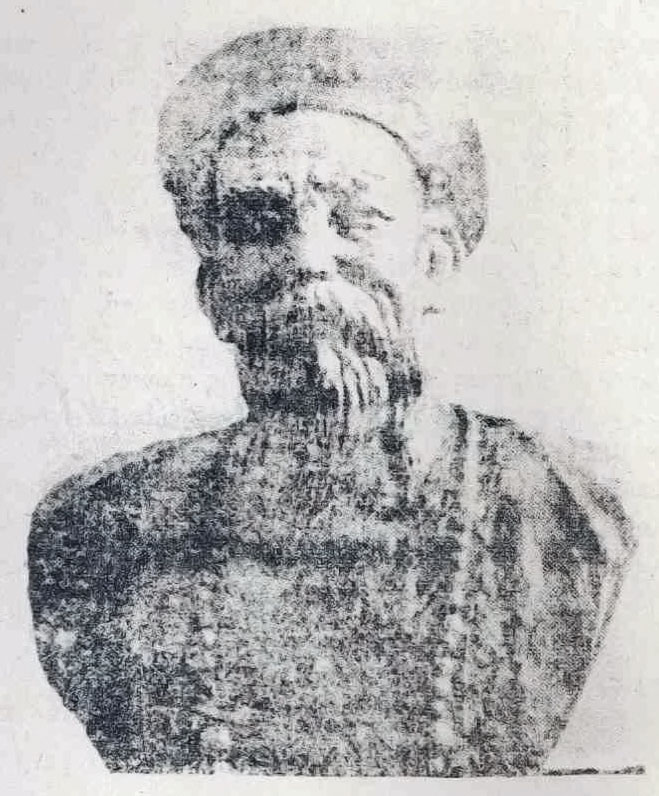
- Born: Sharavyn Myangat c.1692 Plain White Banner, Qing Dynasty (now Plain and Bordered White Banner, Xilin Gol League, Inner Mongolia)
- Died: 1763 (aged 70–71)
- Other names: Ming Antu; Jing An
- Occupations: Mathematician, Astronomer
- Known for: Catalan numbers

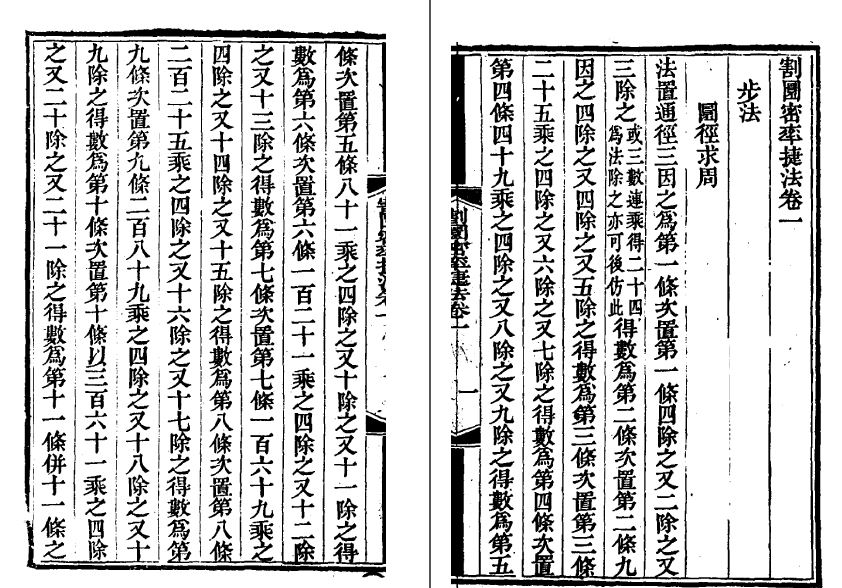
A page from Minggatu's Geyuan Milü Jiefa

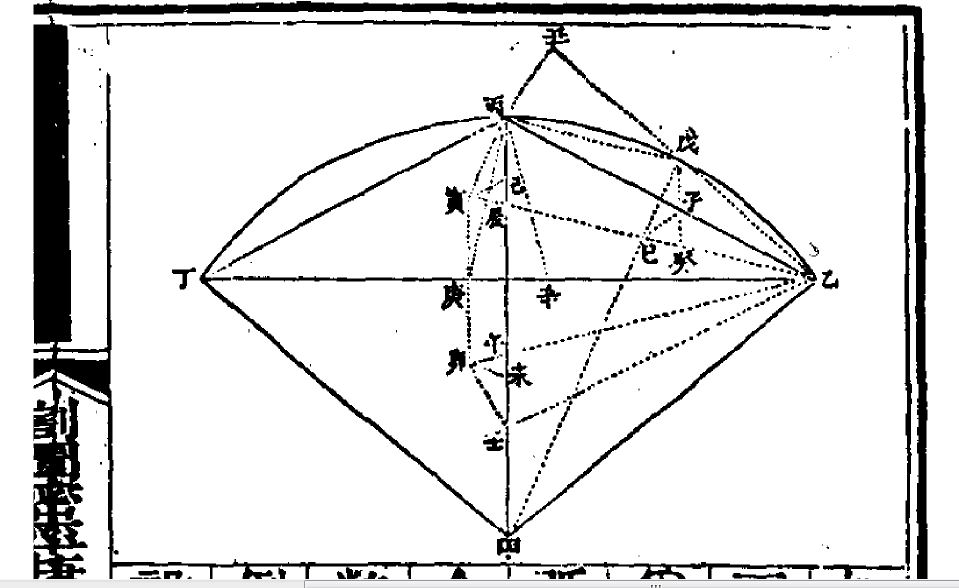
Minggatu's geometrical model for trigonometric infinite series

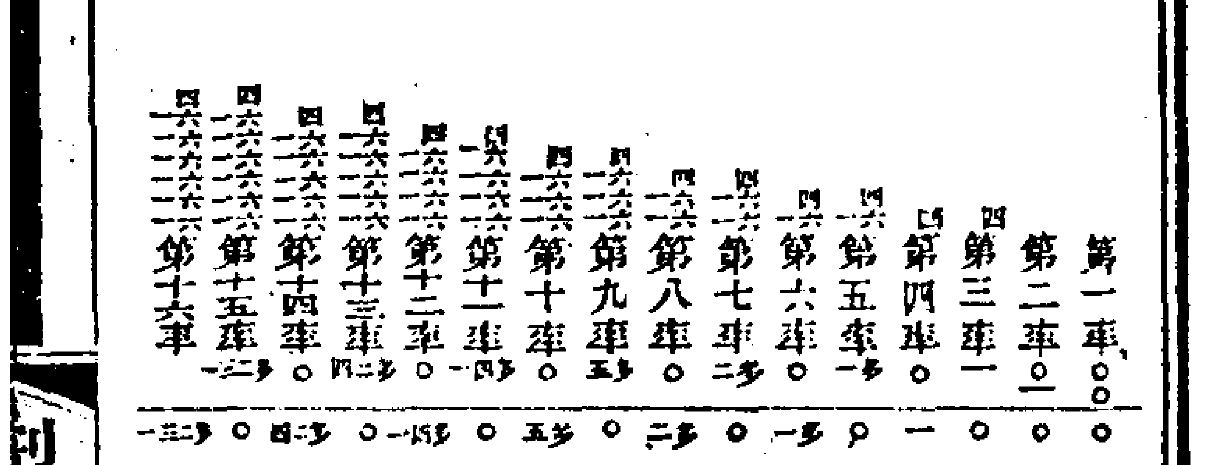
Minggatu discovered Catalan numbers

Minggatu (Mongolian script: ᠮᠢᠩᠭᠠᠲᠦ; Chinese: 明安图; pinyin: Míng'āntú, c. 1692 – c. 1763), full name Sharavyn Myangat (Mongolian: Шаравын Мянгат), also known as Ming Antu, was a Mongolian astronomer, mathematician, and topographic scientist at the Qing court. His courtesy name was Jing An (静安).

Minggatu was born in Plain White Banner (now Plain and Bordered White Banner, Xilin Gol League, Inner Mongolia) of the Qing Empire. He was of the Sharaid clan. His name first appeared in official Chinese records in 1713, among the Kangxi Emperor's retinue, as a shengyuan (state-subsidized student) of the Imperial Astronomical Bureau. He worked there at a time when Jesuit missionaries were in charge of calendar reforms. He also participated in the work of compiling and editing three very important books in astronomy and joined the team of China's area measurement.

From 1724 up to 1759, he worked at the Imperial Observatory. He participated in drafting and editing the calendar and the study of the armillary sphere.

His seminal work The Quick Method for Obtaining the Precise Ratio of Division of a Circle (Chinese: 割圜密率捷法; pinyin: Gēyuán Mìlǜ Jiéfǎ), which was completed after his death by his son Mingshin, and students (among them his most gifted pupil Chen Jihin and an intendant in the minister of finance, Zhang), was a significant contribution to the development of mathematics in China.

He was the first person in Inner Mongolia who calculated infinite series and obtained more than 10 formulae. In the 1730s, he first established and used what was later to be known as Catalan numbers. The Jesuit missionaries' influence can be seen by many traces of European mathematics in his works, including the use of Euclidean notions of continuous proportions, series addition, subtraction, multiplication and division, series reversion, and the binomial theorem. Minggatu's work is remarkable in that expansions in series, trigonometric and logarithmic were apprehended algebraically and inductively without the aid of differential and integral calculus.

In 1742 he participated in the revision of the Compendium of Observational and Computational Astronomy. In 1756, he participated in the surveying of the Dzungar Khanate (renamed Xinjiang), which was incorporated into the Qing Empire by the Qianlong Emperor. It was due to his geographical surveys in Xinjiang that the Complete Atlas of the Empire (the first atlas of China drawn with scientific methods) was finished.

From 1760 to 1763, shortly before his death, he was administrator of the Imperial Astronomical Bureau.

== Later recognition ==
In 1910, Japanese mathematician Yoshio Mikami mentioned that Minggatu was the first Mongolian who had ever entered into the field of analytical research methods.

Mathematician Dr. P. J. Larcombe of Derby University published seven papers on Minggatu and his work in 1999, including the stimulus of Jesuit missionary, engineer, mathematician and geographer Pierre Jartoux, who brought three infinite series to China early in the 1700s.

On May 26, 2002, the minor planet 28242 was named after Minggatu as 28242 Mingantu. The nomination ceremony and traditional meeting were held in Minggatu's hometown in August 2002. More than 500 delegates and 20,000 local residents gathered together to celebrate and a conference on "The Science Contribution of Ming Antu" was held. The Chinese government named Minggatu’s hometown as "Ming Antu Town".

== See also ==
- Ming Antu's infinite series expansion of trigonometric functions
