= Ming Antu's infinite series expansion of trigonometric functions =

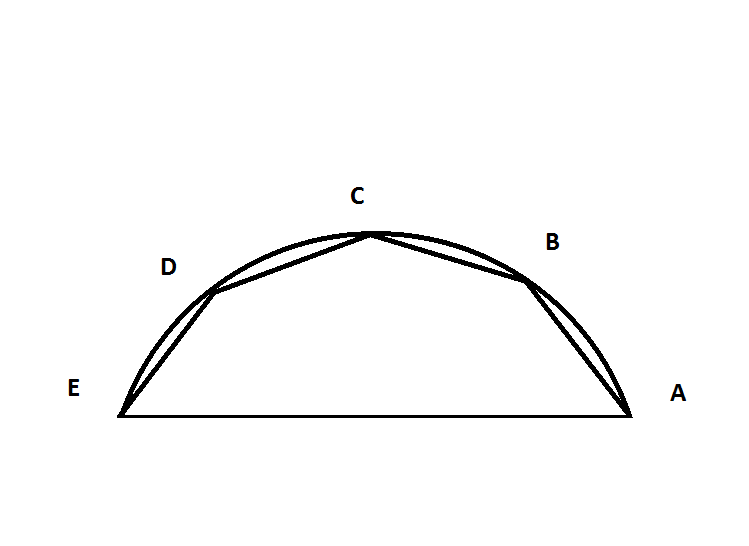
Fig. 1: The Ming Antu Model

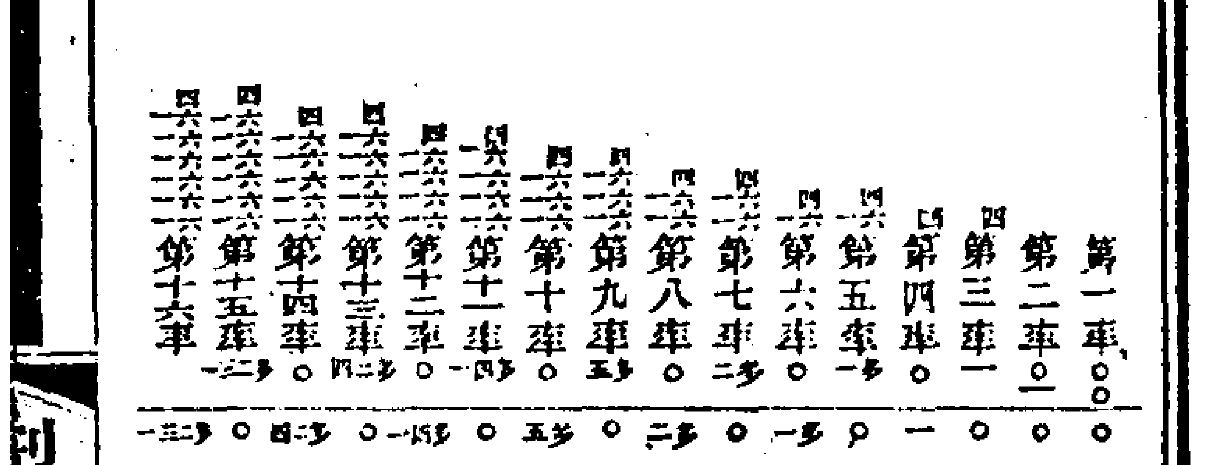
Fig. 3: Ming Antu independently discovered Catalan numbers.

Ming Antu's infinite series expansion of trigonometric functions. Ming Antu, a court mathematician of the Qing dynasty did extensive work on the infinite series expansion of trigonometric functions in his masterpiece Geyuan Milü Jiefa (Quick Method of Dissecting the Circle and Determination of The Precise Ratio of the Circle). Ming Antu built geometrical models based on a major arc of a circle and the nth dissection of the major arc. In Fig 1, AE is the major chord of arc ABCDE, and AB, BC, CD, DE are its nth equal segments. If chord AE = y, chord AB = BC = CD = DE = x, the task was to find chord y as the infinite series expansion of chord x. He studied the cases of n = 2, 3, 4, 5, 10, 100, 1000 and 10000 in great detail in volumes 3 and 4 of Geyuan Milü Jiefa.

== Historical background ==
In 1701, French Jesuit missionary Pierre Jartoux (1669-1720) came to China, and he brought along three infinite series expansions of trigonometric functions by Isaac Newton and J. Gregory:

$$\pi=3\left(1+\frac{1}{4\cdot3!}+\frac{3^2}{4^2\cdot5!}+\frac{3^2\cdot5^2}{4^3\cdot7!}+\cdots\right)$$
$$\sin x=x-\frac{x^3}{3!}+\frac{x^5}{5!}-\frac{x^7}{7!}+\cdots$$
$$\operatorname{vers} x=\frac{x^2}{2!}-\frac{x^4}{4!}+\frac{x^6}{6!}+\cdots.$$

These infinite series stirred up great interest among Chinese mathematicians, as the calculation of π with these "quick methods" involved only multiplication, addition or subtraction, being much faster than classic Liu Hui's π algorithm which involves taking square roots. However, Jartoux did not bring along the method for deriving these infinite series. Ming Antu suspected that the Europeans did not want to share their secrets, and hence he was set to work on it. He worked on and off for thirty years and completed a manuscript called Geyuan Milü Jiefa. He created geometrical models for obtaining trigonometric infinite series, and not only found the method for deriving the above three infinite series, but also discovered six more infinite series. In the process, he discovered and applied Catalan numbers.

== Two-segment chord ==
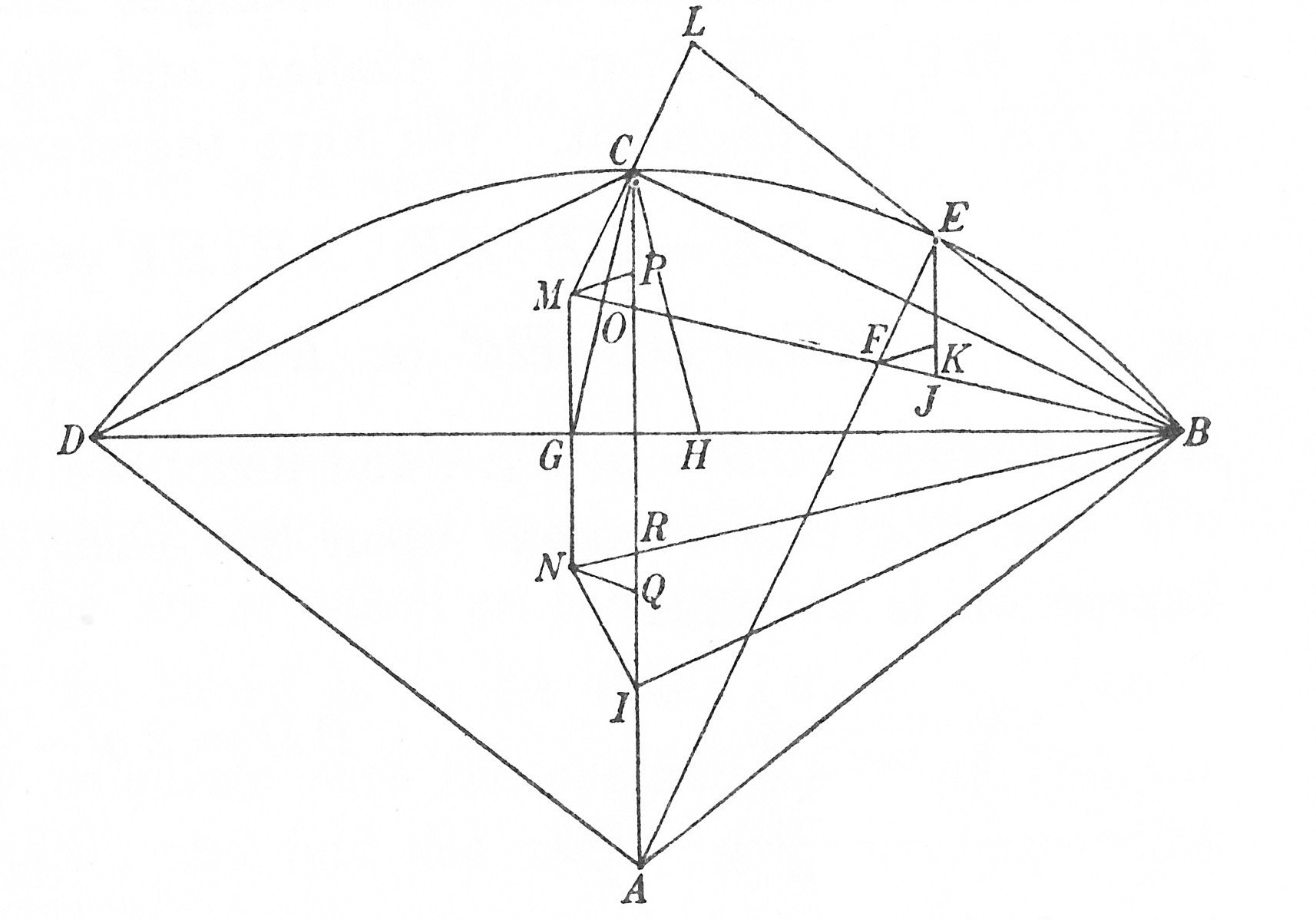
Fig. 2: Ming Antu's geometric model of 2-segment chord

Figure 2 is Ming Antu's model of a 2-segment chord. Arc BCD is a part of a circle with unit (r = 1) radius. AD is the main chord, arc BCD is bisected at C, draw lines BC, CD, let BC = CD = x and let radius AC = 1.

Apparently, $BD = 2x-GH$

Let EJ = EF, FK = FJ; extend BE straight to L, and let EL = BE; make BF = BE, so F is inline with AE. Extended BF to M, let BF = MF; connect LM, LM apparently passes point C. The inverted triangle BLM along BM axis into triangle BMN, such that C coincident with G, and point L coincident with point N. The Invert triangle NGB along BN axis into triangle; apparently BI = BC.

$$AB: BC: CI = 1: x: x^2$$

BM bisects CG and let BM = BC; join GM, CM; draw CO = CM to intercept BM at O; make MP = MO; make NQ = NR, R is the intersection of BN and AC. ∠EBC = 1/2 ∠CAE = 1/2 ∠EAB; $\therefore$ ∠EBM = ∠EAB; thus we obtain a series of similar triangles: ABE, BEF, FJK, BLM, CMO, MOP, CGH and triangle CMO = triangle EFJ;

$$AB: BE: EF: FJ: JK = 1: p: p^2: p^3: p^4$$

$1: BE = BE: EF;$ namely $EF = BE^2$

$$1: BE ^ 2 = x: GH$$

So $GH = x \cdot BE ^ 2 = x p^2$,

and $BD = 2x -x p^2$

Because kite-shaped ABEC and BLIN are similar,.

$$EF = LC = CM = MG = NG = IN$$

$$LM + MN = CM + MN + IN = CI + OP = JK + CI$$

$\therefore AB: (BE + EC) = BL: (LM + MN)$ and $AB: BL = BL: (CI + JK)$
Let $BL = q$
$$AB: BL: (CI + JK) = 1: q: q ^ 2$$

$$JK = p ^ 4$$
$$CI = y ^ 2$$
$$CI + JK = q ^ 2 = BL ^ 2 = (2BE) ^ 2 = (2p) ^ 2 = 4p ^ 2$$

Thus $q ^ 2 = 4p ^ 2$ or $p = \frac {q} {2}$

Further: $CI + JK = x ^ 2 + p ^ 4 = q ^ 2$.

$$x ^ 2 + \frac {q ^ 4} {16} = q ^ 2,$$

then

$$x ^ 2 = q ^ 2- \frac {q ^ 4} {16}$$

Square up the above equation on both sides and divide by 16:
$$\frac {(x ^ 2)^2} {16} = \frac {(q^2- \frac {q^4} {16})^2} {16} = \sum_{j=0}^2 (-1)^j {2 \choose j} \frac {q ^ {2 (2 + j)}} {16 ^ j}$$
$$\frac {x^4} {16} = \frac {q^4} {16} - \frac {q^6} {128} + \frac {q^8} {4096} {16 }$$

And so on

$\frac {x ^ {2n}} {16^{n-1}} = \sum_ {j = 0}^n (-1)^j {n \choose j} \frac {q ^ {2 (n + j)}} {16 ^ {n + j-1}}$.

Add up the following two equations to eliminate $q ^ 4$ items:

$$x ^ 2 = q ^ 2- \frac {q ^ 4} {16}$$

$$\frac {x ^ 4} {16} = {\frac {q ^ 4} {16} - \frac {2 q ^ 6} {16 ^ 2} + \frac {q ^ 8} {4096}} {16}$$

$$x ^ 2 + \frac {x ^ 4} {16} = q ^ 2- \frac {q ^ 6} {128} + \frac {q ^ 8} {4096}$$

$x ^ 2 + \frac {x ^ 4} {16} + \frac {2x ^ 6} {16 ^ 2} = q ^ 2- \frac {5q ^ 8} {4096} + \frac {3q ^ {10}} {32768} - \frac {q ^ {12}} {524288},$(after eliminated $q ^ 6$ item).

......................................

$$\begin{align}
& x ^ 2 + \frac{x^4}{16} + \frac{2 x^6}{16^2} + \frac{5x^8}{16^3} + \frac{14 x^{10}}{16^4} + \frac{42x^{12}}{16^5} \\[10pt]
{} & +\frac{132 x^{14}}{16^6} + \frac{429x^{16}}{16^7} + \frac{1430x^{18}}{16^8} + \frac{4862 x^{20}}{16^9} \\[10pt]
& {} + \frac{16796 x^{22}}{16^{10}} + \frac{58786 x^{24}}{16^{11}} + \frac{208012 x^{26}}{16^{12}} \\[10pt]
& {} + \frac{742900 x^{28}}{16^{13}} + \frac{2674440 x^{30}}{16^{14}} + \frac{9694845 x^{32}}{16^{15}} \\[10pt]
& {} + \frac{35357670 x^{34}}{16^{16}} + \frac{129644790 x^{36}}{16^{17}} \\[10pt]
& {} + \frac{477638700 x^{38}}{16^{18}} + \frac{1767263190 x^{40}}{16^{19}} + \frac{6564120420 x^{42}}{16^{20}} \\[10pt]
& = q^2 + \frac{62985}{8796093022208} q^{24}
\end{align}$$

Expansion coefficients of the numerators: 1, 1, 2, 5, 14, 42, 132 ...... (see Figure II Ming Antu original figure bottom line, read from right to left) are the Catalan numbers; Ming Antu discovered the Catalan number.

Thus:

$q ^ 2 = \sum_ {n = 1} ^ \infty C_n \frac {x ^ {2n}} {4 ^ {2n-2}}$

in which $C_n = \frac {1} {n + 1} {2n \choose n}$ is Catalan number. Ming Antu pioneered the use of recursion relations in Chinese mathematics

$$C_n = \sum_k (-1) ^ k {nk \choose k + 1} C_ {nk}$$

$$\because BC: CG: GH = AB: BE: EF = 1: p: p ^ 2 = x: px: p ^ 2x$$
$$\therefore GH: = p ^ 2 x = (\frac {q} {2}) ^ 2 x = \frac {q ^ 2 x} {4}$$

substituted into $BD = 2x-GH$

Finally he obtained

$$BD = 2x- \frac {x} {4} q ^ 2$$
$$= 2x- \sum_ {n = 1} ^ \infty C_n \frac {x ^ {2n + 1}} {4 ^ {2n-1}}$$

In Figure 1 BAE angle = α, BAC angle = 2α × x = BC = sinα × q = BL = 2BE = 4sin (α /2) × BD = 2sin (2α) Ming Antu obtained $BD = 2x -x\cdot BE ^ 2$

That is
$$\sin (2 \alpha) = 2 \sin \alpha- \sum_ {n = 1} ^ \infty C_n \frac {(\sin \alpha) ^ {2n + 1}} {4 ^ {n-1}}$$
$$= 2 \sin (\alpha) - \frac {2 \sin (\alpha) ^ 3} {1+ \cos (\alpha)}$$

$q ^ 2 = BL ^ 2 = \sum_ {n = 1} ^ \infty C_n \frac {x ^ {2n}} {4 ^ {2n-2}}$

Ie $\sin (\frac {\alpha} {2}) ^ 2 = \sum_ {n = 1} ^ \infty C_n \frac {(sin \alpha) ^ {2n}} {4 ^ {2n}}$

== Three-segment chord ==
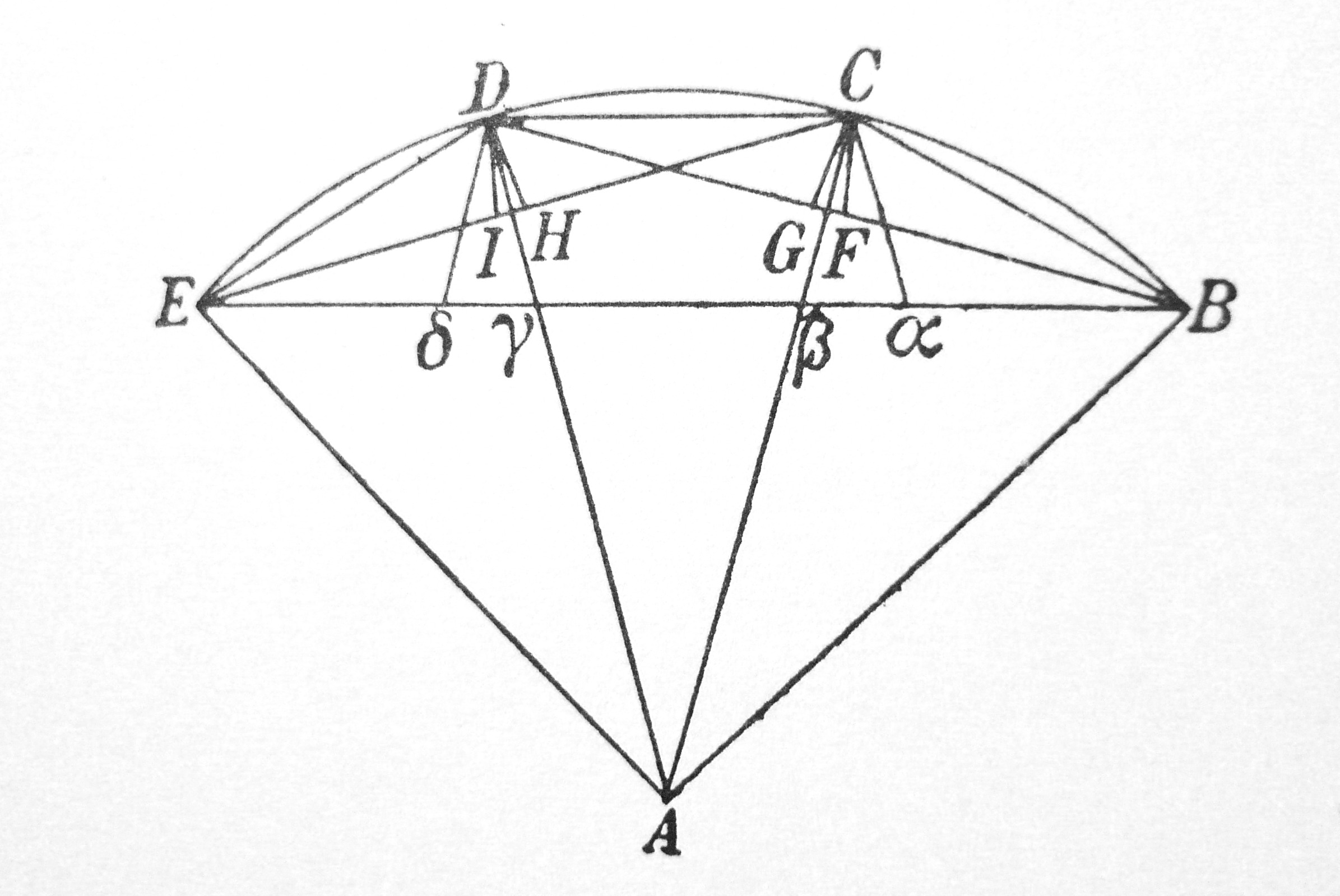
Fig 3. Ming Antu's geometrical model for three segment chord

As shown in Fig 3, BE is a whole arc chord, BC = CE = DE = an are three arcs of equal portions. Radii AB = AC = AD = AE = 1. Draw lines BC, CD, DE, BD, EC; let BG=EH = BC, Bδ = Eα = BD, then triangle Cαβ = Dδγ; while triangle Cαβ is similar to triangle BδD.

As such:

$AB: BC = BC: CG = CG: GF$, $BC: FG = BD: \delta \gamma$

$$2 BD = BE + \delta \alpha$$

$$2 BD- \delta \gamma = BE + BC$$

$\therefore 2 \times BD- \delta \gamma-BC = BE$

Eventually, he obtained

$BE=3\times a-a^3$

== Four-segment chord ==
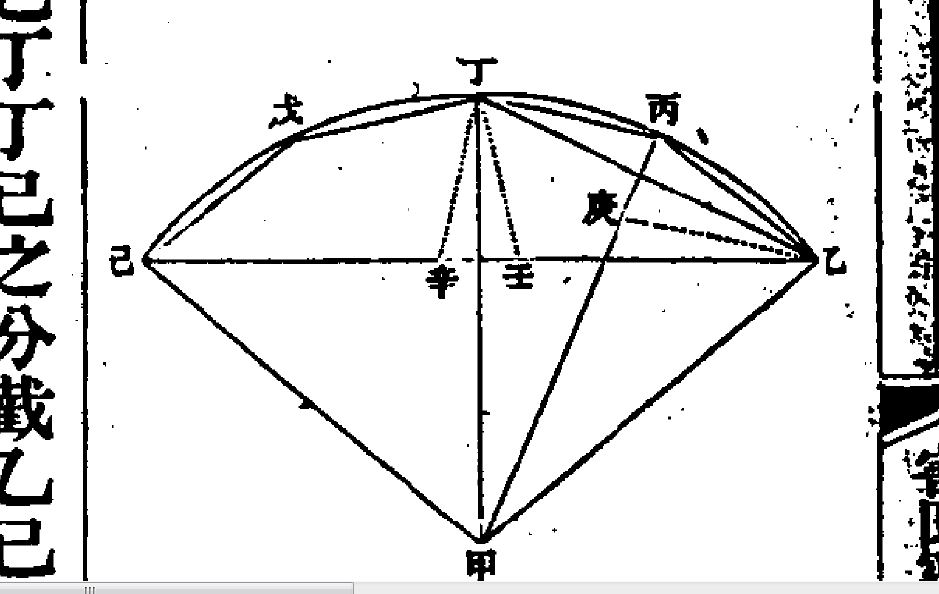
Ming Antu 4 segment chord model

Let $y_4$ denotes the length of the main chord, and let the length of four equal segment chord =x,

$y_4=4\times a-\frac{10\times a^3}{4}+\frac{14\times a^5}{4^3}-\frac{12\times a^7}{4^5}$+......

$4a-10\times a^3/4+\sum_{n=1}^\infty (16C_n-2C_{n+1})\times\frac{a^{2n+1}}{4^{2n-1}}$.

Trigonometry meaning:

$\sin(4\times\alpha)=4\times\sin(\alpha)-10\times\sin^3\alpha$ $+\sum_{n=1}^\infty(16\times C_n-2C_{n+1})\times\frac{\sin^{2n+3}(\alpha)}{4^n}$.

== Five-segment chord ==
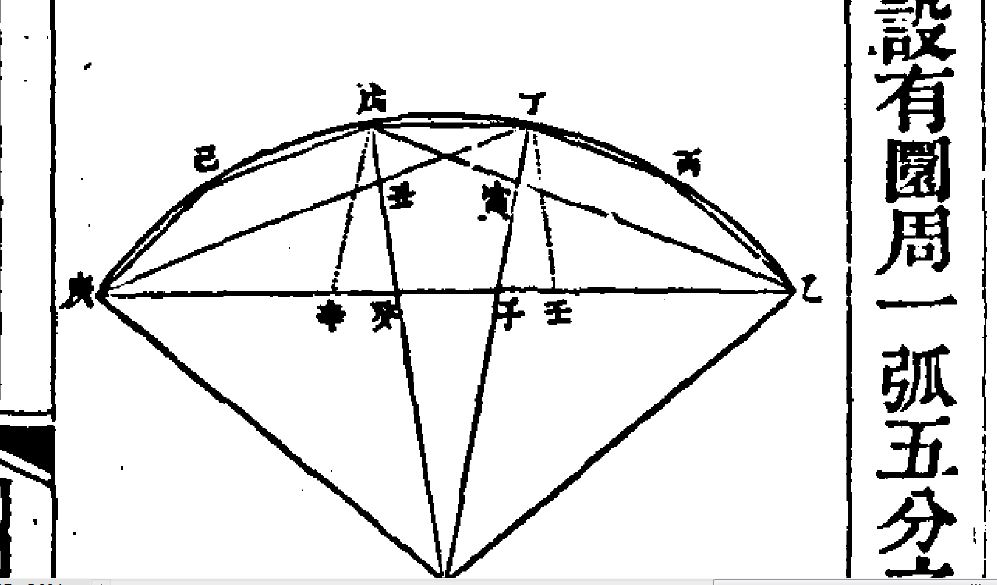
Ming Antu 5 segment chord model

$y_5=5a-5a^3+a^5$

that is
$\sin(5\alpha)=5\sin(\alpha)-20\sin^3(\alpha)+16\sin^5(\alpha)$。

== Ten-segment chord ==
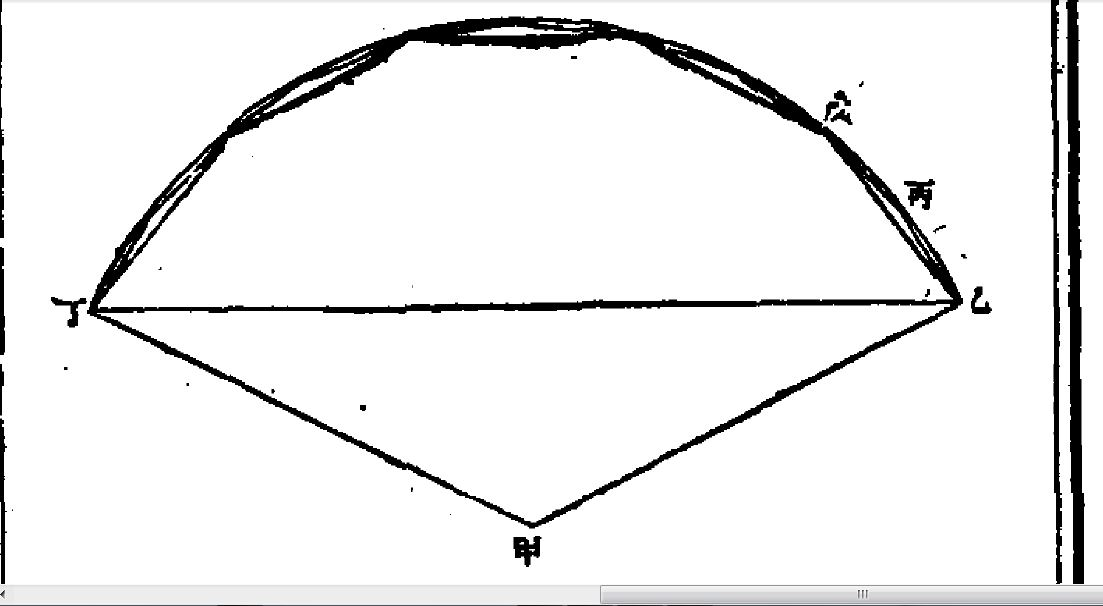
Ming Antu 10 segment chord diagram

From here on, Ming Antu stop building geometrical model, he carried out his computation by pure algebraic manipulation of infinite series.

Apparently ten segments can be considered as a composite 5 segment, with each segment in turn consist of two subsegments.

$\therefore y_{10}=y_5(y_2)$

$y_{10}(a)=5\times y_2-5\times (y_2)^3+(y_2)^5$,

He computed the third and fifth power of infinite series $y_2$ in the above equation, and obtained:

$y_{10}(a)=10\times a-\frac{165\times a^3}{4}+\frac{3003\times a^5}{4^3}-\frac{21450\times a^7}{4^5}$+......

== Hundred-segment chord ==
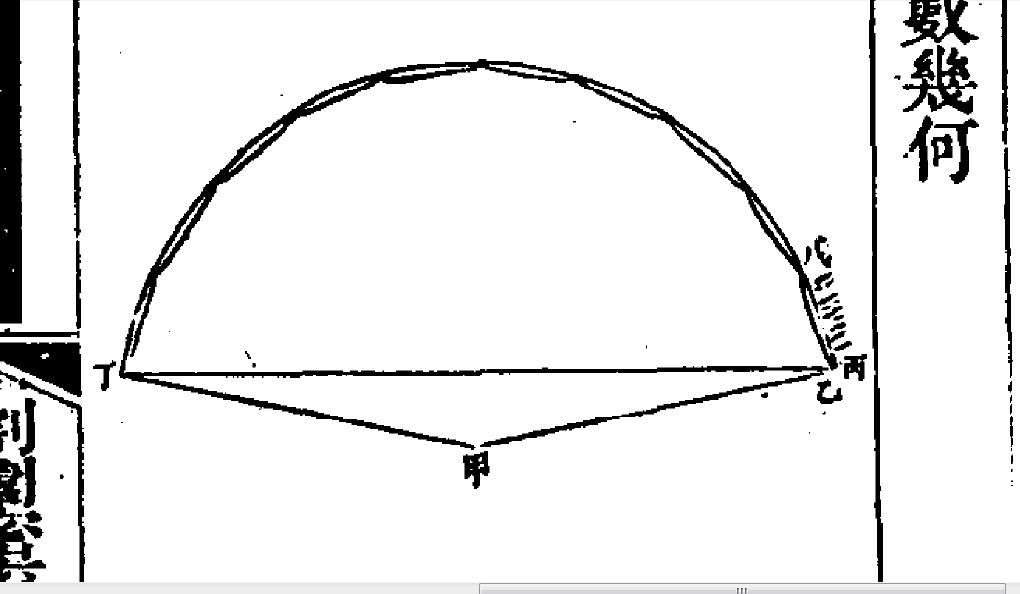
Ming Antu 100 segment chord diagram

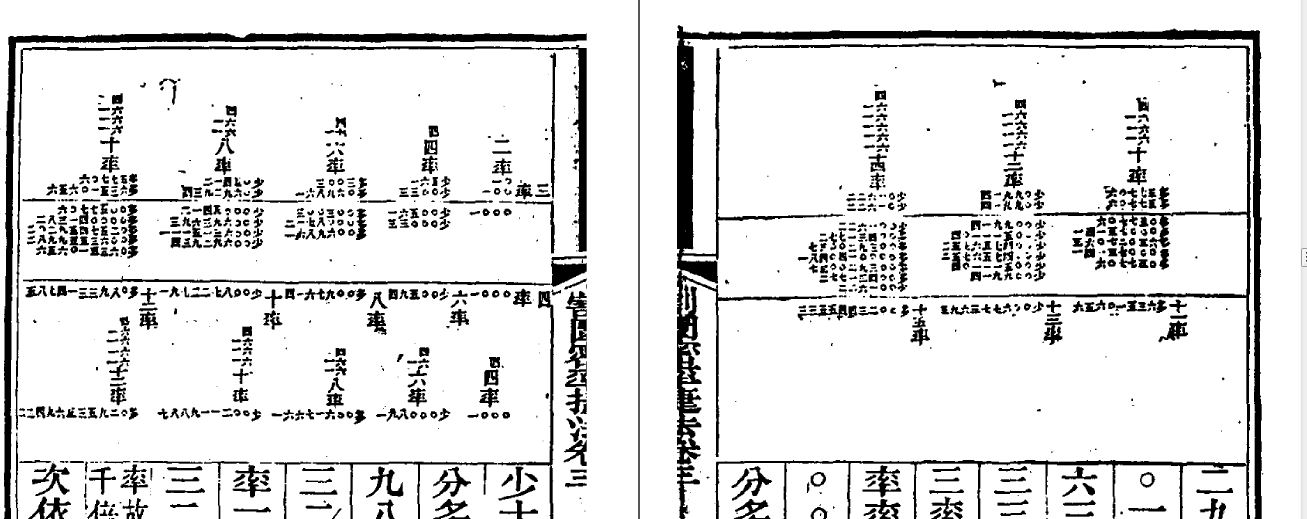
Facsimile of Ming Antu's calculation of 100 segment chord

A hundred segment arc's chord can be considered as composite 10 segment-10 subsegments, thus substituting $a=y_{10}$ into $y_{10}$, after manipulation with infinite series he obtained:

$y_{100}=y_{10}(a=y_{10})$

$$\begin{align} y_{100}(a)=& 100\times a-166650\times\frac{a^3}{4}+333000030\times\frac{a^5}{4\times16}\\ & -316350028500\times\frac{a^7}{4\times16^2}+17488840755750\times\frac{a^9}{4\times16^3}+\ldots\end{align}$$

== Thousand-segment chord ==
$y_{1000}=y_{100}(y_{10})$

$y_{1000}(a)=1000\times a-1666666500\times\frac{a^3}{4}+33333000000300\times\frac{a^5}{4\times16}-3174492064314285000\frac{a^7}{4\times16^2}+$......

== Ten-thousand-segment chord ==
$y_{10000}=10000\times a-\frac{166666665000\times a^3}{4}+\frac{33333330000000300\times a^5}{4^3}+$............

== When number of segments approaches infinity ==
After obtained the infinite series for n=2, 3, 5, 10, 100, 1000, and 10000 segments, Ming Antu went on to handle the case when n approaches infinity.

y100, y1000 and y10000 can be rewritten as:

$y100=100a-\frac{(100a)^3}{24.002400240024002400}+\frac{(100a)^5}{24.024021859697730358\times80}+$..........

$y1000:=1000a-\frac{(1000a)^3}{24.000024000024000024}+\frac{(1000a)^5}{24.000240002184019680\times80}+$..............

$y10000:=10000a-\frac{(10000a)^3}{24.000000240000002400}+\frac{(10000a)^5}{24.000002400000218400\times80}+$..................

He noted that when n approaches infinity, the denominators 24.000000240000002400, 24.000002400000218400×80 approach 24 and 24×80 respectively, and when n -> infinity, na (100a, 1000a, 1000a) becomes the length of the arc; hence

$chord= arc -\frac{arc^3}{4\times3!}+\frac{arc^5}{4^2\times5!}-\frac{arc^7}{4^3\times7!}+$.....

$=\sum_{n=1}^\infty \frac{(-1)^{n-1}\times arc^{2\times n-1}}{(4^{n-1}\times(2\times n-1)!)}$

Ming Antu then performed an infinite series reversion and expressed the arc in terms of its chord

$arc := chord+\frac{chord^3}{24}+\frac{3\times chord^5}{640}+\frac{5\times chord^7}{7168}+$............
