= Cigu Niru =

Type of military unit of Qing China

Cigu Niru (Manchu: ᠴᡳᡤᡠ
ᠨᡳᡵᡠ, Chinese: 旗鼓佐領) was a type of military unit of Qing China. It was one of the Nirus of the Qing army. The Cigu Niru consisted of ethnic Han soldiers who joined the Qing army in the early stage of its rise to power.

Cigu Niru was one of the three Nirus that is affiliated with the Imperial Household Department. Its members belonged to the rank of Booi Aha. This niru, just like all the other Nirus of the Imperial household, should not be confused with the banners of the Eight Banners system. Banners and Nirus may cooperate with each other in particular cases; however, they were administratively parallel. Ujen Coohai Gusa, the banners of Han soldiers in the Eight Banners system, was demographically identical with Cigu Niru although they were two different military units.

Many ethnic Han Cigu Niru obtained their political status during the reign of Qing dynasty. For example, the Cao clan and Gao clan of Cigu Niru. Cao Xueqin, the author of "Dream of Red Chamber", was a member of Cigu Niru. Gao E, the main editor of Cao's work, also came from Cigu Niru.

In terms of civil service, members of Cigu Niru were treated like their ethnic Manchu comrade-in-arms. However, in the imperial examination, members of this niru did not enjoy the privilege that Manchus and Mongols had. The Manchu and Mongol members of niru had a better chance of passing the exam since they were separated from the large pool of Han participants of the exam. Essentially, when a Cigu Niru took the imperial examination, he was classified as a Han due to his ancestry although he has close ties to the Manchus. This racial inequality also existed in terms of military service. Exceptionally, members of Cigu Niru were treated equally in, and only in, the imperial household department where their promotions would not be influenced by their racial background.

In total, there were 18 Cigu Nirus of the imperial household department. After the expulsion of Han banners in 1742, 10 Cigu Nirus remained in service.

== See also ==
- Hoise Niru
- Oros Niru

== Sources ==
- 杜家骥 (2008). 《八旗与清朝政治论稿》. 人民出版社. ISBN 9787010067537.
- 鄂尔泰 等 (1985). 《八旗通志初集》. 东北师范大学出版社.
- 福格 (1984). 《听雨丛谈》. 中华书局. ISBN 9787101016987.
- 弘昼等 (2002). 《八旗满洲氏族通谱》. 辽海出版社. ISBN 9787806691892.
