= History of the Forbidden City =

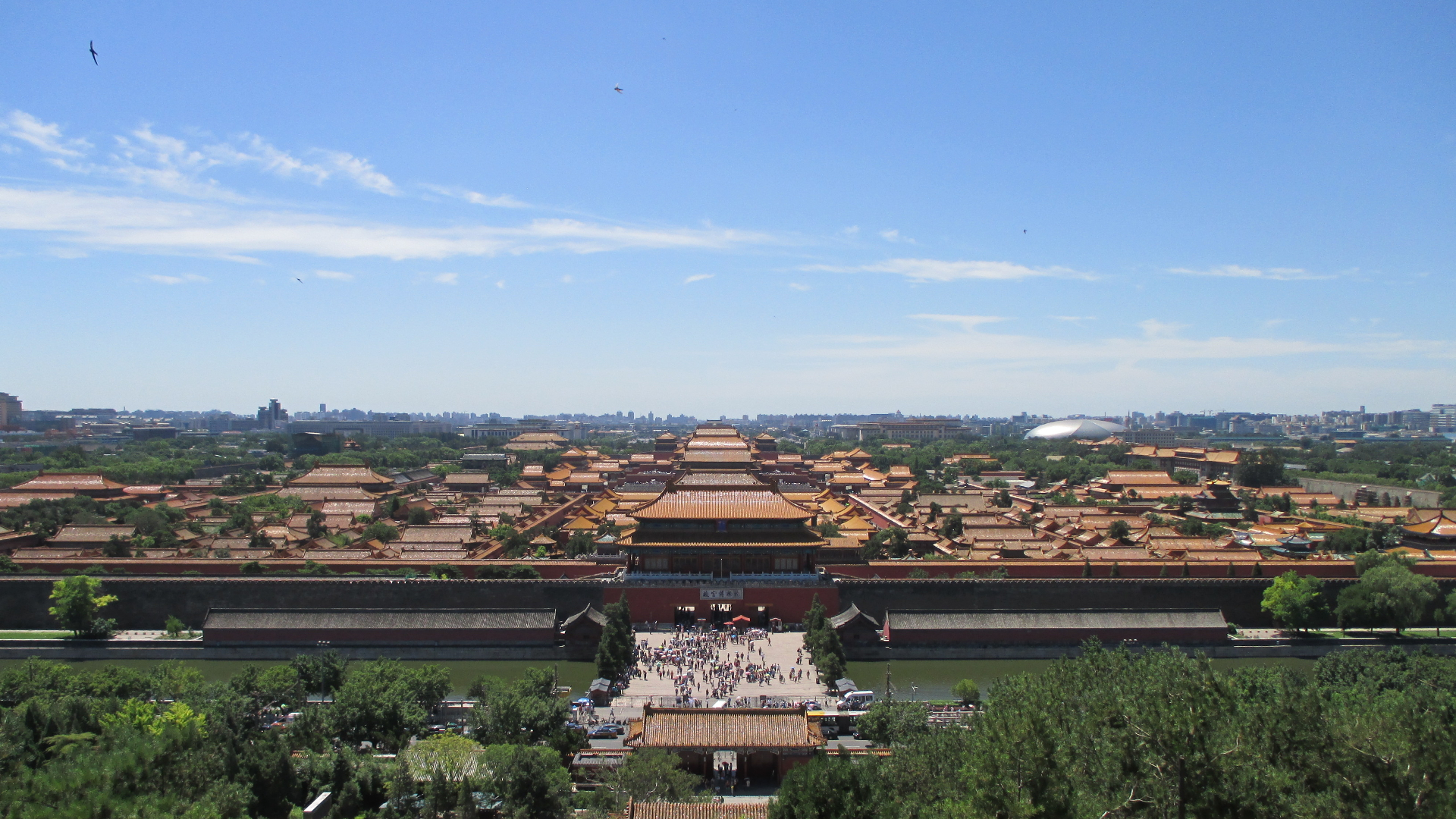
View of the Forbidden City from Jingshan Park

The Forbidden City was first built in the early-15th century as the palace of the Ming emperors of China. It is located in the centre of Beijing, China, and was the Chinese imperial palace from the early-Ming dynasty in 1420 to the end of the Qing dynasty in 1912, continuing to be home of the last emperor, Puyi, until 1924, since then it has been a museum.

Built from 1406 to 1420, the palace complex has undergone many changes. After serving as the imperial palace for some five hundred years, the Forbidden City became a museum, the Palace Museum, in 1925. In 1987, it was declared a World Heritage Site by UNESCO.

== Construction and Ming dynasty ==
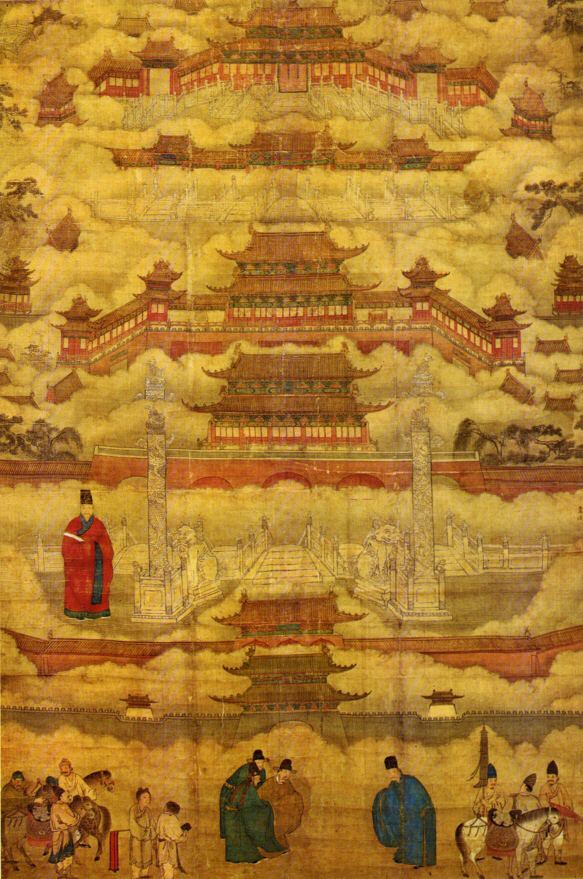
The Forbidden City as depicted in a Ming dynasty painting

The site of the Forbidden City was situated in the Imperial city during the Mongol Yuan dynasty. After the collapse of the Yuan dynasty, the Hongwu Emperor of the Ming dynasty moved the capital of China from Beijing in the north to Nanjing in the south, and in 1369 ordered that the Yuan palaces be razed. His son Zhu Di was created Prince of Yan with his seat in Beijing. In 1402, Zhu Di usurped the throne and became the Yongle Emperor. He made Beijing a secondary capital of the Ming empire, and construction began in 1406 of what would become the Forbidden City. The Forbidden City's plan was designed by many architects and designers, and then it was examined by the emperor's Ministry of Work. The chief architects and engineers include Cai Xin, Nguyen An, a Vietnamese eunuch, Kuai Xiang, Lu Xiang and others.

Construction lasted 14 years and employed the work of over 100,000 skilled artisans and up to a million labourers. The pillars of the most important halls were made of whole logs of precious Phoebe zhennan wood (Chinese: 楠木; pinyin: nánmù) found in the jungles of south-western China. Such a feat was not to be repeated in subsequent years – the great pillars seen today were rebuilt using multiple pieces of pinewood in the Qing dynasty. The grand terraces and large stone carvings were made of stone from quarries near Beijing. The larger pieces could not be transported conventionally. Instead, wells were dug along the way, and water from the wells was poured on the road in deep winter, forming a layer of ice. The stones were then dragged along the ice.

The floors of major halls were paved with "golden bricks" (Chinese: 金砖; pinyin: jīnzhuān), baked with clay from seven counties of Suzhou and Songjiang prefectures. Each batch took months to bake, resulting in smooth bricks that ring with a metallic sound. Much of the interior pavings seen today are six-century-old originals.

Soil excavated during construction of the moat was piled up to the north of the palace to create an artificial hill, the Jingshan hill.

Even before the palace was completed, Zhu Di moved to Beijing under the guise of "touring and hunting" (巡狩): the administrative centre of the empire gradually shifted from Nanjing to Beijing. When the palace was completed in 1420, Zhu Di moved there and Beijing officially became the primary capital of the empire. However, scarcely nine months after their construction, the three main halls including the throne room burnt down, and it would be 23 years before they were rebuilt.

From 1420 to 1644, the Forbidden City was the seat of the Ming dynasty. In 1601, Matteo Ricci became the first ever European to enter the City, after being invited by the Wanli Emperor in recognition of his scientific expertise. In April 1644, rebel forces led by Li Zicheng captured it, and Chongzhen, the last emperor of the Ming dynasty, hanged himself on Jingshan Hill. Li Zicheng proclaimed himself emperor of the Shun dynasty at the Hall of Military Eminence. However, he soon fled before the combined armies of former Ming general Wu Sangui and Manchu forces, setting fire to parts of the Forbidden City in the process.

== Qing dynasty ==
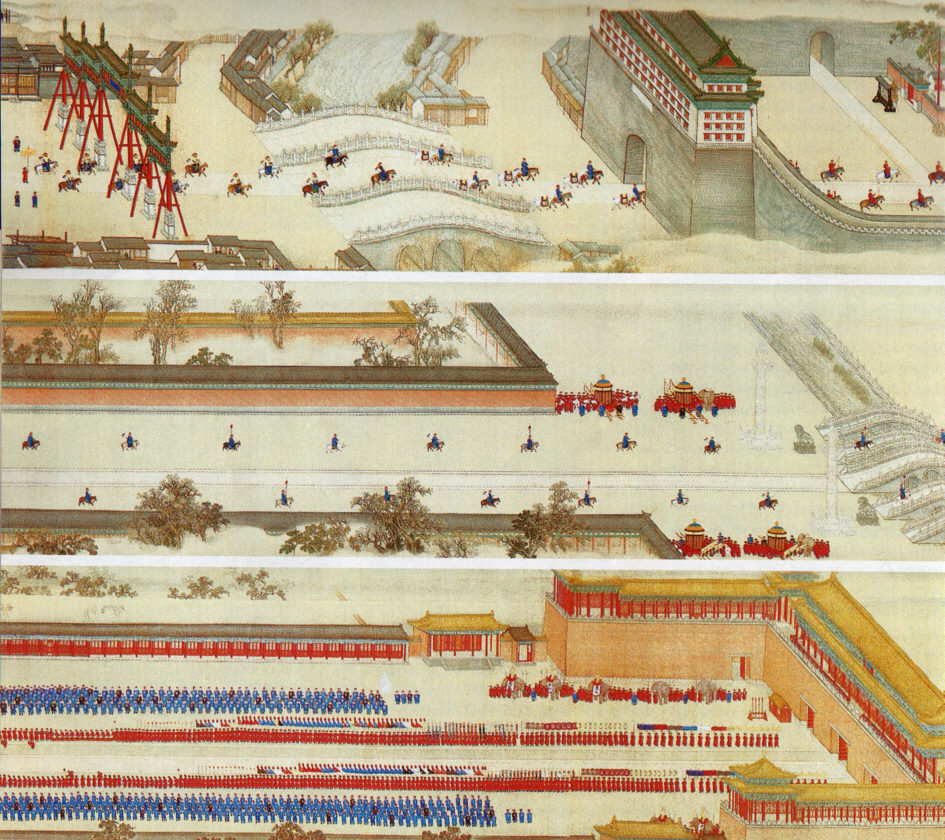
The Kangxi Emperor returning to the Forbidden City after a tour to the south.

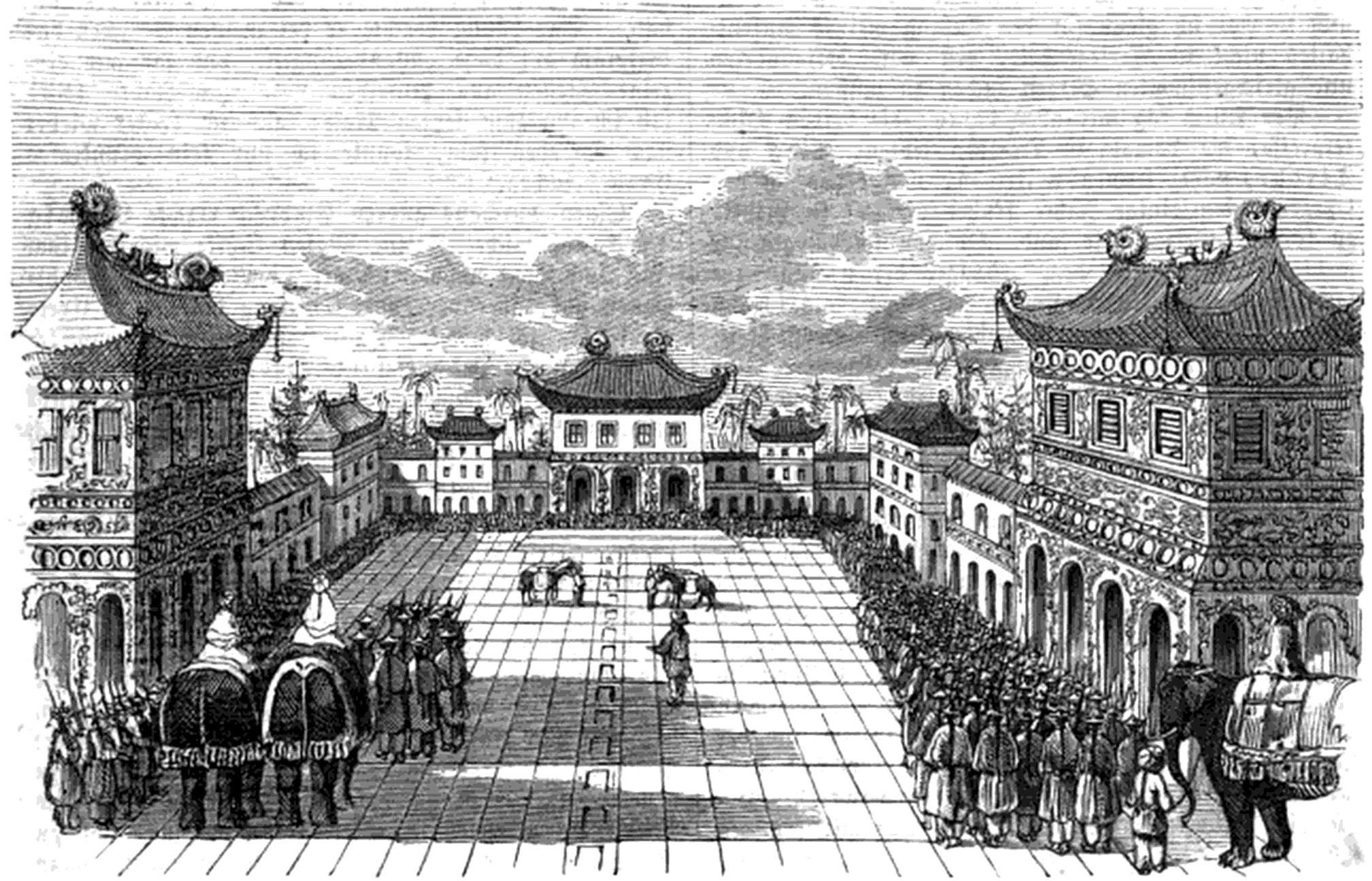
A depiction of the Forbidden City in the German book The Garden Arbor (1853)

By October 1644, the Manchus had achieved supremacy in northern China, and prince regent Dorgon proclaimed the Qing dynasty as the successor to the Ming. A ceremony was held at the Forbidden City to proclaim the young Shunzhi Emperor as ruler of all China. The Qing rulers largely maintained the Palace's Ming dynasty scheme, except for the names of some of the principal buildings. The Ming dynasty names favoured the character ji (simplified Chinese: 极; traditional Chinese: 極), meaning "supremacy" or "extremity", while the new Qing names favoured names meaning "peace" and "harmony"; for example, Huangji Dian, the "Hall of Imperial Supremacy", was changed to Taihe Dian, the "Hall of Supreme Harmony".

In addition, signs and name plates were made bilingual (Chinese and Manchu), and the main part of the empress's official bedchamber, the Hall of Earthly Tranquility, became a Shamanist shrine.

The Forbidden City thus became the power centre of the Qing dynasty. In 1860, during the Second Opium War, Anglo-French forces took control of the Forbidden City and occupied it until the end of the war. In 1900 Empress Dowager Cixi fled from the Forbidden City during the Boxer Rebellion, leaving it to be occupied by forces of the treaty powers until the following year.

After being home to twenty-four emperors, fourteen of the Ming dynasty and ten of the Qing dynasty, the Forbidden City ceased to be the political centre of China in 1912, with the abdication of Puyi, the last emperor of China. However, under an agreement signed between the Qing imperial house and the new Republic of China government, Puyi was allowed, in fact required, to live within the walls of the Forbidden City. Puyi and his family retained the use of the Inner Court, while the Outer Court was handed over to the Republican authorities. A museum was established in the Outer Court in 1914.

== After the revolution ==
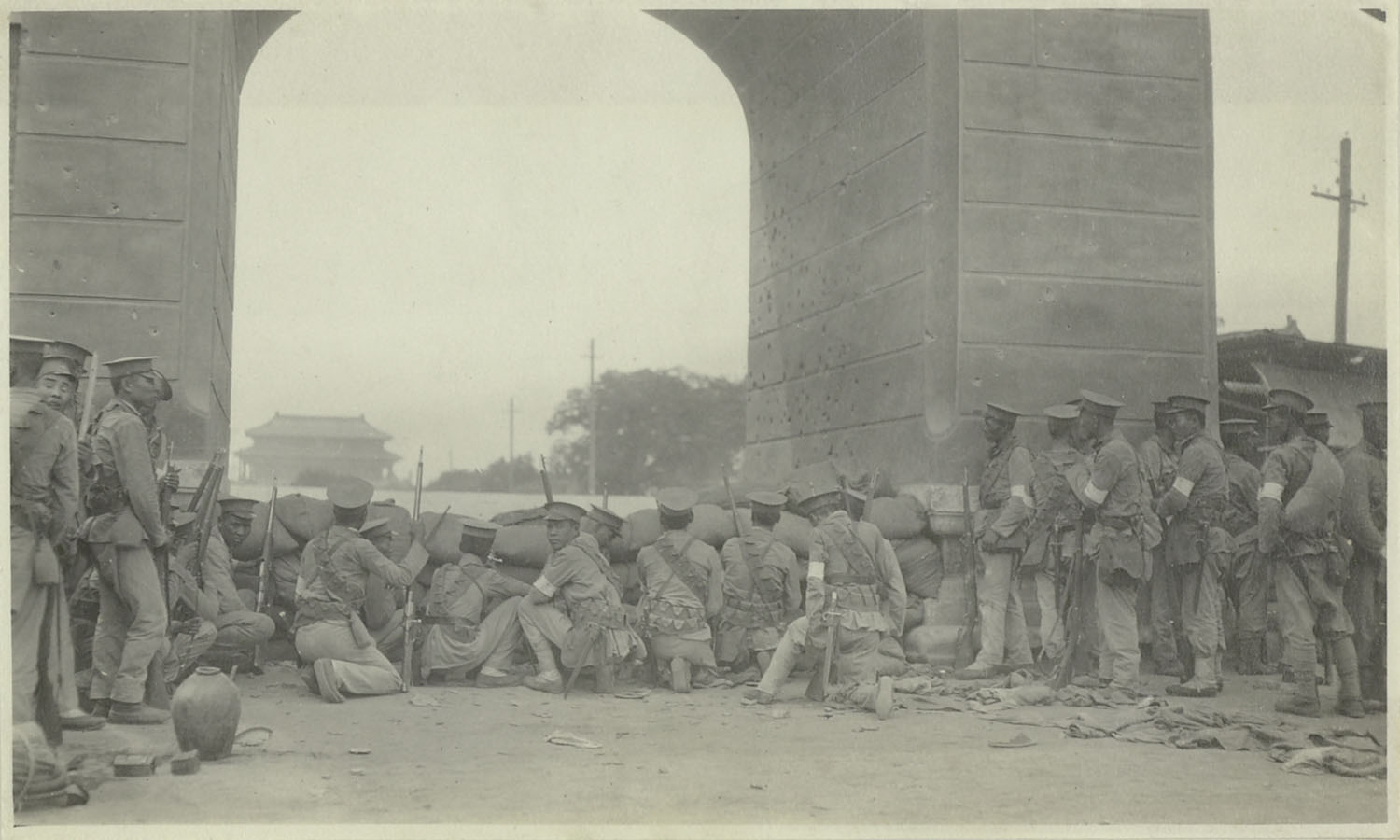
Republican troops fighting to retake the Forbidden City on July 12, 1917, after Zhang Xun's attempted imperial restoration.

Opposition to Puyi staying in the palace grew during the Beiyang government of the Republic of China.

In 1923 Reginald Johnston, Puyi's English teacher, warned Puyi about eunuchs smuggling treasures out of the palace and selling them in antique shops. Puyi ordered an audit of the palace's collections. Before that could begin, a fire consumed the gardens of the Palace of Established Happiness (建福宫) where the bulk of the Qianlong Emperor's collection of art works were stored. In his memoir, Puyi claimed the fire was started by the eunuchs to conceal their embezzlement. This fire further fuelled public sentiments against Puyi's continued occupation of the palace. The gardens were rebuilt in 2005 following a five-year-long restoration by the China Heritage Fund.

In 1924, the warlord Feng Yuxiang took control of Beijing in a coup. Denouncing the previous agreement with the Qing imperial house, Feng expelled Puyi from the palace. On October 10, 1925 (Double Ten Day), the Palace Museum was established in the Forbidden City. The large amount of treasures and curiosities housed there were gradually catalogued and put on public display.

Soon, however, the Japanese invasion of China threatened the safety of these national treasures, and they were moved out of the Forbidden City. Starting in 1933, important artifacts were packed and evacuated. They were first shipped to Nanjing and thence to Shanghai. However, the Japanese forces soon threatened Shanghai. The Executive Yuan decided to evacuate the collections to the remote west. The artifacts were split into three lots. One took the northern route towards Shaanxi. One was shipped up the Yangtze River towards Sichuan. The final lot was transported south towards Guangxi. The pace of the Japanese advance forced the artifacts to be moved quickly to escape bombing and capture, often with just hours' notice. In the end, all three collections reached the relative safety of Sichuan, where they stayed until the end of the war.

Meanwhile, the Japanese army captured the Forbidden City in Beijing, but were only able to remove a few large bronze tubs and a few pieces of cannon. Most of these were recovered after the war, in Tianjin.

At the end of World War II in 1945, the artifacts were moved back to Nanjing and Beijing. Remarkably, none were damaged or lost.

In the late 1940s, with the Kuomintang losing the Chinese Civil War, Chiang Kai-shek ordered the artifacts from the Forbidden City and the National Museum in Nanjing to be moved to Taiwan. In the event no artifacts were shipped from Beijing, but many of the best collections stored in Nanjing were shipped to Taiwan, and today form the core of the National Palace Museum in Taipei.

== Under the People's Republic of China ==
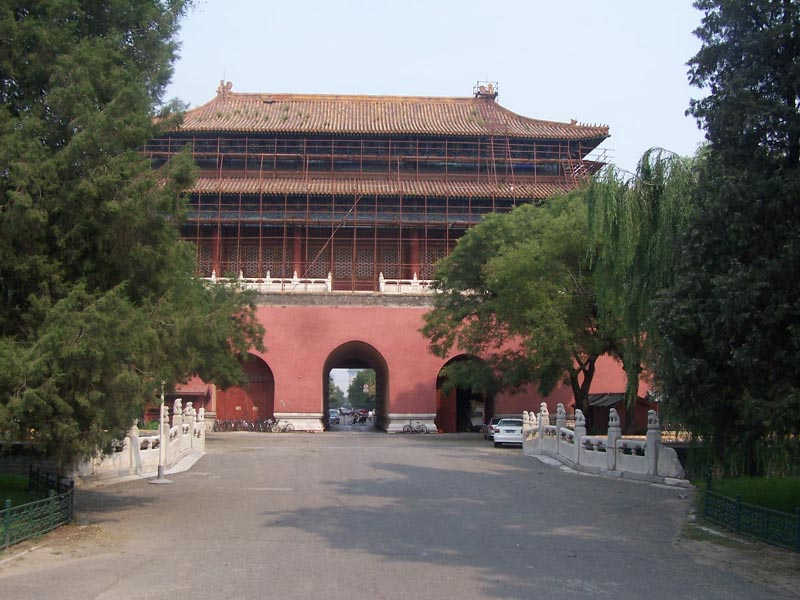
The East Glorious Gate under renovation as part of the 19-year restoration process.

In 1949, the People's Republic of China was proclaimed at Tiananmen, directly in front of the Forbidden City. Over the next two decades various proposals were made to raze or reconstruct the Forbidden City to create a public park, a transport interchange, or "places of entertainment". The site suffered some damage during this period, including the dismantling of the throne in the Hall of Middle Harmony, the removal of name tablets from several buildings and gardens, and the demolition of some minor gates and structures.

One notable proposal for the site's future was endorsed in the 1950s by Liu Shaoqi, who at the time was presumed to be Mao Zedong's chosen successor as leader of the Chinese Communist Party. He proposed that the site should be made the permanent seat of the Communist government, with all historic buildings demolished and replaced with new modernist structures, in a style similar to the Ten Great Buildings. After Liu fell out of favor with Mao, however, the plans were quietly abandoned and reframed as evidence of Liu's ambitions to supersede the Chairman's power.

The damage peaked during the Cultural Revolution. In 1966, the Hall of Worshipping Ancestors was modified and some artifacts destroyed for an exhibition of revolutionary mud sculptures. However, further destruction was prevented when Premier Zhou Enlai intervened by sending an army battalion to guard the city. These troops also prevented ransacking by the Red Guards who were swept up in the storm to demolish the "Four Olds". From 1966 to 1971, all gates to the Forbidden City were sealed, saving it from more destruction.

The Forbidden City was declared a World Heritage Site in 1987 by UNESCO as the "Imperial Palace of the Ming and Qing Dynasties", due to its significant place in the development of Chinese architecture and culture.

== Present ==
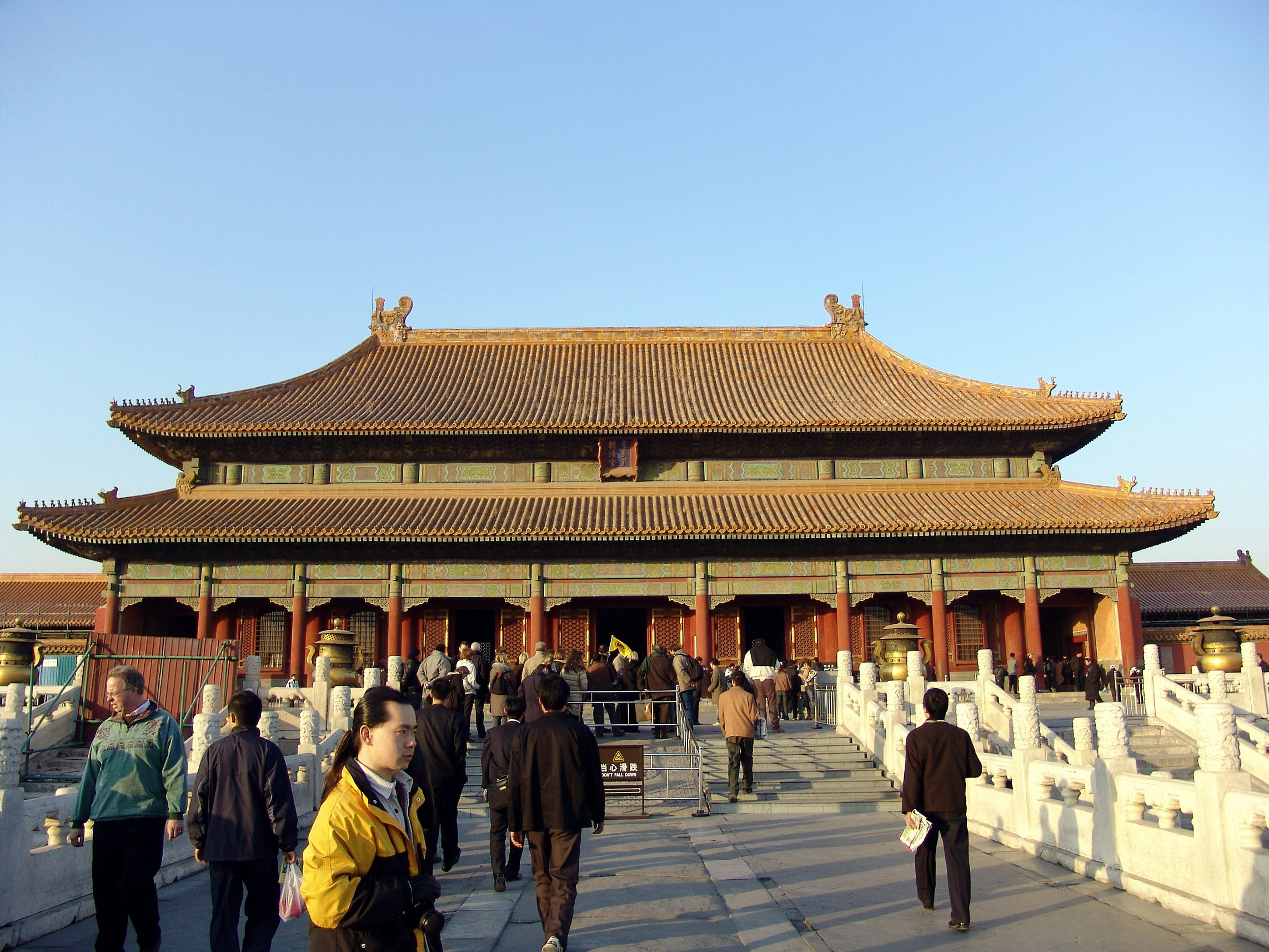
Tourists inside the Palace Museum

Currently, the Palace Museum is responsible for the preservation and restoration of the Forbidden City. Building heights around the Forbidden City are restricted. In 2005, a sixteen-year restoration project was started to repair and restore all buildings in the Forbidden City to their pre-1912 state. This is the largest restoration of the Forbidden City undertaken in two centuries, and involves progressively closing off sections of the Forbidden City for assessment, repairs, and restoration. Also as part of the project, some derelict or destroyed sections are being rebuilt. The gardens of the Palace of Establishing Prosperity, destroyed by fire in 1923, were rebuilt in 2005, but remain closed to the public. The interior was also designed in a different style, and the buildings are used by visiting dignitaries.

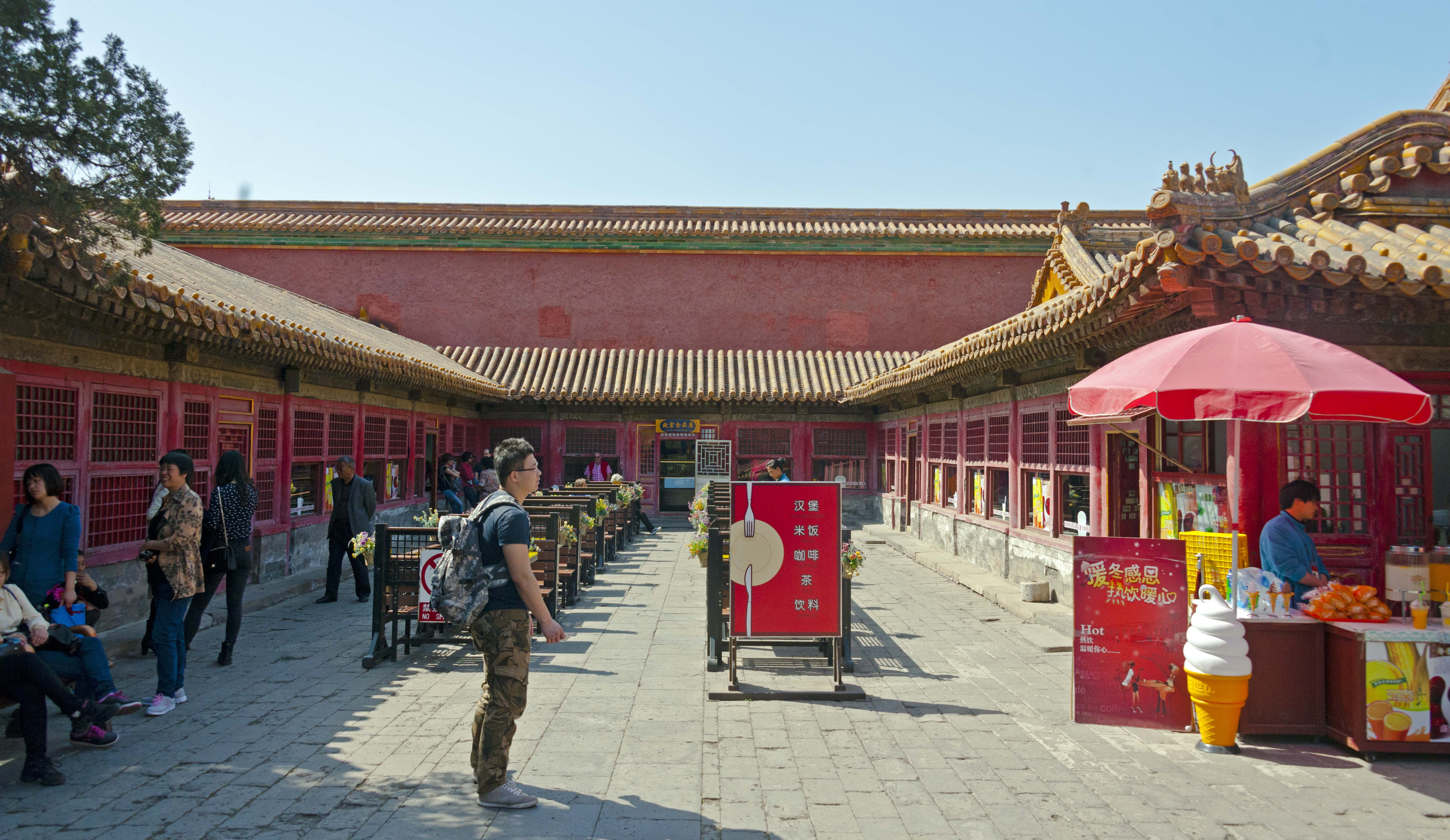
A food court in the Six Western Palaces

While effort has been made to prevent the commercialisation of the palace, a variety of commercial enterprises exist, such as souvenir shops and photography stands. These commercial enterprises often rouse controversy. A Starbucks store, which opened in 2000, sparked objections and eventually closed on July 13, 2007. Chinese media also took notice of a pair of souvenir shops that refused to admit Chinese citizens in 2006. According to the reports, the purpose was to preserve an atmosphere where foreigners could be victims of price gouging. The Palace Museum promised to investigate the matter. Some commentators, such as influential Phoenix TV host Luqiu Luwei, have further questioned the whole practice of renting out premises in the Forbidden City as retail space.

In 2005, IBM Corporation and the Palace Museum announced a joint project to build a World Wide Web-based virtual model of the Forbidden City and associated sites in Beijing. The online cultural heritage project, titled The Forbidden City: Beyond Space and Time, is presented in both English and Chinese, and provides interactive, three-dimensional, representations of Forbidden City structures and cultural artifacts. The virtual Forbidden City consists of some 800 buildings, and launched in October 2008.

On the 5 November 2024, 100 years was marked since the expulsion of the last Emperor of China, Puyi, from the palace by republican forces, led by Feng Yuxiang.

== See also ==
- History of Beijing
