= Imperial Buttery =

Imperial Buttery or Yuchashanfang (Chinese: 御茶膳房; pinyin: Yù chá shàn fáng) was a division of the Imperial Household Department in charge of cooking ordinary meals for the Qing court.
