= An Qi (poet) =

Chinese poet

An Qi (安琪), pseudonym of Huang Jiangpin (黄江嫔) (Zhangzhou 1969), is a Chinese female poet, exponent of the avant-garde known in China as the "Middle Generation," including poets born in the 1960s.

== Biography ==
Huang Jiangpin graduated from Zhangzhou Teachers College. She started working as a teacher and, after having achieved some success with the publication of her first poems, decided to become a full-time poet with the pseudonym of An Qi.

Her first collections of poems were Songs: Red Moon on Water, Running Railings, and Living in the Manner of Duras. After 1998, she emerged as a spokesperson for the "Middle Generation" and its claims that younger poets had been neglected and marginalized by the Chinese literary establishment, and co-edited with Yuan Cun and Huang Lihai Complete Works by the Middle Generation Poets. She also became the editor of the Beijing magazine Poetry Monthly.

== Poetic style ==
Her poems have been praised for their attention to the details of daily life. On the other hand, she is part of an avant-garde focusing "on how to tear down the conventional boundaries of poetic language in order to create a sense of freedom without having to make sense of the random fragments contained within the lines." The lack of structure is intentional, and reflects An Qi's fragmented view of reality.

An Qi has acknowledged in several works her debt to Ezra Pound and to the classical Chinese novel Dream of the Red Chamber by Cao Xueqin. The combination of these two sources led An Qi to a fatalistic view of human existence.
