= Plain White Banner =

Part of the Manchu Eight Banners

- Plain White Banner
- Active: 1601–1912
- Country: Later Jin; Qing dynasty
- Part of: Eight Banners
- Commander: Cuyen The Emperor

Plain White Banner

Chinese name
- Chinese: 正白旗
Transcriptions
Standard Mandarin
- Hanyu Pinyin: zhèngbáiqí

Mongolian name
- Mongolian Cyrillic: Шулуун цагаан хошуу

Manchu name
- Manchu script: ᡤᡠᠯᡠ ᡧᠠᠩᡤᡳᠶᠠᠨ ᡤᡡᠰᠠ
- Möllendorff: gulu šanggiyan gūsa

The Plain White Banner (Chinese: 正白旗; pinyin: Zhèng Bái Qí) was one of the Eight Banners of Manchu military and society during the Later Jin and Qing dynasty of China. It was one of the three "upper" banners (Plain Yellow Banner, Bordered Yellow Banner, and Plain White Banner) directly controlled by the emperor, as opposed to the other five "lower" banners. During the early years prior to Nurhaci founding the Later Jin Dynasty and Hong Taiji founding and change their empire to the Qing Dynasty, the strongest and upper three banners were the Plain Yellow, the Bordered Yellow, and the Plain Blue Banner, with Nurhaci and Hong Taiji mainly commanding the two Yellow Banners and Khan and Emperors respectively. The Hoise Niru was a military unit associated with the Plain White Banner. Nurhaci first assigned the Plain White Banner to his eldest son Cuyen. After Cuyen lost favor, it was assigned to Hong Taiji while Cuyen's son Dudu was assigned the Bordered White Banner. Hong Taiji eventually held influence on both White Banners until Nurhaci died. Nurhaci's original plans and intentions were to allow his highest consort, Abahai's three sons Ajige, Dorgon, and Dodo inherit his two Yellow Banners. Hong Taiji, recognized that the two Yellow Banners were the strongest two banners and are also considered the imperial banners of the Kahn since his father Nurhaci held it during his reign, so he switched his two White Banners for his father's two Yellow Banners to consolidate power and his ascension to the throne. He also came up with a plan along with the other princes and beiles to force Lady Abahai to an imperial burial along with the former Kahn to follow his to the grave. This was also to prevent Abahai's three teenage sons from challenging Hong Taiji's rise the throne. As the three brothers grew up, they became Hong Taiji's most trusted brothers and banner commanders of the two White Banners. After Hong Taiji's death and his 9th son Fulin's ascension to the throne with Dorgon as regent, he replaced the Plain Blue Banner with his Plain White Banner as the Emperor's Upper Three Banners. From then on, the two Yellow Banners and the Plain White Banner became the Emperor's Upper Three Banners.

== Notable members ==
- Cuyen (Manchu Prince, 1st son of Nurhaci)
- Hong Taiji (Manchu Prince, 8th son and heir of Nurhaci)
- Dorgon (Manchu Prince, 14th son of Nurhaci)
- Dodo (Manchu Prince, 15th son of Nurhaci)
- Lady Abahai (From the Ula Nara clan, consort of Nurhaci, niece to Bujantai, birth mother to Ajige, Dorgon, Dodo, the 12th, 14th, and 15th sons of Nurhaci)
- Shunzhi Emperor (9th son and heir of Hong Taiji)
- Suksaha (Manchu Official, 2nd Regent for the young Kangxi Emperor)
- Kangxi Emperor (Manchu Prince, 3rd son and heir of Shunzhi Emperor)
- Duanfang
- John Kuan
- Ronglu
- Yinchang
- Nergingge
- Empress Xiaoshurui
- Youlan (Gūwalgiya)
- Consort Donggo
- Consort Dun
- Minggatu (Mongol)
- Imperial Noble Consort Chunhui (Han)
- Shoushan (a descendant * of Yuan Chonghuan) (Han)
- Wanrong, The Empress Xiaokemin Titular Empress of the Qing, Empress of Manchukuo, Wife of Puyi, The Xuantong Emperor

== Notable clans ==
- Feimo
- Hitara
- Gūwalgiya
- Tohoro
- Su
- Cao
- Hu'erlate
- Yehe Nara
- Tubot
- Gobulo
- Ilari
- Zhu
- Chen
- Bai
- Yuan
- Wang
- Namdulu

== Bibliography ==
- Elliott, Mark C. (2001), The Manchu Way: The Eight Banners and Ethnic Identity in Late Imperial China, Stanford University Press, ISBN 9780804746847
- Wakeman, Frederic Jr. (1985), The Great Enterprise: The Manchu Reconstruction of Imperial Order in Seventeenth-century China, Berkeley: University of California Press, ISBN 0520048040
