= Oros Niru =

- Active: 17th century – 1912
- Country: Qing dynasty
- Part of: Bordered Yellow Banner

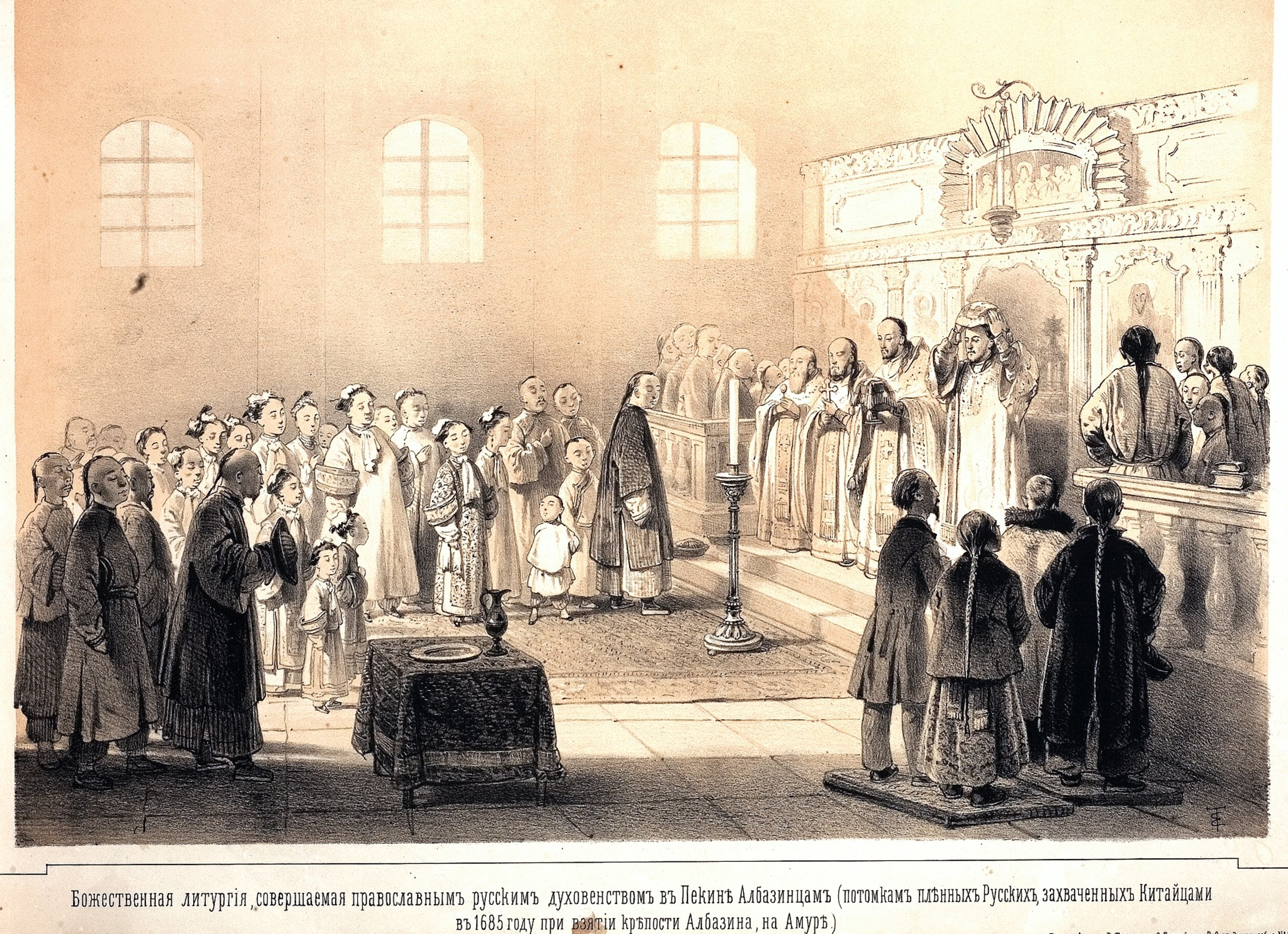
Members of Oros niru participating an Orthodox Christian liturgy.

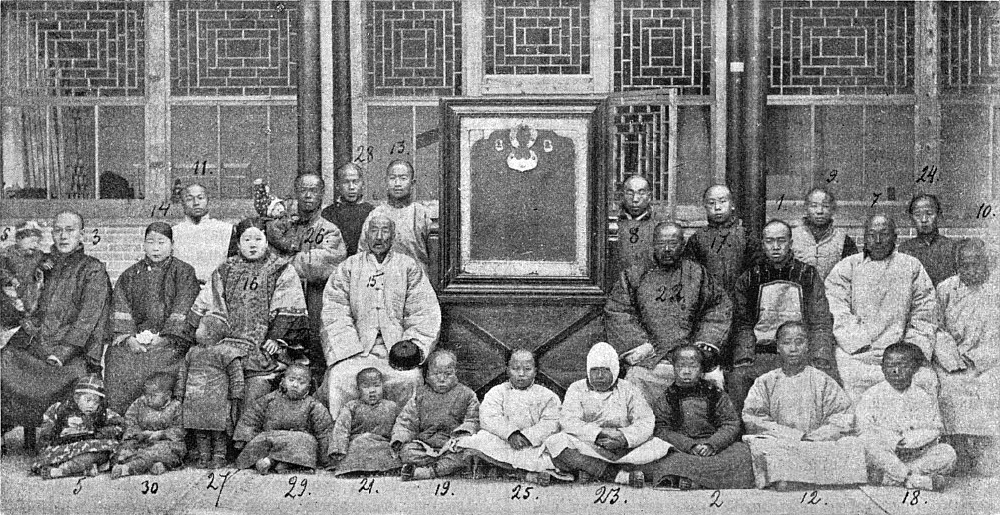
A group of Oros niru and their family members sitting around an Orthodox icon.1900.

Oros Niru (Manchu: ᠣᡵᠣᠰ
ᠨᡳᡵᡠ, Chinese: 俄羅斯佐領, lit.: "Russian Niru") was a military unit of the Qing dynasty of China. It consisted of Russian Cossacks (also known as Albazinians) that were captured during the border conflicts between the Russian Empire and Qing China. Formally, this niru was known as the 17th niru of the 4th jalan of the Manju Gusa ejen of Bordered Yellow Banner (鑲黃旗滿洲都統第四參領第十七佐領).

== Origin and History ==
All the members of Oros niru came from Russia at one point of time. There were seven Cossacks that came before the year of 1644. They were some of the earliest Russian immigrants to Manchuria. From 1640s to 1680s, the conflicts between Qing dynasty and Russian Empire around the area of Albazino (Manchus named this village Yaksa) intensified. In 1651, emperor Shunzhi ordered the offensive against the Russian Cossack stronghold in Albazino. In 1653, Russian expeditions in Siberia led by Yerofey Khabarov eventually turned into an armed conflict between Manchu and Cossacks. Cattle and horses in the hundreds were looted and 243 ethnic Daur Mongolic girls and women were raped by Russian Cossacks under Yerofey Khabarov when he invaded the Amur river basin in the 1650s. The Cossacks that were captured during these conflicts were transferred to inner parts of China. General of Sahaliyan Ula, the local Manchu military commander, decided to send them to Beijing and Shengjing. In 1668, another wave of 33 captured Russian soldiers were sent to Beijing.

The Albazin/Yakesa Campaign of between 1685 and 1687 marked an end of the Sino-Russian border conflicts. Qing government asked the Russian captives if they would stay and serve the Qing emperor. Some of them expressed their royalty to Qing dynasty, some of them did not. Those who did not wish to serve in China were sent back to Russia. Those who wish to stay were settled in Beijing. The Qing government provided these immigrants with housing and cemeteries. The government also arranged their marriages (if they did not have a spouse). The Albazinians were told to marry Solon Evenki widows by the Board of Rites. Mongol and Manchu women were married by the Albazinians. The wives married by the Albazinians were former jailed convicts.

After their first Niru Wulanggeli (this is a transcription in Chinese, his original name was lost) died, his son Luoduohun (this is also a Chinese transcription) succeeded his position. After the death of Luoduohun, members of oros niru came under the jurisdiction of the central government.

Like Cigu Niru, members of Oros niru had obstacles in terms of participating civil services. They were not allowed to be promoted beyond the 5th rank which left them with only low ranking positions to take.

The descendants of this niru identify themselves as ethnic Manchu or Russian in contemporary China. Members of Oros niru are Orthodox Christians.

In 1881, Nikolai Adoratsky who later became bishop of Orenburg, was sent to Beijing in charge of the pastoral affairs of Oros Niru. He documented the history of Oros niru in his work "The Orthodox Mission in China for the last 200 years of its existence".

== Commanders of Oros Niru ==
- Yerofey Khabarov and others (before entering Manchuria and China)

This is a list of Commanders of Oros Niru according to the "General Annals of Eight Banners" (1739)

- Wulanggeli (Cossack)
- Luoduohun (Cossack)
- Maci (Manchu from Fuca clan)
- Alingga (Manchu from Niohuru clan)
- Maci (Second time)
- Deming (Manchu from Bordered Yellow banner)
- Yintai (Manchu from Janggiya clan)
- Hadaha (Manchu from Guwalgiya clan)
- Shushan (Manchu from Niohuru clan)
- Fuliang (Vice Gusa Ejen of Bordered Yellow banner)
- Fujing (Vice Gusa ejen)
- Guangcheng (Vice Gusa ejen from Fuca clan)
- Fulungga (From Fuca clan)
- Kuilin
- Fengsenjilun

== Sources ==
- 鄂尔泰 等 (1985). 《八旗通志初集》. 东北师范大学出版社.
- 福格 (1984). 《听雨丛谈》. 中华书局. ISBN 9787101016987.
