= Imperial Household Department =

Institution of the Qing dynasty of China

- 內務府 ᡩᠣᡵᡤᡳ ᠪᠠᡳᡨᠠ ᠪᡝ ᡠᡥᡝᡵᡳ ᡴᠠᡩᠠᠯᠠᡵᠠ ᠶᠠᠮᡠᠨ

Internal affairs, domestic affairs with Tibet and Mongolia, trade, industry, and even published books overview
- Dissolved: 1912

The Imperial Household Department (traditional Chinese: 內務府; simplified Chinese: 内务府; pinyin: Nèiwùfǔ; Manchu: ᡩᠣᡵᡤᡳ
ᠪᠠᡳᡨᠠ
ᠪᡝ
ᡠᡥᡝᡵᡳ
ᡴᠠᡩᠠᠯᠠᡵᠠ
ᠶᠠᠮᡠᠨ, romanized: dorgi baita be uheri kadalara yamun) was an institution of the Qing dynasty of China. Its primary purpose was to manage the internal affairs of the Qing imperial family and the activities of the inner palace (in which tasks it largely replaced eunuchs), but it also played an important role in Qing relations with Tibet and Mongolia, engaged in trading activities (jade, ginseng, salt, furs, etc.), managed textile factories in the Jiangnan region, and even published books.

This department was also in charge of the ceremonial and spiritual activities of the Qing imperial household. These activities include the maintenance of the mausoleums of Qing emperors, polytheist worships and posthumous affairs of the royal family (the giving of temple names and posthumous names).

== Origins ==
The department was established before the Manchu-led Qing dynasty defeated the Ming dynasty in 1644, but it became mature only after 1661, following the death of the Shunzhi Emperor and the accession of his son, who reigned as the Kangxi Emperor.

In 1654, the department was temporarily substituted by the Thirteen Yamen (十三衙門) which had similar functions. In 1661, the thirteen yamen were abolished with the re-establishment of the imperial household department.

== Personnel ==
The department was manned by booi (Manchu: booi, Chinese: 包衣; pinyin: baoyi), or "bondservants", who were selected from the bondservants of the upper three banners. Booi was sometimes synonymous with booi aha, which literally means "household person", but aha usually referred to the hereditary and legally servile people who worked in fields, whereas booi usually referred to household servants who performed domestic service. The booi who operated the Imperial Household Department can be divided into roughly four groups:

- a small booi elite;
- the majority of the booi;
- indentured servants of the booi;
- the state bondservants (Manchu: sinjeku, Chinese: 辛者庫).

In total, there were three nirus of the department consist of booi. They are Cigu Niru (Chinese niru), Solho Niru (Korean niru) and Hoise Niru (Muslim niru) respectively. The demographic composition of the department was thus diverse. Manchu, Han Chinese, Korean and Muslim were cooperating to keep the department functioning. The three nirus of the imperial household department were under the inner three banners out of the Eight Banners system.

=== Various classes of Booi ===
1. booi niru a Manchu word Chinese: 包衣佐領), meaning Neiwufu Upper Three Banner's platoon leader of about 300 men.
2. booi guanlin a Manchu word Chinese: 包衣管領), meaning the manager of booi doing all the domestic duties of Neiwufu.
3. booi amban is also a Manchu word, meaning high official Chinese: 包衣大臣).
4. Estate bannerman Chinese: 庄头旗人) are those renegade Chinese who joined the Jurchen, or original civilians-soldiers working in the fields. These people were all turned into booi aha, or field bondservants.
5. sinjeku is another Manchu word Chinese: 辛者庫), the lowest class of the bondservants.

== Divisions ==
The central administration of the imperial household department was carried out by its chancery. Under the chancery, there were 7 Si (司), 3 Yuan (院) as well as numerous properties in different regions of China. One Grand chancellor of senior second rank to senior first rank was set at the top of the department. To assist the work of the Grand chancellor, there were 37 bithesi (Manchu: bithesi, Chinese: 筆帖式, Secretaries) one langzhong (senior fifth rank) and one zhushi (senior sixth rank).

Below are some of the many bureaus that were supervised by the Chancery of the Imperial Household Department (Chinese: 總管內務府衙門; pinyin: Zongguan neiwufu yamen) in Beijing:

=== Seven Si ===
The Seven Si are the main functioning body of the department. Every Si (department) has several Langzhong (郎中), Yuanwailang (員外郎) and Bithesi who were officers that supervise the works of these departments.

- Privy Purse (Chinese: 御用監; pinyin: Yuyongjian, later Guangchusi 廣儲司), in charge of imperial revenues and expenditures. At least as early as 1727, Administrator of the Canton Customs, known to Europeans as the "Hoppo", delivered substantial revenues to the Imperial Household Department through the Privy Purse.
- Department of Works (Chinese: 營造司; pinyin: Yingzaosi), in charge of maintaining and repairing buildings inside the palace.
- Department of the Imperial Hunt (Chinese: 都虞司; pinyin: Duyusi), in charge of military personnel appointment and removal, and matters related to hunting and fishing.
- Department of Ceremonies (Chinese: 掌儀司; pinyin: Zhangyisi), in charge of ceremonial affairs.
- Department of royal Ranch (Chinese: 慶豐司; pinyin: Qingfengsi), in charge of the royal ranch which provides livestock for the royal house.
- Department of Accounting (Chinese: 會計司; pinyin: Kuaijisi), in charge of real estates of the imperial household.
- Department of Prudence (Chinese: 慎刑司; pinyin: Shenxingsi), in charge of the martial law of the upper three banners which were governed by the emperor himself.

=== Three Yuan ===
- Bureau of Imperial Gardens and Parks (Chinese: 奉宸苑; pinyin: Fengchen yuan), in charge of the everyday maintenance of palace gardens.
- Imperial Armory (Chinese: 武備院; pinyin: Wubeiyuan), in charge of the manufacture and repair of palace weapons.
- Imperial Stables (Chinese: 上駟院; pinyin: Shangsiyuan), in charge of maintaining all the palace's horses

=== Other subsidiaries ===
- Imperial Buttery (Chinese: 御茶膳房; pinyin: Yuchashanfang), in charge of cooking ordinary meals for the court.
- Shenfang (Chinese: 神房; pinyin: Shenfang), in charge of rituals.
- Old Summer Palace (Chinese: 圓明園; pinyin: Yuanming Yuan), known for being burned down by Anglo-French expedition force in 1860.
- Summer Palace (Chinese: 頤和園; pinyin: Yihe Yuan), now a UNESCO World Heritage Site
- Chengde Mountain Resort (Chinese: 熱河行宮; pinyin: Rehe Xinggong), now a UNESCO World Heritage Site.
- Yonghe Temple (Chinese: 雍和宮; pinyin: Yonghe Gong)
- Bureau of internal management (Chinese: 內管領處; pinyin: Nei Guanling Chu), in charge of the maintenance of imperial warehouses.

By the nineteenth century, the Imperial Household Department managed the activities of more than 56 subagencies.
