= Kuai Xiang =

Chinese architect and engineer (1377–1451)

Kuai Xiang (Chinese: 蒯祥; pinyin: Kuǎi Xiáng; 1377–1451) was a Chinese architect and engineer widely known as designer of the Forbidden City and originator of the Xiangshan carpenters. He was born in Xukou (Xiangshan), Wu County, Suzhou, during the Ming dynasty. When the Yongle Emperor decided to transfer the capital from Nanjing to Beijing in 1407, Kuai Xiang was ordered to design and construct the Forbidden City for him.

Kuai Xiang was in his early thirties when the Emperor commissioned him to design the Forbidden City. Kuai used the Imperial Palace in Nanjing as a model. He included features of palaces built during the Tang and Song dynasties into his design. He also drew from Confucian, Taoist, and traditional astronomical systems. This took Kuai several years, and the first palace and walls of the city were completed only after 13 years.
