= New Tide =

Chinese student's magazine (1919–1922)

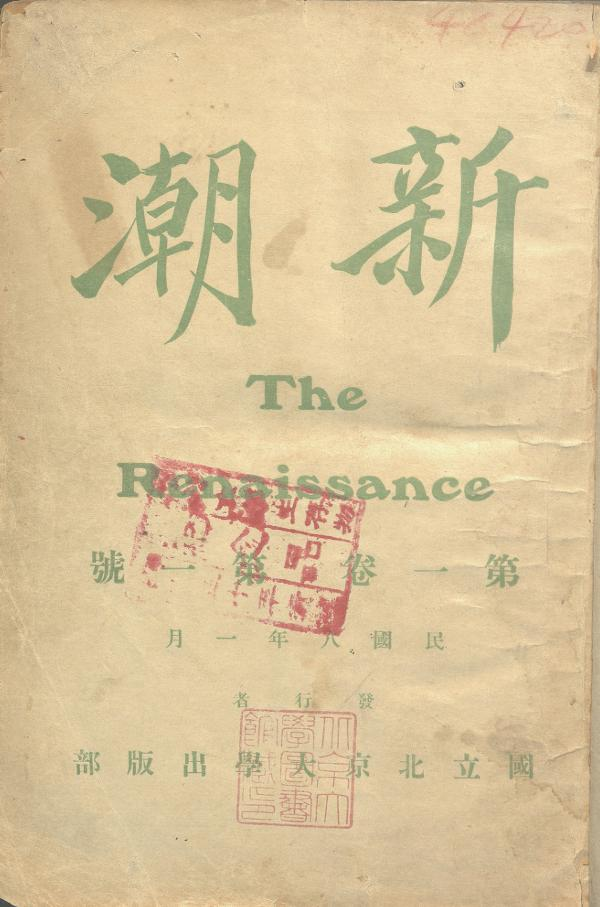
- 1st issue, 1 January 1919
- Editor: Fu Sinian; Luo Jialun; Zhou Zuoren
- Categories: Student magazine
- Frequency: Monthly
- First issue: January 1919
- Final issue: March 1922
- Company: New Tide Society (新潮社)
- Country: China
- Based in: Peking University, Peking
- Language: Chinese

New Tide (Chinese: 新潮; pinyin: Xīncháo; subtitled The Renaissance in English) was a Peking University student's magazine published from January 1919 to March 1922. It was published by the New Tide Society (新潮社; Xīncháoshè), a student group established by roommates Fu Sinian, Gu Jiegang, and Xu Yanzhi. Fu, Luo Jialun, and Zhou Zuoren served successively as the journal's editor-in-chief.

== Publication history ==
In 1917, a group of three students at Peking University in Beijing—Fu Sinian, Gu Jiegang, and Xu Yanzhi, all roommates—began to discuss the creation of a student's magazine. Xu discussed the idea further with School of Arts and Letters dean Chen Duxiu the following year, who unexpectedly offered financial support from the university on the condition that they sustained it. They founded the New Tide Society (新潮社; Xīncháoshè) to publish the magazine along with around ten other students, holding their first meeting on 13 October 1918. The scholar and reformer Hu Shih served as their faculty advisor.

Xu proposed the English title The Renaissance for the journal, while Luo Jialun suggested the Chinese name New Tide (新潮; Xīncháo), patterned after the Japanese literary magazine Shinchō ('New Tide'). The editorial staff agreed with Luo's suggested name, and added The Renaissance as its subtitle. Fu described the title New Tide as a direct translation of renaissance. This translation diverged from prior Chinese translations of the concept, such as fuxing (復興; Fùxīng) which emphasized the restoration of antiquity. The magazine's title popularized the term xinchao as a translation for the English renaissance, although some scholars such as Wang Kesi (王克私) saw it as inaccurate.

The society's second meeting in November elected officers. Fu was elected as editor-in-chief, with Luo as assistant editor and Xu as manager. At this time, the society had 21 members, all students at the university. Further prospective members were only allowed to enter the society after publishing three articles in the journal. If from another university besides Peking, they would also need to receive a nomination from two current members.

The first issue of New Tide was published on 1 January 1919. The journal published monthly issues continuously throughout the school year, with the last of the first volume published in May. The journal returned to publication with issues in October and December. In November, Fu departed Peking to study in the United Kingdom, and was succeeded as editor-in-chief by Luo. Three issues were published in 1920 (February, May, and September). In October 1920, Zhou Zuoren (the sole faculty member of the society) was elected as the new editor-in-chief. The society's activity began to slow, as many of its top editors moved overseas to continue their studies or shifted their focus to the newly-formed Chinese Literary Association. Only a single issue was published in 1921, released on 1 October. The journal's final issue appeared in March 1922.

== Contributors ==
At least twenty different writers contributed at least three articles for the magazine:

- Luo Jialun (44 articles)
- Fu Sinian (42 articles)
- Yu Pingbo (25 articles)
- Kang Baiqing (22 articles)
- Ye Shengtao (12 articles)
- Gu Jiegang (11 articles)
- Wang Jingxi (11 articles)
- Wu Kang (吳康, 10 articles)
- He Siyuan (9 articles)
- Jiang Shaoyuan (8 articles)
- Pan Jiaxun (7 articles)
- Zhou Zuoren (6 articles)
- Xu Yanzhi (6 articles)
- Chen Jia'ai (陈嘉蔼, 5 articles)
- Yang Zhensheng (5 articles)
- Tan Mingqian (5 articles)
- Sun Fuyuan (4 articles)
- Zhang Songnian (3 articles)
- Chen Dacai (陳達材, 3 articles)
- Liu Binglin (3 articles)
