= The Scarecrow (children's book) =

1923 Chinese children's book

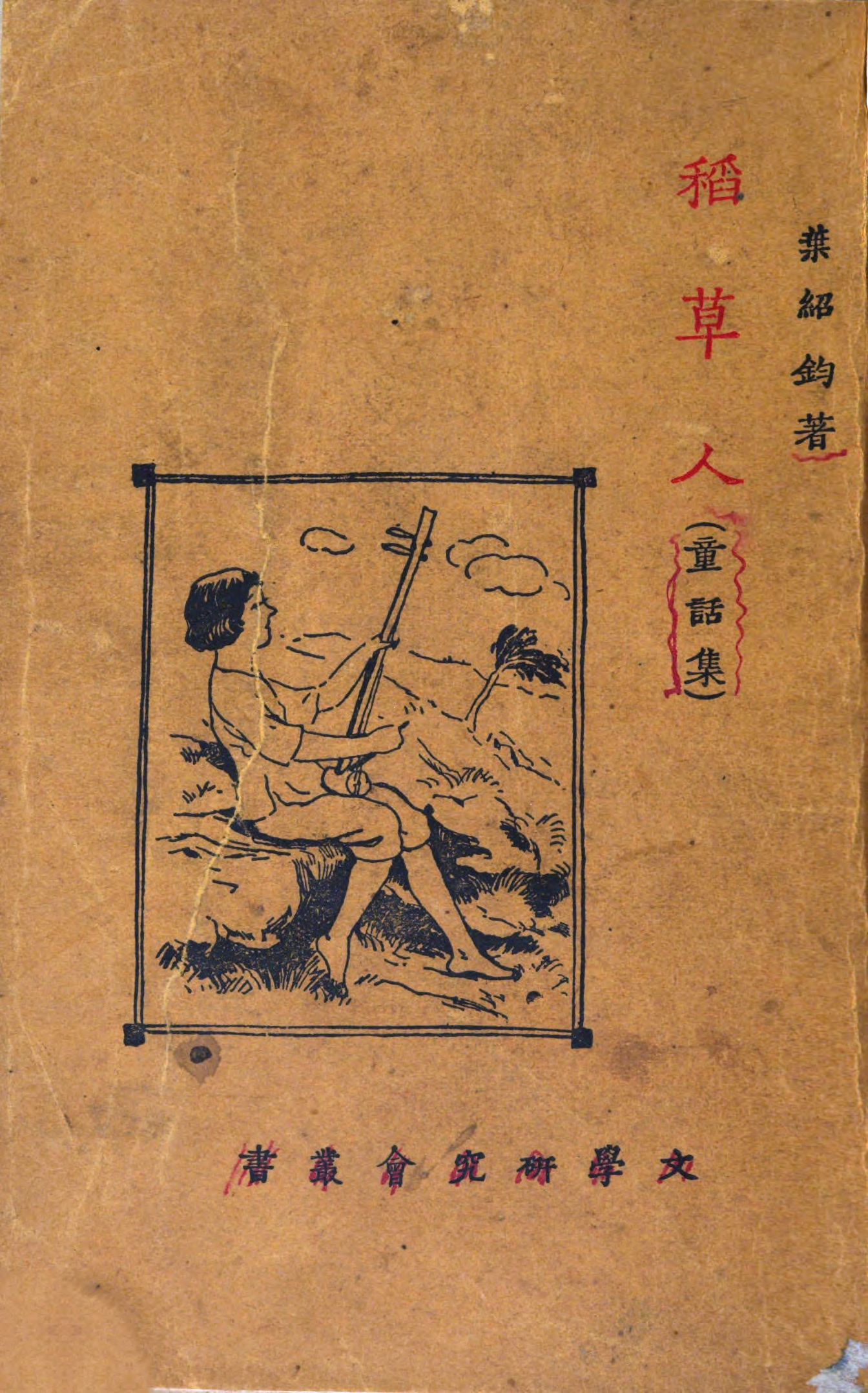
- 1923 cover
- Author: Ye Shengtao
- Publisher: Commercial Press
- Publication date: 1923
- Publication place: Republic of China

Chinese name
- Chinese: 稻草人
Transcriptions
Standard Mandarin
- Hanyu Pinyin: Dàocǎorén
- Wade–Giles: Tao^{4}ts`ao^{3}jen^{2}

The Scarecrow (Chinese: 稻草人; pinyin: Dàocǎorén) is a 1923 collection of short fairy tales for children written by Ye Shengtao. Written between 1921 and 1922, the stories contained therein reflect the changing treatment of children in China. They vary between idealistic and realistic, with some stories idealizing childhood innocence and others decrying the social ills of the Republic of China. The collection has been considered the first major work of children's literature in modern China.

== Summary ==
The Scarecrow consists of 23 short fairy tales, written between 1921 and 1922. It opens with "Little White Boat", in which two children take a beautiful white boat along a stream. Losing their way in a storm, they encounter an old man who promises to send them home if they can answer three questions: "Why do birds sing?", "Why do flowers have fragrance?", and "Why did the little white boat let you ride in it?" The children answer correctly, and are taken home.

Another story, "The Seed", expands upon the idea of flowers. It opens with a description of a seed, promised to be the most beautiful of all. It is acquired by a king, a rich man, a shopkeeper and a soldier, each of whom discards it soon after. Falling amidst a field of wheat, it is encountered by a peasant, who treats it with care. Soon, the seed blooms, bringing with it a great fragrance that blesses the peasant and his village. A third story, "The Thrush", follows a thrush that lives in a golden cage and sings only for others. Escaping when the cage door is left open, the bird sees the misery of peasants and labourers. Considering the suffering, the thrush learns a song of sadness for himself. His song is well received by the peasants, who cry "What a lovely song, what a lovely little thrush."

The final story, "The Scarecrow", follows a living scarecrow that comes face-to-face with the challenges experienced with three women: an old woman whose chance to break free of debt is endangered by swarms of insects devouring her crops, a fisherwoman forced to abandon her ailing son because she is the family's sole breadwinner, and a woman who seeks to kill herself to avoid being sold by her abusive husband. In all cases, the scarecrow waves his fan to prevent tragedy, but is unsuccessful.

== Background and writing ==
For centuries, literature has been used in China as an educational primer for children. Following the May 4th Movement, efforts were made to create a "new culture". This included a new government policy promoting vernacular Chinese as a language of instruction, as well as changing mores that recognized the agency of children, the idea of using age as a measure of development, as well as the implementation of student-centered learning. Writers began working on stories for children, and several magazines were dedicated to them.

The fairy tales in The Scarecrow were written by Ye Shengtao, who had taught at an elementary school in Suzhou, Jiangsu, before becoming a middle-school teacher. At the same time, he was an active editor of children's magazines. A proponent of the philosophy "literature for life", Ye believed that observation was paramount for a good writer. He later recalled that his stories had all been rooted in elements he observed in his everyday life.

== Analysis ==
Writing in Chinese Social Sciences Today, Shang Jinlin of Peking University divides the stories in The Scarecrow into two categories: "Beautiful Fairy Tales" of idealized childhood dreams (such as "Little White Boat") and stories depicting the "Sorrow of Adults" (such as "A Happy Man" and "The Scarecrow") that criticize real-world situations. In her study of children's literature in China, Mary Ann Farquhar likewise notes a tendency for the stories to "swing between the light and the dark, the dream and the reality." The scholar of Chinese literature Jing Feng identified this shift as a transition from idealism to melancholy.

"Little White Boat" has been read as idealizing innocence, with Farquhar describing it as emphasizing the "special world of children" that had been advanced by Lu Xun and Zhou Zuoren in essays. Farquhar finds similarities in "The Thrush" and Hans Christian Andersen's "The Nightingale", both of which follow a bird in a gilded cage and his song; Andersen's writing had been translated extensively into Chinese.

The focus on women in "The Scarecrow" continued a trend in Ye Shengtao's earlier writing. He had written an essay, "The Question of Women's Dignity", in 1919 and challenged the oppression of peasant women. Similarly, each woman's experience in "The Scarecrow" reflected contemporary customs that were deemed detrimental to women, including the requirement for widows to pay funerary costs as well as the practice of wife selling. In a 1982 retrospective, Ye Shengtao described the scarecrow as a representation of Republican-era intellectuals "who were conscientious, alert, and sympathetic, yet could not find a way to help to change the cruel reality."

The children's literature scholar Lijun Bi of Monash University sees a parallel between "The Scarecrow" and Alexander Pushkin's The Tale of the Fisherman and the Fish (1833); where Pushkin's story sees the sea become increasingly turbulent in response to the fisherman's wishes, "The Scarecrow" depicts the night becoming darker as each new tragedy emerges. Linda Wong in The Wildean, meanwhile, sees strong similarities between the story and Oscar Wilde's "The Happy Prince", a tale of a statue who gives away its own beauty to help the poor. The titular scarecrow is granted particular characteristics through metaphor, being juxtaposed with humanity as not a creation of God but of peasants while also being described as more diligent than a buffalo or dog.

== Reception and legacy ==
The Scarecrow was published by the Commercial Press in 1923. At the time of publication, the critic Zhu Ziqing praised Ye Shengtao's work for its social realism, later calling it a founding stone for children's literature in China. In 1961, an English-language translation was published by the Foreign Languages Press.

Bi describes The Scarecrow as the first major work of children's literature in modern China, while You Chengcheng of the University of Macau calls it the first modern collection of Chinese fairy tales." Reviewing the state of scholarship on children's literature in China, Shih-Wen Sue Chen writes that the book has often been taken as a starting point for the genre in China, while others have pointed to Sun Yuxiu's short story "A Kingdom Without Cats" (1908) as well as pre-modern readings for children.

Ye Shengtao is widely considered one of the pioneers of children's literature in China, together with Bing Xin, who serialized her Letters to Young Readers between 1923 and 1926. Other attempts at fairy tales followed. Ye Shengtao published another collection, The Stone Figure of an Ancient Hero, in 1931. Likewise, Zhang Tianyi published "Big Lin and Little Lin" in 1932.

== Works cited ==
- Bi, Lijun (2013). "China's Patriotic Exposé: Ye Shengtao's Fairytale, Daocao ren [Scarecrow]". Bookbird. 51 (2): 32–38. doi:10.1353/bkb.2013.0038.
- Bi, Lijun; Fang, Xiangshu (2013). "Childhoods: Childhoods in Chinese Children's Texts–Continuous Reconfiguration for Political Needs". In Wu, Yan; Mallan, Kerry; McGillis, Roderick (eds.). (Re)imagining the World: Children's Literature's Response to Changing Times. Berlin: Springer. pp. 55–68. doi:10.1007/978-3-642-36760-1. ISBN 978-3-642-36759-5.
- Chen, Minjie (2016). The Sino-Japanese War and Youth Literature: Friends and Foes on the Battlefield. London and New York: Routledge. ISBN 978-1-317-50881-6.
- Chen, Shih-Wen Sue (2019). Children's Literature and Transnational Knowledge in Modern China: Education, Religion, and Childhood. London: Palgrave Macmillan. ISBN 978-981-13-6082-4.
- Farquhar, Mary Ann (1999). Children's Literature in China: From Lu Xun to Mao Zedong. London and New York: Routledge. ISBN 978-1-317-47507-1.
- Huang, Qingyun (1986). "A Survey of Children's Literature in China". The Lion and the Unicorn. 10: 23–25. doi:10.1353/uni.0.0159.
- Louie, Belinda Yue-Ying; Louie, Douglas H. (2002). "Children's Literature in the People's Republic of China: Its Purposes and Genres". In Li, Wenling; Gaffney, Janet S.; Packard, Jerome L. (eds.). Chinese Children's Reading Acquisition: Theoretical and Pedagogical Issues. Berlin: Springer. pp. 175–193. doi:10.1007/978-1-4615-0859-5. ISBN 978-0-7923-7543-2.
- Shang, Jinlin (12 June 2023). "Ye Shengtao Made Chinese Fairy Tales from a Wilderness". Chinese Social Sciences Today. Archived from the original on 29 December 2024.
- Wong, Linda (2004). "Oscar Wilde's Literary Influence in Modern China". The Wildean (24): 46–58. JSTOR 45269230.
- Xu, Xu (2013). "Translation, Hybridization, and Modernization: John Dewey and Children's Literature in Early Twentieth Century China". Children's Literature in Education. 44 (3): 222–237. doi:10.1007/s10583-012-9192-1.
- Ye, Shengtao (1961). The Scarecrow: A Collection of Stories for Children. Beijing: Foreign Languages Press. ISBN 978-0-8351-1739-5.
- You, Chengcheng (2017). "Ghostly Vestiges of Strange Tales: Horror, History and the Haunted Chinese Child". In Jackson, Anna (ed.). New Directions in Children's Gothic: Debatable Lands. London and New York: Routledge. pp. 81–101. ISBN 978-1-138-90547-4.
