= Nanjing Cao Xueqin Memorial Museum =

Memorial hall in Nanjing, China

Nanjing Cao Xueqin Memorial Hall is a memorial hall located in Gulou District, Nanjing南京. It commemorates the writer Cao Xueqin曹雪芹. The memorial hall is a retro-style building. In the middle of the hall is a statue of Cao Xueqin more than two meters high. The museum contains various versions of the ancient version of the Dream of the Red Chamber 红楼梦 and the director of the Jiangsu Academy of Traditional Chinese Painting. Three sets of "Jinling Twelve Hairpins" paintings created by Zhao Xucheng and others. At the third annual meeting of Dream of Red Mansions held in Yangzhou in November 1985, Kuang Yaming, honorary president of the Society of Dreams of Red Mansions, and scholar Zhou Ruchang, and others called for the establishment of the Cao Xueqin Memorial Hall in Jiangning Weaving Mansion, which was later changed to Wulongtan in Caozhai Bieyuan due to land approval issues. Suiyuan in the park was built and officially opened in September 1997.

== History ==
Cao Xueqin grew up in Nanjing as a child and moved to the western suburbs of Beijing in his later years. He created many literary and artistic works. His nicknames "Jinling" and "Stone" in "A Dream of Red Mansions" appeared in Nanjing, which shows that Nanjing has a special relationship with Cao Xueqin and "A Dream of Red Mansions". The local government built a memorial hall in Nanjing, Xueqin's hometown.

- On November 15, 1983, the "Symposium to Commemorate the 220th Anniversary of Cao Xueqin's Death" was held in Nanjing. The famous red scholar Zhou Ruchang周汝昌 hoped to establish the Cao Xueqin 曹雪芹 memorial hall in Jiangning Weaving Mansion in "The Voice of Youth".
- On 12th, 1985, the relevant persons at the meeting including Mr.Zhou Ruchang signed the "Proposal for the Statue of Cao Xueqin 曹雪芹 and Establishing a Memorial Hall in Nanjing" and sent a letter to the handling unit for review. Due to land approval issues, the final agreement chose the Cao Zhai Bieyuan Wulongtan Park曹宅别院五龙潭公园. Built with the park.
- In October 1992, the Red Chamber Dream Society of Jiangsu Province江苏省 and Wulongtan Park Management Office jointly carried out the construction of the bronze statue of Cao Xueqin曹雪芹. Among them, the Wulongtan Park includes the Cao Xueqin Memorial Hall and the "Hongxue Grand View Garden" of the Dream of Red Mansions Museum.
- In September 1997, with the strong support of the provincial and municipal governments and people from all walks of life, the initially completed Cao Xueqin Memorial Hall was officially opened to the public.

== Current situation ==
Nanjing Cao Xueqin Memorial Museum 南京曹雪芹纪念馆 is located at the foot of Nangui Mountain in Wulongtan. There is a "stone bridge" in front of the museum. The bronze statue of Cao Xueqin曹雪芹 and the words "Hongxue Grand View Garden" are placed in the center. It is written by the famous red scholar Zhou Ruchang. Carved in Shandong granite, wearing a robe, holding a manuscript, folding his legs, sitting on a huge stone, his eyes are focused on thinking, and his spirit is spacious. The hall of the memorial hall has six large golden characters "Cao Xueqin Memorial Hall" and a couple of couplets for the famous artist Cai Ruohong to write the figure of the calligrapher Liu Junchuan, expounding the rise and fall of the past, enough to describe the situation at that time in writing, all words are blood, ten Years of hard work are unusual, summarizing Cao Xueqin's creative background and life hardships. On the six large pillars in front of the hall are three pairs of couplets written by the representatives of the new red studies Hu Shi胡适， Yu Pingbo俞平伯, and the representative of contemporary red studies Zhou Ruchang周汝昌. The Wulongtan area has also attracted attention due to the "Red Mansion Culture".

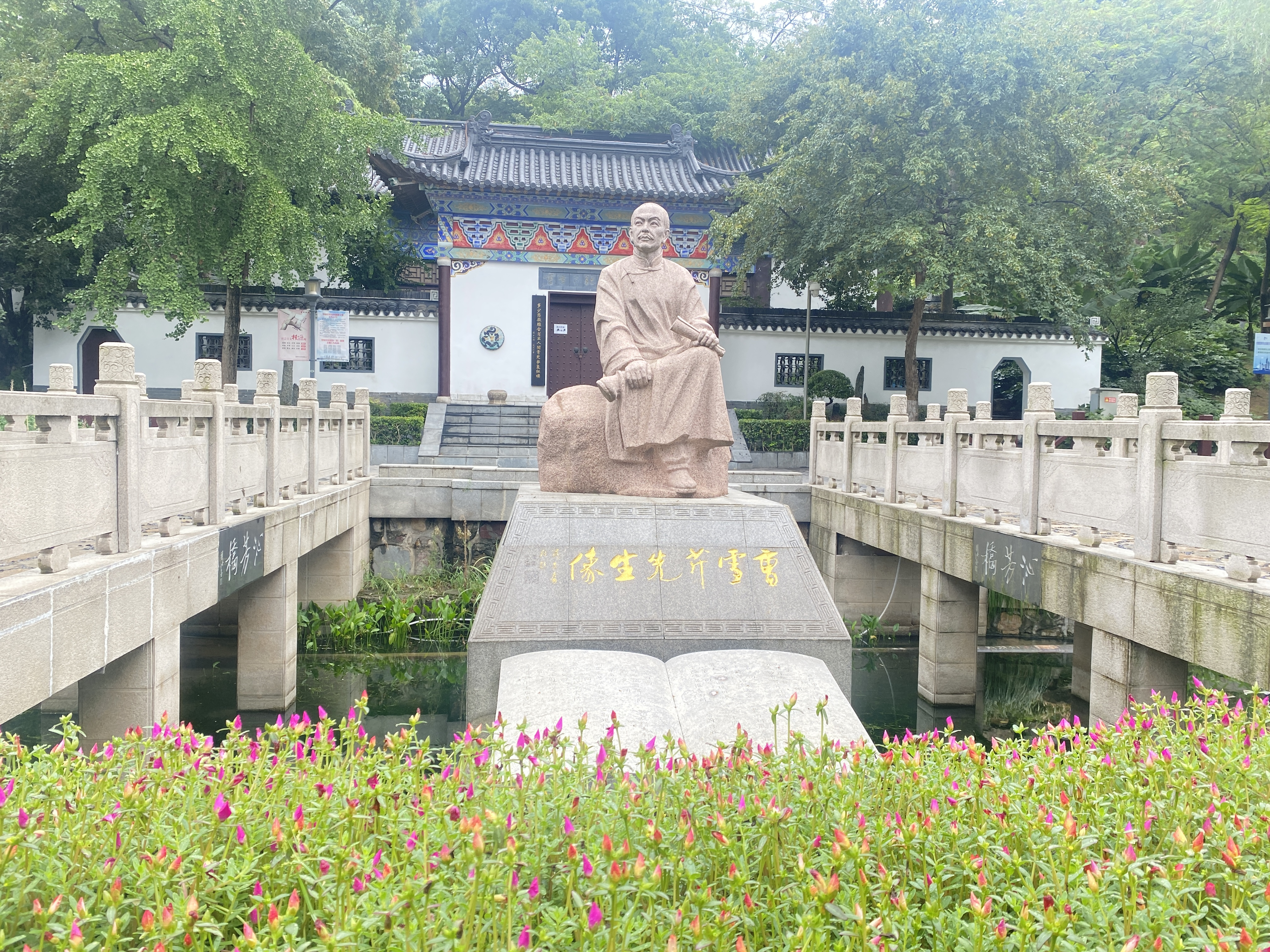
南京曹雪芹紀念館一景
