= Yu Pingbo =

Chinese historian

- Chinese: 俞平伯
Transcriptions
Standard Mandarin
- Hanyu Pinyin: Yú Píngbó
- Wade–Giles: Yü P'ing-po

Yu Mingheng
- Traditional Chinese: 俞銘衡
- Simplified Chinese: 俞铭衡
Transcriptions
Standard Mandarin
- Hanyu Pinyin: Yú Mínghéng

Yu Pingbo (Chinese: 俞平伯; Wade–Giles: Yü P'ing-po; January 8, 1900 – October 15, 1990), original name Yu Mingheng (俞銘衡) and courtesy name Pingbo (平伯), was a Chinese essayist, poet, historian, redologist, and literary critic.

== Early life ==
Yu Pingbo's ancestry can be traced to Deqing, Zhejiang. His pet name as a child was Sengbao (僧寶). He was a descendant of Yu Yue, a renowned scholar during the late Qing period, and Yu Pingbo was trained in the Chinese classics from an early age. In 1915, he qualified by examination for a preparatory course at Peking University, where he became one of Hu Shih's most prominent students. In 1917, he married Xu Baoxun (許寶馴), a gifted female scholar from Hangzhou, and then commenced composing melodies for Kunqu operas. Meanwhile, he temporarily immersed himself in the New Culture Movement, and in 1918 his first New Culture period poem Spring Waters (春水 Chūnshuĭ) was published alongside Lu Xun's "Diary of a Madman" in La Jeunesse, becoming one of the pioneering compositions to be written in contemporary Chinese vernacular. That same year, he established with classmates Fu Sinian, Luo Jialun and others the New Wave Society. Other intellectual friends or writers included Zhu Ziqing, Feng Youlan, and Ye Shengtao. He then went on to publish such compositions as the poem Winter's Night (冬夜 Dōngyè). Yu Pingbo graduated from Peking University in December, 1919. After graduation, Yu took a brief trip to Europe, and in 1922 spent an equally brief period in the United States, but found neither place attractive.

== Career during Republican China ==
In 1923, Yu published Debating Dream of the Red Chamber (紅樓夢辨 Hónglóumèng Biàn), giving evidence for his claim that only the first eighty chapters of the original Dream of the Red Chamber had been authored by Cao Xueqin, the later forty chapters being penned by Gao E. He thereby came to be known, along with Hu Shih, for establishing a new field in redological studies. These studies were not only important in developing an understanding of the text and its complexities, but in advancing the New Culture Movement's nationalistic project of using scientific methodology to replace old Chinese culture with a westernized version.

In 1925 he took up post as a lecturer at Yenching University. In 1928 he went to Tsinghua University. In 1935, he founded the Tsinghua Valley Music Society (清華谷音社 Qinghuá Gŭyīnshè) Tsinghua to popularise his Kunqu compositions. In 1946, he transferred to Peking University for the post of professor. In 1935, he entered the Classical Literature Research Unit (古典文學研究室 Gŭdiăn Wénxué Yánjiūshì) at the Literary Research Institute (文學研究所 Wénxué Yánjiūsuŏ) of the Chinese Academy of Sciences, there revising his old publication Discussing Dream of the Red Chamber and redistributing it under the title Study of the Dream of the Red Chamber (紅樓夢研究 Hónglóumèng Yánjiū).

== People's Republic of China ==
In September 1954, two recent graduates Li Xifan and Lan Ling (蓝翎) published a critique of an article about Dream of the Red Chamber written by Yu. On October 10, their critique of Yu's Study of the Dream of the Red Chamber was published in the major national newspaper Guangming Daily, which criticizes the book for lacking "scientific analysis" and for failing to notice the "great anti-feudal trend" represented in the classical novel. Li and Lan's critiques caught the attention of Mao Zedong, who seized the opportunity to launch an attack against Yu, and ultimately, the idealism espoused by the scholar Hu Shih. Mao wrote a letter on 16 October praising Li and Lan's courage for attacking an established authority. The letter was circulated within China's top leadership, and Chinese media began a national campaign praising the "nobodies" such as Li and Lan while criticizing bourgeois "big wigs" such as Yu.

During the Cultural Revolution, Yu was persecuted and sent to a May Seventh Cadre School in Xi County, Henan for manual labour. He was rehabilitated after Mao's death in 1976. On 15 October 1990, at ninety years of age, he died at his home in Beijing.
