= Xifan =

Xifan is the atonal pinyin romanization of various Chinese names and words.

It may refer to:

== People ==
- Feng Xifan (Chinese: 馮錫範; fl. 17th century), Kingdom of Tungning official
- Li Xifan (Chinese: 李希凡; 1927–2018), Chinese literary critic
- Ma Xifan (Chinese: 馬希範; 899–947), Prince of Ma Chu
- Ou Xifan (Chinese: 歐希範), Northern Song dynasty robber

== Other uses ==
- Xifan or Hsi-fan (西番, lit. "The Western Barbarians"), a Chinese racial slur variously used for
  - Native peoples west of Gansu under the Tang
  - The Qiang and other Qiangic speakers
  - Their homelands west of Sichuan and Yunnan
  - The Tibetans
  - Tibet, particularly eastern Tibet
- xifan (稀饭), a Chinese synonym for congee
