= Redology =

Academic study of Cao Xueqin's Dream of the Red Chamber

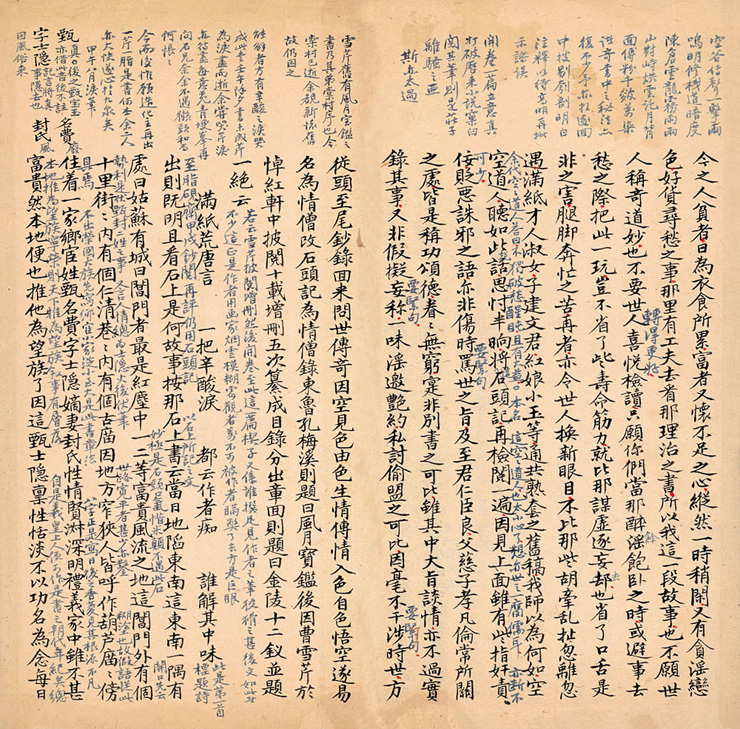
A page from the 1759 "Jimao manuscript" of the novel

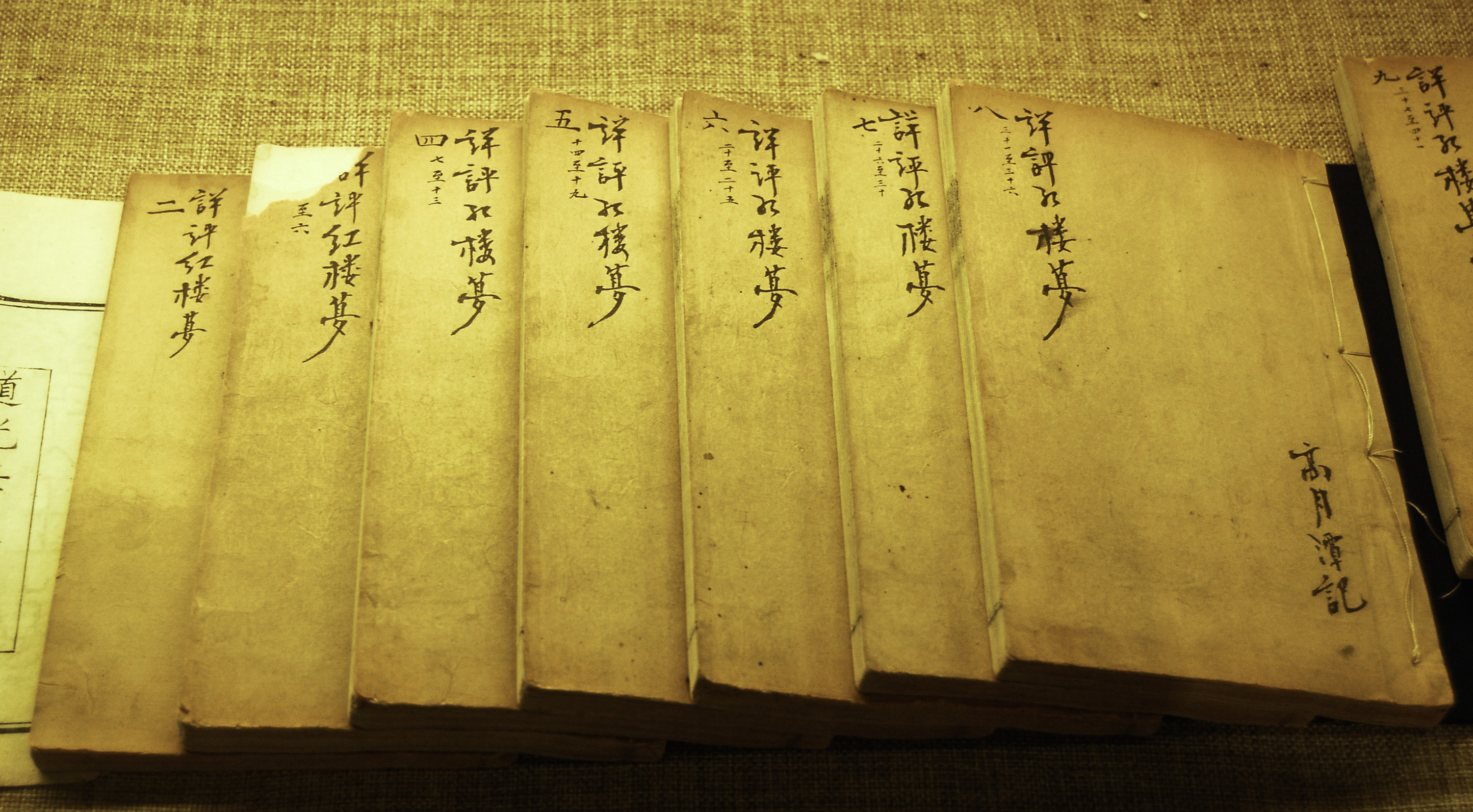
A collection of commentaries on the Dream of the Red Chamber by Gao Yuetan

Redology (simplified Chinese: 红学; traditional Chinese: 紅學; pinyin: hóng xué) is the academic study of Cao Xueqin's Dream of the Red Chamber, one of the Four Great Classical Novels of China. There are numerous researchers in this field; most can be divided into four general groups: the first group are the commentators, such as Zhou Chun, Xu Fengyi, Chen Yupi, and others; the second group is the index group, which includes Wang Mengruan and Cai Yuanpei; the third group are the textual critics, including Hu Shih and Yu Pingbo; the final group are the literary critics, including Zhou Ruchang and Li Xifan.

== History ==
A 1976 essay by Joey Bonner split the Chinese critical reception of the novel into five phases:

- Pre-1791
  Commentators on the pre-publication manuscripts, such as Rouge Inkstone and Odd Tablet, who mainly provide literary analysis of the first 80 chapters.
  1791–1900
  Post-publication questions over authorship of the addendum, speculation upon esoteric aspects of the book. After 1875 using the term "Redology" for the studies.
  1900–1922
  Political interpretations.
  1922–1953
  "New Redology" led by Hu Shih, approach questions of textual authenticity, documentation, dating, and a strong autobiographical focus. The labelling of previous periods as "Old Redology".
  1954–current [1975]
  Marxist literary criticism, the book seen as a criticism of society's failures. Li Xifan's criticism of both Old Redology and Neo-Redologists such as Hu Shih and Yu Pingbo.

== Academic research institutes ==
There are many Redology academic institutions, especially university affiliated ones:

- The Society of the Dream of the Red Chamber (中国红楼梦学会) in Beijing
- The Cao Xueqin Society of Beijing (北京曹雪芹学会) in Beijing
- The Cao Xueqin Center for Aesthetics and Art (北京大学曹雪芹美学艺术研究中心) at Peking University, Beijing
- The Weiming Society for Hongloumeng Studies at Peking University, Beijing
- International Research Center of the Dream of the Red Chamber (RDRC), National Dong Hwa University College of Humanities and Social Sciences, Taiwan
- Dream of the Red Chamber Research Centre, University of Malaya, Malaysia
