= Ni Huanzhi =

- Cover of the novel Ni Huanzhi
- Author: Ye Shengtao
- Original title: 倪煥之
- Language: Chinese
- Published: 1928-1929
- Publication place: China

Ni Huanzhi (simplified Chinese: 倪焕之; traditional Chinese: 倪煥之), sometimes translated into English as The Schoolmaster Ni Huanzhi, is a Chinese novel written by Ye Shengtao, published in the late 1920s. The novel was considered by some critics to be a representative portrayal of the May Fourth generation.

The novel depicts the life of an idealistic young intellectual from the periods of the Xinhai Revolution to the Northern Expedition.
