= Zhiyanzhai =

Commentator on "The Dream of the Red Chamber"

Zhiyanzhai (脂硯齋/脂砚斋; pinyin: Zhī Yànzhāi, literally: "Rouge Inkstone Studio", sometimes translated as Red Inkstone or Rouge Inkstone) was the pseudonym of an early and mysterious commentator of the 18th-century Chinese novel Dream of the Red Chamber. This person was a contemporary of the author Cao Xueqin who knew the author intimately enough to be regarded as the chief commentator of his work while it was still unpublished. Most early hand-copied manuscripts of the novel contain red or black-inked commentaries by a few unknown commentators, considered authoritative enough to be transcribed by scribes into subsequent generations of copies. Zhiyanzhai was the most prominent of these commentators. Early copies of Dream were known as 脂硯齋重評石頭記 ("Zhiyanzhai's Re-Annotations to The Story of the Stone"). These versions are known as 脂本, or "Rouge Versions", in Chinese. They are the manuscripts with the highest textual reliability.

Zhiyanzhai had clearly finished reading Cao's completed draft to reveal details which would otherwise be lost to later generations. It was mostly through Zhiyanzhai's comments that scholars learn (even if fragmentarily) about some passages and incidents in the original ending. Zhiyanzhai also conclusively identified the work as Cao Xueqin's. Orthodox Redologists rely extensively on Zhiyanzhai's notes for research and scholarly conjectures, although the identity of Zhiyanzhai remains a mystery.

Redology scholar Zhou Ruchang speculated that Zhiyanzhai was a woman, the second wife and cousin of Cao Xueqin and the person on whom the character Shi Xiangyun was based. This hypothesis has not been universally accepted and Zhiyanzhai's identity continues to be shrouded in mystery. Wu Shichang dismissed Zhou's theory and the possibility of Zhiyanzhai's being a woman based on internal evidence in the commentary and argued that he was a younger brother of Cao's father; British Sinologist David Hawkes speculated Zhiyanzhai was Cao's "kinsman-collaborator". Maram Epstein hypothesizes the name "Zhiyanzhai" may be merely a "compilation of voices".

== Famous comment by Zhiyanzhai ==
- "If Xueqin was merely the work's editor as stated in the novel, who might be the author of this preface thus far? You see how extremely cunning this author could be." (若云雪芹披閱增刪，然則開卷至此這一篇楔子又係誰撰？足見作者之筆狡猾之甚。)
  - The single comment (transcribed in the Jiaxu manuscript) which established Cao Xueqin as the book's author.

== See also ==
- Odd Tablet – another Red Chamber commentator who was related to Cao and Zhiyanzhai.
