= Zhu Ziqing =

Chinese essayist, poet and scholar (1898–1948)

- 朱自清
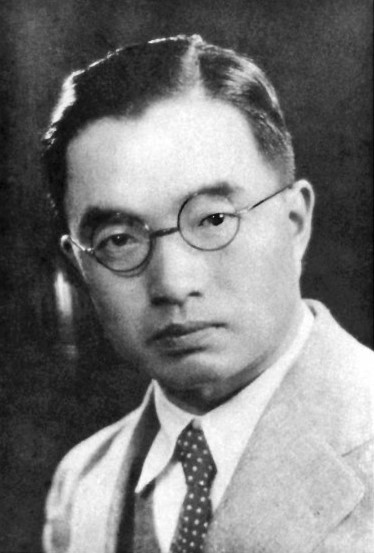
- Born: Zhu Zihua; 22 November 1898; Bushang Village, Pingming, Donghai County, Haizhou Directly Administered Prefecture, Jiangsu, Qing China
- Died: 12 August 1948 (aged 49); Beiping, Republic of China
- Resting place: Wan'an Cemetery
- Education: Peking University
- Occupations: Essayist, poet, scholar, educator
- Spouse(s): Wu Zhongqian (m. 1916; died 1929) Chen Zhuyin (m. 1932–1948)
- Children: 8
- Writing career
- Language: Chinese, English
- Period: 1919–1948
- Genres: Prose, essay, poetry, literary criticism
- Notable works: Retreating Figure; Moonlight over the Lotus Pond; Hurry; Conversations on the Classics

Zhu Ziqing
- Chinese: 朱自清
Transcriptions
Standard Mandarin
- Hanyu Pinyin: Zhū Zìqīng
- Wade–Giles: Chu Tzu-ch'ing

Alternative Chinese name
- Chinese: 朱自華
Transcriptions
Standard Mandarin
- Hanyu Pinyin: Zhū Zìhuá
- Wade–Giles: Chu Tzu-hua

Zhu Ziqing (22 November 1898 – 12 August 1948), born Zhu Zihua, courtesy name Peixian (佩弦) and art name Shiqiu (實秋), was a Chinese essayist, poet, scholar and educator. A native of Shaoxing, Zhejiang, and born in what is now Donghai County, Jiangsu, he is chiefly remembered for his essays in vernacular Chinese and for his early new poetry. He is especially associated with such prose pieces as Retreating Figure and Moonlight over the Lotus Pond. He served as a professor and later head of the Department of Chinese at Tsinghua University and, during the Second Sino-Japanese War, at the National Southwestern Associated University.

Zhu occupies a foundational position in the history of modern Chinese prose. His essays are frequently praised for their structural coherence, emotional restraint, colloquial precision, and capacity to fuse landscape observation with inward feeling. At the same time, his work has attracted scholarly debate, particularly regarding its lyrical ornamentation and rhetorical finish. In modern Chinese literary history, he is generally regarded as one of the canonical prose writers of the Republican period.

== Life and career ==
=== Early life and family background ===
Zhu Ziqing was born on 22 November 1898 in Bushang Village, Pingming, in Donghai County, then part of Haizhou Directly Administered Prefecture in Jiangsu. His ancestral home, however, was Shaoxing, Zhejiang.

His grandfather, Zhu Zeyu, had originally borne the surname Yu and had been adopted into the Zhu family, eventually serving as a county magistrate's clerk in Donghai. In 1901 Zhu's father, Zhu Hongjun, took up official employment in Shaobo, Gaoyou, and the family moved there. Zhu began his education in a traditional private school. In 1903, when he was six, the family settled in Yangzhou, the city with which he would later be most closely associated.

In his autobiographical essay I Am a Yangzhou Man (我是扬州人), Zhu recalled that his family had only come to eastern Jiangsu in his grandfather's generation and that he himself had been born in Haizhou. He also remarked on his affection for the local speech of Haizhou, noting that traces of it survived in his father's Yangzhou accent.

In 1908 he entered Shuangzhongci Primary School, while also studying classical Chinese in evening classes. In 1912, during the political turmoil of the early Republic, the Yangzhou military authorities under Xu Baoshan exacted forced contributions from local households in the name of revolution, and the Zhu family lost much of its property. That same year he transferred to Anhui Lüyang Public School, and later entered Jiangsu Provincial Eighth Middle School in Yangzhou. Zhu's relationship with his father was frequently tense, a dynamic later readers often explore when analysing Retreating Figure.

=== Peking University and the May Fourth period ===
In 1916, Zhu graduated from secondary school and entered the preparatory programme of Peking University. By arrangement of his parents, he married Wu Zhongqian, daughter of the Yangzhou physician Wu Weisan. In 1917, he advanced to the Department of Philosophy. Around this period, in response to financial hardship and out of a wish to preserve moral self-discipline, he changed his given name from Zihua to Ziqing, drawing from the Chu Ci to signify integrity and moral purity. He adopted the courtesy name Peixian, inspired by the Han Feizi passage advising one to wear a taut bowstring to counteract natural sluggishness.

While at Peking University he participated in the Commoners' Education Lecture Group and became acquainted with Deng Zhongxia. During the May Fourth Movement of 1919 he joined demonstrations in Beijing and also took part in student organisational work. It was during this period that he began writing new poetry and entered the orbit of the New Culture literary world.

=== Early teaching posts and literary emergence ===
After graduating from the Department of Philosophy at Peking University in June 1920, Zhu returned south and took up a post at Zhejiang Provincial First Normal School in Hangzhou. In November that year he became one of the early members of the Literary Research Association. On 10 October 1921 the Chenguang Society was established, and both Zhu and Ye Shengtao served as advisers. Later that autumn, Zhu taught Chinese at the China Public School in Wusong.

In early 1922, pressed by economic necessity, he accepted an invitation from Zheng Hechun, principal of Zhejiang Provincial Sixth Normal School, and went to teach in Taizhou. Through the introduction of Wang Jingzhi, he became acquainted with Feng Xuefeng and Pan Mohua. He later helped to found the journal Poetry (詩) with Yu Pingbo, Ye Shengtao and Liu Yanling, one of the earliest journals devoted to new poetry.

=== Wenzhou and Ningbo years ===
In 1923 Zhu increasingly turned to prose. His first major essay, The Qinhuai River in the Sound of Oars and Lamplight (槳聲燈影裡的秦淮河), was warmly received on publication, and Zhou Zuoren reportedly praised it as a model of artistic vernacular prose. In March that year Zhu went to Wenzhou, where he taught at Wenzhou High School. He wrote the school's song, and one of its lines, "to aid the nation and enlighten the people" (英奇匡国，作圣启蒙), later became the institution's motto. During his Wenzhou period he also wrote the four essays later grouped as Traces of Wenzhou (溫州的蹤跡), including the well-known Green (綠), a lyrical description of the Meiyutan waterfall at Xianyan.

In February 1924 Zhu moved to Ningbo to teach at Zhejiang Provincial Fourth Middle School, while also lecturing part-time at Chunhui Middle School. There he came to know Xia Mianzun, Li Shutong and Feng Zikai. In the same year he published Traces, his first collection of poems and essays.

=== Tsinghua years ===
In 1925 Zhu edited Our June (我們的六月). Not long afterwards he joined Tsinghua School, later Tsinghua University, where he devoted more attention to literary research while increasingly concentrating his own creative work on prose.

In 1928 he published his first major essay collection, Retreating Figure. The pieces in the volume, based on close personal observation and direct emotional experience, established the style for which he became famous: plain but elegant diction, controlled feeling, and a capacity to draw lasting emotion from ordinary scenes. The title essay would become one of the best-known prose texts in twentieth-century China.

His first wife, Wu Zhongqian, died of illness in 1929 at the age of 31. Her death was a severe personal blow. In 1930, when Yang Zhensheng became president of National Qingdao University, Zhu served for a time as acting head of its Chinese Department.

=== Britain and return to China ===
On 22 August 1931 Zhu left Beiping overland for Britain, where he studied linguistics and English literature at the University of London. He returned to Shanghai on 31 July 1932 and, in August that year, married Chen Zhuyin. He then resumed teaching at Tsinghua.

In 1934 he was among the editors of the prose magazine Taibai and of Literary Quarterly. In 1935 he edited the poetry volume of the Compendium of New Chinese Literature (中國新文學大系) and wrote its introduction. He also published the essay collection You and Me (Ni wo). The prose of this period is often regarded as somewhat less immediately lyrical than his earlier work, but more mature in structure and more natural in colloquial expression.

=== War years ===
In 1938, during the Second Sino-Japanese War, Zhu went to Kunming, where he became head of the Department of Chinese at the National Southwestern Associated University, the wartime union of Peking University, Tsinghua University and Nankai University. He was also elected a director of the All-China Resistance Association of Writers and Artists.

Despite difficult living conditions, Zhu continued to teach and carry out literary scholarship with great seriousness. During these years he also collaborated with Ye Shengtao on works related to language and education, including Teaching Chinese (國文教學). These wartime years further strengthened his reputation as both writer and teacher.

=== Final years and death ===
After the end of the war, Zhu continued his academic and editorial work. In 1946 he edited the supplement Language and Literature (語言與文學) for the newspaper Xinsheng bao. He also became increasingly sympathetic to student activism and to broader criticisms of the Kuomintang government.

On 18 June 1948 he signed the Declaration Protesting the American Policy of Supporting Japan and Refusing American Relief Flour. He died in Beiping on 12 August 1948 at the age of 49. The immediate cause of death was a severe duodenal ulcer leading to perforation, rather than starvation.

The widespread belief that Zhu starved to death derives largely from a famous passage in Mao Zedong's Farewell, Leighton Stuart, which praised Zhu's moral integrity by stating that he would rather starve than accept American relief grain. Later research and contemporary testimony, however, indicate that this was rhetorical rather than literally accurate. Refusing subsidised American flour undoubtedly worsened the family's financial situation, but surviving diary evidence does not suggest that the household was reduced to starvation. Instead, the records point to persistent digestive illness, restricted eating, and repeated pain associated with his ulcer condition. Contemporary diary entries record statements such as "Drank cow's milk, but it caused severe distress", "Ate too heavily at dinner", and "Despite good appetite, must restrain myself due to illness". On 29 July 1948, merely eleven days after signing the anti-American flour declaration, he wrote in his journal: "Still prone to overindulgence; must be careful!" Medical consensus indicates that his duodenal ulcer, exacerbated by stress and dietary indiscretion, ruptured, leading to fatal peritonitis.

== Writing and reputation ==
Zhu Ziqing is best known as a master of the modern Chinese lyric essay. The essays most frequently singled out for praise include Retreating Figure, Moonlight over the Lotus Pond, and Green. Retreating Figure in particular has become canonical in modern Chinese prose. Through unadorned language and a tightly focused scene, it conveys paternal affection, filial remorse and retrospective tenderness with unusual force.

His descriptive prose also occupies an important place in the development of modern Chinese nature writing. In essays such as Green and Moonlight over the Lotus Pond, he used vernacular diction to produce prose that was lucid, musical and delicately textured. His descriptive passages often rely on simile, contrast and rhythmic balance, yet they rarely lose contact with concrete sensory experience.

Critics have often summarised Zhu's prose as structurally tight, plain in surface diction, clear in movement, restrained yet evocative, and highly attentive to emotional nuance. He excelled at expressing feeling through scene, so that landscape and inward mood become closely intertwined. Zhu himself once remarked that his deepest interest lay in poetry—especially Song poetry—and that, as a prose writer, he especially loved poetry that moved in the direction of prose.

His work has also attracted criticism. Ye Shengtao thought that pieces such as Moonlight over the Lotus Pond, The Qinhuai River in the Sound of Oars and Lamplight, and Hurry were somewhat mannered and overly attentive to rhetoric, at the expense of naturalness. Tang Tao similarly argued that, although the language was smooth and faultless, some of these essays lacked the living energy of speech itself. Han Han later questioned why textbook compilers preferred Moonlight over the Lotus Pond, which he regarded as ornate and hollow. Xia Zhiqing offered further reservations about certain aspects of Zhu's lyricism, imagery and syntax.

Even so, Zhu's place in literary history remains secure. His essays have long been staples of Chinese-language education in both mainland China and Taiwan, and his best-known works continue to shape the general understanding of what modern Chinese prose can be.

== Works ==
=== Poetry and poetry collections ===
- Xuechao (1922), an anthology by members of the Literary Research Association
- Huimie (Destruction, 1923), a long poem

=== Short fiction ===
- Bie (别, 1921)
- The History of Laughter (笑的歷史, 1923)

=== Essay collections ===
- Traces (1924)
- Retreating Figure (1928)
- Miscellanies of European Travel (1934)
- You and Me (1936)
- London Miscellanies (1943)

=== Individual essays ===
- Hurry (1922)
- The Qinhuai River in the Sound of Oars and Lamplight
- Green
- Moonlight over the Lotus Pond
- Spring

=== Scholarship, criticism and language studies ===
- Conversations on the Classics (1946)
- Miscellaneous Talks on New Poetry (1947)
- On the Tradition that Poetry Expresses Intent (1947)
- Standards and Measures (1948)
- Fragments on Language and Literature (1948)
- On Appreciation by Both the Refined and the Popular (1948)
- Book Reviews and Critical Essays

== Family ==
Zhu's younger brother Zhu Wuhua was a distinguished radio engineer. His eldest son, Zhu Maixian, later joined the Chinese Communist Party and was executed in 1951 during the Campaign to Suppress Counterrevolutionaries. His other children included Zhu Runsheng, Zhu Qiaosen, Zhu Siyu, Zhu Caizhi, Zhu Tixian, Zhu Xiaowu and Zhu Rongjun.
