= Wu Zuxiang =

Chinese writer and educator

Wu Zuxiang (simplified Chinese: 吴组缃; traditional Chinese: 吳組緗; pinyin: Wú Zǔxiāng; Wade–Giles: Wu Tsu-hsiang; 5 April 1908 – 11 January 1994) was a Chinese writer and educator who began his literary career during the May Fourth Movement. For most of his life, he taught Chinese literature at Tsinghua and Peking Universities. Despite writing only two small volumes of short stories and one novel, Wu Zuxiang is considered one of the best writers of his generation.

== Biography ==
Wu Zuxiang was born in the village of Maolin (茂林), Jing County, Anhui Province in 1908 to a well-off family. Beginning in 1918, he received a traditional education in a small private school in Maolin began by his father, Wu Qingyu. By 1921, he surpassed the other children and left his native village to study, in turn, at middle schools in Xuancheng, Wuhu, and Shanghai.

In autumn of 1929, Zuxiang enrolled in Qinghua University in Beijing as an economics major, yet within a year changed to Chinese language. By this time, he was already married and had three children of his own. In 1933 he graduated, yet stayed at the university to pursue postgraduate studies. In 1935, however, Zuxiang suspended his studies in order to work as a private tutor and secretary for Feng Yuxiang.

In spring of 1938, Wu Zuxiang was one of the originators—along with Guo Moruo, Mao Dun, Ding Ling, Lao She, Zhu Ziqing, Yu Dafu, and over 90 other people—of "National Chinese Literature and Art Society of Enemy Resistance." During the Second Sino-Japanese War, he wrote his first novel, Mountain Torrent 山洪.

After the war, when Feng Yuxiang left for the United States, Wu Zuxiang accepted a position as a professor at Jinling Women's School of Arts and Sciences, and then professor and head of Chinese language department at Qinghua University. In 1952, he became a professor at Beijing University, concentrating on classical Chinese literature and the study of Ming and Qing dynasty novels, eventually presiding over Hongloumeng Research Society.

== Works ==
=== Stories ===
- 管管的补品 "Young Master's Tonic" (1932)
- 一千八百担 "Eighteen Hundred Piculs" (1934)

=== Collections ===
- 西柳集 (1934)
- 饭余集 (1935)

=== Novels ===
- 山洪 Mountain Torrent (1943)

=== Books ===
- 聊斋志异欣赏. Beijing, China: Peking University Press. 1989. (Appreciation of "Strange Stories from a Chinese Studio")

=== Translations ===
==== English ====
- Ling Hsu, Vivian (1981). Born of the same roots : stories of modern Chinese women. Bloomington: Indiana University Press. ISBN 0253195268. (contains "Two Women")
- Siu, Helen F. (1990). Furrows, peasants, intellectuals, and the state: stories and histories from modern China. Stanford, Cali.: Stanford University Press. ISBN 0804718059. (contains "A Certain Day")
- Lau, Joseph S. M.; Goldblatt, Howard (2007). The Columbia Anthology of Modern Chinese Literature (3 ed.). New York: Columbia University Press. ISBN 0231138415. (contains "Young Master Gets His Tonic")
- Wu, Zuxiang (1989). Green bamboo hermitage. Beijing, China: Chinese Literature Press. ISBN 0835120686.
