= Wang Shoupeng =

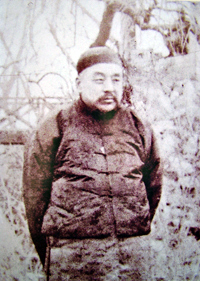

Wang Shoupeng (Chinese: 王寿彭; pinyin: Wáng Shòupéng; 1875–1929) was a scholar, educator, and calligrapher in the late Qing and early Republican-era China. In 1903, he ranked as the top scholar in Shandong in the imperial examinations. In 1905, he traveled to Japan on an investigative tour with five ministers including Zaize and Duanfang. He was the author of the influential book Records of Investigation (考察录) advocating educational reforms and establishment of industry. In 1910, he moved to Wuchang, Wuhan, where he became the education commissioner for Hubei province. In Hubei, he founded the Lianghu General Normal School (两湖优级师范学堂) and introduced a new budget system for school funding. Following the 1911 Revolution, Wang served in various government positions, including secretary of the Shandong Province Governor's Office and secretary-general of the Presidential Palace in Beijing. In 1925, he was director of the education department for Shandong Province. In 1926, Wang founded the provincial Shandong University in Jinan and served as its president. As president, he advocated respect for Confucius, pushing for the renovation of Temple of Confucius, Qufu, as well as the reading of classics. Facing criticism for his "outdated" views, he resigned from the post in 1927. After the Northern Expeditionary Army entered Jinan in 1928, he followed General Zhang Zongchang to Tianjin, where he died of illness the following year.

Academic offices
| Preceded by Zhou Xuexi | President of Shandong University; 1926–1927 | Succeeded by Yang Zhensheng |
