= East Yi West Xia =

East Yi West Xia (Chinese: 夷夏東西說; pinyin: Yí Xìa Dōngxī Shuō) is an obsolete theory which proposes that the culture of the Chinese Shang dynasty was established by two ethnic groups; namely, that the Western part of the Shang dynasty was developed by the Xia ethnic group, and the eastern part of Shang dynasty was developed by the Yi ethnic group.

== History of the theory ==
This theory was suggested by future linguist Fu Sinian in his thesis 1933. It was further expanded by Liang Siyong who suggested that the newly discovered Yangshao culture was established by the Xia in the west and the Longshan culture by the Yi peoples of the east. For Chinese and Western historians this hypothesis became the prevailing theory to interpret Chinese prehistory and remained so until about 1960.

Further archaeological discoveries made the theory obsolete. In 1950s it became clear that the Yinxu culture was preceded by the Erligang culture in Zhongyuan. In addition, the gap between the Erligang culture and the Longshan culture was joined by the Erlitou culture, which was named after the Erlitou site discovered in 1959. Chinese scholars identify the Erligang and Erlitou cultures as the sites of the Shang and Xia Dynasties respectively although the archaeological boundary between the two dynasties was still debatable. In 1983, the ruin of Yanshi Shang City was discovered and identified as the Erligang culture. The ruin very close to the Erlitou site suggests that the Erlitou and Erligang cultures were dominated by people with different cultural background.

In Shandong, the Shandong Longshan culture was replaced by the Yueshi culture around 2000 B.C. The sites of the Yueshi culture show complementary distribution with those of the Erligang culture which expanded eastward from Zhongyuan. It proved that the Shang people did not originated in the east.

== Implications ==
Though largely replaced and modified by later further research, Fu Sinian's theory entered the history as a landmark in Chinese historiography. It essentially questioned ethnic homogeneity sometimes postulated as the route of Chinese civilization. This contributed to the concept of the dialogical development of cultures.
