= Chinese Literary Association =

Chinese literary society (1920–1925)

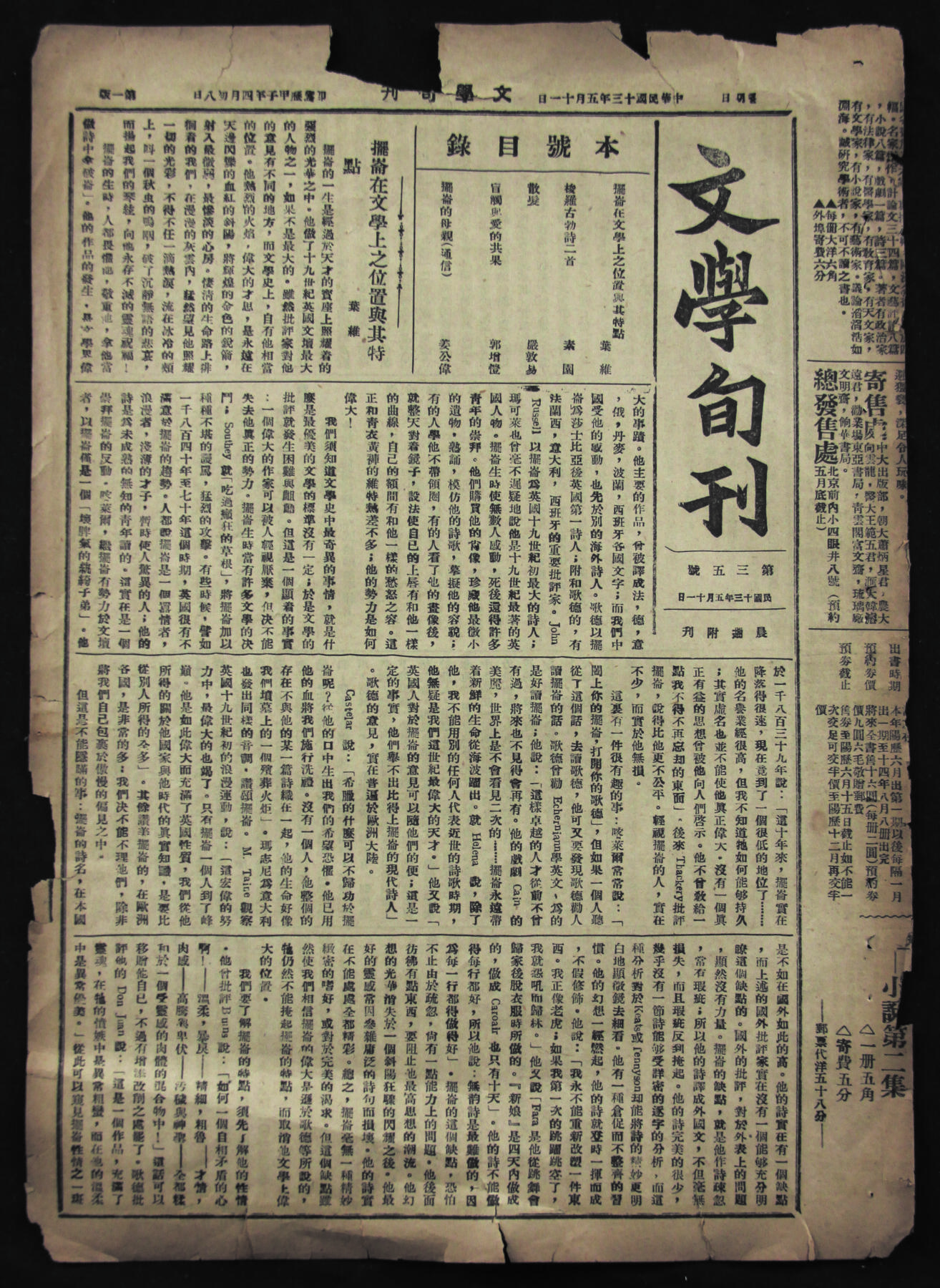
A 1924 issue of the Literature Trimonthly, one of the association's literary magazines

The Chinese Literary Association (Chinese: 文学研究会; pinyin: Wénxué yánjiū huì; lit. 'Literary Research Association') was the largest literary society active in China during the 1920s. Founded in Beijing by a group of twelve writers (including Shen Yanbing, Ye Shengtao, Zheng Zhenduo, and Zhou Zuoren) in late 1920, the association abandoned its initial plans to begin a literary journal after Shen was appointed the editor-in-chief of the Commercial Press literary magazine Fiction Monthly. Association members contributed to the Fiction Monthly and the Literature Trimonthly, established as a supplement to the Shanghai China Times. Branches of the association were established in Shanghai, Beijing, and Guangzhou, each producing their own version of the Literature Trimonthly. The association managed the production of literary book series for the Commercial Press throughout the 1920s and 1930s. However, the society largely ceased independent activities after 1925. The Literature Trimonthly (renamed the Literature Weekly after 1925) ceased publication in 1929.

== Founding ==
On 4 December 1920, a group of twelve writers—including Shen Yanbing (also known as Mao Dun), Ye Shengtao, Zheng Zhenduo, and Zhou Zuoren—met to establish a literary association in Beijing, dubbed the Literary Research Association (文学研究会; Wénxué yánjiū huì, translated by the society as the Chinese Literary Association). According to Ye, the association was organized after discussions among their friend group that November about starting a literary magazine to "promote common sense about literature" and publish their personal works.

The association attempted to find a publisher for their prospective journal in Shanghai. At the house of scholar and military leader Jiang Baili, they made a deal with representatives of the Commercial Press, then the largest publishing firm in China. Shen Yanbing was appointed the editor-in-chief of the press's literary magazine Fiction Monthly, which then began to feature writings from association members. With creative freedom over the magazine, the writers abandoned plans to start an independent literary magazine, but continued to organize their association, seeking to create a large independent organization. They published a manifesto in several newspapers in mid-December, which appeared alongside their bylaws in New Youth and the January 1921 edition of Fiction Monthly. This manifesto declared that the association sought to create a "writer's union" and advance the understanding of literature.

Many of the founding members of the society had previously been associated with New Culture journals such as New Youth and New Tide. They may have been inspired by groups such as the Young China Association (then likely the largest student's organization in China), as testified by similarities within the groups' bylaws, as well as by previous literary organizations such as the Southern Society. The following month, on 4 January 1921, 21 attendees held the society's formal inauguration at Central Park (now Zhongshan Park). Zheng was elected the society's General Secretary, while Geng Jizhi was elected treasurer.

== History ==
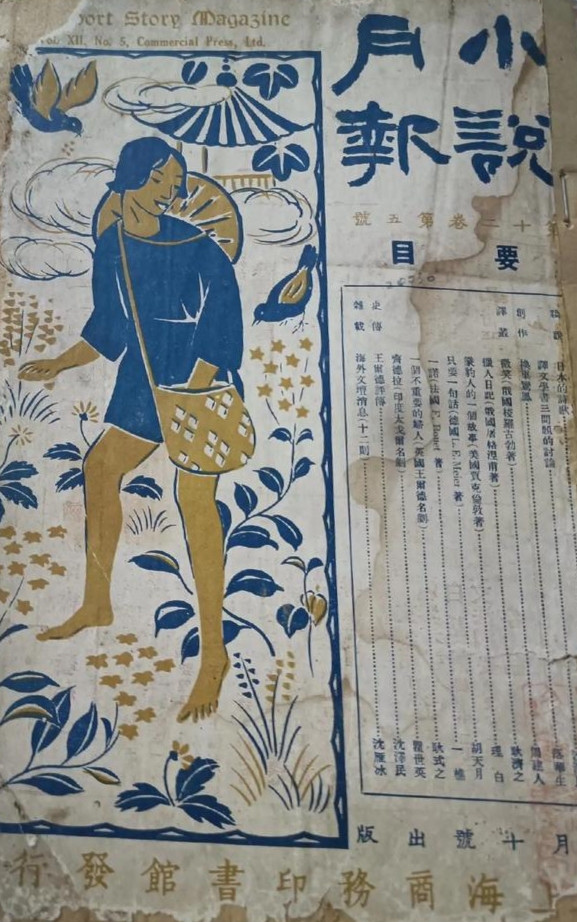
Cover of Vol. 12, No. 5 of the Fiction Monthly, 1923

Soon after its establishment, the association organized the collection of regular dues, seeking to lay the groundwork for future independence from the Commercial Press. The Literary Association became the largest of the many literary societies active in China during the 1920s, with around 170 members spread between Beijing, Shanghai, Guangzhou, and Ningbo.

Proponents of the New Literature movement, they sought to create a new Chinese vernacular literature along the lines of Western "high literature", distinguishing it from both older classical writing and mass-market popular fiction. They were initially hesitant to associate themselves too closely with the Fiction Monthly, as it had been previously a popular fiction magazine associated with the 'Mandarin Duck and Butterfly' school of Chinese genre fiction. In August 1921, Shen complained to Zhou that the Fiction Monthly was seen as a 'laughing stock' by other Shanghai newspapers, and that it was difficult to organize activities for the society in Shanghai with most of its members in Beijing.

In March 1921, Zheng resigned as General Secretary upon moving to Shanghai to pursue training as a railroad official. He was replaced by Qu Shiying. Soon after his move, Zheng left his position at the railway and began work full-time for the Commercial Press. In May 1921, he began a newspaper supplement for The China Times which he titled the Literature Trimonthly (文學旬刊; Wénxué xúnkān), with content mainly produced by Literary Association members. A year later, in May 1922, Zheng announced in the supplement that it had become an official organ of the association, and would be made available free of charge to all association members.

By the end of 1921, members had largely moved away from Beijing, and difficulties emerged in organizing activities between them. Relatively inactive, the association was revived after the Literature Trimonthly became an official organ. In 1922, members in Shanghai organized a local branch (headed by Shen Yanbing) and a physical headquarters. Poetry Monthly, a short-lived poetry magazine established earlier in the year by association members, was also converted into an organ for the society. Two other society periodicals, both named Literature Trimonthly, were established as supplements to the Beijing Morning Post and the Guangzhou Yuehua Post (越華報; Yuèhuá bào) in 1923. The latter of these was staffed by a group of students and faculty at Lingnan University who had established a local branch of the association.

From 1923 to 1925, the association sold postcards of famous foreign writers. When Bengali poet and polymath Rabindranath Tagore visited Shanghai in 1924, the association arranged for two members to serve as his interpreters, and took a series of photos to commemorate his arrival.

== Publications ==
In partnership with the Commercial Press, the association produced several series of books beginning in 1921, including a general Literary Association Series (1921–1939), a creative writing series (1936–1947), a world literature series (1930–1939), and a popular theater series (1924–1928). Additionally, they produced one volume of a "Literary Association Humor Series" in 1942.

A series of research papers written for the society by Zheng Zhenduo examined traditional Chinese literature. These included a classification guide for Chinese literary genres, examinations of the Romance of the Three Kingdoms and Water Margin, and a monograph entitled "A History of Chinese Literature". In 1926, he edited a "Chinese Literature Research" supplement to Fiction Monthly, featuring 69 research papers on classical Chinese literature by association members.

Novels produced for the association by members often focused on the lives of intellectuals or laborers. The former often explored the search for meaning in life and their political radicalization in the face of contemporary Chinese society, while the latter criticized the hardships faced by the working class.

=== Translations ===
The Literary Association translated a large body of foreign literary works, including novels, short stories, plays, poems, and essays. Over the available portions of its publication, Fiction Monthly featured over eight hundred translated works originating from at least 38 different countries. The association's Literature Trimonthly, Poetry Monthly, and book series also featured many translated works.

In addition to works from Europe, the United States, and Japan, the society emphasized translating works from the "oppressed nations" and the Soviet Union. A September 1921 special issue of Fiction Monthly featured translations of works from Czechoslovakia, Finland, Poland, Serbia, and Ukraine. Around 150 Russian and Soviet works were translated by the association; among the most prolific translators of these was Geng Jizhi, who translated 19 works by Russian authors (especially Leo Tolstoy) for the society.

== Disbandment and legacy ==
The association ceased to exist as a coherent body after around 1925, with its activities limited to managing the finances and royalties of their literature series. Members continued to publish their works under the inactive association's name up through the 1940s. The society was one of a group of academic societies who signed on to a "Manifesto of United Shanghai Academic Organizations" during the anti-imperialist May Thirtieth Movement in 1925.

Although new members continued to join the society until 1928, no records exist of continued group activities. The Shanghai Literature Trimonthly became an independent periodical published by the Beixin Press in 1925, and was renamed Literature Weekly (文學週報; Wénxué zhōubào). The publication of the journal ceased at some point in 1929.

Historian Michel Hockx described the Literary Association as likely the first Chinese literary organization to combine "the traditional habit of working in societies with the efficiency of the modem printing industry". Many of the association's members were students who went on to work as teachers, publishers, and academics. Some were later involved in politics, equally split between Communist and anti-Communist factions. A majority of the association's known members lived into their old age; Gu Yuxiu (also known as Gu Yiqiao) was the last surviving member, dying in 2002.
