= Ukiyoburo =

Novel by Shikitei Sanba

Ukiyoburo (浮世風呂; Japanese pronunciation: [ɯ.kʲi.joꜜ.bɯ.ɾo, ɯ.kʲi.jo.bɯ.ɾo]) is a Japanese novel written by Shikitei Sanba between 1809 and 1813. It belongs to the kokkeibon genre, of which it is one of the masterpieces.

== Contents ==
Ukiyoburo (Ukiyo Bath) depicts the humor of daily life and culture through the conversations of customers at the public bath. It contains illustrations from Utagawa Kuninao and Kitao Shigemasa (credited as Kitagawa Yoshimaru).

Shikitei notes that his inspiration to base the story at a public bath was due to Santō Kyōden's Kengu Irigomi Sentō Shinwa (賢愚湊銭湯新話) (1802) and a rakugo performance by Sanshōtei Karaku.

The text is composed of four parts contained within nine volumes:

- Part 1: "Men's Bath", published in 1809
- Part 2: "Women's Bath", published in 1810
- Part 3: "Omissions from the Women's Bath", published in 1812
- Part 4: "Men's Bath Continued", published in 1813

There were advertisements for parts 5, 6, and 7, but they were never written.

== Linguistics ==
Shikitei was particularly careful in noting a number of linguistic characteristics.

In part two, a woman speaking the Kansai dialect and a woman speaking the Tokyo dialect talk. The Kansai woman notes that Tōkyō speakers de-labialize [kwa] to [ka]. In addition, Tōkyō speakers have a tendency to confuse [ç] and [ɕ].

In addition, Shikitei creates an orthography which he calls "white voicing" to distinguish medial [ɡ] from [ŋ]. He also uses the Handakuten mark with the s-character to express [tsa, tse, tso].
