= Shikitei Sanba =

Japanese comic writer

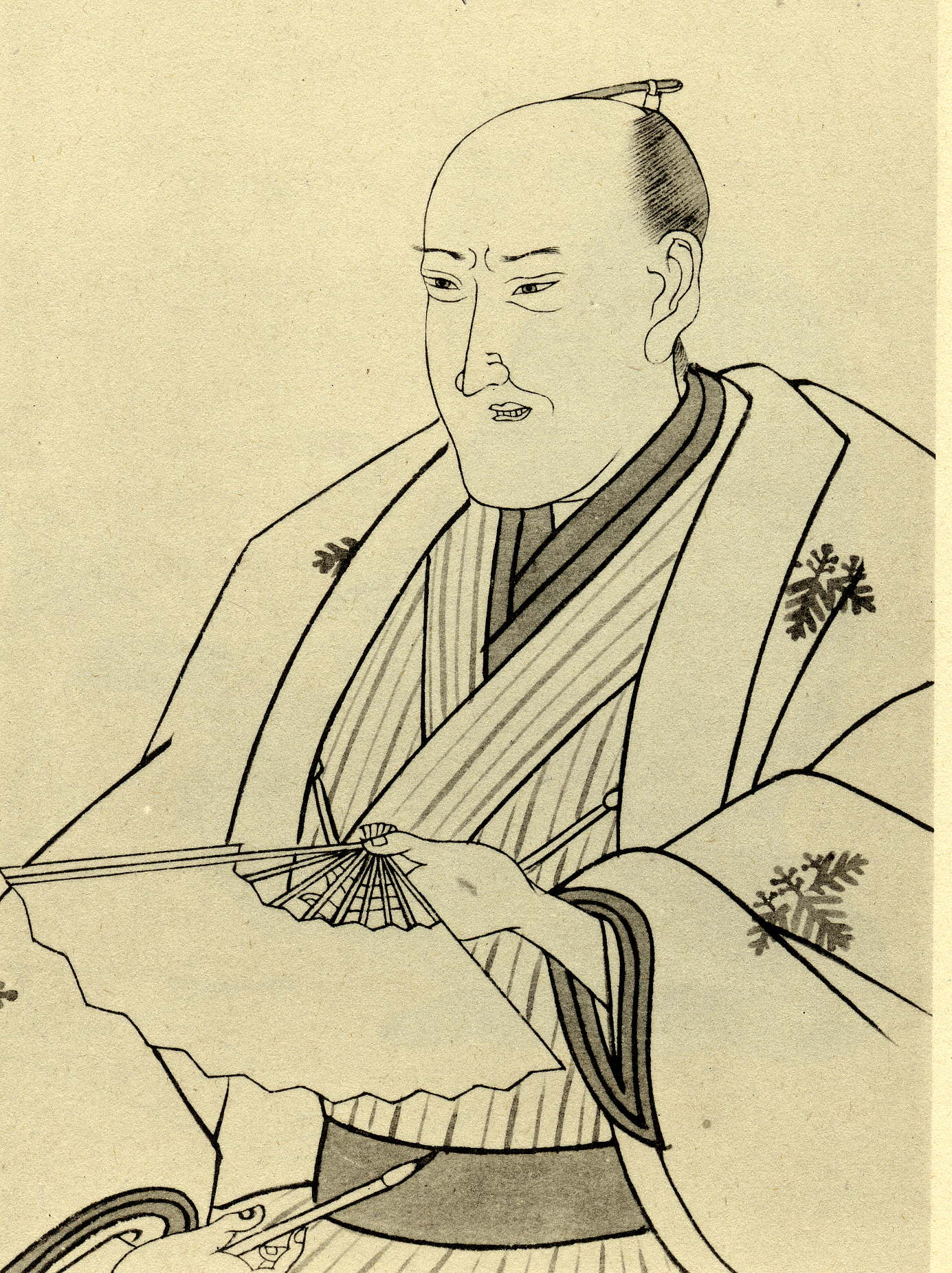
Shikitei Sanba

Kikuchi Hisanori (菊池 久徳; 1776 – February 27, 1822), better known by his pen name Shikitei Sanba (式亭 三馬; Japanese pronunciation: [ɕi̥.k̟ʲí.té̞í (|) sä́m̀.bä̀, -té̞í | sä̀ḿ.bä́, -té̞í (|) sä́ḿ.bä́, -té̞é̞-]), was a Japanese comic writer of the Edo period.

== Major works ==
- Ukiyoburo
- Ukiyodoko
