= Ou Xifan =

Ou Xifan (Chinese: 歐希範) was a robber from the Northern Song dynasty (CE X-XII c.) who was killed and dissected, along with 56 of his followers

For a culture where the dissection of human bodies was seen as unethical, as described by confucian filial piety, the bodies of rebels and criminals provided the Chinese dynasties rare opportunities for learning about their bodies.

== See also ==
- History of anatomy
- Chinese medicine
- Filial piety
- Medicine in China
- History of science and technology in China
