= Odd Tablet =

Odd Tablet (as David Hawkes translates his pen name), or more literally, Elderly Maimed Tablet (畸笏叟), was a mysterious commentator of the 18th-century Chinese novel Dream of the Red Chamber. He sometimes signed himself as merely 畸笏 ("Maimed Tablet"). Together with Zhiyanzhai, they were regarded as the two most significant commentators of the Rouge manuscripts. Apparently quite old and an elder (叟 means "Elderly Man"), his comments, like Zhiyanzhai's, were often also in red ink in some Rouge manuscripts.

畸 can mean "maimed", "unevenly shaped", "abnormal" or "leftover". 笏 was a long, rectangular tablet that court officials used to record matters when reporting their duties to the Chinese Emperor. These emblematic tablets were made of jade, ivory, wood or bamboo.

As with Zhiyanzhai, the identity of Odd Tablet has eluded modern Redologists, with some experts believing that they could be the same person. But noted Redologist Cai Yijiang (蔡義江) wrote an essay speculating that Odd Tablet should be author Cao Xueqin's father. What is known for certain now is that Odd Tablet was a person of some authority over Cao Xueqin. He ordered Cao Xueqin to remove a passage detailing the incestuous adultery between Qin Keqing and her father-in-law from Xueqin's original text, leading to Cao Xueqin resorting to very oblique references when writing the sensitive passage. The incident appeared to be based on a household scandal during Cao Xueqin's grandfather, Cao Yin's (曹寅) lifetime.

Odd Tablet outlived Cao Xueqin, becoming the guardian of Cao's working papers. Odd Tablet complained that some pages of the original manuscript were lost because someone had borrowed and then mislaid them. Cao Xueqin died without putting together a cohesive final version of his novel for publication. What we do have is Cao Xueqin's extant first eighty chapters.

Odd Tablet appeared to be some melancholic elder who had gone through the catastrophe of the Cao family's downfall decades ago. He used frequent phrases like 嘆嘆! ("Alas!"), 哭 ("weep"), 傷哉！(an expression of deep grief) in Classical Chinese, and seemed especially troubled by references to the Cao family's sacking. Cai concluded that Odd Tablet should be Cao Fu (曹頫), adopted son and paternal nephew of Cao Yin (曹寅). Cai supports the idea that Cao Yin was Cao Xueqin's paternal grandfather (or, in terms of blood relations, paternal granduncle). In the essay, Cai proposes that Cao Fu ought to be Cao Xueqin's real father. As the head of the household Cao Fu was imprisoned for years by the Yongzheng Emperor. Cai speculates that Fu was maimed during this imprisonment, hence Odd Tablet's frequent repetitions of the phrase 癈人 ("useless/maimed person") and 畸 ("abnormal" or "maimed").
