= Li Xifan =

Chinese literary critic (1927–2018)

- 李希凡
- Born: December 11, 1927; Tongzhou, Beijing, China
- Died: October 29, 2018 (aged 90); Beijing, China
- Education: Shandong University
- Occupations: Marxist literary scholar, redologist
- Spouse: Xu Chao
- Children: 2
- Writing career
- Language: Chinese
- Period: 1954-2018
- Genre: Comment
- Notable work: Comments on Dream of Red Mansions

Chinese name
- Chinese: 李希凡
Transcriptions
Standard Mandarin
- Hanyu Pinyin: Lǐ Xīfán
- Wade–Giles: Li Hsi-fan

Li Xifan (Chinese: 李希凡; Wade–Giles: Li Hsi-fan; 11 December 1927 – 29 October 2018) was a Chinese Marxist literary scholar and redologist. He became nationally famous in 1954, when his critique of the revered redologist Yu Pingbo was praised by Mao Zedong, who seized the opportunity to launch a nationwide campaign to criticize the idealism of Yu Pingbo and Hu Shih. Li later served as a long-time editor of the People's Daily and Vice President of the Chinese National Academy of Arts.

== Early life and education ==
Li was born on 11 December 1927 in Tongzhou District, Beijing, with his ancestral home in Shaoxing, Zhejiang. His name was originally written as Li Xifan (李锡范), and his courtesy name was Choujiu (畴九).

When he was twenty, Li moved to Qingdao, Shandong Province, where he worked as an assistant to his brother-in-law Zhao Jibin (赵纪彬), a professor at Shandong University. Li was later admitted to the university and graduated from its Chinese Department in 1953.

== Criticism of Yu Pingbo ==
Li continued his studies at the graduate school of Renmin University of China, and while a student there, in September 1954 Li and his friend Lan Ling (蓝翎) published a critique of an article about Dream of the Red Chamber written by the revered redologist Yu Pingbo. On October 10, their critique of Yu's book Study of the Dream of the Red Chamber was published in the major national newspaper Guangming Daily, which criticizes the book for lacking "scientific analysis" and for failing to notice the "great anti-feudal trend" represented in the classical novel.

Li and Lan's critiques caught the attention of Mao Zedong, who seized the opportunity to launch an attack against Yu, and ultimately, the idealism espoused by the liberal scholar Hu Shih. Mao wrote a letter on 16 October 1954 praising the courage of Li and Lan, two "nobodies", for attacking an established authority. The letter was circulated within China's top leadership, and Chinese media began a national campaign praising "nobodies" such as Li and Lan while criticizing bourgeois "big wigs" such as Yu.

Mao's praise elevated Li and Lan to national fame, and soon they were transferred to work at the People's Daily, the mouthpiece of the Chinese Communist Party. However, when Li criticized young author Wang Meng's novel A New Arrival at the Organization Department in 1956, he was himself criticized by Mao and had to issue a self-criticism.

== Later career ==
In 1965, Mao's wife Jiang Qing asked Li to write a political criticism of Wu Han's play Hai Rui Dismissed from Office, and Li declined. The piece was ultimately written by Yao Wenyuan (later one of the "Gang of Four"), which became an opening shot of the Cultural Revolution. For his non-cooperation, Li was later persecuted and sent to undergo "reform through labor". While working at the labor camp, he spent his nights writing two books analyzing Lu Xun's works. However, when Jiang Qing was arrested after the end of the Cultural Revolution, Li was sent to labour camp again for his correspondences with her.

Li later returned to work at the People's Daily. In 1986, he was invited by Wang Meng, the author he had criticized 30 years earlier who was now China's Minister of Culture, to serve as executive vice president of the Chinese National Academy of Arts. Li expressed gratitude for Wang's magnanimity and served in the position for the next ten years. He also served as the chief editor of two major works, The Great Dictionary of Dream of the Red Chamber (红楼梦大辞典) and the monumental 14-volume General History of Chinese Art (中华艺术通史).

== Personal life ==
Li was married to Xu Chao (徐潮). They had two daughters, Li Meng (李萌) and Li Lan (李蓝). Li Meng was also a redologist, who was the co-author of Li Xifan's book Commentary on Characters of Dream of the Red Chamber (红楼梦人物论). Li Xifan's wife died in 2012, and when Li Meng also died three months later, his family hid the news from him for more than three years.

Li died at his Beijing home on 29 October 2018, at the age of 90.
