= Zhou Ruchang =

Chinese writer

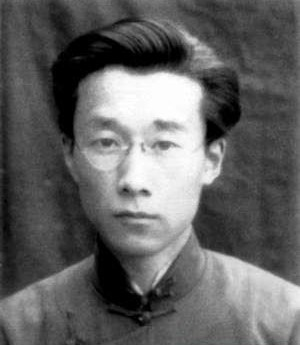
- Born: April 14, 1918; Tianjin
- Died: May 31, 2012 (aged 94); Beijing, China
- Occupations: Writer, noted redologist
- Known for: Translation of English poetry into Chinese; Scholar of Chinese classical literature, especially Dream of the Red Chamber
- Children: 3

Zhou Ruchang (Chinese: 周汝昌; Wade–Giles: Chou Ju-ch'ang; April 14, 1918 – May 31, 2012) was a Chinese writer noted for his study of the novel Dream of the Red Chamber by Cao Xueqin. He is regarded as among the most renowned and influential redologists of the 20th century. In addition, Zhou was also an accomplished calligrapher and expert on traditional Chinese poetry and fiction.

== Early life ==
He was born in Tianjin, China on April 14, 1918, the youngest of five brothers. His father was a scholar and a government official. His first exposure to the novel Honglou meng (a.k.a. Dream of the Red Chamber ) was through his mother, who he said read it to him when he was a child. Later an uncle gave him a copy of the novel. He received an excellent early education in the Chinese classics, and then studied English in the Department of Western Languages and Literature at Yenching University in Beijing. There he impressed his foreign teachers with his impressive English ability, wrote poetry, and translated British poetry into Chinese. His translations of the Romantic age poet Percy Bysshe Shelley greatly impressed the noted scholar and novelist Qian Zhongshu. The renowned scholar, philosopher, and redologist Hu Shih, who called Zhou his best student, was so taken by Zhou's ability that he loaned him his prized 1754 manuscript copy (the Jiaxu manuscript) of Honglou Meng for study. After graduation, Zhou taught English at Sichuan University for a short time before returning to Beijing where he worked at the People's Publishing House researching classical Chinese literature.

== Career ==
In 1953, Zhou published his first and most famous work Honglou Meng Xinzheng 红楼梦新证 (New Evidence on Dream of the Red Chamber), a comprehensive 400,000 word study of the life of Cao Xueqin and his unique family. Zhou later stated that he read 1,000 books for this study and conducted research in government archives and the Forbidden City. This book had a major influence upon the study of Honglou Meng (Redology) and established Zhou's reputation as one of its foremost scholars. The famous Yale University sinologist Jonathan Spence has called this book "a work of such subtlety and meticulous scholarship that it is hard to fault… His book is a brilliant work of research on the Ts'ao [Cao] family background, as well as being a mine of information." Wu Shih Ch'ang, the author of On the Red Dream: A Critical Study of Two Annotated Manuscripts of the 18th Century, the first book to appear on Honglou Meng in English, wrote that Zhou's study "dwarfed all the previous works on this subject. That a bulky academic work of such serious nature should have sold three impressions amounting to 17,000 copies within four months (September - December 1953) is itself a fair comment on the merit of Zhou's book. The present author is indebted to Mr. Chou for his painstaking collection of invaluable materials from sources normally inaccessible to the public." In the book, Zhou advanced the thesis that Honglou Meng was largely autobiographical and reflected Cao Xueqin's own tragic family history as Han bondservants who were attached to a Manchu Banner group.

In 1968 during the height of the Cultural Revolution, Zhou's research papers were confiscated and he was sent to the countryside in Hubei province to tend a vegetable plot for "reeducation." In 1970, he was rehabilitated and transferred back to Beijing. Although his eyesight and hearing were failing, Zhou spent the remainder of his life prolifically writing and giving lectures on Honglou Meng. He was also associated with the Chinese Ministry of Culture, and a Tenured Researcher in the Art Research Institute of China.

Zhou also had a major interest in Western perceptions of Honglou Meng and in the English translation history of the novel. He strongly believed that it was very important that Westerners be acquainted with this novel because he thought that reading it was the best and easiest way for them to learn about Chinese culture. At one stage in his life, he seriously considered translating Dream of the Red Chamber into English. In the 1980s, he was a visiting scholar at the University of Wisconsin, a Luce Scholar, and lectured at several American universities, including Princeton and Columbia. Zhou also gave several well-received lectures on Honglou Meng to foreigners in Beijing in 2002. In 2005, he wrote an article for a special issue of the international comparative literature journal, the Tamkang Review, which was devoted exclusively to the novel. In 2009, he penned a special introduction to the English translation of his 1992 book Cao Xueqin Xin Zhuan 曹雪芹新传 (A New Biography of Cao Xueqin).

Zhou Ruchang remained passionate about Honglou Meng and to the end of his life closely kept up with the research being done on it. His highly informative and captivating lectures, which were delivered without notes on China Central Television's Lecture Room program, made him well known throughout China. These lectures are available (in Chinese) on youtube. He published more than 60 books, including a massive 10 volume study of the different manuscript versions of the novel, an expanded two volume second edition of his first book Honglou Meng Xinzheng, a Dream of the Red Chamber dictionary, several biographies of Cao Xueqin (including a children's book), collections of essays on the novel, and his own reconstruction of the story's original first 80 chapters. In his 2005 work He Jia Bao-yu Duihua 和贾宝玉对话 (A Dialogue with Jia Bao-yu), Zhou has an imaginary extended discussion with the novel's protagonist Jia Bao-yu about Honglou Meng. While not all of his views about the novel were widely accepted, his research about Cao Xueqin and his family was universally recognized as being groundbreaking. Although Zhou formally belonged to the investigative studies school of redology, he disagreed with the drawing of clear boundaries between different scholarly approaches to Honglou Meng. He held that different camps should ultimately complement and not oppose each other.

Zhou also published works on calligraphy, several autobiographies, a widely used dictionary to help high school students understand Tang and Song dynasty poetry, a history of Beijing, and special editions of the poems of the Song dynasty poets Fan Chengda and Yang Wanli. He continued to work right up to the end of his long life. One week before his death, he was dictating to his daughter the outline of his next book.

== Personal life ==
Zhou's wife was Mao Shuren. Zhou has three daughters. Zhou died in his modest, book-cluttered apartment in east Beijing in the early morning of May 31, 2012, at the age of 94.
