= Zhou Zuoren =

Chinese writer

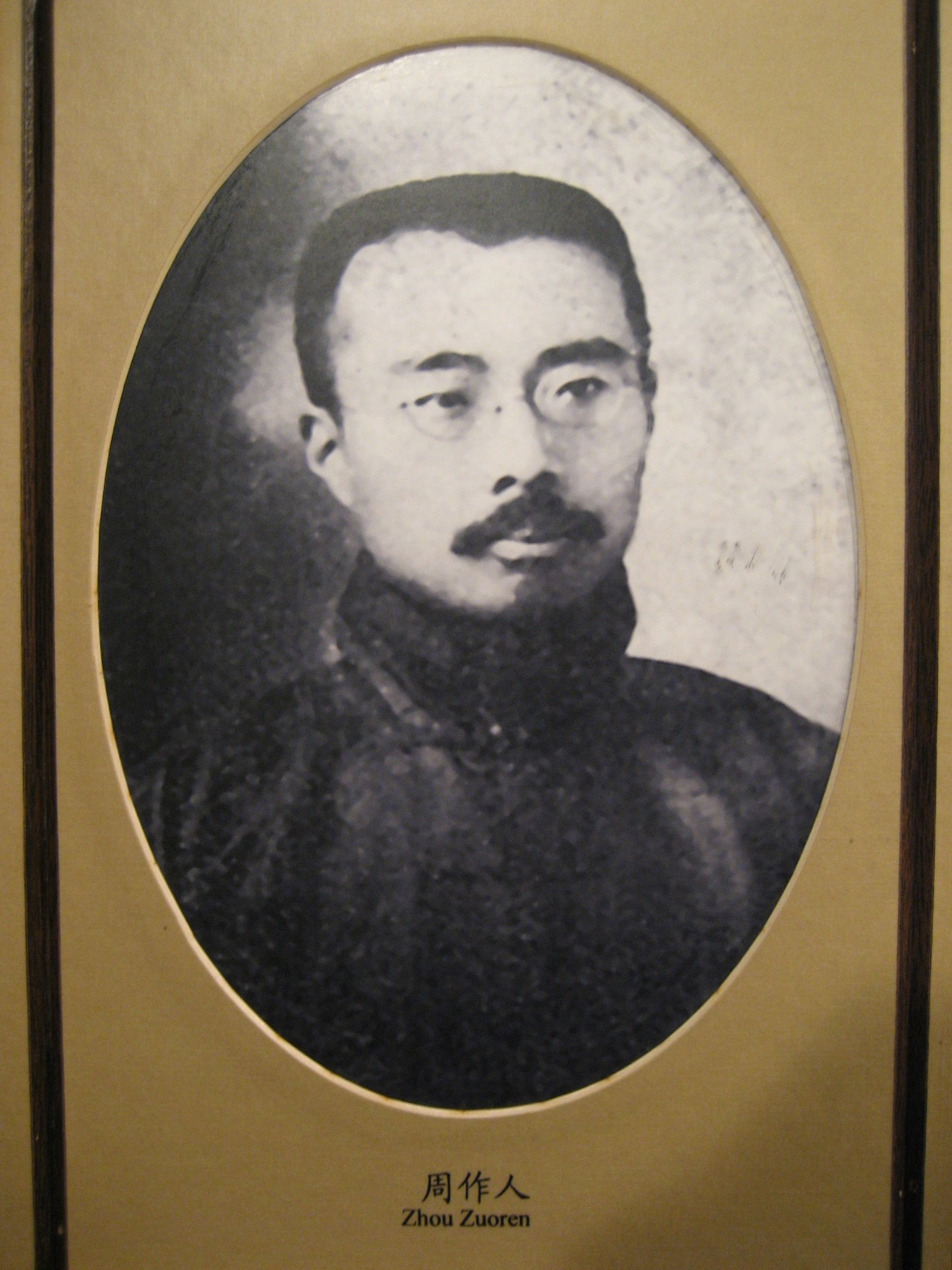
- Born: Zhou Kuishou (周櫆壽); 16 January 1885; Shaoxing, Zhejiang, Qing Empire
- Died: 6 May 1967 (aged 82); Beijing, People's Republic of China
- Occupations: Translator, Essayist
- Partner: Zhou Xinzi (original name: Nobuko Habuto)
- Children: Zhou Fengyi; Zhou Jingzi; Zhou Ruozi
- Parents: Zhou Boyi (father); Lu Rui (mother)
- Relatives: Zhou Shuren (elder brother); Zhou Jianren (younger brother)

Zhou Zuoren (Chinese: 周作人; pinyin: Zhōu Zuòrén; Wade–Giles: Chou Tso-jen) (16 January 1885 – 6 May 1967) was a Chinese writer and translator.

Zhou, along with his brother Lu Xun, became a prominent figure in the New Culture Movement, during which he was also closely associated with Li Dazhao. In 1923, Zhou broke off relations with Lu Xun and, from the late 1920s onward, advocated an apolitical approach to literature, drawing criticism from left-wing writers. He remained in Japanese-occupied Beijing during World War II and was imprisoned from 1945 to 1949 as hanjian. Following the establishment of the People's Republic of China, Zhou worked as a translator of Japanese and Greek literature at the People's Literature Publishing House, while also contributing to research on Lu Xun. Nevertheless, he remained politically ostracized and was persecuted during the Cultural Revolution. His writings have attracted renewed interest since the 1980s.

== Biography ==
=== Early life ===
Born in Shaoxing, Zhejiang, Zhou was a younger brother of Lu Xun.He was educated at the Jiangnan Naval Academy as a teenager before moving to Japan in 1906, following his brother's footsteps. During his stint in Japan, he began studying Ancient Greek, with the aim of translating the Gospels into Classical Chinese, and attended lectures on Chinese philology by scholar-revolutionary Zhang Binglin at Rikkyo University, though he was supposed to study civil engineering there. He returned to China in 1911, with his Japanese wife, and began to teach at different institutions.

=== During the May Fourth Movement ===
Writing essays in vernacular Chinese for the magazine La Jeunesse, Zhou advocated literary reform, becoming a major figure in the May Fourth Movement and the New Culture Movement.In 1918, Zhou, then a literature professor at Peking University, published an article titled "Human Literature", insisting on mutual understanding and sympathy between each other, and required a "recognition of the existence of the same kind". In the article, he attacked specifically such thematics in literature as children sacrificing themselves for the sake of their parents and wives being buried alive to accompany dead husbands. Meanwhile, Zhou made a distinction between "democratic" and "popular" literature by identifying the former as literature that studies human life rather than written for the common people to read. Zhou condemned elite traditional performances like the Beijing opera. He called it "disgusting," "nauseating," "pretentious" and referred to the singing as "a weird inhuman sound."

In 1923, Zhou and his brother Lu Xun became estranged and never spoke to each other again. Their diaries contain no explanation for the estrangement (and Lu Xun's diaries for the year leading up to the estrangement are the only volume missing in his entire lifetime). One common view is that their respective literary works for the 1920s and 1930s contain hints and hidden messages about the cause of their estrangement, often said to arise from Zhou's marriage to a Japanese woman. Zhou did not attend Lu Xun's 1936 funeral.

During the 1920s and 1930s, Zhou was one of the most influential writers in China, particularly in the genre of prose essays.

=== Later life ===
During the Second Sino-Japanese War, Zhou remained in Beijing was seen as a collaborator with the Japanese occupation, and has been regarded by some Japanese as one of the three Chinese in modern times who "truly understands Japan". In 1945, Zhou was arrested for treason by the Nationalist government of Chiang Kai-shek. He was sentenced to 10 years' imprisonment in 1947. In January 1949, the Nationalist government under acting president Li Zongren released Zhou on bail, and he returned to Beijing. The People's Republic of China retained Zhou on house arrest, with Mao Zedong describing him as a "cultural traitor" for whom house arrest was appropriate because he had not killed anyone.

Over the next 17 years, Zhou continued to translate Japanese and ancient Greek literature into Chinese. While on house arrest throughout the rest of his life, Zhou also worked on his memoirs and helped academic research on Lu Xun.During the Hundred Flowers Campaign, Zhou published some of his own work again.

During the Cultural Revolution, the People's Literature Publishing House stopped paying Zhou his royalties, which were his sole source of income. Zhou was also physically abused by Red Guards.

In the early 1980s, interest in Zhou's works re-developed in China and overseas. In contemporary China, he is often regarded as a major literary figure and most of his works have been reprinted and anthologized. In 2001, Qian Liqun (錢理群) published a biography of Zhou.

== Literature Interests ==
He called his studies "miscellanies" and penned an essay titled "My Miscellaneous Studies" (我的雜學). In Tokyo, Zhou developed interests in mythology, anthropology, and what he called ertongxue (兒童學; the study of children development). He later became a translator, producing translations of classical Greek and classical Japanese literatures, including a collection of Greek mimes, Sappho's lyrics, Euripides' tragedies, Kojiki, Shikitei Sanba's Ukiyoburo, Sei Shōnagon's Makura no Sōshi and a collection of Kyogen. He considered his translation of Lucian's Dialogues, which he finished late in his life, as his greatest literary achievement. He was also translated (from English) the story Ali Baba into Chinese (known as Xianü Nu 俠女奴). During the 1930s he was also a regular contributor to Lin Yutang's humor magazine The Analects Fortnightly and wrote extensively about China's traditions of humor, satire, parody, and joking, even compiling a collection of Jokes from the Bitter Tea Studio (Kucha'an xiaohua ji). He became chancellor of Beijing University in 1939.

== Philosophical Stance ==
In his early work, Zhou denied the legitimacy of violence as a force for modernizing China, but rather sought social change and intellectual engagement through nonviolence. Before the 1920s, his literary and philosophical views agreed with the essential aspects of Romanticism, which impulses set him apart from other major literary and intellectual figures as his motives in participating in the New Culture Movement had much less or little to do with any apocalyptic vision or transcendental aspiration. During the May Fourth era, he continued commitment to what he called "individualist humanism", but eventually abandoned this ideology after witnessing increasingly violent tendencies that were out of the idealism of the May Fourth movement. As he wrote in 1926, "class struggle was not a Marxist invention but true as the Darwinian idea of competition for survival". After the May Fourth Movement, Zhou sought to retreat from the nation-building project into individual and ordinary life.

Between 1940 and 1943, Zhou used Confucianism as a guise to argue that the Chinese never had any "thought problem," as the Japanese so claimed. By comparing the Confucianism development in China to a tree, he asserted that "the tree can grow up again if there was no outside interference through either restraint or artificial cultivation." However, after the war, his profuse textual language and artistic attitude were also seen to align with the spirit of Daoism thoughts. In 1944, he explained: "According to my own observations and experience, I have an opinion that is incompatible with the time, which is my two not-to-be-isms. First, I don't want to be a follower; second, I don't want to be a leader. Although I labeled myself a Confucian, this attitude actually belongs to Daoism. However, since I cannot retreat fully, I still have no way to avoid conflicts".

== Bibliography ==
A great number of books about Zhou Zuoren are published in Chinese every year. For basic information about his life and works, see:

- Zhang Juxiang 张菊香 and Zhang Tierong 张铁荣 (eds.) (1986). Zhou Zuoren yanjiu ziliao (周作人硏究资料 "Materials for the study of Zhou Zuoren"). 2 volumes. Tianjin: Tianjin renmin chubanshe.

A character portrait by a contemporary colleague at Peking University:

- Wen Yuan-ning (1934). "Chou Tso-jen: Iron and Grace," in Imperfect Understanding: Intimate Portraits of Modern Chinese Celebrities. Edited by Christopher Rea (Amherst, MA: Cambria Press, 2018), pp. 49–52.

For Western language studies, see:

- Daruvala, Susan (2000). Zhou Zuoren and An Alternative Chinese Response to Modernity. Cambridge, Mass.: Harvard University Asia Center.
- Georges Bê Duc (2010). Zhou Zuoren et l'essai chinois moderne. Paris: L'Harmattan.

Comprehensive editions of his works and translations include:

- Zhi'an 止庵 (ed.) (2002). Zhou Zuoren zibian wenji (周作人自编文集 "Zho Zuroen's essays as arranged by himself"). 34 volumes. Shijiazhuang: Hebei jiaoyu chubanshe.
- Zhong Shuhe 钟叔河 (ed.) (1998). Zhou Zuoren wen leibian (周作人文类编 "Zhou Zuoren's essays as arranged by subject matter"). 10 volumes. Changsha: Hunan wenyi chubanshe.
- Zhou Zhouren (1999–). Kuyuzhai yicong (苦雨斋译丛 "Translations done at the Studio of Uninterrupted Rain"). 12 volumes have appeared. Beijing: Zhongguo duiwai fanyi chuban gongsi.

Some of his essays are available in English:

- Pollard, David (trans.) (2006). Zhou Zuoren, Selected Essays. Chinese-English bilingual edition. Hong Kong: Chinese University Press.
