= Luo Jialun =

Chinese Minister of Education, historian, diplomat and political activist

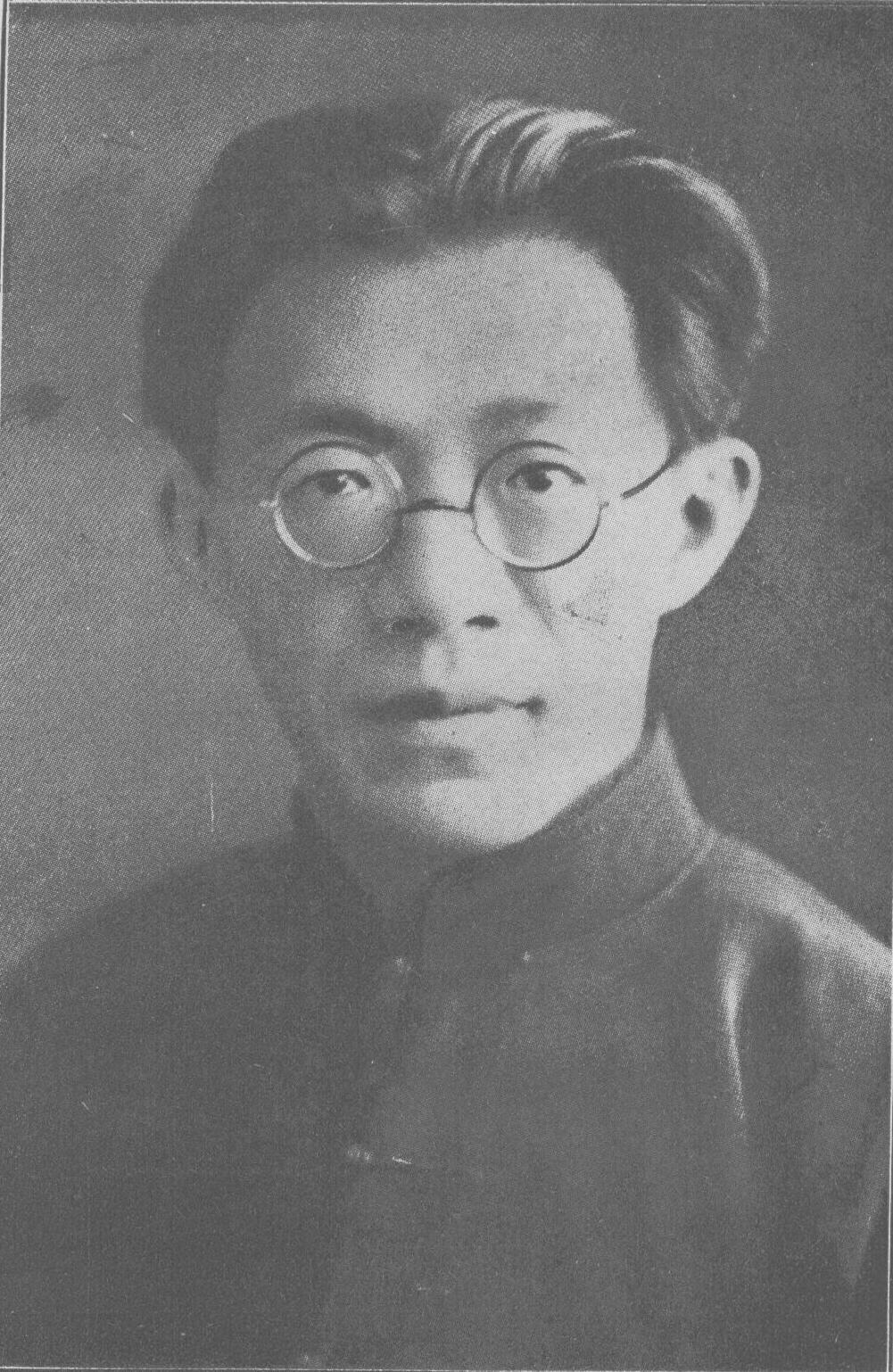
- Born: December 21, 1897; Jiangxi, Qing Dynasty
- Died: December 25, 1969 (aged 72); Taipei, Taiwan

Courtesy name
- Chinese: 志希
Transcriptions
Standard Mandarin
- Hanyu Pinyin: Zhìxī
- Wade–Giles: Chih-hsi

Luo Jialun (traditional Chinese: 羅家倫; simplified Chinese: 罗家伦; pinyin: Luó Jiālún; Wade–Giles: Lo Chia-Luen; December 21, 1897 - December 25, 1969), was the former Chinese Minister of Education, historian, diplomat and political activist. A noted scholar, he was one of the leaders of the May Fourth Movement in 1919. Subsequently, being distinguished as President of various prestigious Chinese universities in the interwar period. In the fall of 1946 he was appointed by the Nationalist Government as China's first Ambassador to India, a full year before India gained sovereignty from the United Kingdom/British Empire. His tenure as Ambassador saw the escalation of the Chinese Civil War and subsequent retreat to Taiwan, of the Nationalist Forces under Chiang Kai-Shek, from whom the Indian Government withdrew diplomatic recognition, according it instead to the victorious Communists under Mao Zedong. Luo remained in India till 1952 when he rejoined his family on Taiwan, where they had retreated with the Nationalists. He continued to live there in his retirement.

On May 29, 2018, the asteroid 204711 Luojialun was named in his honor.

In January 2022, the University of Michigan received a calligraphy collection valued at $12 million as a donation from Jialun's family, making it the largest art donation in the university's history to date

== Biography ==
Luo Jialun was born on December 21, 1897, in Jiangxi to a moderately prosperous family. An industrious and precocious student, he graduated from Peking University in the arts, and subsequently undertook intensive research work in history and philosophy at Princeton, Columbia, London, Berlin and Paris Universities. Returning to China he assumed a prominent role in the "Literary Revolution of 1918 and subsequent May Fourth Movement in 1919 where as through his editorship of the respected journal The Renaissance. Joining the University of Peking he rose to become professor of history in 1926. In 1928 he was appointed President of Tsinghua University serving until 1930.
