= Fu Ssu-nien =

Chinese historian, linguist, and writer (1896–1950)

- 傅斯年
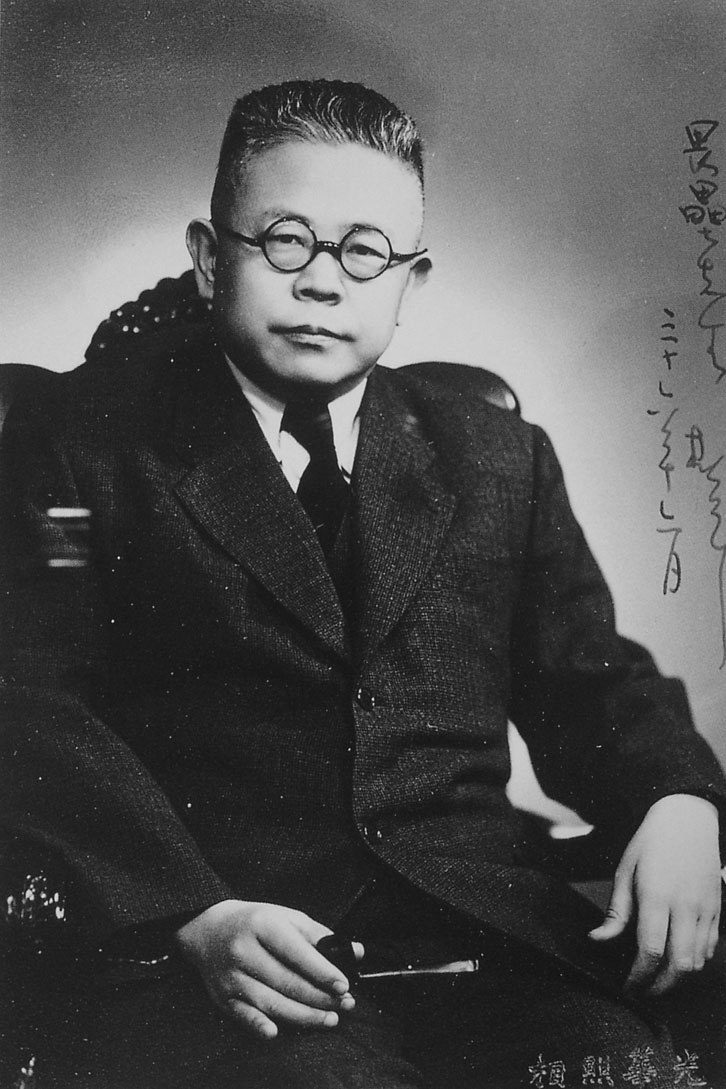
- Born: 26 March 1896; Shandong, Qing China
- Died: 20 December 1950 (aged 54); Taipei, Taiwan, Republic of China
- Education: Peking University; University of Edinburgh; University College London; University of Berlin
- Occupations: Historian; Linguist; Writer

Fu Ssu-nien (Chinese: 傅斯年; pinyin: Fù Sīnián; 26 March 1896 – 20 December 1950) was a Chinese historian, linguist, and writer. He was one of the leaders of the May Fourth Movement in 1919. He was also one of the creators of the Academia Sinica, and was named director of the Institute of History and Philology upon its founding in 1928.

== Early years ==
Fu was born on 26 March 1896 in Shandong, immediately after the First Sino-Japanese War, a time when the traditional systems were being challenged and revolutions were about to happen.

In 1909, Fu entered the secondary school set up by Tianjin government, excelling in mathematics, English, and Chinese. In 1913, Fu was accepted by the preparatory school of Peking University where he ranked first upon graduation in humanities division.

In 1916, Fu went on to the Chinese Department of Peking University to pursue his bachelor's degree. During his time at the university, Fu gradually changed from a conservative to a radical. In 1919, Fu participated in the famous May Fourth Movement and was one of the major students leaders. On the morning of 4 May 1919, Fu led a group of approximately 3,000 students to protest the Chinese government's weak response to the Treaty of Versailles, which ceded the Shandong province to Japan.

In 1920, Fu went to Europe to continue his education. His first stop was University of Edinburgh, but then went on to University College London. Fu registered in the department of Psychology and took most courses at undergraduate level. He also spent a considerable amount of time in medical school courses. In June 1923, Fu traveled to Berlin and studied at Berlin University because the high inflation in Germany after World War I gave him a favorable exchange rate. It seemed that Fu never intended to obtain a B.A degree at these overseas institutions. Instead, he advised his friends to utilize this rare chance to pursue as much learning as possible.

== Academic career ==
In October 1926, Fu accepted an offer from Sun Yat-sen University and joined the faculty of humanities and social science. He became the department head in 1928. On the national scene, he established the Institute of History and Philology (IHP) of Academia Sinica, and remained as director until his death.

In 1929, Fu moved the Institute of History and Philology to Peking and started to teach at Peking University, his alma mater. In 1945, Fu was appointed as acting president of Peking University at the age of 50. In 1946, his second year as the acting president, he excluded many "turncoat" professors who supported the Wang Jingwei government, a puppet government controlled by Japanese forces during World War II. During his term, Fu also recruited many famous scholars at that time, such as Ji Xianlin and Zhu Guangqian.

Fu did not shy away from controversy. After the organization of the path-breaking Yinxu excavations, he published his East Yi West Xia theory about the origin of the Shang dynasty culture in China. This theory is now obsolete, but Fu's approach and techniques were widely influential. He is known due to his pioneering historico-philological research of the concepts of "nature" (xing 性) and "destiny" (ming 命). Rather than making arguments based on philosophy, he developed interpretations proceeding from the archaic morphemes 生 and 令. His condemnation of the Chinese medicine guoyi as being not scientific remains a point of debate. Despite his own call for historical objectivity, Fu opposed the Japanese aggression with the quasi-historical claim that Manchuria and Mongolia were not entitled for independence from China.

In 1947, after witnessing the drastic deterioration of the economy, Fu published three famous articles calling for the resignation of T. V. Soong. Soong resigned some days later due to mounting public pressure. In 1948, Fu attempted suicide but was saved because of the retreat of KMT forces in the civil war. Fu went to Taiwan in the earlier part of 1949. On 20 January 1949, he was appointed President of National Taiwan University. In July, Fu was accused of recruiting faculty members with communist backgrounds. An article published in a local newspaper said that, under Fu's leadership, National Taiwan University had turned into a base for communists. Despite Fu's deep belief in academic freedom, he was forced to compromise his beliefs with the political pressure of the day and fire those scholars alleged to have communist ties.

In December 1950, Fu died in the Taiwan Representative Council at the age of 55 due to hypertension. Soon after answering questions from assembly member Kuo Kuo-chi on 20 December, Fu sat down and said to the assembly's secretary-general Lien Chen-tung, "I'm done! I'm done!", and fell. The announcement of Fu's death by interim assembly chairman Lee Wan-chu the next day caused a protest led by NTU students. Lee stated that "Fu had left this world", but his Hoklo accent made it sound as if Fu had "died of anger" caused by Kuo's questioning.

== Legacy ==
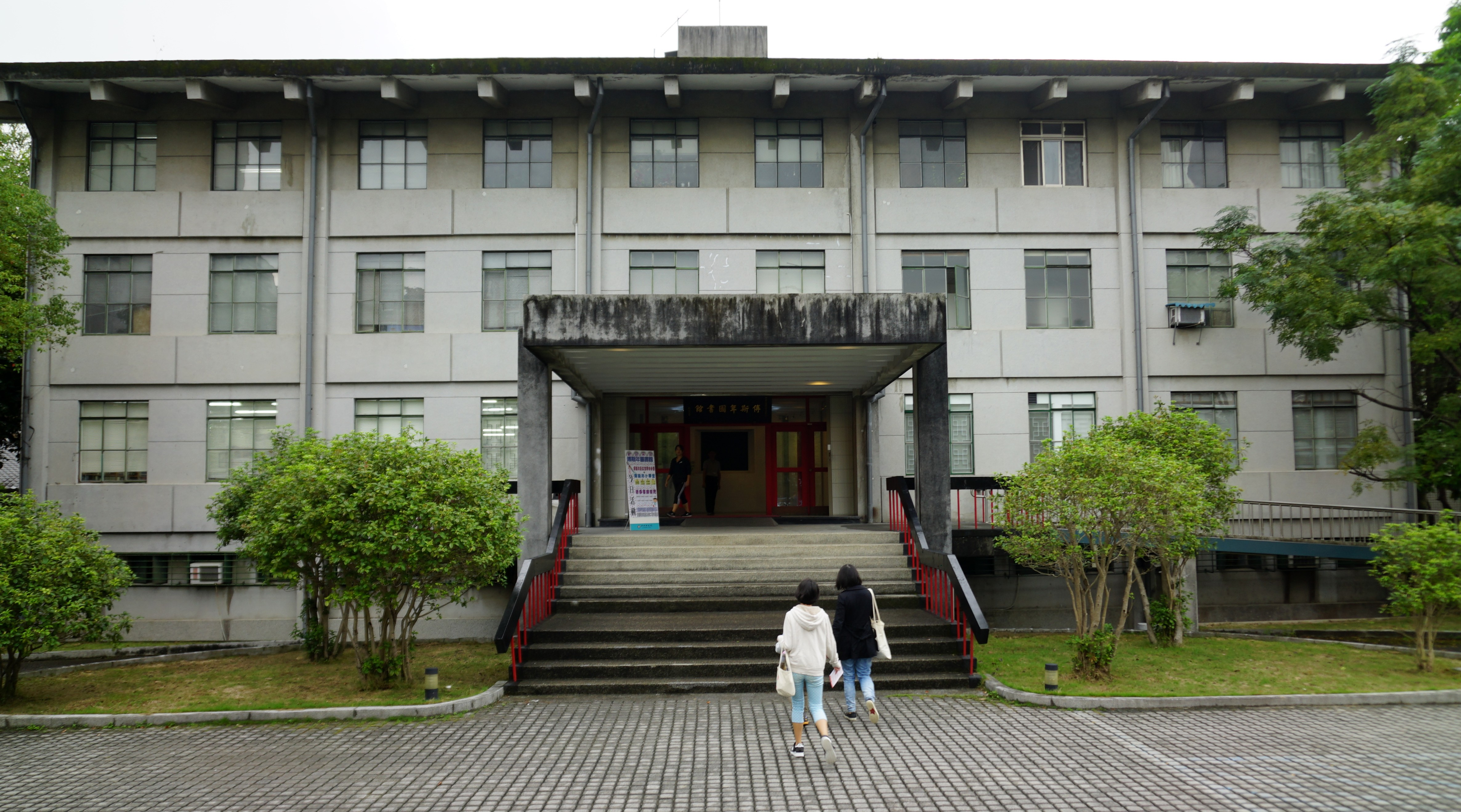
Fu Ssu-nien Library

The Fu Ssu-nien Library of the Institute of History and Philology of the Academia Sinica in Taiwan was named in his honor.

Fu was known for saying, "There are only 21 hours available per day because the remaining three hours are reserved for self-reflection."

Scholar Hu Shih said that Fu Ssu-nien is one of the best educators and charismatic leaders of his time.

== Selected articles written by Fu ==
- 《歷史語言研究所工作之旨趣》(The Life of Working in the Institute of History and Philology) (1928)
- 《周頌說》(Zhou Song)(1928)
- 《大東小東說》(The Story of Da Dong and Xiao Dong) (1930)
- 《論所謂「五等爵」》(Discussion of the Social Stratification) (1930)
- 《姜原》(Jiang Yuan) (1930)
- 《明清史料發刊例言》(The History of Ming and Qing Dynasty) (1930)
- 《夷夏東西說》(East Yi West Xia) (1933)
- 《周東封與殷遺民》(Zhou-Dongfeng and Yin-Yimin) (1934)
- 《自由與平等》(Freedom and Equality) (between 1948 and 1950)
- 《蘇聯究竟是一個什麼國家？》(What is the Soviet Union really like?) (between 1948 and 1950)
- 《我們為什麼要反共？》(Why Are We Anti-communist?) (between 1948 and 1950)
- 《共產黨的吸引力》(The Attraction of the Communist Party) (between 1948 and 1950)
