= Yang Zhensheng =

Chinese educator

Yang Zhensheng (Chinese: 杨振声; pinyin: Yáng Zhènshēng; 24 November 1890 – 7 March 1956) was a Chinese educator and author from Penglai District in Shandong Province. In 1919, Yang and 31 other Peking University (Beida) students participated in the Tiananmen Square protests of 1919. They were arrested by the police for demonstrating outside the home of Cao Rulin, minister of communication and the chief spokesman for Japanese colonial interest in the Chinese government; Yang and the other students were jailed for three days. Yang was considered a "hot-headed radical" in the Beida literature department and stirred the ire of his professors by sharply critiquing Chinese culture. He went on to study personal and behavioural psychology at Columbia University.

Yang and other students from Beida form what would become the New Tide Society (新潮社; Xīncháoshè), a student-organized study society and journal, which was published at a level accessible to middle-school graduates. Yang published under the alias Jinfu (今甫). In New Tide, Yang published the story "The Virgin", about a nineteen-year-old girl forced to marry a clay statue of her husband, who had died after the marriage was arranged by their parents, who ultimately hangs herself in the marriage chamber.

Outside of his writing, Yang was successful as an academic and became the chairman of the Chinese department after the reorganization of Beijing University. He was the president of the National University of Qingdao (now a part of Shandong University) from June 1930 to 1932, appointed by the Nationalist Government's Ministry of Education in Nanjing, which aimed to build up Qingdao as a new centre of learning in the republic. He was the third president of the university and oversaw the copy-editing, at all levels, of school language textbooks. While he was president, he hired the writer Shen Congwen as a lecturer on new literature.

In 1946, Shen, Yang, and Feng Zhi founded a weekly literary supplement to Ta Kung Pao in Tianjin. Yang was a professor at Peking University as of 1945 and continued to be active politically in Changchun 1949. He died in 1956 of an illness.

Academic offices
Preceded by Wang Shoupeng	President of Shandong University; 1930–1932	Succeeded by Zhao Taimou
