= Ye Shengtao =

Chinese writer and politician (1894–1988)

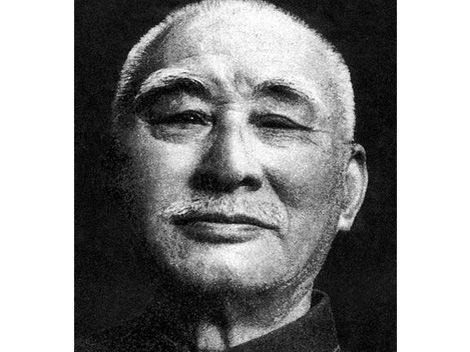
- Traditional Chinese: 葉聖陶
- Simplified Chinese: 叶圣陶
Transcriptions
Standard Mandarin
- Hanyu Pinyin: Yè Shèngtáo
- Wade–Giles: Yeh Sheng-t'ao

Ye Shengtao (28 October 1894 – 16 February 1988) also known as Ye Shaojun, was a Chinese writer, journalist, educator, publisher and politician. He was a founder of the Association for Literary Studies (文學研究會), the first literature association during the May Fourth Movement in China. He served as the Vice-Minister of Culture of the People's Republic of China.

== Early life ==
Ye was born on 28 October 1894 in Wu County, Jiangsu province. His name at birth was Ye Shaojun (葉紹鈞), and his courtesy name was Bingchen (秉臣). His father worked as a bookkeeper for a landlord and they lived a very modest life. When he was six years old, he entered a mediocre school for primary study. He often followed his father to work. He travelled around the city and experienced the lives of the poor.

In 1907, Ye entered Caoqiao Secondary School (草橋中學). After his graduation, he worked as a primary school teacher, before being dismissed by the school in 1914. Finding himself unemployed, he devoted himself entirely to writing classical Chinese novels, which were published in "Libailiu Magazine" (《禮拜六》 "Saturday Magazine"), until he found work as the Chinese teacher of a school set up by the Shanghai Commercial Press (商務印書館上海印刷廠). At the same time, he became the editor of primary textbooks of the Shanghai Commercial Press in 1915.

Ye had been living in an era of instability, including the 1894 Sino-Japanese War, the Hundred Days' Reform, and later the Sphere of Influence (列強割據). His early life experiences affected his sense of nationalism and contributed to his later career as a journalist and an educator.

== Career ==
Under the influences of the May Fourth Movement in 1919 commonly known as the New Culture Movement, Ye indulged himself in his literary career. He participated in a student organization called 'Xinchao She' ("New Tide Society" 新潮社 1919-1920) of Peking University, and started publishing fictions, poems, prose, literary criticism and scripts of drama etc. Ye was also an editor in PuShe (樸社, 1923). In 1921, Ye, Mao Dun and Zheng Zhenduo founded the earliest literary society of the New Literature Movement, the "Wenxue Yanjiu Hui", (文學研究會 "Association for Literary Studies"), advocating realism art but rejecting the principle "Art is for Art's Sake".

=== Life as a journalist ===
Ye had spent much of his life on editing and publishing. The Shanghai Commercial Press was the starting point of Ye's editorship. He became the editor of the press since 1923.

By the end of 1930, Ye quit the post in the Shanghai Commercial Press and became the editor of Kaiming Press (Kaiming Shu Dian 開明書店). He started to edit books on Chinese language and storybooks for children.

In 1936, Ye, Mao Dun and Hong Shen (洪深) established the "Chinese Literature and Art Society" (Zhongguo Wenyi jia Xiehui 中國文藝家協會). In 1941, he became an editorial committee of the "Teaching for Literature and History" (Wenshi Jiaoxue 文史教學). Ye was one of the establishers of the "Literary Alliance for Anti-Japanese Imperialism" (文藝界反帝抗日大聯盟).

Ye devoted himself to editing and publishing for his whole life. During the Second Sino-Japanese War, Ye moved to Leshan with his family and worked as a professor at the Department of Chinese at Wuhan University. In 1946, he returned to Shanghai and resumed his editorship at Kaiming Press.

=== The establishment of The Truth Daily ===
On 30 May 1925, a bloody massacre took place in Shanghai, known as May Thirtieth Movement (五卅運動 Wǔsà- yùndòng). About 2000 Shanghai workers and students protested against it. British police then suppressed the demonstrators with violence and killed 12 Chinese in the event. Till 1 June, more than 20 Chinese were killed.

None of the Shanghai newspapers reported this incident. Ye denounced their silence and founded Gōnglǐ Rìbào (The Truth Daily 《公理日報》) with Zheng Zhenduo and Hu Yuzhi (胡愈之1896－1986) in response.

In addition to reporting the truth, The Truth Daily 《公理日报》provided a forum for public discussion, called "Shèhuì Cáipànsuǒ" ("Tribunal of the Society"〈社會裁判所〉), which encouraged reader to express their viewpoints towards the society. Ye and other editors of The Truth Daily severely criticized the unfairness of the society.

Due to financial difficulties and disagreement among the editors, The Truth Daily finally terminated after running for 22 days.

== Contribution to literature ==
Ye advocated the standardization of modern Chinese language including the standardization of grammar, rhetoric, vocabulary, punctuation, simplified character, and the elimination of variant characters (異體字). He also compiled and standardized the Chinese character for publishing and formulated the Chinese Phoneticization Scheme (Hanyu Pinyin Fang'an 《漢語拼音方案》).

Ye also promoted vernacular Chinese in publishing. His magazines and newspapers were mostly published in vernacular style, which greatly facilitated other journalists and readers to read.

Ye was also an educator who educated many outstanding young authors and editors like Ba Jin, Ding Ling, and Dai Wangshu.

Realism became the most sustainable hallmark of Ye Shengtao. Many of the protagonists in Ye's works were the exploited, the disabled and the prosecuted who were in lower social class. He expressed his democratic and socialist ideas through his novel series such as "The Fire" (Huozai 《火災》), "Under the Horizon"(Xiàn xià 《線下》) and "A scarecrow" (Dào cao rén 《稻草人》). These pieces focused on the suffocation of the lower-class people. His highly praised fiction "Ni Huanzhi" 《倪煥之 》 revealed the pathetic life of an intellectual called "Ni Huanzhi".

Ye's first academic essay was about children's literature, called Children's Concept (兒童之觀念), criticizing how feudalism affected children's lives in China.

His writing The Scarecrow (Dào cǎo rén 《稻草人》) was published in 1923. This children's reading was very popular among numerous youngsters. Another 'fairy tale was "A Stone Figure of an Ancient Hero". (Gǔdāi yīngxióng de shíxiàng 《古代英雄的石像》) This story was about a stone which had been sculpted into a hero statue.

Ye's student, Ding Ling, once praised that his fairy tales were able to induce readers to think more about the society.

The popular writer Zhao Jingshen (趙景深) held that Ye was a special figure in the field of literature, describing him transcendent and extraordinary.

== Political life ==
Ye was responsible for a number of posts in the authority. Following the Communist Revolution, Ye served as the Vice-director of General Administration of Press and Publication (出版總署副署長), the President of People Education Publication (人民教育出版社社長), and the Vice-Minister of Education. He was also elected as the Committee of the Fifth Standing Committee of the National People's Congress, the National Committee of The Fifth Chinese People's Political Consultative Conference (CPPCC), and the Chairman of China Association for Promoting Democracy.

Ye died in Beijing on 16 February 1988 at the age of 93.

== Works ==
=== Literature ===
- "The Snowing Morning" Xuě zhāo 《雪朝》 (co-written with Zhu Ziqing etc.) (Poems) 1922
- A Scarecrow Dào cǎo rén 《稻草人》 (Novel) 1923
- "Under the horizon" Xiàn xià 《線下》 (Short stories) 1925
- "Ní Huànzhī (the name of the character)" 《倪煥之》 (Novel) 1929
- "A Stone Figure of an Ancient Hero" Gǔ dài yīng xióng de shí xiàng. 《古代英雄的石像》 (Fairy-tales) 1931 .
- "The Heart of Literature" Wén xīn 《文心》 (Educational) 1934 (co-written with Xia Mianzun 夏丏尊)
- An Exercise in Weiyanju" Wèi yàn jū xí zuò 《未厭居習作》 (Prose) 1935
- "The Collections of Ye Shengtao's Short Stories" Shèngtáo duǎn piān xiǎo shuō jí 《聖陶短篇小說集》 (Short Stories collections) 1936
- "Selected Collections of Ye Shengtao" Yè Shàojūn xuǎn jí 《葉紹鈞選集》 (Collectanea) 1936
- "A Guide to Skimming" Luè dú zhǐ dǎo jǔ yù 《略讀指導舉隅》1946, (co-written with Zhu Ziqing)
- "The Study of Fairy Tales" értóng Wénxué Yánjiū 《兒童文學研究》1947
- "A Guide to Intensive Reading" Jīng dú zhǐ dǎo jǔ yù 《精讀指導舉隅》 1948
- "Recordings of Writing" Xiě zuò zá tán 《寫作雜談》 1951
- "Selected fairy-tales of Ye" Yè Shèngtáo tónghuà xuǎn 《葉聖陶童話選》 (Fairy-Tale) 1956
- "Ye Shengtao's Collectanea" Yè Shèngtáo chūbǎn wénjí.《葉聖陶出版文集》1958
- "Resistance" Kàng zhēng 《抗爭》 (Short stories) 1959
- "The Night" Yè 《夜》 1959
- "An ordinary story"《Píng cháng de gù shì 《平常的故事》 1959
- "Light wave" Wēi bō 《微波》 1959
- "The Collection of Poems" Qiè cún jí 《篋存集》 (Poems) 1960
- "Mr Pan Weathered the Storm" Pān xiān shēng zài nàn zhōng 《潘先生在難中》 (Short Stories) 1964
- "Ye Shengtao's Proses" Yè Shèngtáo Sǎnwén 《葉聖陶散文》 (Proses) 1983
- "I & Sichuan" Wǒ yǔ Sìchuān 《我與四川》 (proses & poems) 1984
- "The Speaking of Literary works" Wén zhāng jiǎnghuà 《文章講話》 (co-written with Xia Mianzun 夏丏尊) (Educational) 1997
- "72 Topics about Literature" Wén huà qī shí èr jiǎng 《文話七十二講》 (Educational) 1999, (co-written with Xia Mianzun 夏丏尊)

=== Journalism ===
- "Saturday Magazine" Lǐbàiliù Magazine《禮拜六》
- "Shanghai News of Current Affairs" Shànghǎi Shíshì Xīnbào《上海時事新報》
- "Shanghai Nationalists' Daily" Shànghǎi Mínguó Rìbào 《上海民國日報》
- "The Literature Weekly" Wénxué Zhōubào 《文學周報》
- "The Truth Daily" Gōnglǐ Rìbào 《公理日報》
- "The Chinese Language and Literature Monthly" Guówén Yuèkān《國文月刊》
- "Suzhou Commentary" Sūzhōu Pínglùn 《蘇州評論》
- "Women's Magazine" Fùnǚ Zázhì 《婦女雜誌》
- "Novel Monthly" Xiǎoshuō Yuèbào 《小說月報》
- "High School Students" Zhōngxuéshēng 《中學生》
- "Enlightened Youth" Kāimíng Shàonián 《開明少年》
- "Chinese Authors" Zhōngguó Zuòjiā 《中國作家》
- "People's Education" Rénmín Jiàoyù 《人民教育》
- "Chinese Language" Zhōngguó Yǚwén 《中國語文》
- "Poems" Shī 《詩》
- "The Light" Guangming 《光明》
- "Chinese Language Magazine" Guowen Zazhi (《國文雜誌》)
- "Magazine for High School Students in the War". Zhongxuesheng Zhanshi Banyue kan (《中學生戰時半月刊》)

== Ye Shengtao Memorial Hall ==
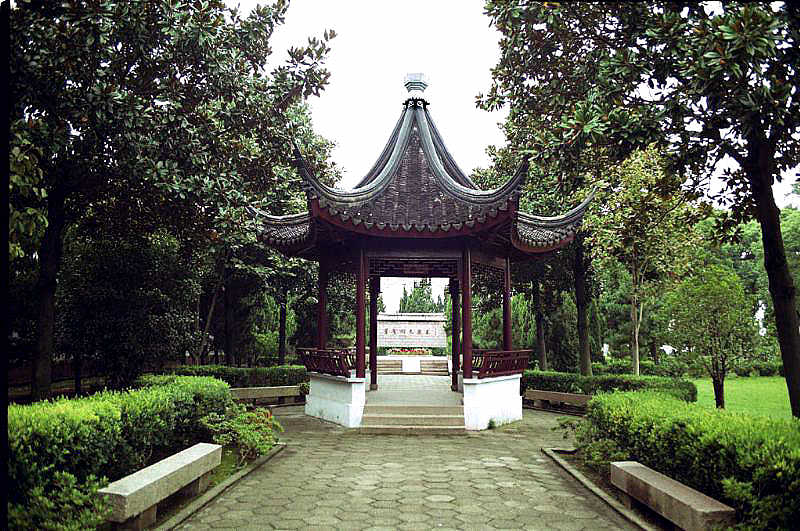
Ye Shengtao Memorial Park in Luzhi town

Ye Shengtao Memorial Hall is located at the former site of The 5th High School where Ye Shengtao taught from 1917 to 1922. It is located beside the Baosheng Temple in Luzhi township, Wuzhong district of Suzhou city.
