= Ho-Kau Chan =

Chinese actress and Cantonese opera singer from Hong Kong (1932–2021)

- Chinese: 陳好逑
- Born: 1932; Hong Kong
- Died: 23 July 2021 (aged 88–89); Hong Kong
- Other names: Chan Hao-Gau, Chan Ho-Kau, Chan Hiu-Kau, Chen Ho-Kaw
- Occupations: Cantonese opera singer film actress
- Years active: Since before 1940
- Father: Chan Kai-hung

Chinese name
- Traditional Chinese: 陳好逑
- Simplified Chinese: 陈好逑
Transcriptions
Yue: Cantonese
- Jyutping: can^{4} hou^{3} kau^{4}
- Musical career
- Genres: Cantonese opera Peking opera
- Instrument: Voice
- Formerly of: Hing Sun Sing Opera Troupe (Chinese: 慶新聲; Jyutping: hing^{3}san^{1}sing^{1}) Chung San Sing Opera Troupe (Chinese: 頌新聲; Jyutping: zung^{6}san^{1}sing^{1}) Ho Siu Lin Opera Troupe (Chinese: 好兆年; Jyutping: hou^{2}siu^{6}nin^{4}) since 1997
Taoism, Ching Chung Koon
- 「法號」上文 (Taoist name)

Ho-Kau Chan (Chinese: 陳好逑; 1932 – 23 July 2021) was a Hong Kong actress and Cantonese opera singer. She was credited with over 130 films.

== Early life ==
In 1932, Chan was born in Hong Kong. Chan's ancestral hometown is Panyu district, Guangzhou, Guangdong province. Her given name at birth has a well-known meaning and therefore special pronunciation (Chinese: 好逑; Jyutping: hou^{3} kau^{4}) among scholars.

Chan's father, Chan Kai-hung, founded the Kwok Sing Theatre where she was a student first under Pak Kit-Cho (born Ha Park-Cheung;Chinese: 夏伯祥; Jyutping: haa^{6}baak^{3}coeng^{4}) among a group of tutors while in grade school until the Japanese occupation of Hong Kong in 1941.

After the war, she continued training under Tang Chiu Lan-Fong (Langfong Cantonese Opera School) while in high school and then, as urged by Jiang Ling (江陵) the newspaper editor, mostly under Fen Juhua (aka Fan Guk-Fa) in Chiu Ciu Academy (see John Lone) for over a decade since 1955.

== Career ==
Chan started her Cantonese opera singing career by working her way to the top from humble beginnings, notwithstanding her father's connections. Her choice was well received by veterans including Sit Kok-sin and leading actress Cheung (Chinese: 張舞柳; Jyutping: zoeng^{1}mou^{5}lau^{5}). (Note:- There is no information on record available yet as to how Chan met Sit or Cheung in 1951.)

Chan was on her debut tour overseas (Singapore) in September 1951 with Siu-Lei Chun, Chun's sister and their mother. Eventually, spent months and years in Singapore and Vietnam before earning job offers in Hong Kong to join well-known or established troupes. Starting in 1953, she worked with Chan Kam-tong, a student of Sit, before returning to Vietnam in May 1954 for the last trip that ended in August 1955. Settling down back in Hong Kong, she was hired as the second female lead to work with Lai-Zhen Yu by Ching Wa-Hang(Chinese: 靚華亨; Jyutping: zing^{6}waa^{4}hang^{1}), the female Guan Yu.

Chan became notable and joined the Hing Sun Sing Opera Troupe (慶新聲劇團) in 1962 as a Hua Dan or lead female Cantonese opera singer. She then joined the Chung San Sing Opera Troupe (頌新聲劇團) in 1965 until the male lead retired. Chan is known for her role as a married woman or woman warrior opposite this particular co-lead generally.

As an agile, experienced matriarch during the United States tour in 1967, Chan managed to pick up where this male lead left off. The mixed crew, of both local backgrounds and from Hong Kong like Chan, continued onto a second term contract to work for months while waiting for Yam Kim Fai and Bak Sheut Sin to arrive in 1968. To tie over, she worked with a very senior retired performer(father of Lowell Lo) in Seattle, then a younger Hong Kong performer who was originally scheduled to be the next male lead but arrived without his co-lead, having herself invited another male lead from Hong Kong to join her.

Chan is otherwise also known for Huashan (lively girl) roles such as Hongniang, Tam Kee-yee and Pan Jinlian on stage opposite generations of various co-leads since 1960. She had similar roles also in 1962 film Battle at Sizhou, for example, as Clam Spirit.

In 1953, Chan crossed over as an actress in Hong Kong films. Chan first appeared in A Battle in An Old City, a 1953 film directed by Chang Mung-Wan. Chan appeared in many Cantonese opera films including as Madam Wong in The Precious Lotus Lamp (1956-1958, three episodes), Love and Hate (aka The Feud) (1956), The Naughty Princess and Her Lover (aka Between You and Me) (1957), and The Fox-Spirit's Romance (aka The Strange Fox) (1957). Chan's last film was Secret Agent No. 1, a 1970 Crime film directed by Walter Tso. Chan was credited with over 130 films.

In 1961 film Three Battles to Secure Peace for Nation, Chan established her woman warrior status opposite future fellow co-lead on stage for the next thirty plus years. Acrobatic pose (Chinese: 紮架) stemmed from fighting scene of this film had become classic movements on stage.

Chan was compared by some to Christa Ludwig.

== Repertoire ==
|*| Chan was the female lead of original cast since 1962 in the following partial list. The show must go on for weeks or months in those years she spent overseas.

	Title	Notes/Ref.
*1	The Battling Sounds	1963 film version
*2	The Pitiless Sword (aka Paragons and Heroism)	1964 film version
*3	Uproar in Jade Hall	
*4	A Chronicle Written in Blood	
*5	Who Should Be the Commander-in-Chief?	
*6	Romance and Hatred	Second debut in 1984, 18 years since first debut
7	Time To Go Home	《胡不歸》
8	The Marriage of the Top Scholar	《花染狀元紅》
9	Enlightenment of Goddess of Mercy (aka From Miaoshan to Guanyin)	Chinese: 《觀音得道》)
10	The Predicament of Zhu Bian's Homecoming	see Discography++
*11	Hongniang the matchmaker in the West Chamber (aka Interrogating the Red Maid)	Debut on stage for 1986 Chinese New Year; By playwright Qin Zhong-ying
*12	Xi Shi	
*13	Zhou Yu (as Xiao Qiao)	Debuted in August 1987, duet included.
14	Fan Lihua Executing Own Son at the Gate	Chinese: 《梨花罪⼦》
*15	Lu Meng-zheng - A Poor Scholar(1998)	
*16	The Riverside Pavilion (as Tam Kee-yee)	See Guan Hanqing
*17	The Return of Lady Wenji (as Lady Wenji)	See Cai Yan
*18	The Three Sieges of Zhu Village (Chinese: 《三打祝家莊》) as Wu Sam Neung	By playwright Poon Cheuk in 1971.
*19	Theft of the Red Pongee (Chinese: 《夜盜紅綃》) as Miss Hung Siu	Lam Kam-tong (Chinese: 林錦堂) as Kunlun Nu, the character Sit had. By playwright Poon Cheuk in 1972.
*20	Mirror of the Universe	a.k.a. The Cosmic Mirror
*21	Judge Yin (of Hell) and Judge Yang (on Earth), aka Judge of Hell and Guillotine Judge	An episode of Peking opera collection Zha Panguan in Cantonese opera debuted in 1999.
22	The Dream Encounter Between Emperor Wu of Han and Lady Wa	
23	Wang Bao Chuan (see Lady Precious Stream)	Title role for female lead, support role for male lead.
24	Sizhou City (Peking opera)	
25	Yin Yang River (Peking opera)	

According to her co-lead in Ho Siu Lin Opera Troupe, Chan had a habit of not speaking up to playwrights even when she did not like the scripts. (Chinese: 唔鐘意唔出聲。) Lu Meng-zheng - A Poor Scholar from 1998 returned a few times while the debut was funded by HK Arts Festival.

Some playwrights only found their scripts not returning to stage for over a decade or decades. Other playwrights never realized because they died soon after the debut. For example, Ho Siu Lin Opera Troupe debuted two more scripts in 1998, Yu Zhou Feng (Chinese: 《宇宙鋒》; 蘇翁<1932－2004>) in July and A Thorn Hairpin (Chinese: 《王⼗朋臨江祭荊釵》; 葉紹德<1930－2009>) in November, without public funding.

== Filmography ==
=== Films ===
This is a partial list.

- 1953 A Battle in an Old City
- 1956 The Precious Lotus Lamp - Madam Wong (wife of the male lead character)
- 1956 Love and Hate (a.k.a. The Feud)
- 1957 The Naughty Princess and Her Lover (a.k.a. Between You and Me)
- 1957 The Precious Lotus Lamp (The Sequel) - Madam Wong
- 1957 The Fox-Spirit's Romance (a.k.a. The Strange Fox)
- 1958 The Precious Lotus Lamp (Part 3, Concluding Episode) - Madam Wong
- 1958 A Buddhist Recluse for 14 Years (as Lu Qiao Chinese: 綠翹)
- 1958 The Tragic Story of Liang Shanbo and Zhu Yingtai (a.k.a. Butterfly Lovers, as the maid Rén Xīn Chinese: 人心)
- 1959 Hell or Paradise (as Lam Ah Ching, reflecting the debut overseas in 1951)
- 1959 Tragedy of the Emperor's Daughter (film adaptation of The Flower Princess)
- 1959 Fan of Fragrant Wood (as maid, the matchmaker)
- 1960 Spring Lamps Festival (as Sheung Siu-chong)
- 1960 Ten Schoolgirls (vocal & as always "food in the mouth and sleep" girl)
- 1961 Three Battles to Secure Peace for Nation
- 1961 Leung Hung Yuk's Victory at Wong Tin Tong (as Han Soeng-tak, elder son of Han Shizhong)
- 1961 Female General Mrs. Yang
- 1961 Secret Book (Part 1, Part 2) (a.k.a. The Magic Crane) - Lee Ching Luen
- 1962 Secret Book (Part 3, Concluding Episode)
- 1962 Knight of the Victory Marked Flag (a.k.a. Banners of Victory)
- 1962 Battle at Sizhou (as Clam Spirit opposite Fan Guk-Fa, her master)
- 1962 The Royal Wedding in the Palace (as Ying Ying, the head Lady-in-waiting)
- 1963 The Battling Sounds
- 1963 The Iron Wild Goose (Part 1)
- 1963 The Iron Wild Goose (Part 2)
- 1963-64 The Golden Hairpin (Part 1-4), a.k.a. Jade Hairpin Oath by Wolong Sheng (credited as gam^{1} tung^{4})
- 1964 The Pitiless Sword
- 1965 Moslem Sacred Fire Decree (Part 1, Part 2 Concluding Episode)
- 1965 Wu-lin-di-yi-jian (the sequel)
- 1965 Story of the Sword and the Sabre (Part 3, Part 4)
- 1966 Night of the Opera Stars (a.k.a. Goddess of Mercy Celebrates Her Birthday at Xiang Shan) – Documentary

== Theater Performance ==
=== Since 1940 ===
==== Hong Kong ====
- 1949, Myrica Branch Troupe (Chinese: 「一枝梅粵劇團」)
- 1949, Wah Tak Leisure Amusement (Chinese: 「華德業餘游樂社」)
- 1953, Troupes Chan Kam-tong performed including Hung Wan Opera Troupe in Red Strawberry and a Broken Heart and Da Hao Cai Opera Troupe with Sun Ma Sze Tsang or He Fei Fan as male lead.
- 1957, Kok Sing Troupe in July

- Lady White Snake, as second lead actress (Lady Green Snake, Chinese: ⼩青)
- Spotlight

==== Abroad ====
- 1959, Former Singapore Badminton Hall with Ho Fei-Fan(Chinese: 何非凡)

- Nanyang Siang Pau articles indicate that Chan as the female lead of this troupe prepared for the following night performance after finishing that night performance. Chan worked with her supporting female lead until 4am before going to bed. This tour was well received and the supporting actress joined Chan for the 1967 tour.

=== Since 1960 ===
==== Hong Kong ====
As Hua Dan or lead female actress since 1962 in:-

- Hing Sun Sing Opera Troupe (慶新聲劇團)
- Chung San Sing Opera Troupe (頌新聲劇團)

==== Abroad ====
1967, Kun Lun Troupe (Chinese: 崑崙劇團)

1) Repertoire/titles
- #1 to #8 listed above (See § Repertoire)
- Beauty Fades From Twelve Ladies' Tower
- Goddess of the Luo River
- Wang Bao Chuan
- The Dream Encounter Between Emperor Wu of Han and Lady Wa
- Liang Zhu Hen (Chinese: 梁祝恨)
- Return of the Swallows
- A Serenade
- The Smile of a Beauty
- Mò lù xiāo láng
- Qián chéng wàn lǐ (revised)
- Others
2) A crew of mixed backgrounds for this United States tour.
- Yue Gaai while the organizer mentioned a different name as the next male lead, according to press report.
- Actress Cheung, Chan first met in early 1950s.
- Chi Yau Chung (which means Freedom Bell, teacher of Mak Bing-wing)
- Siu-Lei Chun, Chan worked in her 1951-52 crew as career debut overseas.

- not listed in the two 1968 San Francisco postbills now kept in library.
- July 1968 postbills regarding performance at Victory Theatre of Los Angeles had Li Qian (Chinese: 黎謙) as Advisor and Lai-Zhen Yu was listed for guest appearances.

- Others

1968, Lo Hoi Tin and Madam Choo Sow Yin with the Yat Sing Music Club (Portland) as invited after San Francisco performance during Lunar New Year.

=== Since 1970 ===
==== Hong Kong ====
1971–1972, Chan Kam-tong Opera Troupe (Kam Tim Fa) and his student So Siu-tong (Chinese: 蘇少棠), playwright Poon Cheuk (Chinese: 潘焯).

- The Three Sieges of Zhu Village, aka Peking Opera sān dǎ zhù jiā zhuāng, Chinese: 《三打祝家莊》, as Wu Sam Neung
- Theft of the Red Pongee, as Miss Hung Siu (meaning red pongee).
- Recording in 1936 of Sit Kok-sin opposite Qián Li Ju who played Miss Hung Siu, was from Brunswick Records (Chinese: 鶴鳴), with title Kunlun Nu Theft of the Red Pongee (Chinese: 《崑崙奴夜盜紅綃》).
- Mak Bing-wing starred a 1940 film written by Nam Hoi Sap-Sam Long (Chinese: 《夜盜紅綃》).
- Wong Chin-sui performed a version on stage in 1949 with Law Lai Kuen. The Troupe called Tai Qián Chéng (Chinese: 「大前程劇團」) was in Macau.
- Finale performance in Ko Shing Theatre before its closure on 16 March 1972.

==== Abroad ====
1975, Diamond Troupe (Chinese: 鑽⽯劇團) North America tour with Lam Kam-tong (Chinese: 林錦堂)

- Advertised schedule for first week
- Advertised schedule for another four days plus Six States Installation of Minister but cross-dressed.
- In 1975, Chan with a crew of mostly young up-and-coming Hong Kong performers, 7 days extended to 11 days. The Golden Harvest Theater event at 285 Spadina Avenue was profitable and encouraging to the organizer in Toronto. She was recommended to perform in Toronto by then 1967 owner/operator of Chuan Kung Music Palace Theatre (Chinese: 璇宮戲院) in New York which punished Lam for trying to replace Chan when he felt his thunder stolen in San Francisco, first stop of 1967 tour, Lam's debut tour overseas.
- In 1984 and 1986, Chan was again invited to build a troupe for May/June North America tour. When she asked to have Lam as co-lead, the organizer declined.

=== Since 1980 ===
- 1984, Chinese Opera Fortnight

Title	In Chinese
Time to Go Home	《胡不歸》
The Sounds of Battle (a.k.a. The Battling Sounds, 1963 film version)	《雷鳴金鼓戰笳聲》
Romance and Hatred	《三夕恩情廿載仇》
Merciless Sword Under Merciful Heaven (a.k.a. The Pitiless Sword, 1964 film version)	《無情寶劍有情天》

- 1993, A Heartbreaking Reunion (aka Butterfly Lovers)

=== Since 2000 ===
- 2002 Hong Kong Arts Festival presented a series in her honour, entitled The Virtuosity of Chan Ho-kau

Title	In Chinese
The Return of Lady Wenji	《文姬歸漢》
Love in a Time of Bloodshed	《無情寶劍有情天》
The Predicament of Zhu Bian's Homecoming	《朱弁回朝》
Of Love and Enmity (a.k.a. Romance and Hatred)	《三夕恩情廿載仇》
Conspiracy behind the Marriage of Princess Yin Ping	《鐵馬銀婚》

- 2003, opposite Lam Kam-tong (Chinese: 林錦堂), only performed eight shows on seven days from 17 September 2003 to 23 September 2003 as listed below while the scheduled May performances (from 16 May 2003 to 22 May 2003) was canceled due to SARS.

17 September 2003 to 23 September 2003, performed
	Title	In Chinese
Day 1	Two Heroic Families	《蓋世雙雄霸楚城》
Day 2	The Ten-Year Dream	《隋宮十載菱花夢》
Day 3	Time To Go Home	《胡不歸》
Day 4	Xi Shi	《煙雨重溫驛館情》
Day 5	Contending for the Bride (1:45pm)	《搶新娘》
Day 5	The Villain, The General and the Heroic Beauty (7:45pm)	《梟雄虎將美⼈威》
Day 6	The Pitiless Sword	《無情寶劍有情天》
Day 7	The Hero's Blood on Mount Pipa	《枇杷山上英雄血》

16 May 2003 to 22 May 2003, Canceled.
	Title	In Chinese
Day 1	Hongniang	《多情君瑞俏紅娘》
Day 2	The Ten-Year Dream	《隋宮十載菱花夢》
Day 3	Who Should Be the Commander-in-Chief? (1:45pm)	《龍鳳爭掛帥》
Day 3	Xi Shi (7:45pm)	《煙雨重溫驛館情》
Day 4	The Predicament of Zhu Bian's Homecoming	《朱弁回朝》
Day 5	The Pitiless Sword	《無情寶劍有情天》
Day 6	Lin Chong	《林冲》
Day 7	Hongniang	《多情君瑞俏紅娘》

- 2004 The Villain, The General and the Heroic Beauty on 1 December 2004 in a series named Showcase of masterpieces by master playwrights of the yearly event Bravo! A Cantonese Opera Fiesta!

=== Since 2010 ===
- 2011-2017 mainly in Sunbeam Theatre, Guanyin and Pan Jinlian (by playwright Li Kui-ming)
- 2016 Sacrificing the Son
- 2017 Excerpt, Pan Jinlian Seducing Her Brother-in-law (Chinese: 《金蓮戲叔》)
- 2018 Judge Yin (of Hell) and Judge Yang (on Earth), aka Judge of Hell and Guillotine Judge, Chan debuted in 1999, an episode of Peking opera collection Zha Panguan in Cantonese opera.
- 2018 The Return of Lady Wenji

== Discography ==
- 2010, Ai Shui Jiang He (Chinese: 《愛水江河》; Jyutping: oi^{3}seoi^{2}gong^{1}ho^{4}), by Fu Zheng Tang.
- 1993, Shen Sanbai and Wife Yun (see Shen Fu, Six Records of a Floating Life), by Fung Hang Record Ltd. (FHCD-4025), 1979 first edition.
- 1992, Farewell to Zhu Bian upon his departure, a fund raising, Haven of Hope Christian Service (Hong Kong) by playwright Qin Zhongying.
- 1980, A Wedding in the Dream, aka Mei Lanfang's Remorse at Death, by Tien Shing Records (TSLP 2156)
- 1978, Gao Junbao si tan ying fang (TSLP 2150)
- 1977, Justice Bao versus Chen Shimei and Qin Xianglian, by Tien Shing Records (TSLP 2142)
- 1977, Martial Heroes, by Tien Shing Records (TSLP 2130)
- 1969, Hongniang Interrogated (Chinese: 《⻤⾺紅娘》), by Fung Hang Record Ltd.
- 1958, Yellow Fat Dog & The Wolf (Chinese: 《肥⿈狗與⿈⿏狼》), by Tang Ti-sheng.
- 1953, A Beggar's Life for Me (Chinese: 《做慣乞兒懶做官》)

++「公主 我朱弁恨難當面拜辭。」(Zhu Bian responded) is a line unique in this 1992 release for fundraising with Xiaofeng Chen. (This version of Farewell to Zhu Bian is however one of a few released in various formats opposite various singers over the course of about six decades since Xiaofeng Chen(Chinese: 陳笑風) included the story in his repertoire. Some versions have titles, lyrics and melodies very similar to this one. There is no published lyrics about 1992 version for unknown reason.)

The second song is one of a few about the same ("Tale of the Pipa" or "The Story of the Lute") story.

== Awards ==
- 2006 Honorary Fellow. The Hong Kong Academy for Performing Arts.
- 2008 MH for her achievements in Cantonese Opera.

== Eulogy ==
A short eulogy referred to Madam Wong, a character Chan portrayed in 2016, six decades since making those three films very early in her career. In Sacrificing the Son, a Cantonese Opera performance, Chinese Opera Festival 2016, Chan as Madam Wong demonstrated the traditional value instituted into a maiden in a rich and influential family ( Chinese: 大家閨秀 ) even while seeing, beaten to death, the son she gave birth to and keeping safe the other son of her husband. The journalist found these same quality in Chan.
