= Ming Chee Sing Chinese Opera Troupe =

Ming Chee Sing Chinese Opera Troupe (Chinese: 鳴芝聲劇團) is one of the top Cantonese Opera troupes in Hong Kong. The troupe was founded in 1990 by Lau Kam Yiu (劉金耀) to promote a young opera talent, Joyce Koi Ming Fai (蓋鳴暉). Lau himself, a retired businessman, later took over the management of Ming Chee Sing.

After the demise of Lau Kam Yiu in 2011, Ming Chee Sing Chinese Opera Troupe came under the management of his daughter, Lau Kok Ying (劉幗英). The Troupe now performs at least 100 shows a year in many countries including the United States, Canada, England, Australia, Japan, China, Singapore, Macau, etc. It celebrated its 25th anniversary in October 2015.

== Members ==
=== Leading male ===
Koi Ming Fai is the ‘man mou sang’ (leading male) of Ming Chee Sing. She is a popular and well-known opera male impersonator, and the god-daughter cum disciple of Cantonese Opera maestro Lam Kar Sing (林家聲). Since 1995, she has also acted in several Hong Kong TV dramas. In 2001, she was awarded as one of the Ten Outstanding Young Persons in Hong Kong.

At first, Koi Ming Fai partnered her classmate Zong Yun Sin (莊婉仙). The two of them were both trained at the Cantonese Opera Academy of Hong Kong (八和粵劇學院). After the initial performances, an experienced actress Wan Fei Yin (尹飛燕), was recruited to take over as the leading lady.

=== Current leading actress ===
Since November 1994, Ng May Ying (吳美英), a renowned leading actress, is the stage partner of Koi Ming Fai. Their 21 years’ partnership is a record in Cantonese Opera circle. They are considered to be ‘The perfect pair’ by many Cantonese opera fans.

== Operas ==
The operas performed by Ming Chee Sing are mostly famous plays of Yam Kim Fai /Bak Sheut Sin (任白戲寶), well-known operas of Lam Kar Sing (林派名), and those written by Li Kui Ming (李居明).
