= Belilios Public School =

School in Hong Kong

Coordinates: 22.2849°N 114.1932°E

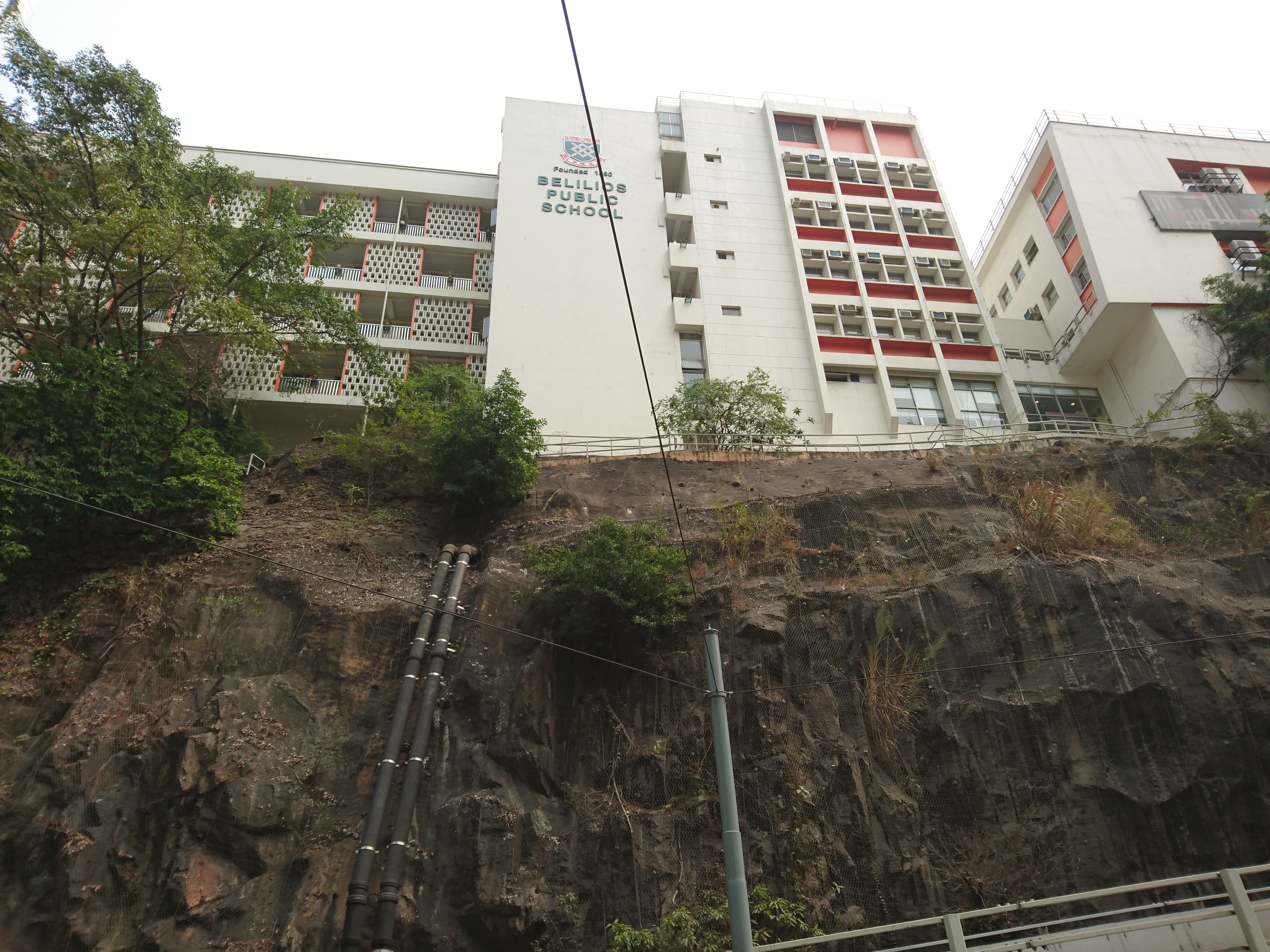
- 51 Tin Hau Temple Road, North Point, Hong Kong

Information
- Type: Public
- Motto: Climb High See Wide
- Established: 1890
- Principal: Ms Wong Fei
- Enrollment: 850 students
- Colours: Green and orange
- Medium of instruction: English
- Website: http://www.belilios.edu.hk/

Belilios Public School
- Traditional Chinese: 庇理羅士女子中學
- Simplified Chinese: 庇理罗士女子中学
- Literal meaning: Belilios Girls' Secondary School
Transcriptions
Standard Mandarin
- Hanyu Pinyin: Bìlǐluóshì Nǚzǐ Zhōngxué
Yue: Cantonese
- Jyutping: bei3 lei5 lo4 si6 neoi5 zi2 zung1 hok6

Belilios Public School (Chinese: 庇理羅士女子中學, abbreviated as BPS) is the first government school for girls in Hong Kong, founded in 1890. It was also the first bilingual school in Hong Kong. It is in Tin Hau.

== History ==
In 1890, the Hong Kong Government set up the Central School for Girls at Old Bailey Street as the counterpart to the Central School (Queen's College, Hong Kong). Mr. Emanual R. Belilios, a Jewish philanthropist, donated HK$25,000 for a new building for the Central School for Girls in 1893, at the old site of Central School where a three-storeyed building was erected between Hollywood Road and Gough Street.

The school was renamed Belilios Public School in honour of Mr. Belilios. In 1946 after the Second World War, BPS moved to Hospital Road. In April 1965, the school moved again, to its present premises in Tin Hau Temple Road. To mark the occasion, a new school motto (Climb High, See Wide), a school song and a new school badge were created.

== Class structure ==
There are 24 classes; this includes 4 classes (B, P, S, H) each for F.1- F.6.

=== School houses ===
House Name	Color
Yan House	Blue
Yee House	Yellow
Lai House	Green
Chee House	Red

== Achievements ==
BPS is one of the most prestigious secondary schools in Hong Kong. While its students generally achieve superb academic results, the school promotes also all-rounded development in different fields of arts, music and sports. Entrance hurdles are high and the school is reputed to have one of the toughest admission criteria in Hong Kong.

== Results of public examinations ==
Belilios Public School is one of the 40 schools that have ever produced top scorers in The Hong Kong Diploma of Secondary Education Examination (HKDSE).

7 x 5** "Top Scorers" are described by media and HKEAA as candidates who obtained perfect scores of 5** in each of the four core subjects and three electives.

8 x 5** "Super Top Scorers" are described by media and HKEAA as candidates who obtained seven Level 5** in each of the four core subjects and three electives, and an additional Level 5** in the Mathematics Extended (M1/M2) module.

- 2017: Sze Yik Yan: 7 x 5** "Top Scorers" : awarded the “Charles Frankland Moore Award” presented by the Hong Kong Sino-British Fellowship Trust Scholars' Association for attaining the highest aggregated marks in HKDSE Examination 2017 and was admitted to HKU MBBS program.

== Notable alumni ==
- Lee Sun Chau (周理信, 1890–1979) – One of the first female Chinese doctors of Western medicine in China.
- Denise Yue – Former Secretary for the Civil Service and former Permanent Secretary for Commerce, Industry and Technology (Commerce and Industry)
- Nellie Fong (方黃吉雯) – Former member of the Executive Council of Hong Kong and Legislative Council of Hong Kong
- Subrina Chow Shun-yee（周舜宜） – Former Assistant Director of Administration in the Office of the Chief Secretary for Administration. Former Director of Hong Kong Society for the Protection of Children.
- Canny Leung (梁芷珊) – Entrepreneur, author, lyricist and screenwriter
- Money Lo (盧敏儀) – Practising barrister and former actress
- Charmaine Li (李思欣) - Actress
- Gladys Liu (廖嬋娥) - Former member of the Australian House of Representatives
- Lau Wai Ming (劉惠鳴) - Cantonese opera artist, Arts Advisor and Artistic Director
- Lily Leung (梁舜燕) - Late Hong Kong television actress
- Little Thunder (門小雷) - Cartoonist
- Yoyo Kwok (郭曉妍) – member of Cantopop girl group Lolly Talk

== See also ==
- Education in Hong Kong
- List of schools in Hong Kong
