= Ng May Ying =

Cantonese opera performer

Ng May Ying (Chinese: 吳美英; born Pun Kwai Mui Chinese: 潘桂妹) also known as Ng Mei Ying, is a Cantonese opera performer. She comes from a family of Cantonese opera performers. Ng Shang Ying 吳尚英, her adoptive father, was a ‘man mou sang’ (actor who can play both civil and martial roles). Her uncle, Ng Hon Ying 吳漢英, was a ‘mou sang’ (specializes in martial roles).

Since November 1994, Ng May Ying has been the leading ‘hua dan’ 正印花旦 (actress) of Ming Chee Sing Opera Troupe 鳴芝聲劇團. The Troupe's leading ‘man mou sang’ is Joyce Koi Ming Fai 蓋鳴暉, a Cantonese opera male impersonator.

Ng May Ying was one of the four former co-stars at Lam Kar Sing birthday celebration in 2015.

She has performed overseas in countries like U.S.A., Canada, England, Australia, Japan, China, Singapore, Macau, amongst others. Her stage appearance and operatic movements earned her the nickname of ‘ancient beauty’ [古典美人].

She has also acted at the 34th Hong Kong Arts Festival 2006, New York Celebrates Hong Kong Festival 2008, and 24th Macao International Music Festival 2010.

== Stage career ==
During her early years, Ng May Ying learned traditional Chinese dancing under Heoi Kwun Hon 許君漢, and performed with him at nightclubs. Later, her father taught her the Southern style Cantonese Opera 南派粵劇. Her singing teacher was Liu Sum 廖森 and Northern style operatic martial arts 北派功架 instructor was Heoi Kwun Hon.

Her career in Cantonese opera acting began in the late 1960s. At a young age, she made her debut on board Macau's casino ship. After being the supporting ‘hua dan’ for 3 months, she was promoted to be the leading ‘hua dan’.

After her return to Hong Kong, she performed at Kai De Amusement Park Cantonese Opera Theatre, jointly with ‘man mou sang’ such as Yuen Siew Fai 阮兆輝, Leung Hon Wai 梁漢威, etc.

In 1974, she joined the Diamond Troupe 鑽⽯劇團 for a North America tour led by Chan Ho Kau 陳好逑 with Lam Kam-tong 林錦堂 and Leung Hon Wai 梁漢威 as part of a crew of mostly young up-and-coming Hong Kong performers. The seven days scheduled was extended to 11 days in Toronto, Canada. The Golden Harvest Theater event at 285 Spadina Avenue was profitable and encouraging to the organizer in Toronto.

In 1975 she formed her own opera troupe and partnered renowned ‘man mou sang’ Man Chin Sui 文千歲. Ng May Ying, Man Chin Sui and Liong Sing Bor 梁醒波 were the original performers of “White Dragon Fortress”《白龍關》, a well-known opera, popular with both professional and amateur Cantonese opera performers.

In April 1978, she was the leading lady for Cantonese Opera maestro Lam Kar Sing 林家聲 in his performance of Operas for the Deities [神功戲] at Cha Kwo Ling. Such opera performances are held in temporary-built stage in rural areas, and devoted to the celebration of folk festivals, birthdays of deities, etc. She had another 8 rounds of stage performances with Lam Kar Sing in later years.

In the 1970s & 80s, she and Leung Hon Wai often performed together, at Kai De Amusement Park, with Hon Ying Cantonese Opera Troupe, and in Singapore.

From 1 to 22 January 1981, Lam Kar Sing, with her as the leading ‘hua dan’, staged 25 opera shows in Singapore.

In September 1993, as the leading ‘hua dan’ of Zung Sun Sing Troupe, she acted with Lam Kar Sing in his round of farewell performances in the United States and Canada.

Between 1980 and 1993, Ng May Ying was usually the leading ‘hua dan’ in Lam Kar Sing's overseas performances. At his 82nd birthday dinner in January 2015, Lam Kar Sing commented to those present that Ng May Ying was his leading ‘hua dan’ for overseas engagements「出埠花旦」.

Ng May Ying's acting career has lasted over 5 decades. In this time, she has worked with most of the well-known ‘man mou sang’ of Hongkong. As of September 2017, Joyce Koi Ming Fai and Ng May Ying have been stage partners for 23 years, a record in Cantonese Opera.

== Specialized in ‘dau ma dan’ role ==
There are two types of opera plays: ‘man’ 文戲 and ‘mou’ 武戲. ‘Man’ role is usually the gentler and more elegant character whereas ‘mou’ character often requires martial or gymnastic skills.

Ng May Ying was trained as a ‘dau ma dan’, that is, a ‘dan’ who specializes in playing ‘mou’ roles (for example, female warrior role). Her potential caught the attention of ‘Charitable Opera King’ Sun Ma Sze Tsang 伶王新馬師曾, a famous Cantonese opera actor.

On a rare occasion, Sun Ma played the female role ‘Mu Kwai Ying’ 穆桂英, a famous lady warrior of the Song dynasty. Ng May Ying was given the role of ‘Mu Gwa’ 穆瓜, the maid. This is to let her observe on stage his walking movement 台步 when wearing the opera military costume 大靠, with a bunch of flags at the back 背旗. The flags should not be swinging to and fro when the actor moves about. Such walking movement is difficult to master. Ng May Ying was given the chance to learn how to walk gracefully despite the complex and heavy costume.

In Chinese opera, a ‘hua dan’ sometimes will imitate the ancient practice of foot binding 紮腳 (also known as "lotus feet" 三寸金蓮). She will wear a pair of ‘lotus shoe’ for bound feet while performing her role on stage. Such skills can only be acquired through tough training and tolerance of pain.

Ng May Ying is known for her role as the lady warrior in the traditional opera “Bound feet Lau Kam Ding Battling at the Fort”《紮腳劉金定斬四門》.

In September 2001, Ming Chee Sing Opera Troupe co-operated with Chun Fai Troupe 春暉劇團. Ng May Ying acted in 5 plays with Yuen Siew Fai, namely “The Red Shoe and Headless Body” 《紅菱巧破無頭案》， “Madam White Snake” 《白蛇傳》, “Bound Feet Lau Kam Ding Battling at the Fort” 《紮腳劉金定斬四門》, “White Dragon Fortress” 《白龍關》& “The Hero & Madame Wild Rose” 《英雄掌上野荼薇》.

Opera Magazine “Xi Que Pin Wei No.12” (戲曲品味第12期) gave a very good review of her performances in the above operas.

== First attempt in male role ==
In November 2002, Ming Chee Sing Opera Troupe celebrated its 12th anniversary with 7 nights’ Cantonese opera performances at Sunbeam Theatre 新光戲院. One of the highlights of those performances was that in the well-known opera 「The Princess in Distress」《鳳閣恩仇末了情》, ‘man mou sang’ Joyce Koi Ming Fai played the role of Princess while ‘hua dan’ Ng May Ying acted as the General. This is the first time Ng May Ying is cast in a male role.

== Switch from ‘mou’ to ‘man’ roles ==
The operas put up by Ming Chee Sing Opera Troupe are mainly the ‘man’ kind 文戲. As Ng May Ying specializes in ‘mou’ plays 武戲, she has to spend a lot of time and effort to familiarize herself with those 'man' operas when she first joined the troupe.

During the past 23 years, the operas that she performed are mostly those famous plays of Yam Kim Fai 任劍輝 /Bak Sheut Sin 白雪仙 & Lam Kar Sing, and the newly written operas by Master Edward Li 李居明.

== Accident during CNY 2015 ==
On 23 February 2015 (5th day of lunar year), Ng May Ying fractured her right ankle in the midst of performing “Liao chai jing meng”《聊齋驚夢》. She had an operation with an implant of seven screws. A year was needed for full, complete recovery.

== Discography ==
Ng May Ying has released a few albums with Comedy King Tang Kee Chan (諧劇大王鄧寄塵) and The Temple Street Prince Jackson Wan Kwong (廟街歌王尹光) before. She has also partnered Lam Kar Sing，Leung Hon Wai, Man Chin Sui and Liong Sing Bor in some of her earlier records.

Together with Joyce Koi Ming Fai, she has recorded a record-breaking number of Cantonese opera song CDs and Cantonese opera karaoke VCDs/DVDs.

Also, there are other Cantonese opera karaoke VCDs/DVDs featuring her with China's well-known ‘man mou sang’ such as Law Kar Bao 羅家寶, Pang Chi Kun 彭熾權, Leung Yew Onn 梁耀安, etc.

Above songs and videos are available at YouTube/Tudou.

Ng May Ying was a committee member of the Cantonese Opera Development Fund Advisory Committee from August 2013 to July 2017.

She ever served on the Administrative Committee of The Chinese Artists Association of Hong Kong for three terms (from 1984 to 1986, 1990 to 1992, and 1992 to 1994).
