= Loong Kim Sang =

- 龍劍笙
- Born: Lee Pui Sang (李菩生); 4 November 1944 (age 81); Hong Kong
- Occupations: Actress; performer; (文武生)
- Years active: 1972–1992, 2004 onwards
- Musical career
- Genres: Cantonese opera; Chor Fung Ming Cantonese Opera Troupe; (雛鳳鳴)
- Instrument: Voice

Chinese name
- Traditional Chinese: 龍劍笙
- Simplified Chinese: 龙剑笙
Transcriptions
Standard Mandarin
- Hanyu Pinyin: Lóng Jiànshēng
Yue: Cantonese
- Jyutping: Lung^{4} Gim^{3} Saang^{1}

Loong Kim Sang (born 4 November 1944) is a Cantonese opera performer. She is widely regarded as a pioneer in playing "Wenwusheng" lead male roles, combining literary opera and martial arts scenes.

== Childhood and training ==
Loong was born Lee Pui Sang on 4 November 1944 (Lunar 19 September 1944), the fourth child of a teacher father and a homemaker mother, who had one son and seven daughters. In 1960, against the wishes of her father and brother but with the financial support of her mother and sisters, she applied to train as a dancer with the Sin Fung Ming troupe created by her mentor Yam Kim-fai and Bak Sheut Sin. She and 21 other finalists were selected for training from 1,000 candidates.

In 1963, the Chor Fung Ming Opera Troupe was founded and Loong was one of 12 of the finalists invited back to learn Huadan and Xiaosheng roles. From 1968 to 1970, she shared the stage with Yam Kim-fai and debuted in 1969 Farewell, My Husband. Loong was recognized as promising during the late 1960s and 1970s, and acted in various types of Cantonese opera as male leads in full versions with several female leads as co-stars.

Loong worked and studied under Yam's tutelage for several years. In 1972, when Yam was invited to perform in Vietnam, Loong went in her place. In 1973, she made her home debut in Hong Kong with the Chor Fung Ming (Young Phoenix) Cantonese Opera Troupe (雛鳳鳴).

== Early career ==
Loong performed nine times for a week in 1973 and in a total of 11 weeks in 1973/74. Investors and theatre managers would hire the troupe and, if they proved to be profitable, extend their season. Troupes were expected to perform a large repertoire at very short notice. From 1973 to the early 1990s, Loong performed in over 50 well-known plays, usually one or two titles a day. These might be requested only the day before by theatre owners, and on overseas tours patrons might send requests written on a beverage napkin.

Having learnt the essential basics like ending rhyme 韻腳 in the decade of training from 1960 to 1970, Loong could honor new requests without even a day's notice in the evening by studying the manuscript overnight and rehearsing in the afternoon. This was the only way to survive extension after extension since repeating of titles was not acceptable to audiences, except for a small number of popular ones during first overseas tour in Vietnam. Thus in 1975 a planned 21-day Singapore trip was extended to 66 days (77 shows).

=== Historical overseas tours ===
- 1972, Her first overseas tour was in Vietnam, doing more than over 40 shows in 37 days, at a theatre in Cholon, Ho Chi Minh City.
- 1975, SE Asia, 106 shows in 91 days, at Ketra Ayers People's Theatre in Singapore and elsewhere. Deputy Prime Minister Goh Keng Swee invited the troupe to attend the celebration of the tenth Singapore National Day.
- 1976, SE Asia, 117 shows in 102 days: Loong's troupe returned to Singapore in 1976 because there were requests for more performances after 77 sold-out performances the year before.
- 1978, United States and Canada, 89 shows in 71 days.
- 1982, Loong was invited to perform for the Christmas season by the Caesars Palace casino in Las Vegas. This followed the in stage success of The Story of Emperor Li. This was a theatrical adaptation of a failed 1968 film, Tragedy of the Poet King. Loong hired Yip Shiu-Tak (葉紹德) to adapt it for the stage.
- 1984 North America tour, the Mayor of New York, Ed Koch, honored the troupe she led just as Mei Lanfang had been honored in the 1930s after the performance at the Sun Sing Theatre.

=== Film ===
Loong made only four films, including three remakes of works by Yam.

Year	Movie Title	Title In Chinese	Character In Movie	In Chinese	Director	Director In Chinese
1968	Tragedy of the Poet King	李後主	King's Brother Li Congshan	皇弟李從善	Lee Sun-Fung	李晨風
1975	Laugh in the Sleeve	三笑姻緣	Tong Pak-Fu	唐伯虎	Lee Tit	李鐵
1976	Princess Chang Ping	帝女花	Zhou Shixian	周世顯	John Woo	吳宇森
1977	The Legend of the Purple Hairpin	紫釵記	Li Yi	李益	Lee Tit	李鐵

== Sabbatical and return, 1992–2014 ==
On 10 March 1992 Loong announced her retirement and moved to Canada. A number of factors played a role in her decision. In 2012 and 2014, Loong disclosed that before her retirement she had been in poor health, particularly since the death of her mentor Yam in 1989. In her later years Yam had advised Loong to consider retiring because of the lack of good new scripts. She did not want Loong to simply continue performing legacy works to make a living. By the time she retired Loong was exhausted from close to 150 performances per year.

Many of the people she had worked closely with in her earlier career were no longer with her by 1992. Two Chu brothers were musicians who had composed scores for Yam as well as for Loong herself, died in 1981 and 1985. Two associates from her dance class of 1960 moved on in 1988 when her godfather Luo Pinchao also left China for the United States. Other veterans of the group, including Lang Chi Bak, also left or retired.

In November 2004, in commemoration of 15th anniversary of her death, her mentor Yam Kim Fai, Loong returned to the stage. Her work from 2005 onwards received great critical acclaim and Loong remains the Cantonese Opera performer with the best box-office record.

From September 2005 to September 2008 Loong gave 80 charity performances to full houses (mostly full versions of two titles) in Hong Kong and Macau. Despite having undergone keyhole surgery just two months before performances started Loong took on a very demanding role as male lead in Di Nü Hua.

In 2009, for the 60th anniversary of the People's Republic of China, a series of celebrations were held in Hong Kong. Loong was invited as one of two special guests to perform in the Hong Kong Coliseum "on 31 October" in a Cantonese opera gala to celebrate National Day.

In August 2010, when a new manuscript was sent to her in Canada, Loong replied within couple of days that she had no plans to return to the stage.

== Since 2014 ==
In 2014, Loong shared stage for the first time with some new "love interests" to commemorate the quarter of a century since the death of her mentor Yam. The title of this event in Chinese was "Ren Yi Sheng Hui Nian Long Qing" (任藝笙輝念濃情), a series of 25 shows as a tribute to her mentor Yam's iconic roles on stage.

The press praised the effort in 2014 and called for continuation of opportunities in the future for other up-and-coming performers. Loong responded with 16 shows in 2015/2016 at the Lyric Theatre, HKAPA, where all the performers except her were up-and-coming performers in main roles. The headline production in this series was “The Purple Hairpin”(龍劍笙:紫釵記全劇).

The Peony Pavilion (Chinese: 龍劍笙 - 牡丹亭驚夢全劇) was staged in 2017/8 to complete the 2014 events in remembrance of mentor Yam. In 2019 Loong staged 13 performances of “Di Nü Hua” (28 November – 14 December) to commemorate 30 years (1989–2019) since the deathof mentor Yam Kim Fai.

== Accolades ==
- 1982 Gold Disc Award
- 1990 Artists of the Year Awards in acting: Best Actor Award by the Hong Kong Artists Alliance.
- 2011 IFPI awards: (credited as Lung Kim Sheng), Award for Excellent Contribution to Cantonese Opera IFPI (香港粵劇貢獻大獎).
- 2012 IFPI awards: (credited as Lung Kim Sheng), DVD "Ren Qu Sheng Yun" (任曲笙韻) and "Long Qing Shi Yi Ban Shi Ji" (龍情詩意半世紀).
- 2015 IFPI awards: (credited as Lung Kim Sheng), received recognition for her effort to remember her mentor Yam Kim Fai and to bring up-and-coming performers onto stage in 2014.
- 2016 IFPI awards: (credited as Lung Kim Sheng), DVD "Zi Chai Ji (Quan Ju)" 紫釵記(全劇)
