= Mak Bing-wing =

Actor (b. 1915, d. 1984)

Mak Bing-wing (Chinese: 麥炳榮; 1915–1984) was a Chinese actor active in Cantonese opera.

Born in 1915 in Guangdong, he attended Wah Yan College, Hong Kong and began his acting career in the 1930s. He left Hong Kong in 1941 for a tour of the United States, returning in 1947. after the Pacific War had ended. While in the United States, Mak appeared in many Grandview Film Company productions. His third marriage, to Yu So-chow in 1966, produced three children. Mak was also close to actress Wong-Nui Fung, whom he met while both were active in the Great Dragon Phoenix Theatre Troupe. The two later played lead characters in the Film A Ten-Year Dream. Mak died in the United States in 1984, where he and Yu had retired.

== Repertoire ==
- A Mismatched Couple
- The Perfect Match
- When Swallows Return
- The Heroes and the Beauty
- A Triumphant Return
- Romance by the Peach Blossom Lake
- The Revenge
- Return From Battle for His Love
- Ten Years Dream (a.k.a. Ten-Year Dream of Yangzhou)
- The Princess in Distress (a.k.a. Romance of the Phoenix Chamber)
- A Maid Commander-in-Chief and a Rash General
- A Lady Prime Minister of Two Countries
- The Villain, The General and the Heroic Beauty
- Two Heroic Families
- Power and Dilemma
- No Return Without Victory
- An Agnostic and Sagacious Intercession
- The God's Story

== Filmography ==
=== Films ===
This is a partial list of films. (See § External links, Hkmdb & Imdb page for Mak.)

- 1950 A Chivalrous Bandit
- 1955 Love in a Dangerous City (opposite actor Chan Fai-lung, the Dan)
- 1957 The Nymph of the River Lo++
- 1958 A Buddhist Recluse for 14 Years++
- 1958 Lady Wen's Return to the Han People-+
- 1958 Flower of the Night-+
- 1959 The Brave Daughters of Han-+

-+Opposite Yim Fun Fong
++Opposite Fong and Yam Kim-fai

- A Ten-Year Dream
- A Lady Prime Minister of Two Countries
- Return from Battle for His Love
- Romance of the Phoenix Chamber
- The Unruly Commander-in-chief and the Blunt General (a.k.a. A Maid Commander-in-Chief and a Rash General)
- No Return Without Victory
- An Agnostic and Sagacious Intercession
- Knight of the Victory Marked Flag
