= Siu-Lei Chun =

Chinese actress (1925–2005)

- Chinese: 秦小梨
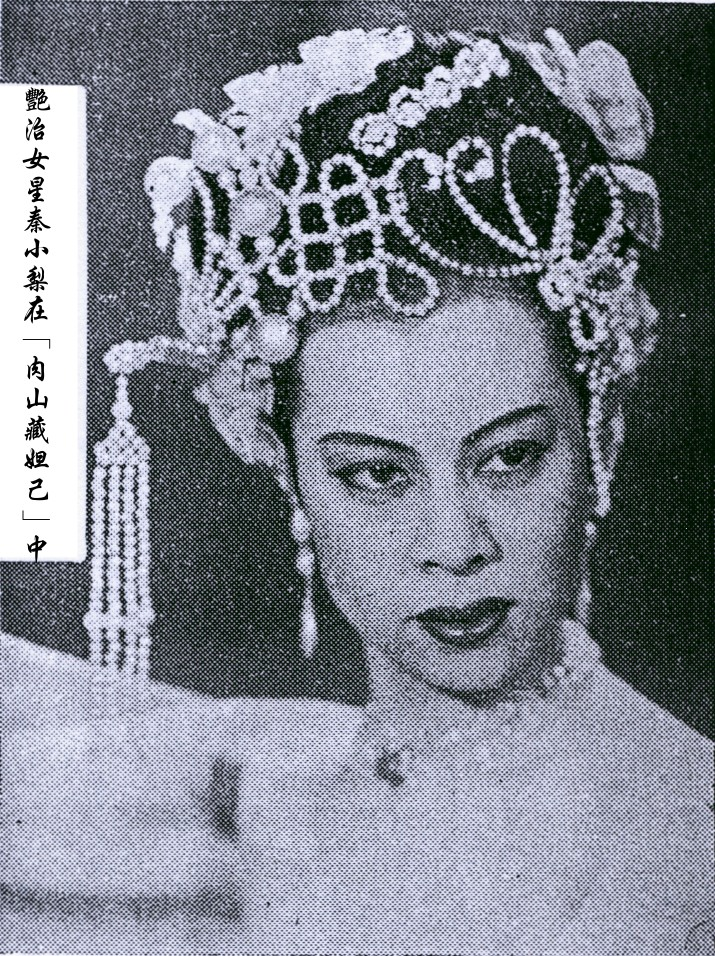
- Chun in 1948
- Born: May 13, 1925
- Died: October 12, 2005 (aged 80)
- Other names: Chun Siu-Lei, Chun Siu-Lay, Chin Xiao-Li, Qin Xiaoli
- Citizenship: United States
- Occupations: Cantonese opera singer; actress
- Years active: 1949–1960

Siu-Lei Chun (Chinese: 秦小梨) (1925–2005) is a former Chinese actress and Cantonese opera singer from Hong Kong. Chun is credited with over 75 films.

== Early life ==
On May 13, 1925, Chun was born. Chun's sister is Chun Siu-Kiu.

== Career ==
In 1949, Chun's acting career began in Hong Kong. Chun appeared in lead roles in Cantonese opera films directed by But Fu. Chun appeared as Tan Kei in Tan Kei in the Meat Hill, a 1949 Cantonese opera film, as Lei-Fa in Sex to Kill the Devil, a 1949 Cantonese opera film, as Muk Kwai-Ying in The Woman General Mu Guiyung, a 1949 Cantonese opera film, and in Romance of Rome Palace, a 1949 Cantonese opera film. Chun also appeared in Martial Arts, comedy, drama and horror films. Chun's last film was Iron Arms and the Boxer, a 1960 Martial Arts film directed by Wu Pang. Chun is known as the first generation of sexy actress in Hong Kong. Chun is credited with over 75 films.

Chun's Aqua Blue Gemstone Hair Accessories are on display at Hong Kong Heritage Museum's in the Cantonese Opera Heritage Hall.

== Filmography ==
=== Films ===
This is a partial list of films.

- 1949 Tan Kei in the Meat Hill
- 1949 Adventure at the Women's House – Pak Yuk-Seung, Cantonese opera
- 1949 Sex to Kill the Devil
- 1949 The Woman General Mu Guiyung
- 1949 Romance of Rome Palace
- 1950 The Great Dictator
- 1950 The Battle Between Demon Girl and the Ox Devil – Demon girl
- 1950 Six Attempt to Immortalise the Goddess of Lotus
- 1950 Magic of Tiger Dragon – Tan Kei
- 1950 The Battle Between the Handsome Master and the Wild Girl – Wild Girl
- 1951 The Sword and the Pearl – Mu-Lan/Mok Lan
- 1951 Debt of Love
- 1951 Sweet Girls
- 1960 Iron Arms and the Boxer

== Personal life ==
In 1961, Chun immigrated to San Francisco, California. Chun became a United States citizen through marriage. On October 12, 2005, Chun died.
