= Wong-Nui Fung =

Chinese actress and Cantonese opera singer

- Chinese: 鳳凰女
- Born: Guo Ruizhen; 1925; Guangdong Province, China
- Died: 1992 (aged 66–67); Hong Kong
- Other names: Fung Wong Nui, Fung Wong-Nui, Nu Fenghuang
- Occupations: Cantonese opera singer; actress
- Years active: 1940–1984

Wong-Nui Fung or Fung Wong Nui (Chinese: 鳳凰女) (1925–1992) was a former Chinese actress and Cantonese opera singer from Hong Kong. Fung is credited with over 250 films. Fung Huang Nui is a stage name and means Fenghuang Lady.

== Early life ==
In 1925, Fung was born as Guo Ruizhen in Guangdong province, China. Fung attended Jiefang Girls Middle School in Guangzhou, China.

== Career ==
At age 13, Fung started her career performing Cantonese opera. Fung studied under Zilan Nu. In 1950, Fung crossed over as an actress in Hong Kong films. Fung appeared in Monk in Love, a 1950 drama film directed by Wong Toi. Fung appeared in How Seven Heroes Crossed the Golden Bank (Part 1), a 1951 Historical drama Cantonese opera film directed by Yeung Kung-Leung. Fung appeared in The Twelve Beauties with both Yam Kim-fai and Pak Suet Sin, a 1952 Cantonese opera film directed by Chan Pei. By 1963, Fung is known for her rank as a second huadan in Cantonese opera. Fung's last film was The Imperial Warrant, 1968 Cantonese opera film directed by Yang Fan. Fung is credited with over 250 films.

== Repertoire ==
This is a partial list.

- A Ten-Year Dream
- A Lady Prime Minister of Two Countries
- Return from Battle for His Love (a.k.a. The Marshal's Marriage)
- Romance of the Phoenix Chamber (a.k.a. The Princess in Distress)
- The Unruly Commander-in-chief and the Blunt General

(all have film version)

== Theater performance ==
This is a partial list.

- 1974, 2nd Hong Kong Arts Festival (self-financing 3 titles)

1. Xue Pinggui
2. Time To Go Home
3. Substituting a Racoon for the Prince

- 1979, 7th Hong Kong Arts Festival
- 1980, 8th Hong Kong Arts Festival

== Filmography ==
=== Films ===
This is a partial list of films.

- 1950 Monk in Love
- 1952 The Twelve Beauties
- 1953 A Bachelor's Love Affair - Swindler
- 1953 The Humiliated Rickshaw-Puller - wife
- 1960 The Princess and Fok Wah
- 1960 The Orphan Saved Her Adoptive Mother
- 1961 Three Battles to Secure Peace for Nation
- 1961 Dreams for the Past Events (a.k.a. Ten Years Dream)
- 1961 Feminine General 'Far Mok Lan' (a.k.a. Lady General Fa Muk-Lan)
- 1962 All Because of a Smile
- 1962 Kinship Is the Strongest Bond (a.k.a. An Agnostic and Sagacious Intercession)
- 1963 Lust Is the Worst Vice
- 1968 The Imperial Warrant

=== Television series ===
- Police Woman
- Ladies and Gentlemen, Miss Fung Wong Nui

== Personal life ==
On December 1, 1992, Fung died in Hong Kong.
