= The Peony Pavilion: The Astonishing Dream =

Cantonese opera

The Peony Pavilion: The Astonishing Dream (牡丹亭驚夢) is a Cantonese opera script by Hong Kong's renowned playwright Tong Tik‑sang. It is adapted from Ming‑dynasty dramatist Tang Xianzu’s classical Kunqu work The Peony Pavilion (also known as The Story of the Soul's Return). The original work consisted of 55 scenes, which Tang Disheng condensed into 6 acts (later theater companies usually split the original 6 acts into 8 acts). While retaining the core of the story, he inevitably made some compromises and omissions to the original structure.

This play formed part of the second repertoire of the Sin Fung Ming Opera Troupe (仙鳳鳴劇團), premiering on 19 November 1956 at the Lee Theatre, with Yam Kim-fai, Pak Suet‑sin, and others in the leading roles. Together with The Golden Fan (穿金寶扇), it constituted the troupe's second‑season programme.

== Plot ==
The story tells of Do Lai-leung (杜麗娘), the sixteen‑year‑old daughter of the Prefect of Nan’an of Song Dynasty. After a springtime stroll in the garden, she is moved by the season's beauty and falls asleep beside the Peony Pavilion, where she dreams of a young scholar, Lau Mung-mui (柳夢梅). The two fall instantly in love and pledge themselves to one another by the lakeside rocks. Upon waking, Do becomes consumed by longing for the lover she met only in her dream. Her melancholy deepens into illness, and before dying she paints her own portrait and instructs that it be hidden beneath a Taihu rock.

Three years later, the scholar Lau Mung-mui travels to the capital for the imperial examinations. Passing by Meihua Nunnery (梅花庵), he discovers Do's portrait. Her spirit, moved by his devotion, visits him at night. Once Lau learns the truth, he opens her grave at Do's pleading and helps her return to life. After becoming husband and wife, the couple face further trials, but in the end the emperor intervenes, allowing Do to reunite with her family and bringing the tale to a joyful close.

== Acts ==
=== Original version ===
Tang Di‑sheng's original mud‑print version of The Peony Pavilion: The Astonishing Dream is structured into six acts, each tracing a key moment in Do Lai-leung and Lau Mung-mui's dream‑bound romance and eventual reunion:

==== Act I: A Dream in the Garden (遊園驚夢) ====
Do Lai-leung enters the rear garden for the first time. Moved by the spring scenery, she falls asleep beside the Peony Pavilion and dreams of the scholar Lau Mung-mui. The two fall instantly in love.

==== Scene II: The Portrait (寫真) ====
Awakening from the dream, Do Lai-leung becomes lovesick. Before dying of melancholy, she paints her own likeness and instructs her maid Chun‑heung to hide the portrait beneath the Taihu rock.

==== Scene III: A Ghostly Encounter and Return to Life (幽媾 and 回生) ====
This is the core, extremely long scene.

Lau Mung-mui lodging at Plum Blossom Monastery and discovering Do Lai-leung's portrait.

A scene change or stage rotation, after which Do Lai-leung's spirit appears and meets Lau Mung-mui in a ghostly tryst.

Do Lai-leung reveals the truth of her death; before dawn, Lau Mung-mui digs up her grave and opens the coffin, enabling her resurrection.

Modern productions often divide this long act into three or four separate scenes.

==== Scene IV: Reunion with Her Mother (會母) ====
After her revival, Do Lai-leung marries Lau Mung-mui . Together they travel to Hangzhou to find her mother, from whom she was separated during wartime.

==== Scene V: Interrogation at the Court (拷元) ====
Lau Mung-mui seeks news of Do Lai-leung's father, Du Bao, but Do Bo mistakes him for a grave‑robber and a charlatan. Lau Mung-mui is tortured and nearly executed.

==== Scene VI: Imperial Resolution (圓駕) ====
Lau Mung-mui places first in the imperial examinations. The case reaches the throne, and the emperor personally adjudicates. Du Bao finally accepts the truth of Do Lai-leung's resurrection, and the family is joyfully reunited.

=== Eight-Act Version ===
The third act consists of three scenes. The Lee Theatre has a rotating stage, so the three scenes can be completed in one performance. However, other theaters generally do not have rotating stages, and the third act is too long, so other companies often divide the lengthy third act into three separate acts, thus turning the original six-act opera into an eight-act opera:

- Act I: A Dream in the Garden (遊園驚夢)
- Act II: The Portrait (寫真)
- Act III: The Wandering Soul and the Discovery of the Portrait (魂遊、拾畫)
- Act IV: A Ghostly Encounter (幽媾)
- Act V: Return to Life (回生)
- Act VI: Reunion with Her Mother (會母)
- Act VII: Interrogation at the Court (拷元)
- Act VIII: Imperial Resolution (圓駕)

== Actor ==
The Cantonese opera The Peony Pavilion: The Astonishing Dream premiered in 1956 at the Lee Theatre in Hong Kong, led by the Sin Fung Ming Theatre Troupe, headed by Yam Kim-fai and Pak Suet-sin:

Actor	Role
Yam Kim-fai	Lau Mung-mui (male lead)
Pak Suet-sin	Do Lai-leung (female lead)
Leung Sing Poh	Chan Jui Leung (a rigid private tutor)
Lan Chi Pat	Do Bo (father of Do Lai-leung)
Yam Bing-yee	Spring Fragrance (a playful, clever, and rebellious personal maid of Do Lai-leung)
So Siu Tong	Mui Chun Lam
Lili Ying	Sui Yeung Liu
Pak Lung Chu	Madam Do
Chue Siu-por	Do On (a male servant to the male lead)
Au Wai-chuen	The Song Emperor
Mak Chau-nung	Summer Fragrance (personal maid of Madam Do)
Chan Tit-sin	Abbess Shek (an elderly Taoist nun)

== Recordings ==
The Peony Pavilion: The Astonishing Dream premiered on the evening of November 19, 1956, at the Lee Theatre. RTHK broadcast the entire play live on the evening of the 20th.

In 1958, Entertainment Records recorded a long Cantonese opera performance, sung by Chung Wan-shan, Chan Fung-sin, Pak Lung-chu, Mui Yan, Lo Siu-ping, Lee Po-lun, Fung Yuk-ling, and Kan Yiu-kai.

The Sin Fung Ming Cantonese Opera Troupe has not released a complete video or audio recording of The Peony Pavilion. The most complete record is the RTHK recordings of The Peony Pavilion: A Dream in the Garden (遊園驚夢) and The Peony Pavilion: A Ghostly Encounter (幽媾), the latter recorded during typhoon relief efforts (Typhoon Wanda) in 1962.

== Stage play version ==
In 2018, Lung Kim‑sang (performing as Lau Mung-mui), led the new generation of Cantonese‑opera "Six Pillars" in a revival of the classic. In this production, two of the Six Pillars alternated between the roles of Do Lai-leung and her maid Spring Fragrance (Chun‑heung), showcasing the troupe's emerging talent.

== Famous lines ==
- Twelve years confined within the eastern chambers, Growing up in the shadow of flowers, learning the art of embroidery. Curtains obscure my longing gaze; I have never seen a young man's face. In loneliness, I lean against the incense-burner, As my handkerchief catches dreams of a destined marriage. Yet a pure, ice-like heart is forever bound by purple silk. What beauty I possess is but a fragile thing; Lest it wash away entirely with the fleeting years, I commit it here to these broken pages and scattered volumes. 「十二載守樓東，長在花蔭課女紅。簾阻秋波，未睹兒郎面，寂寞倚熏攏，帕惹雀屏夢，冰心長有紫羅纏。豔質有幾分，不令與逝水年華，也付與斷篇零卷。」from A Dream in the Garden.
- I lodge, I lodge beneath the willow's shade; in the bitter wind and frost I beg only for a single tile of shelter. (我寄寓寄寓在柳陰下，悲風霜乞片瓦) from A Dream in the Garden.
- It is not that I intentionally, intentionally pry into your past, But at midnight, this modest study lacks tea to serve a guest. Pray, use no excuses of 'medicinal tea' like the maid in The West Chamber; Let me instead lend you an autumn lantern—and please, return home safely. (非關有意有意苦追查。夜半芳齋欠奉茶，莫借西廂送藥茶，我借盞秋燈你小心歸去吧！) from A Ghostly Encounter
- The old scholar carries ancient jade in his bosom; as he marks the night's examination papers, cinnabar stains his palm (老儒生懷中藏古玉，批夜卷掌上有朱砂) from A Ghostly Encounter.
- No trace of rouge or powder remains in this fragrant garden—could it be that heavenly maidens have scattered flowers here in the night? (芳苑更無紅粉在，莫非天女無端夜散花) from A Ghostly Encounter.

=== 1962 RTHK version of A Ghostly Encounter ===
In this scene, Chan Jui Leung (played by Leung Sing‑bo) hears the voices of a man and a woman talking and barges into Lau Mung-mui's room. Lau (played by Yam Kim‑fai) waves his hand frantically to signal Do Lai-leung (played by Bak Sheut‑sin) to hide.

Leung Sing‑bo: "What are you doing with that hand?" Yam Kim‑fai: "Nothing — my hand just has a touch of chicken‑claw palsy!" Leung Sing‑bo: "Chicken‑claw palsy? I'd say you've got sparrow palsy instead!"

Note: Sparrow in Cantonese sounds like mahjong (a popular strategy game in Hong Kong). Leung Sing‑bo is teasing Yam Kim‑fai, who was famously devoted to mahjong and often reluctant to leave the table before going on stage.

== Ticket price ==
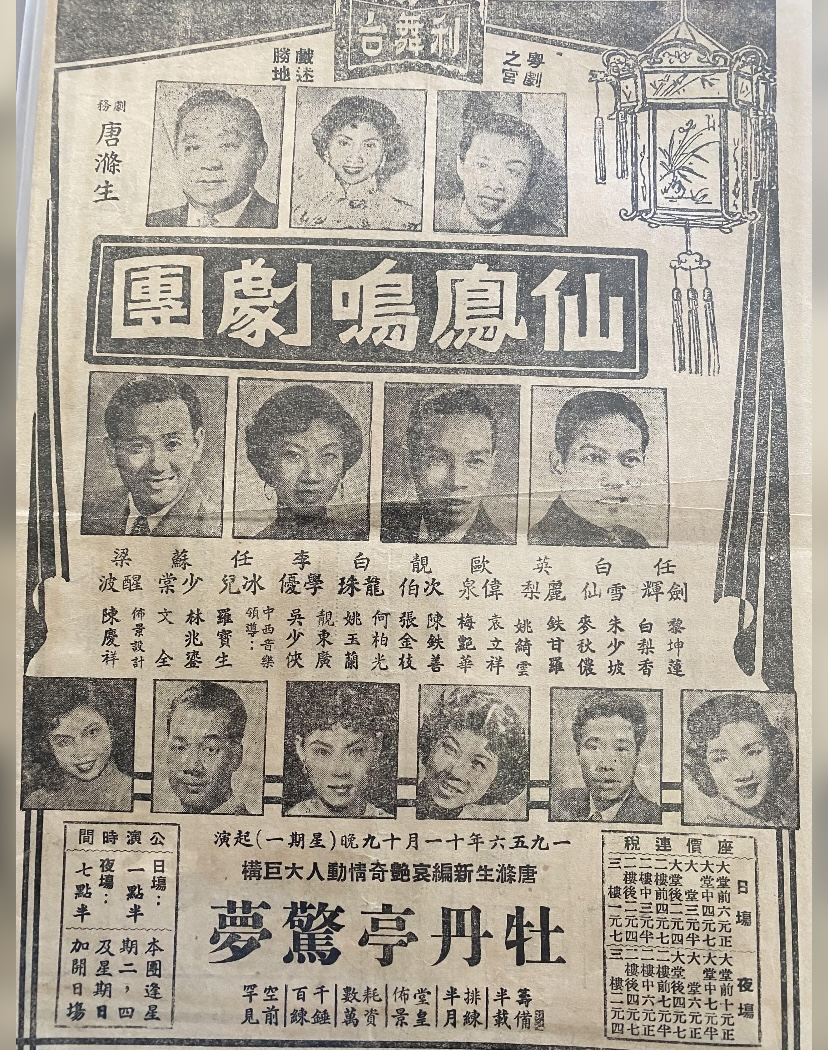
A promotional leaflet from Sin Fung Ming Cantonese Opera Troupe to outline performance dates and repertoires of The Peony Pavilion: The Astonishing Dream.

During the Sin Fung Ming era, tickets for The Peony Pavilion: The Astonishing Dream were often priced higher than those for other productions. According to accounts circulated among Cantonese‑opera enthusiasts, the reason was that the work was not warmly received when it was first staged. Only after the Sin Fung Ming troupe became famous did the production gain great popularity. It is said that Bak Sheut‑sin, displeased by the poor attendance at the early performances, later insisted on setting a higher ticket price for The Peony Pavilion: The Astonishing Dream.

On the night of its premiere on 19 November 1956, ticket prices ranged from HK$1.70 to HK$10, a level considered extremely expensive by the standards of the time.
