= Lau Wai Ming =

- Born: 9 October
- Occupations: Actress, Cantonese opera performer
- Musical career
- Also known as: Woo
- Origin: Hong Kong
- Genres: Cantonese opera
- Website: Lau Wai Ming Website

Lau Wai Ming (Chinese: 劉惠鳴) is an accomplished Cantonese opera artist from Hong Kong specializing in scholar-warrior roles (文武生). She graduated from Belilios Public School and completed her opera training at Yun Mun Cantonese Opera Academy 「韻文粵劇學苑」 and the Chinese Artists Association of Hong Kong Cantonese Opera Academy 「八和粵劇學院」. She is a veteran educator and arts advisor on Cantonese opera for children and youth, and she sits in several key Cantonese opera associations and committees,

== Awards ==
- Award for Arts Education, Certificate of Merit (Non-School Division)- Hong Kong Arts Development Year 2018 Award
- Rising Artist Award (Xiqu Category)- Hong Kong Arts Development Year 2003 Awards
- Champion (粵劇組) - Cantonese Opera Singing Competition organised by the Asia Television Ltd「亞洲電視主辦全港粵曲大賽」

== Current appointments ==
- Hong Kong Arts Development Council「香港藝術發展局」- Council Member
- Hong Kong Arts Development Council「香港藝術發展局」- Chairman (Xiqu Art Form) & Vice-Chairman (Arts Administration Art Form)
- Chinese Artists Association of Hong Kong 「香港八和會館」- Member (Executive Committee)
- Chinese Artists Association of Hong Kong (Actors Committee) 「香港粵劇演員會」- Chairman
- Chinese Artists Association of Hong Kong Cantonese Opera Academy 「八和粵劇學院 」- Committee Member
- Cantonese Opera Development Fund (CODF) 「香港粵劇發展基金 」- Assessor
- Yeung Ming Cantonese Opera Troupe「揚鳴粵劇團」- Artistic Director
- Yeung Ming Children Opera Troupe 「揚鳴兒童粵劇團」- Artistic Director
- Canadian Radio 「華橋之聲粵劇節目」- Guest Host

== Past appointments ==
- Hong Kong Arts Development Council「香港藝術發展局」- Council Member (2014-2016)
- Cantonese Opera Advisory Committee「粵劇發展諮詢委員會」 - Committee Member (2010-2017)
- Chinese Artists Association of Hong Kong (Actors Committee)「香港粵劇演員會」- Vice Chairman (2010-2013)
- Hong Kong Arts Development Council「香港藝術發展局」 - Xiqu Examiners (2010-2014)

== Continuous education in opera ==
In 2003, she started coaching children in Cantonese opera. She continues to be actively involved in teaching and nurturing children in kindergartens, primary and secondary schools to appreciate this traditional art form. Apart from her performance engagements and appointments in the above-mentioned organisations, she conducts opera seminars and workshops at educational institutions to create awareness and interest among the new generations, to share with them the importance of preserving this traditional performance art and cultural heritage. In recognition of her contribution towards arts education, Yeung Ming Cantonese Opera Troupe received the Year 2018, Certificate of Merit, Arts Education Award (Non-School Division) from the Hong Kong Arts Development Council .

== Community services ==
Besides her operatic career, Lau participated in fund raising activities for charities and as well as visits to old folks homes and hospitals. In 2004, she performed at the National Kidney Foundation 「腎臟基金會」fund raising event in Genting (Malaysia) and in Year 2012 and 2013, she was invited to perform in fund raising events in the United States and Canada. She was presented with Certificates of Recognition and Certificate of Appreciation by the various level of government offices in recognition of her contributions and support.

== Arts & cultural exchanges ==
In her early career, she already started to participate in cultural exchange programs. In Year 1993 and 1994, she served as a tourism ambassador for the Hong Kong Tourist Promotion Board 「香港旅遊發展局」, performed in Japan, introducing the traditional art form of Hong Kong cantonese opera and same time promote Hong Kong as a tourist destination. She continues to be actively involved in many arts and cultural exchange events and forums organized by overseas organizations, to discuss and exchange views and ideas revolving around the development of opera and its fraternities.

== Cantonese opera ==
Lau Wai Ming has performed in China, United Kingdom, the United States, Canada, Singapore, Malaysia, Macau and Japan. Over the years, she has performed in over 50 opera works and has worked with artists such as 南紅、任冰兒、尹飛燕、白雪紅、尤聲普、阮兆輝、陳詠儀、王超群、莊婉仙、李淑勤、陳嘉鳴、岑翠紅、鄭詠梅、花居冠、鄧美玲、高麗、文寶森、新劍郎、廖國森、溫玉瑜 among others. Some of the well-known opera titles performed include:

Opera Titles	劇名
The Peony Pavilion	牡丹亭驚夢
Princess Chang Ping	帝女花
The Purple Hairpin	紫釵記
Dream of the Red Chamber	紅樓夢
Legend of the White Snake	白蛇傳
Butterfly Lovers	樓台會
The Butterfly and Red Pear Blossoms	蝶影紅梨記
The Reincarnation of Lady Plum Blossom	再世紅梅記
The Last Emperor of Southern Tang	李後主
Mistake at the Flower Festival	花田八喜
Contention for Command	龍鳳爭掛帥
The Moon Pavilion	雙仙拜月亭
The Sounds of Battle	雷鳴金鼓戰笳聲

Her love for old Cantonese classic movies led her to produce and stage some of the movies into opera. So far, she has successfully staged the following titles and received good reviews.

Opera Titles	劇名
The Purple Hairpin	精品紫釵記
Twelve Railing Twelve Hairpin	十二欄杆十二釵
Fun of the 3 Generations	代代紐紋柴
Without Number	無號數 (非夢奇緣)
N.A	英雄情淚保山河
