= The Flower Princess =

Chinese short story

- Chinese: 帝女花
Transcriptions
Standard Mandarin
- Hanyu Pinyin: Dì Nǚ Huā
- Wade–Giles: Ti^{4}-nü^{3}-hua^{1}
Yue: Cantonese
- Yale Romanization: Dai-néuih-fā
- Jyutping: Dai^{3} Neoi^{5} Faa^{1}

The Flower Princess (Chinese: 帝女花; pinyin: Dì Nǚ Huā; lit. 'Princess Flower') is a fictional Chinese story about Princess Changping of the Ming Dynasty and her husband/lover, Zhou Shixian. The first known story was a Kunqu script written in the Qing Dynasty, while the second version was a Cantonese opera from the early 1900s later found in Japan and Shanghai. Little information is available from this early 1900s version. The contemporary prevailing version, not meant to be historically accurate, comes from the second Cantonese opera script.

The story unfolds as Princess Changping and Zhou Shixian are introduced to each other, participating in an arranged marriage. They meet and get engaged with the blessing of their parents. Her father, the emperor, is overthrown by Li Zicheng. To save herself, the Princess hides as a nun in a monastery, but she happens to meet Zhou again. After being found by the new regime (the Qing dynasty), she follows Zhou's plan to eventually commit suicide. Zhou formulates a plan to make sure that her father is properly buried (without asking for a proper burial ceremony) while her little brother is released to safety. Zhou returns alone to negotiate with the new regime using the bargaining power vested in him by a written request from her. Once the new regime makes good on these promises, the couple return to her former home for a wedding ceremony. They take poison (in some versions it is arsenic) on their wedding night in the palace garden where they first met.

== Adaptations ==
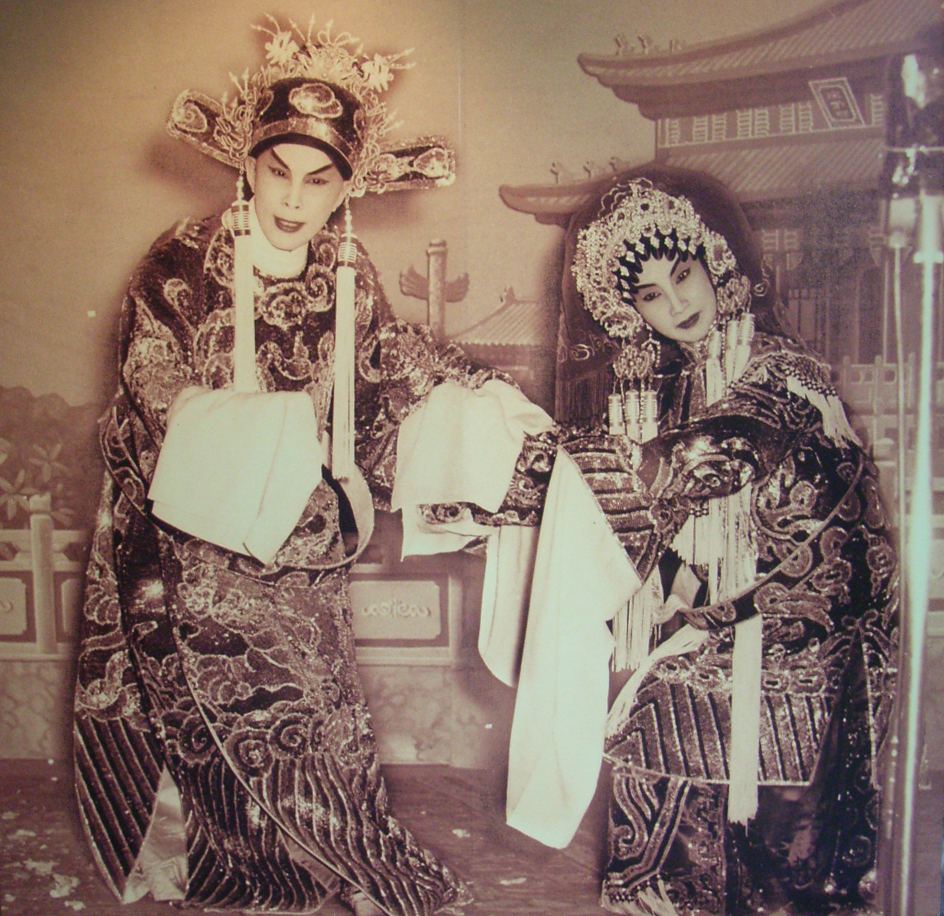
Yam Kim-fai (left) with Bak Sheut-sin pose in costume for a performance of The Flower Princess.

Using the Kunqu version and other publications, playwright Tang Ti-sheng adapted the story into a Cantonese opera. The opera made its debut at the Lee Theatre on 7 June 1957. Actresses Yam Kim-fai and Bak Sheut-sin were part of the original cast and portrayed the leading roles. They continued to play the leads until 1961, after which they appeared only sporadically from 1962 to 1970.

In October 2007, Yuen Siu Fai, who played the Princess's father in 40 performances in Hong Kong and Macau in 2006 and 2007 explained to one academic on a radio talk show broadcast: "This title has become this popular today mostly by word of mouth since the mid-1960s; staged at Kai De Amusement Park Cantonese Opera Theatre. The performances of Chor Fung Ming throughout the 1970s and 1980s in newly developed satellite cities and towns were very well received. The role of male lead is extremely heavy by design and demonstrates the ‘masculine’ traits of Yam style (e.g. Chinese: 走鑼邊花). The more organic actors/actresses in this role would find it more emotionally demanding. It was non-stop and exhausting after intermission."

While most well-known Tang works cater to the female leads, this is an exception. The importance of Zhou Shixian, instead of the Princess, in this 1957 version is also unique compared to other versions such as Eternal Regret of Dynasty Ming (Chinese: 《明末遺恨》) and How Jing-ngo Slew the Tiger (Chinese: 《貞娥刺虎》), both of Peking opera.

== Plot summary ==
At the end of the Chongzhen reign, the emperor, deeply fond of his eldest daughter Princess Changping (Zhu Huini, 朱徽妮), repeatedly ordered the Ministry of Rites to select a consort for her, but she rejected every candidate. One evening, accompanied by Princess Zhaoren (昭仁公主), she went to the paired trees before the Qianqing Palace to choose her husband. There she met Zhou Shixian (周世顯), son of the Court of the Imperial Stud, recommended by Zhou Zhong (周鍾). Impressed by his combined talent and courage, she exchanged poems with him beneath the fragrant camphor tree, sealing their mutual affection and pledging a lifelong bond.

When Chongzhen learned that Zhou Shixian had been chosen as the imperial son‑in‑law, he summoned him to court. Discovering that Zhou was devoted to literature, the emperor lamented that scholarly talent could not save the dynasty in troubled times, yet still granted him the title of Prince Consort. In the midst of the investiture ceremony, war drums suddenly thundered: Li Zicheng's rebel forces had breached Beijing's outer city, and the Ming court stood on the brink of collapse. Seeing that all was lost, Chongzhen bestowed three feet of red silk upon Empress Zhou and Consort Yuan (袁貴妃), then—ignoring Zhou Shixian's desperate pleas—ordered Princess Changping to ascend the hall and die for the nation. In the chaos of parting, he mistakenly killed Princess Zhaoren; Changping, struck by his sword, collapsed but survived. Zhou Zhong discovered her still breathing and carried her home. Chongzhen, after killing his remaining daughters, hanged himself on Coal Hill.

Ten days after the fall of the capital, Princess Changping slowly recovered in Zhou Zhong's household, only to learn that Zhou Zhong and his son intended to present her to the new Qing emperor in exchange for rank and wealth. Overwhelmed by despair, she was saved by the maid Rui‑lan (瑞蘭), who proposed a plan of "transplanting flowers": the abbess of Vimalakirti Convent (維摩庵) would exchange Changping's identity with that of the recently deceased Daoist nun Huijing (慧清), allowing the princess to feign death and escape the Zhou residence. When Zhou Shixian returned to request Changping's remains, he was mocked by Zhou Zhong and his son; disgusted by her family's conduct, Rui‑lan withdrew to the Purple Jade Cottage (紫玉山房).

A year later, Changping—now living as the nun Huijing—encountered Zhou Shixian while gathering firewood on the mountain. Though he tested her repeatedly, she refused to acknowledge her identity. Beneath the image of Guanyin in the convent, Zhou continued to press her; finally, threatening suicide, he compelled her to reveal herself. They agreed to meet that night at the Purple Jade Cottage. Unbeknownst to them, the new abbess discovered their plan and reported it to Zhou Zhong, who rushed to the convent and demanded that Zhou Shixian escort the princess back to the palace to present herself before the Qing emperor.

At the Purple Jade Cottage, Rui‑lan lit the dragon‑and‑phoenix candles (龍鳳花燭) to celebrate the lovers’ reunion. Zhou Shixian arrived with Zhou Zhong, his son, and Qing palace maids to prepare for the princess's return. When Changping met Zhou Shixian, she believed he too sought advancement by betraying the Ming, and in anguish threatened to blind herself with a silver hairpin. After his explanation, she understood that Zhou had devised a careful plan: her return to court would be exchanged for a proper burial for Chongzhen and the rescue of the Ming crown prince. Changping immediately wrote a memorial, and the two vowed that once their mission was accomplished, they would descend together into the Yellow Springs.

Zhou Shixian then negotiated with the Qing emperor, who, wishing to soothe the hearts of former Ming subjects, agreed to all demands, including the burial of the late emperor and the release of the crown prince. Changping finally consented to enter the palace, expressed gratitude for the arrangements, and married Zhou Shixian.

On their wedding night, beneath the same camphor tree where they had first pledged their love, Princess Changping and Zhou Shixian completed their marriage rites. Afterwards, they took poison together, dying side by side for their fallen dynasty.

== Notable performances ==
=== Loong Kim Sang 2019 ===
From 28 November 2019 to 14 December 2019, the Loong Kim Sang performance commemorated 30 years since the passing of her mentor Yam Kim Fai.

=== Peking opera 2018 ===
According to Yu Kuizhi, this production was inspired by the (late 2006 to early 2007) performances at the Lyric Theatre, Hong Kong.

Yu talked specifically how much the 2006 performance of Loong Kim Sang impressed him and addressed Loong as sensei (meaning accomplished, to show respect to someone who has achieved a certain level of mastery in an art form or some other skill) throughout that event.

=== Films/CD/DVD ===
A film adaptation directed by Wong Tin-lam and starring some of the Cantonese opera original cast was released in 1959. The album of the full 4-hour stage version was released in 1960. In 1976, the 1959 film was remade by director John Woo as Princess Chang Ping starring the Chor Fung Ming (Young Phoenix) Cantonese Opera Troupe along Leung Sing Bor and Lang Chi Bak. A live recording of the stage performance by Chor Fung Ming (Young Phoenix) Cantonese Opera Troupe in December 2007 to celebrate the 50th anniversary of debut is available in DVD/CD.

=== TV ===
TV stations, in Hong Kong as well as Taiwan, have a few productions relating to the 1957 version, some of which are renamed. In 1981, ATV Home adapted the play into a television drama titled Princess Cheung Ping (Chinese: 武侠帝女花), in a wuxia setting, starring Damian Lau, Michelle Yim and David Chiang. In 2003, TVB produced Perish in the Name of Love, a television series loosely based on the original play. Steven Ma and Charmaine Sheh starred in the leading roles.

=== Summary ===
- 1959 Film - Dinü hua at IMDb, Story by Disheng Tang.
- 1976 Film - Princess Chang Ping at IMDb, directed by John Woo, Story by Disheng Tang.
- 1981 ATV Home production - Renamed :(Chinese: 武俠帝女花)
- 1994 Taiwan production - Renamed in PRC as :(Chinese: 亂世不了情 translated as Luan Shi Bu Le Qing) by Director: Lai Kin-kwok (Chinese: 賴建國), starring Cecilia Yip and Angie Chiu as the male lead and female lead respectively.
- 2003 TVB production Perish in the Name of Love
- 2008 50th Anniversary DVD (Live Recording of Stage Production)
