= Little Thunder (cartoonist) =

Hong Kong cartoonist

Little Thunder (Chinese: 門小雷, born 17 April 1984) is a popular Hong Kong–based cartoonist. In addition to authoring several graphic novels, including the three-volume surrealist comic Kylooe, Little Thunder has drawn illustration books such as the recent The Blister Exists. Her work has appeared in anthologies such as Special Comix and been translated into French by Kana press. Little Thunder also has a significant following on internet platform, Instagram.

== Biography and works ==
Little Thunder began drawing comics as a teenager and quickly expanded into video game and commercial illustration. becoming a full time artist in 2001, she won Best New Artist Award at the China Japan Comics Exchange in 2002. In the mid-2000s, Little Thunder created the three-volume comic Kylooe, which was published in 2010 by Kana press. The story is set in Little Thunder's hometown, Hong Kong, and follows a young girl who meets a Totoro-like fantastical creature.

In 2013, Little Thunder attended Angoulême International Comics Festival with fellow Hong Kong cartoonist Siu Hak. In 2017, Little Thunder released Blister Exists, an anthology of illustrations about pole dancing.
