= Ko Shing Theatre =

Coordinates: 22.286379°N 114.146361°E

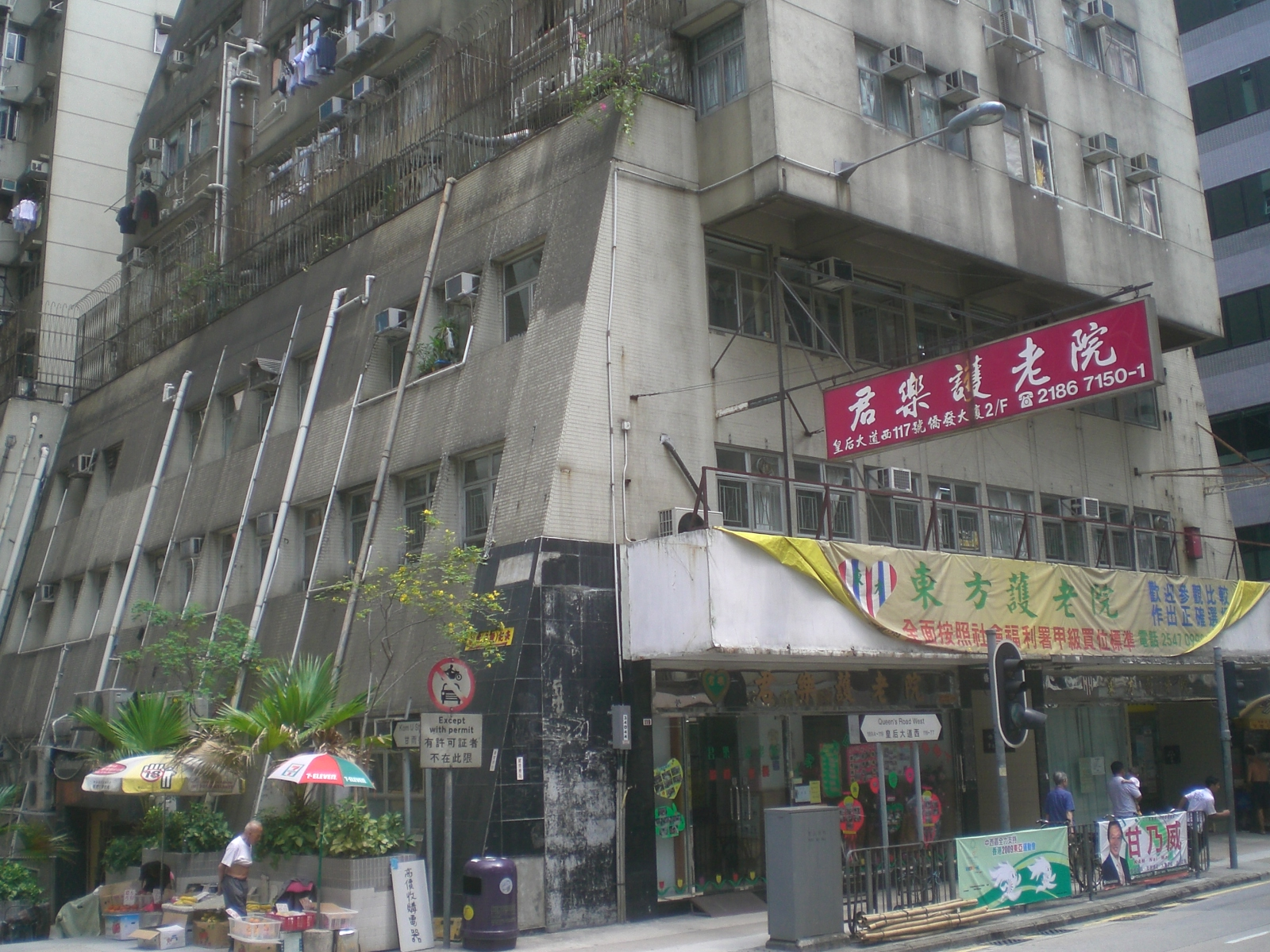
Kiu Fat Building (僑發大廈) occupies the location of the former Ko Shing Theatre.

Ko Shing Theatre (Chinese: 高陞戲院), in Sheung Wan, Central and Western District, was Hong Kong's second indoor opera movie theatre.

The theatre was built in 1890 (other sources mention earlier dates). It was rebuilt and renovated several times and was finally demolished in 1973.

The former site of the Theatre, at 117 Queen's Road West, is part of the Central and Western Heritage Trail, Sheung Wan Route.

== See also ==
- Lee Theatre
- Yau Ma Tei Theatre
- Cantonese opera
- List of cinemas in Hong Kong
- P&T Group
