= Pak Suet Sin =

Pak Suet Sin (白雪仙)
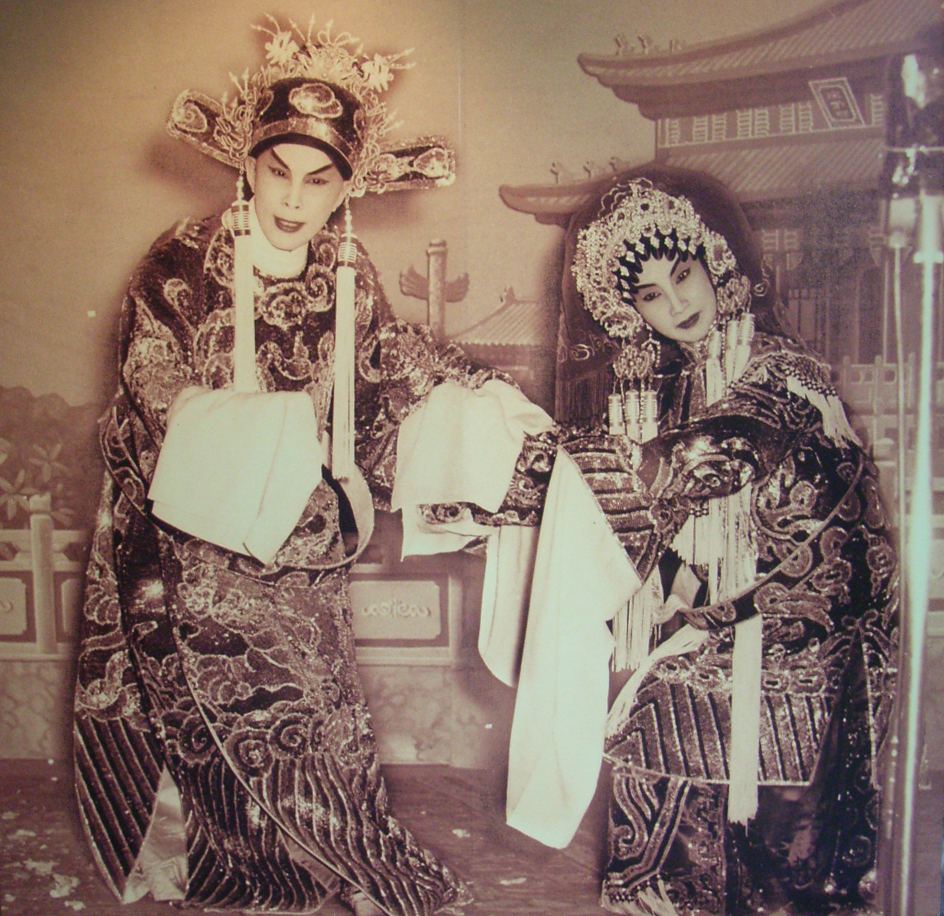
- Bak Sheut-sin (right) with Yam Kim-Fai in a still for their opera Princess Chang Ping.
- Born: Chan Shuk-leung 陳淑良; 19 May 1928 (age 97); Guangzhou, China
- Occupation(s): Actress; Performer
- Awards: Hong Kong Film Awards – Life Achievement Award; 2001 Lifetime Achievement

Chinese name
Transcriptions
Standard Mandarin
- Hanyu Pinyin: Bái Xuěxiān
Yue: Cantonese
- Jyutping: Baak6 Syut3 Sin1
- Musical career
- Also known as: Bai Xuexian
- Origin: Hong Kong
- Genres: Cantonese opera

Pak Suet Sin
- Chinese: 白雪仙
Transcriptions
Standard Mandarin
- Hanyu Pinyin: Bái Xuěxiān
Yue: Cantonese
- Jyutping: baak6 syut3 sin1

Pak Suet Sin (born 19 May 1928 in Guangzhou, Guangdong, China), also known as Bai Xuexian, is a retired Cantonese opera actress and singer based in China and Hong Kong.

== Career ==
Bak is notable for pairing up with fellow Cantonese opera star Yam Kim Fai. Two of her major works are The Peony Pavilion and Tai Nui Fa. She has received awards from The Hong Kong Academy for Performing Arts and Hong Kong University for her contribution to the opera art form. In April 2001 she received a "Lifetime achievement award" from the Hong Kong Film Awards from Chief Secretary for Administration Anson Chan. Awarded Gold Bauhinia Star by the Hong Kong Government in 2013.

== See also ==
- Yam Kim Fai
