= Diplomatic struggle for Zadar =

- 1918–1919 Italian attempt to annex Zadar; Part of the Adriatic question and Inter-war period
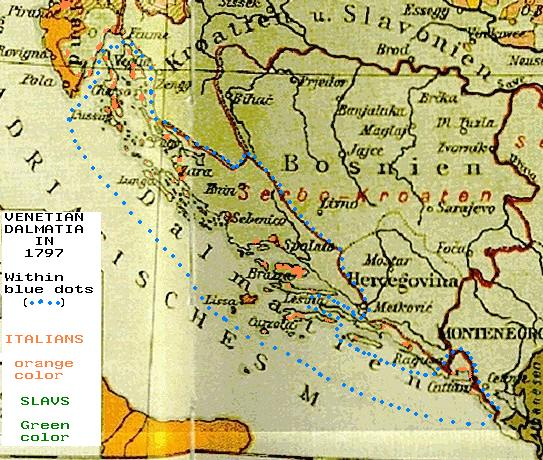
- Austrian linguistic map from 1896, showing the borders (marked with blue dots) of Venetian Dalmatia (as of 1797). The areas where the most widespread mother tongue was Italian are highlighted in orange, while those where the southern Slavic languages were most widespread are highlighted in green.
- Date: November 4, 1918 – January 1, 1919
- Location: Zara and the rest of Dalmatia
- Goals: Annexation of Dalmatia (including Zara) to the Kingdom of Italy
- Result: Italian military victory: Italy annexes Zara, Lagosta, Cazza, the Pelagosa arcipelago and more islands of the Adriatic Sea

Parties
Kingdom of Italy	Kingdom of Serbs, Croats and Slovenes

Lead figures
Enrico Millo; Luigi Ziliotto; Gabriele D'Annunzio; Luigi Rizzo; Giovanni Host-Venturi; Guido Keller; Ernesto Cabruna; Giovanni Giuriati	Stjepan Radić; Jerko Machiedo (POW); Josip Smodlaka; Ante Trumbić; Ivan Meštrović

The diplomatic struggle for Zadar (1918–1919) was a series of efforts to preserve the Croatian coast from Italian encroachments and attempts to keep Zadar (Zara) within Croatia, part of the Kingdom of Serbs, Croats and Slovenes, following the First World War.

== Historical context ==
=== Italians in Dalmatia ===
Dalmatia, especially its maritime cities, once had a substantial local Italian-speaking population (Dalmatian Italians). According to Austrian censuses, the Italian speakers in Dalmatia formed 12.5% of the population in 1865, but this was reduced to 2.8% in 1910.

Another figure, from A. A. Schmidl ("Koenigreich Dalmatien", Stuttgart, 1842) cites the population of Dalmatia being made up of 375,000 "souls", and gives 320,000 Slavs and over 40,000 Italians. Another account, Dainelli ("La Dalmazia", Novara, 1918) the data of the official Austrian censuses of the last half century:

Year	Slavs	Italians	Percentage (Italians)
1865	384,180	55,020	12.5%
1880	440,282	27,305	5.8%
1890	501,307	c. 16,000	3.1%
1900	565,276	15,279	2.6%
1910	610,669	18,028	2.8%

According to the position of June 1, 1929, there are a total of 5,609 Italians on our shores and according to the position of June 1, 1930, only 4,900, because 709 people emigrated in the last year. In front of the total population of our shores that count 764,699 inhabitants, Italians represent 0.64%.

Considering the largest agglomerations, according to the absolute number, we will see that they exceed 100 inhabitants in these cities (in the 1890s):

City	Italians
Spalato	1,309
Veglia	759
Sussak	644
Ragusa	503
Drenova	380
Curzola	137
Traù	132
Sebenico	128
Lesina	89

In other places the number doesn't even reach 80.

According to the Yugoslav census of 1921, there were 12,553 Italian speakers living in the entire kingdom, 9,365 of whom were in the area of Croatia, Dalmatia, Slavonia, Medjugorje, Veglia and Kastav, and 40 in Montenegro.

=== Zadar on the eve of World War I ===
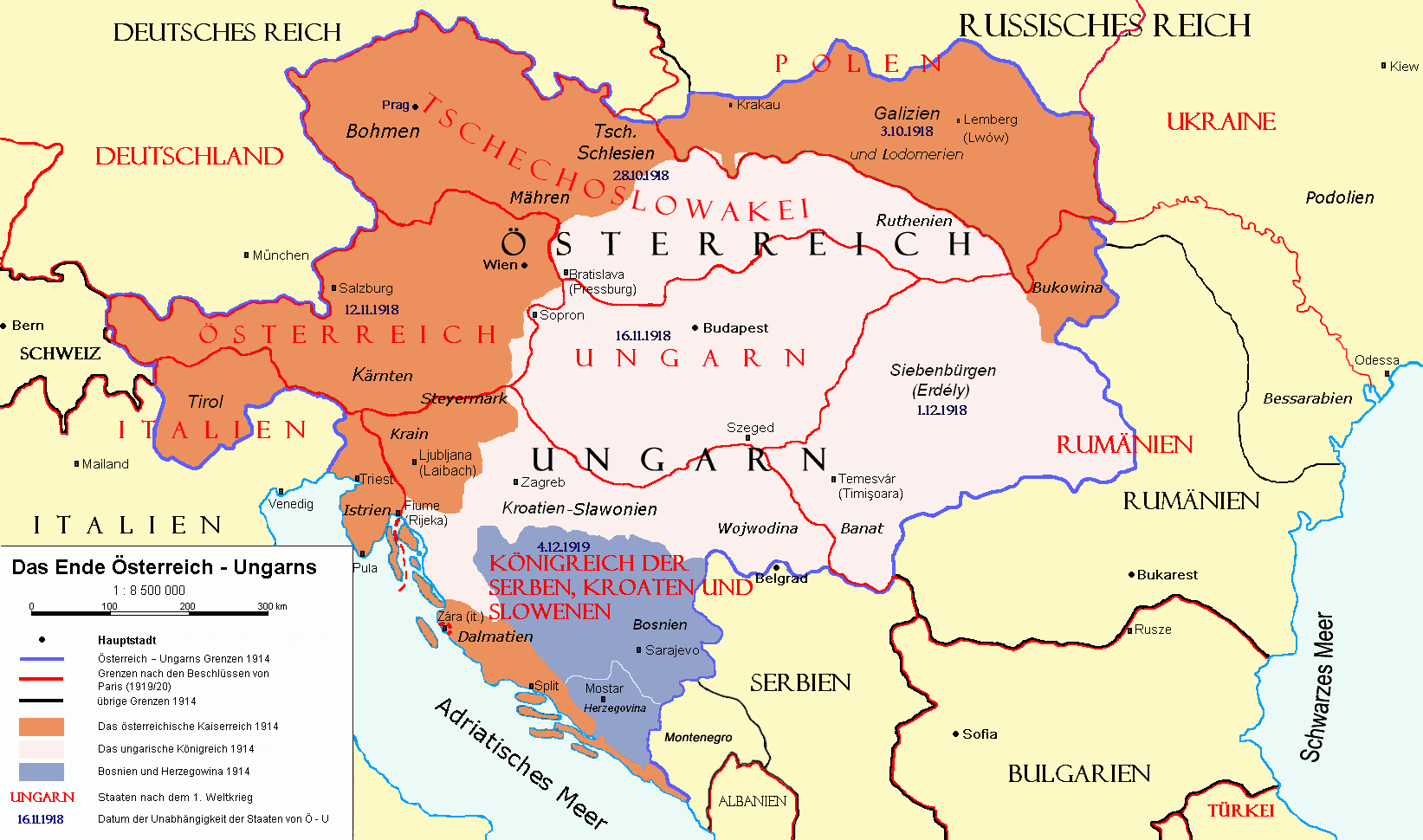
The position of Zara and Dalmatia in Austria–Hungary. Dalmatia belonged to the Austrian part of the monarchy (marked in orange on the map).

The Serbs and Croats agreed on uniting with Dalmatia during the Zadar Declaration (mid-1905). It was a political proclamation of the Serbian parties in the southern Slavic-populated territories of the Austro–Hungarian Empire with the aim of unifying the Croatian and Serbian populated territories of the Empire and achieving greater autonomy. Both declarations soon gave way to the creation of the new Croatian–Serbian coalition, which dominated the autonomous government of Croatia–Slavonia from 1906 until the dissolution of the Empire in the autumn of 1918. The integration of Dalmatia with Croatia-Slavonia and the elevation of the country's position within the monarchy were also discussed in the declaration.

Despite the large number of neutral Italians, strong propaganda promoted the conquest of Dalmatia. There were, of course, other views. Leonida Bissolati, an Italian socialist dissident, was against the Italian appropriation of Dalmatia. He attempted to deliver a speech at a League of Nations meeting in Milan, but was silenced by a crowd chanting "Croati no", which was meant to mean that the Italians did not want any friendship with the Croats. His like-minded colleague Giuseppe Prezzolini published a brochure named «La Dalmazia» in which he realistically portrayed the poor Venetian rule, and used the history of Zara to prove his thesis and refute the Italian claims to Dalmatia. He is also reported to be an "anti-nationalist".

=== The London Pact ===
On April 26, 1915, the government of Italy stipulated a pact in London with representatives of the Triple Alliance, which led to Italy's entry into World War I. In exchange, in case of victory, it would have obtained the entirety of South Tyrol (current Trentino–Alto Adige), the entire Julian March, with the Karst and Isonzo plateaus and the entire Istrian peninsula up to the Quarnaro including Volosca (with the exclusion of Fiume), that is, the entire Alpine line from the Brenner Pass to Monte Nevoso with the islands of Cherso, Lussino and other smaller ones; a third of Dalmatia (including Zara and Sebenico with the islands to the north and west of the coast, together with the neutralization of the rest of Dalmatia from Cape San Niccolò to the Sabbioncello peninsula and from Ragusa to Durazzo in order to guarantee Italian hegemony over the Adriatic Sea; again, Valona and Saseno in Albania and the Adalia coal basin in Turkey, in addition to the confirmation of sovereignty over Libya and the Dodecanese. In the event of the partition of the German colonies in Africa, Italy would have had territorial compensations in Libya, Eritrea and Somalia.

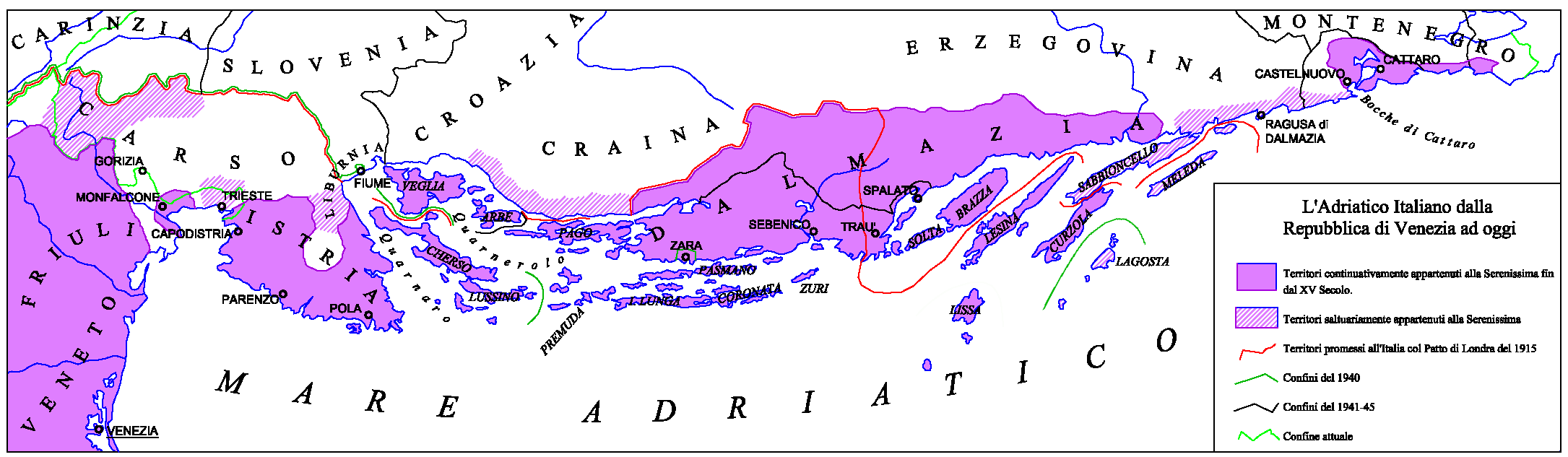
Map of Dalmatia and the Julian March with the borders foreseen by the London Pact (red line) and those actually obtained by Italy (green line). The ancient dominions of the Republic of Venice are indicated in fuchsia.

== Italian occupation ==
=== Military actions around Zara ===
The Collapse of Austria–Hungary was welcomed with joy in Zadar. And all the national communities (Italian, Croatian and Serbian minorities) were in agreement. On October 31, Italy obtained the Allies' consent to the occupation of the territories covered by the London Pact, although without recognising the right to annexation, and so, on November 4, 1918, at 2:45 p.m., the Italian torpedo boat 55 AS sailed to Zadar with 100 soldiers.

Warships of the Regia Marina appeared on the Dalmatian islands and ports, where they made contact with the headquarters of the Fasci nazionali, the local associations of Italians. On 4 November, the Navy took possession of the islands of Lissa, Lagosta, Melada, and Curzola, where the Yugoslav national committees did not put up armed resistance.

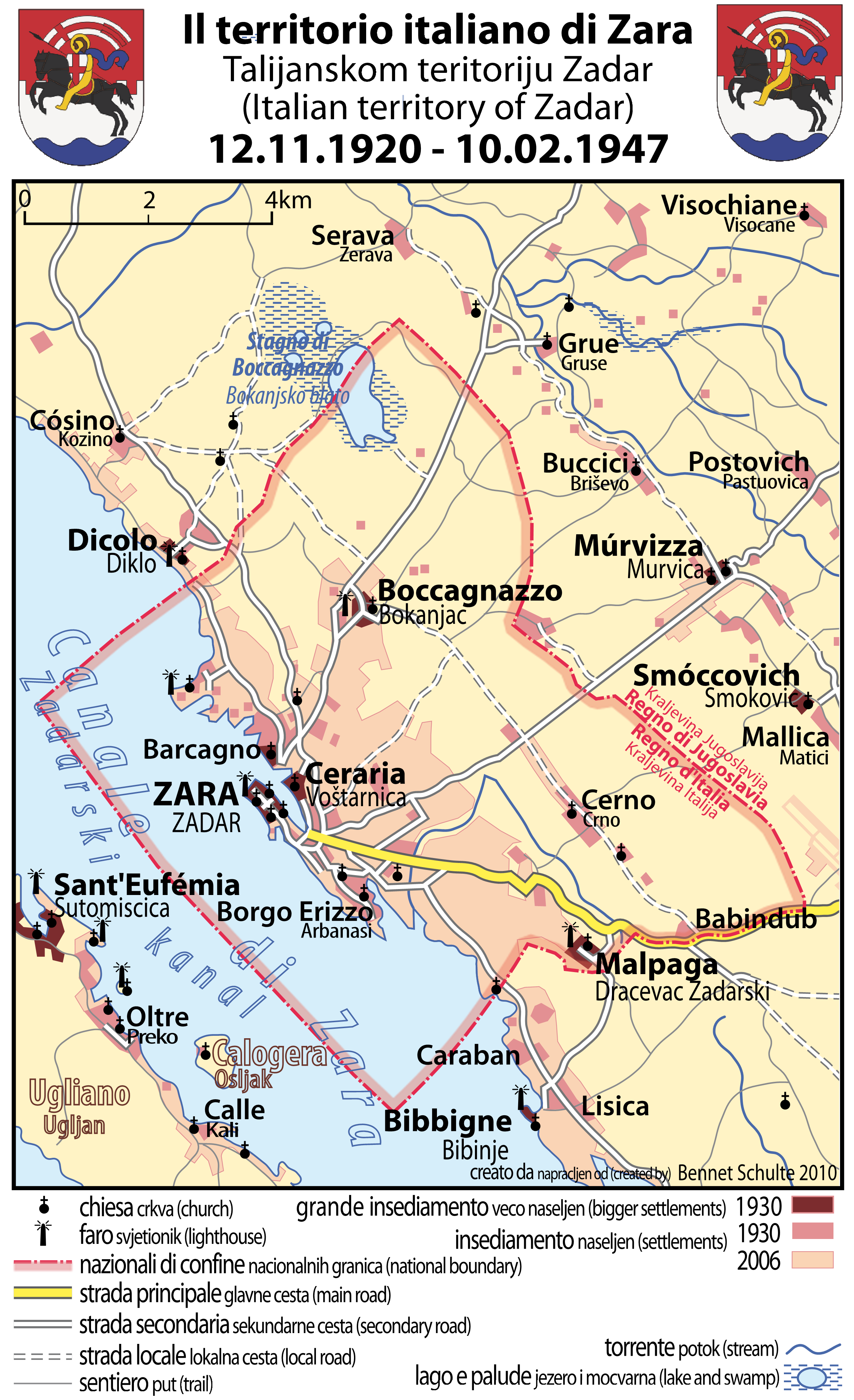
Marked in red, the borders of the province around the city of Zara before the enlargement in 1941. The province originally also included the island of Lagosta with the homonymous municipality, which is located 200 kilometres (120 mi) south of Zara not far from the Tremiti Islands.

On the same day, Zadar was occupied by Lieutenant Commander De Boccard, who was welcomed by Luigi Ziliotto amidst the jubilation of the Italian citizens of Zara, despite the diplomatic protests of the Yugoslav representatives.

The Italians soon sailed into Sebenico, where they had maintained a strong military garrison for years. The process of occupation of the city lasted longer in this case, due to fiere Croat resistance, but the Italians managed to annex the city by November 5–6, 1918. One of the most important of these rebels was Jerko Machiedo, who fought tenaciously for Zadar in order to prove the Croatianization of the city. However, he was soon placed under house arrest by Italian authorities. In early 1919, he was exiled by the Italian authorities to the island of Sardinia and then to the area of Ancona before being returned to Zadar. After the city of Zadar was awarded to Italy under the Treaty of Rapallo, Machiedo left Zadar and moved to nearby Sebenico, then in the newly established Kingdom of Serbs, Croats and Slovenes (later renamed Yugoslavia).

Only on November 9, Rear Admiral Leopoldo Notarbartolo proclaimed the occupation of Dalmatia up to Cape San Niccolò by Italy on behalf of the Entente Powers and the United States.

Other Dalmatian islands were occupied during November: Lesina on November 13, Pago on the 21st, despite the obstructionism of the notables and the clergy. There was a better welcome in Cherso and Lussino, where half the population was Italian. The Regia Marina also went so far as to occupy Veglia and Arbe on November 26, which were islands not included in the London Pact, also due to the appeals of the local Italian notables. Here, too, the Catholic clergy was among the main elements of pro-Yugoslav agitation, so much so that the Italian authorities decided to expel the bishop of Veglia, Monsignor Mahnic.

Gabriele D'Annunzio himself took the initiative to go to Zara on November 14. He embarked on the ship "Nullo" together with other irredentists, such as Guido Keller, Ernesto Cabruna, Giovanni Giuriati, Giovanni Host-Venturi and Luigi Rizzo. In Zara he was kindly welcomed by Admiral Enrico Millo, who before the Poet solemnly made the commitment not to abandon Dalmatia until it had been officially annexed to Italy. However, their goal was not achieved and Italy only received Zara, Lagosta, Cazza and the islands of Pelagosa, although those too were ceded back to Yugoslavia in 1947.

After the 1919 Italian general election held on November 16, Francesco Saverio Nitti was reconfirmed in his second government, which was an unfortunate thing for the nationalists.

=== Control and Management over the province ===
The Italian government appointed Vice Admiral Enrico Millo, former Minister of the Navy and a supporter of the annexation, as "Governor of Dalmatia", and was granted power over the new province.

He established command in Sebenico (a measure that indicated the intention to maintain control of the whole of Dalmatia) until the spring of 1919, when he moved to Zara. Millo removed the Yugoslav national committees from power, although pro-Yugoslav notables remained institutionally represented in the Dalmatian Provincial Diet (which had been already dissolved after the collapse of the empire) and in the Court of Appeal. The old members of the autonomous Italian party, revived in the Fasci nazionali, were appointed civil commissioners or employed by public institutions. The former Habsburg officials, although courted by the new administration, often did not want to take part for fear of reprisals in the event of a return to power of the Yugoslavs.

=== Occupation of the Dalmatian hinterland ===
The Dalmatian hinterland remained a no man's land for the whole month of November, effectively administered by the Yugoslav national committees dependent on Zagreb, while the Italians consolidated their control over the ports and islands. Only with the arrival of reinforcements from across the Adriatic Sea did the Italian army take control of Vodizze (on December 3), and Scardona (on the 5th). The occupation of Tenin was politically and militarily delicate, since only a few Italians lived there, while the Serbian element was strong. Vice Admiral Enrico Millo had to order the Serbian army to withdraw from the territories reserved by the armistice for Italian control, and the advance had to face the armed resistance of Serbian regulars and militias, until it occupied the city on January 1, 1919. Millo's aim was to extend the occupation to the mouth of the Cettina, if not to that of the Narenta. (See: Monzali 2007)

=== Last attempts at unrest ===
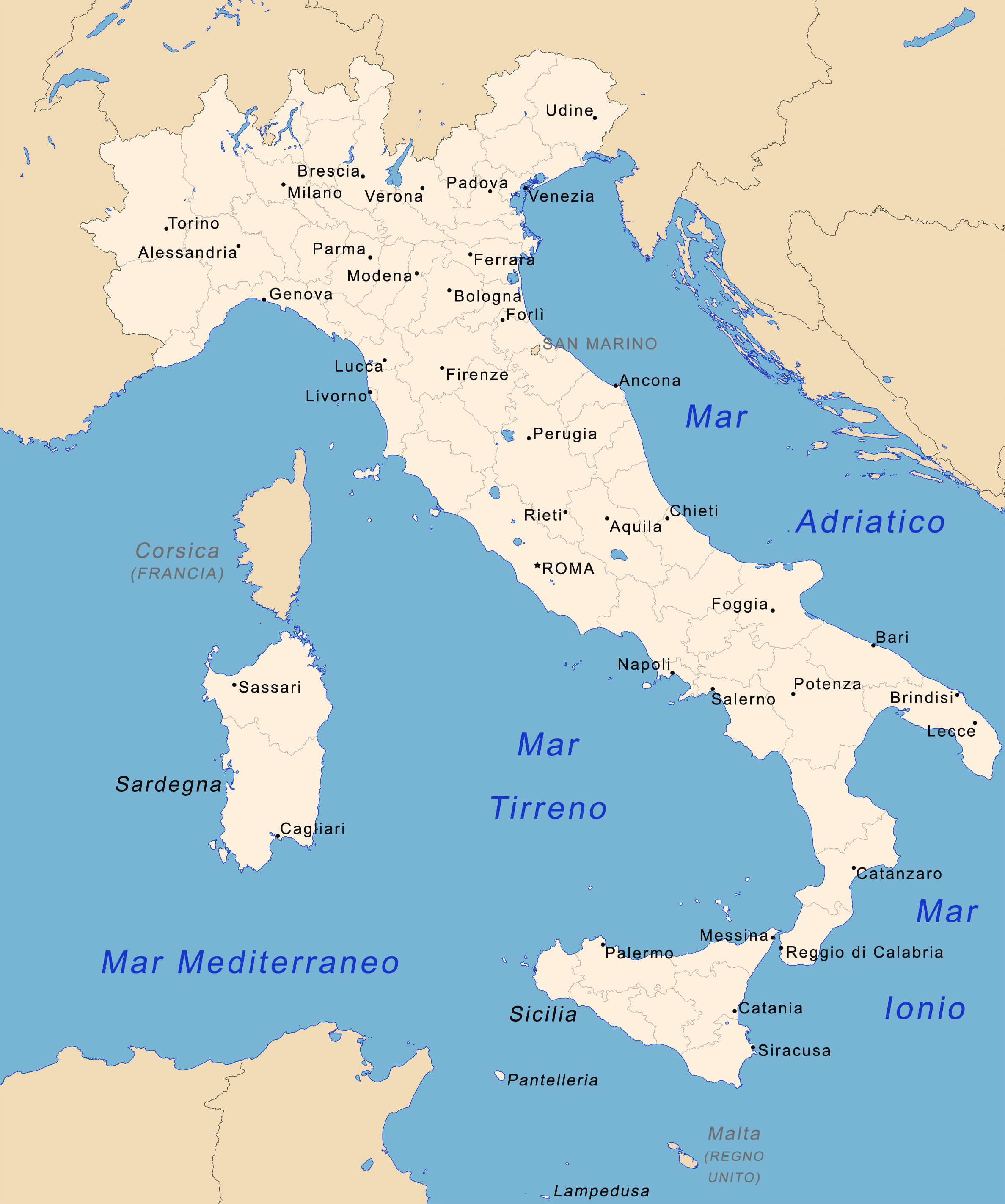
Italy before the Great War (World War I)

Italy in 1924, with the provinces of Gorizia, of Trieste, of Pola, of Fiume, and of Zara

Enrico Millo tried to gain the consensus of the Slavic Dalmatians through the improvement of living conditions: health services, food distributions, and stimulation of the agricultural economy through the prohibition of the import of oil and wine from the peninsula, as well as with an exchange of favor between the Austrian crown and the Italian lira. The Italian authorities left a certain freedom of association, allowing the existence of political and cultural institutions and of a Yugoslav press, with newspapers such as the Narodni list of Zara, despite frequent censorship. In Zara, Sebenico, Lesina and Veglia there were numerous demonstrations against the occupation and for the union with the Kingdom of Yugoslavia, organized by the Catholic and Orthodox clergy, while the Fasci nazionali organized demonstrations of the opposite sign. To crush the protests, Millo imposed expulsions and internments of civilians without trial, attracting criticism from the Americans, while the Yugoslavs saw this as a demonstration of the despotic nature of the Italian occupation.

However, opposition to the Italian administration gradually waned, also due to the internal evolution of the Yugoslav kingdom, in which Serbian supremacy was becoming more and more evident, with the repression against the Croatian peasant movement of the Radić brothers (who were arrested) and the Socialist Party at the beginning of 1919. In this context, the Croatian Catholics in the countryside passively adapted to the Italian occupation. Millo presented his government as the guarantor of social order and defender of Dalmatian Catholics against the Serbian state, considered Orthodox and backward. The pro-Yugoslav movement remained in Zara, Sebenico and Tenin, as well as in Veglia and Lesina.

== Aftermath ==
=== Paris Peace Conference ===
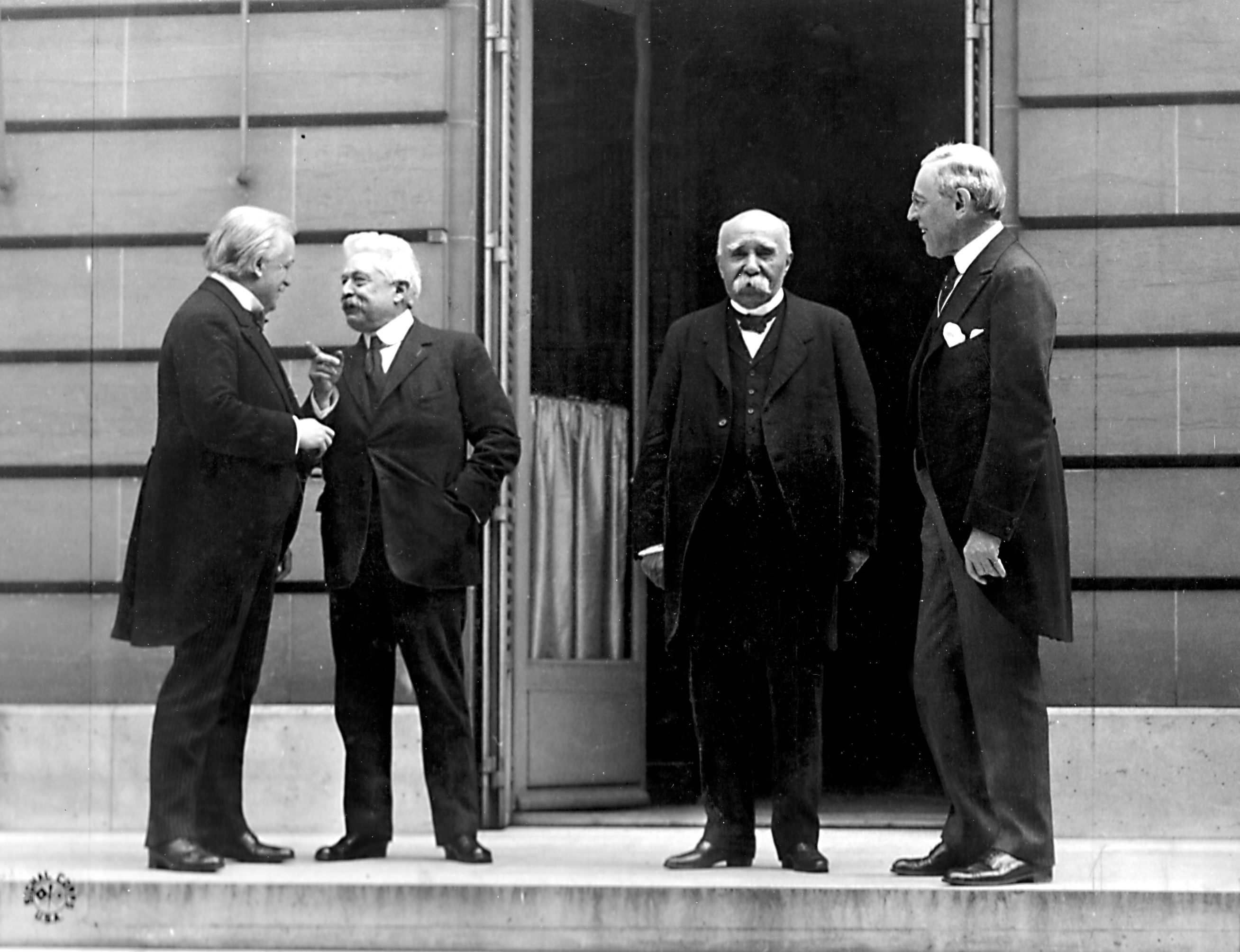
The "Big Four" at the Paris Peace Conference. Left to right: David Lloyd George, Vittorio Emanuele Orlando, Georges Clemenceau, Woodrow Wilson.

On January 18, 1919, the Paris Peace Conference was held to end the hostilities of World War I. The Kingdom of Italy, having been victorious in the conflict, requested the London Pact to be applied, which would have allowed Italy to obtain a good part of Dalmatia with the adjacent islands. The contrasts with American president Woodrow Wilson were clear, as he was not willing to apply the London Pact to the letter and was not willing to accept Rome's requests at the expense of the Slavs, because «it would pave the way for Russian influence and the development of a naval blockade of Western Europe». As such, Austria-Hungary officially ceded Trentino to Italy (including the city of Trento), and other smaller locations, but not the entirety of Dalmatia. The border was secured during the Treaty of Rapallo on November 12, 1920.

== Sources ==
- Bralić, Ante (June 2006). "Zadar u vrtlogu propasti Habsburške Monarhije (1917. – 1918.)". Contemporary History (in Croatian). 38 (1). Hrčak.
- Kann, Robert A.; David, Zdenek V. (1984). The peoples of the Eastern Habsburg Lands, 1526-1918. University of Washington Press. ISBN 0295960957.
- Kovačić, Joško (2014). "Rod Machiedo sa Hvara" [The Machiedo Family from the Island of Hvar]. Prilozi povijesti otoka Hvara (in Croatian). XII (1). Hvar: Muzej hvarske baštine: 225–248. ISSN 0353-0957.
- Malatesta, Leonardo (September 9, 2019). L'impresa di Fiume: D'Annunzio e i suoi legionari in Dalmazia dal 1919 al 1920 (in Italian). Treviso: Editoriale Programma.
- Marjanović, Milan (1964). Diplomatska borba za Zadar 1915. – 1922 (in Croatian). Zvornik, Zadar: Matica hrvatska. pp. 271–299.
- Monzali, Luciano (2007). "Italiani di Dalmazia 1914–1924". Collana: Biblioteca di Nuova Storia Contemporanea (in Italian). 25. Le Lettere. ISBN 9788860870421.
- Pagnacco, Federico (1924). Italiani di Dalmazia. Trieste: University of Trieste.
- Rossi, Angelo (2010) [1938]. Finer, Herman (ed.). The Rise of Italian Fascism: 1918–1922. Translated by Wait, Peter; Wait, Dorothy. New York, NY: Routledge. ISBN 978-0-203-85019-0. OCLC 701703697.
