= Desnica =

Desnica is a surname and a masculine given name. Notable people with the name include:

As a surname

- Damir Desnica (born 1956), Croatian footballer
- Uroš Desnica (politician) (1874–1941), Yugoslav politician
- Uroš Desnica (scientist) (1944–2021), Croatian physicist
- Vladan Desnica (1905–1967), Serbian writer

As a given name

- Desnica Radivojević (born 1952), Bosnian politician
