= Ante Tresić Pavičić =

Politician and writer in the kingdoms of Croatia-Slavonia and Yugoslavia

- Born: 10 July 1867; Vrbanj, Kingdom of Dalmatia, Austria-Hungary (now Croatia)
- Died: 27 October 1949 (aged 82); Split, Federal People's Republic of Yugoslavia (now Croatia)
- Occupation(s): Writer, politician, diplomat

Ante Tresić Pavičić (10 July 1867 – 27 October 1949) was a Croatian writer and politician born in Vrbanj on the island of Hvar. He studied philosophy, history and geography at the University of Vienna and pursued writing and political careers. In 1904, Tresić Pavičić was elected a member of the Imperial Council of Austria-Hungary representing his native crown land of the Kingdom of Dalmatia. Following the outbreak of the First World War, he was interned together with brothers Prvislav and Ivo Grisogono and writer Niko Bartulović for their political views favouring Yugoslavism over preservation of Austria-Hungary. In the final days of the war, he joined the National Council of Slovenes, Croats and Serbs in pursuit of political unification of the South Slavs. After the end of the war, the dissolution of Austria-Hungary and establishment of the Kingdom of Serbs, Croats and Slovenes (later renamed Yugoslavia), Tresić Pavičić joined the diplomatic service of the new state. From 1919 to 1927 he worked in the diplomatic service in Madrid and Washington, D.C. before retiring and moving to Split. He wrote poetry and prose. Today, he is primarily appreciated as a writer of travel literature.
