= Grisogono =

Grisogono may refer to:

- De Grisogono, Swiss luxury jeweller founded in 1993
- Ivo Grisogono (1871–1945), a Croatian and Yugoslav judge and public prosecutor
- Prvislav Grisogono (1879–1969), a Croatian and Yugoslav lawyer and politician
