= Uroš Desnica =

Uroš Desnica may refer to:

- Uroš Desnica (politician) (1874–1941), Croatian Serb politician, grandfather of Uroš Desnica born in 1944
- Uroš Desnica (scientist) (1944–2021), Croatian scientist, grandson of Uroš Desnica born in 1874
