= Bernardino Maccarucci =

Italian architect

Bernardino Maccarucci (c. 1728 – 1798) was an Italian architect, active in his native Venice.

He was a pupil of Giorgio Massari, but most of his work in the declining republic was merely in reconstructions and restorations. He helped build the facade of the church of San Rocco (1765–71) and of the Scuola della Carità (1766, design by Massari, now the Gallerie dell'Accademia of Venice); he worked in the palazzo del Ridotto (1768) and one of the Banquet rooms in the Palazzo Ducale. In Mestre, he designed the construction of the Chiesa Collegiata. In Padua, he helped build the Palazzo del Capitanio (1779). He died in Venice.

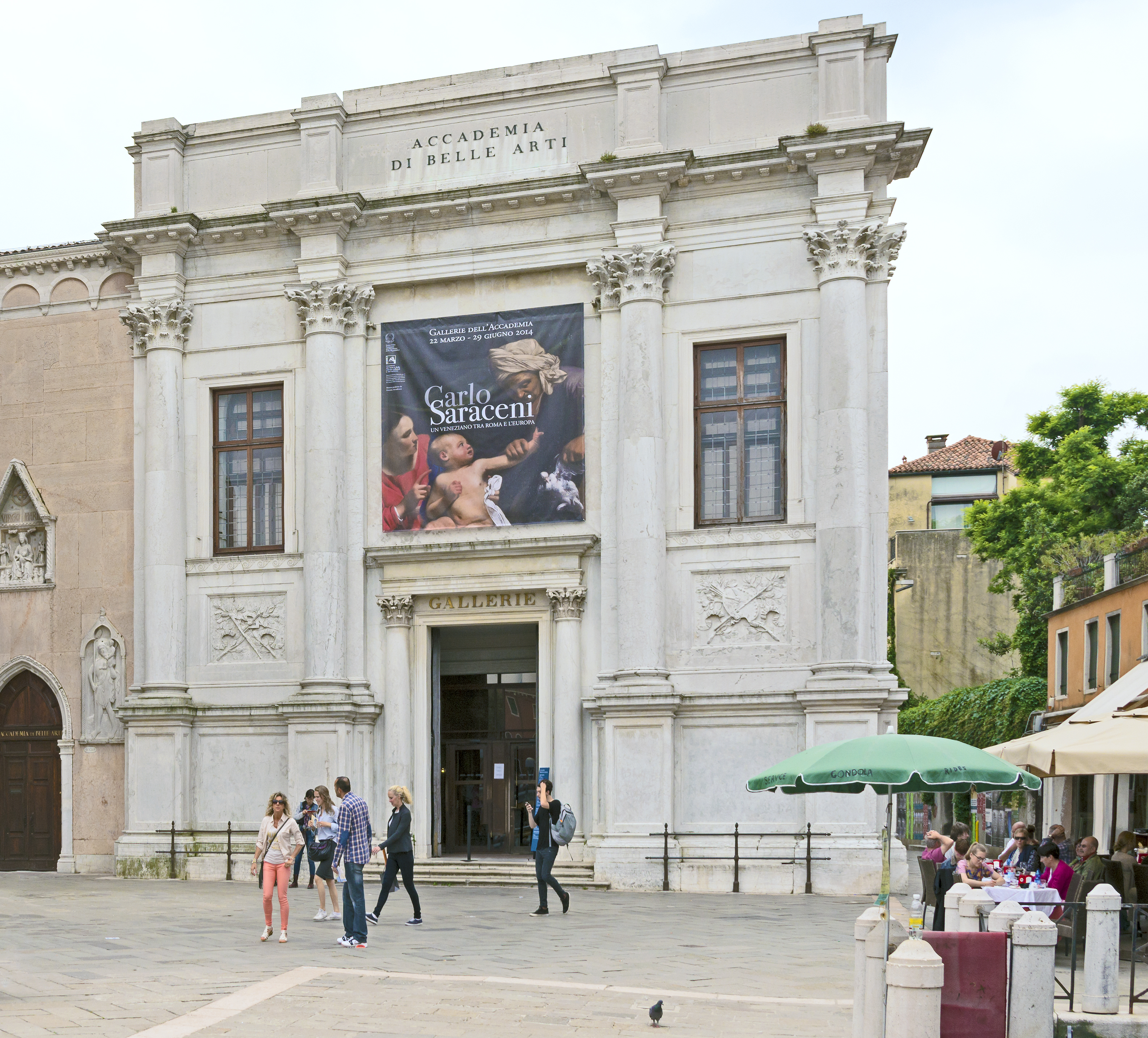
Facade of the Scuola della carità

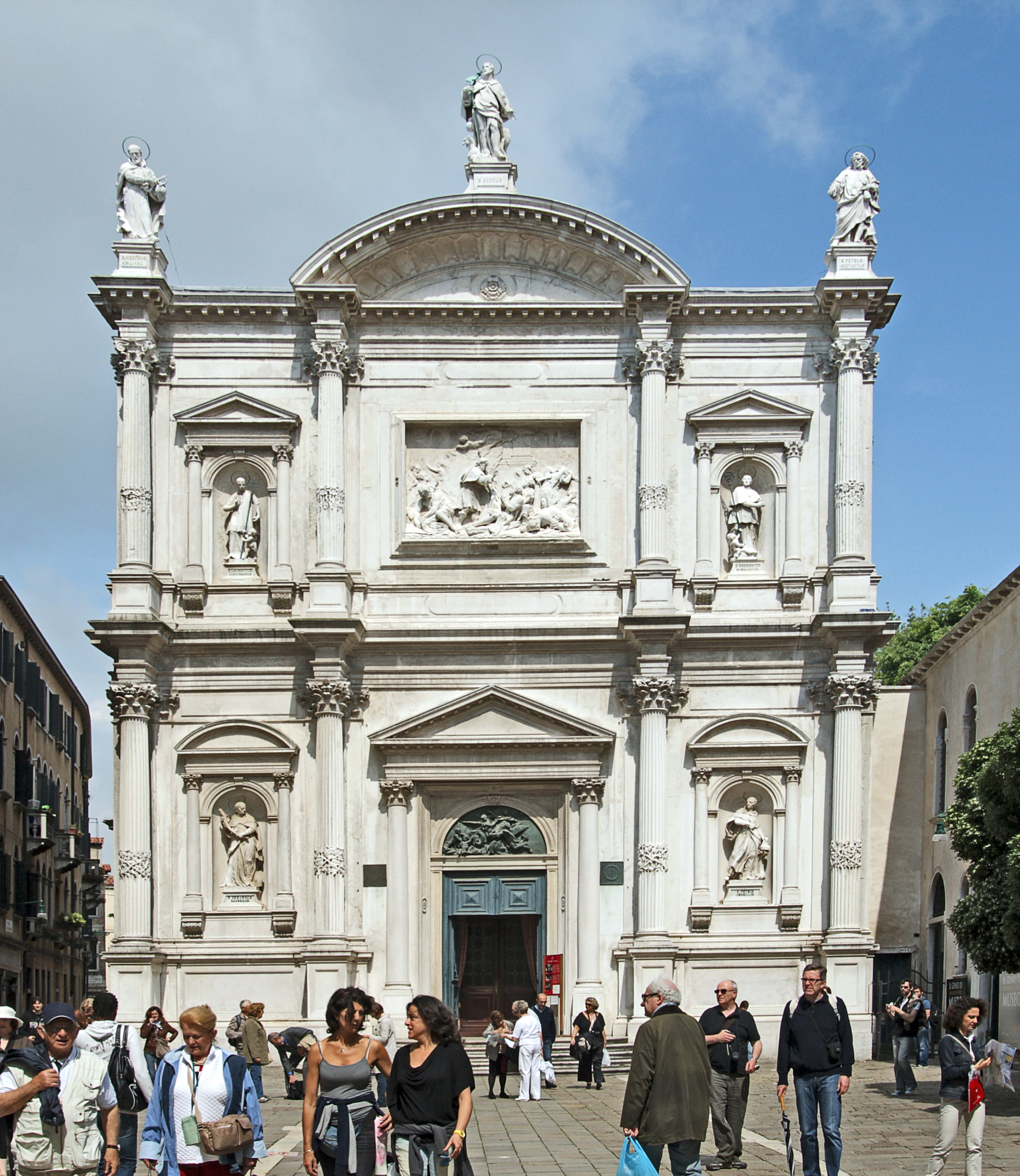
Facade of the church of San Rocco

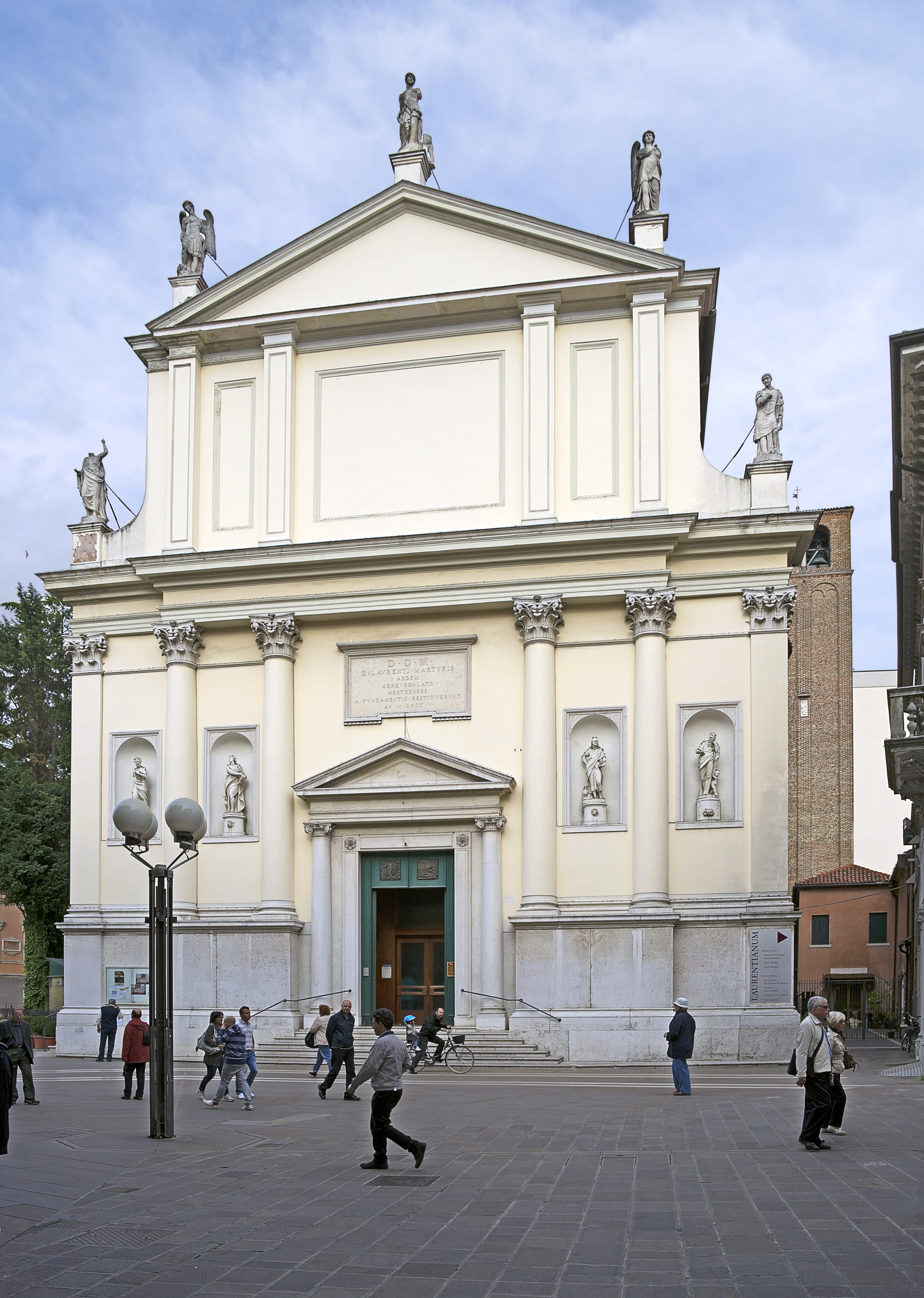
Facade of San Lorenzo Cathedral in Mestre

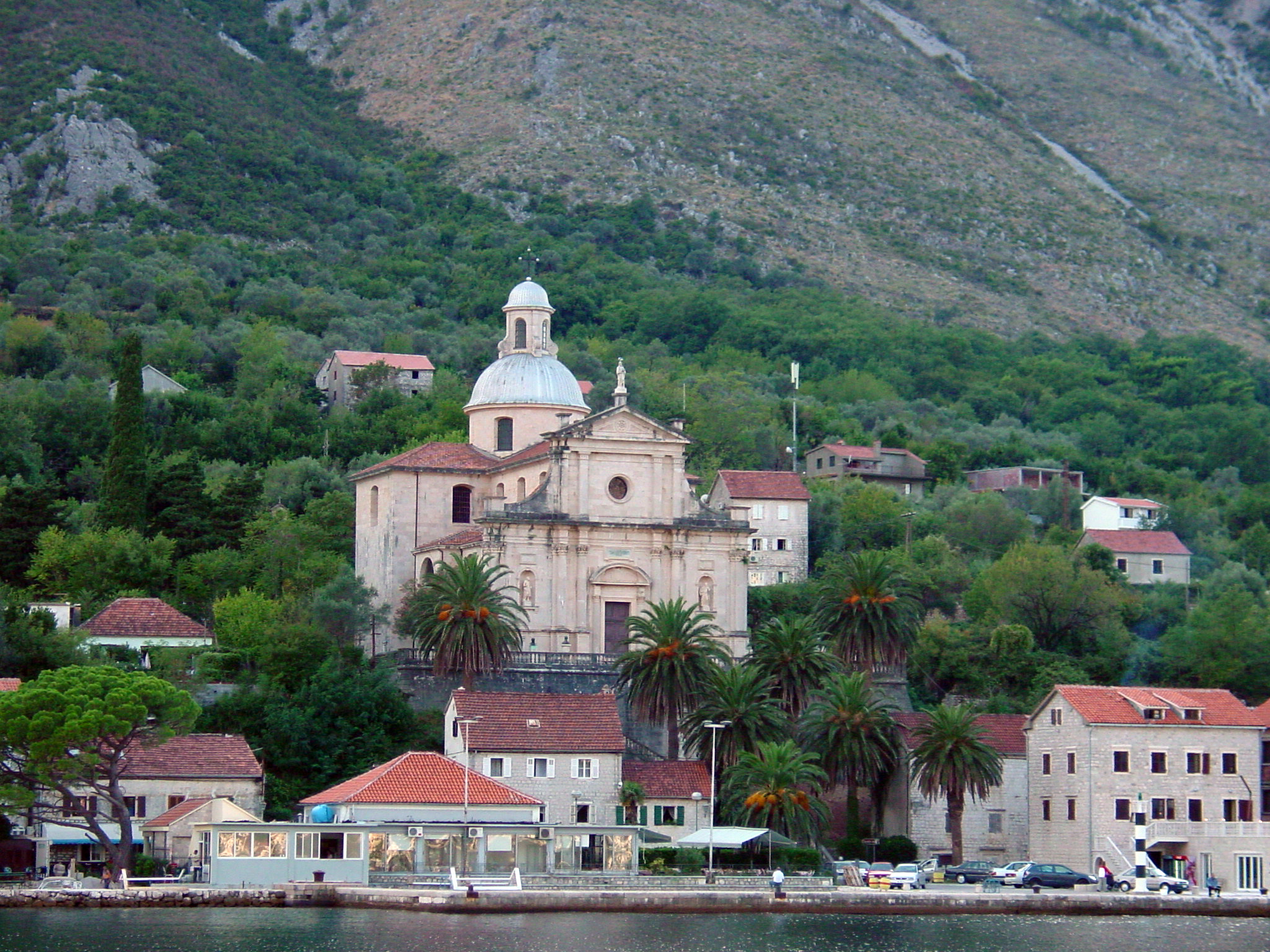
The church of the Nativity of the Blessed Virgin Mary in Prčanj

== Sources ==
- Treccani encyclopedia entry
