= San Rocco, Venice =

Roman Catholic church in Venice, Italy

Church of Saint Roch Chiesa di San Rocco
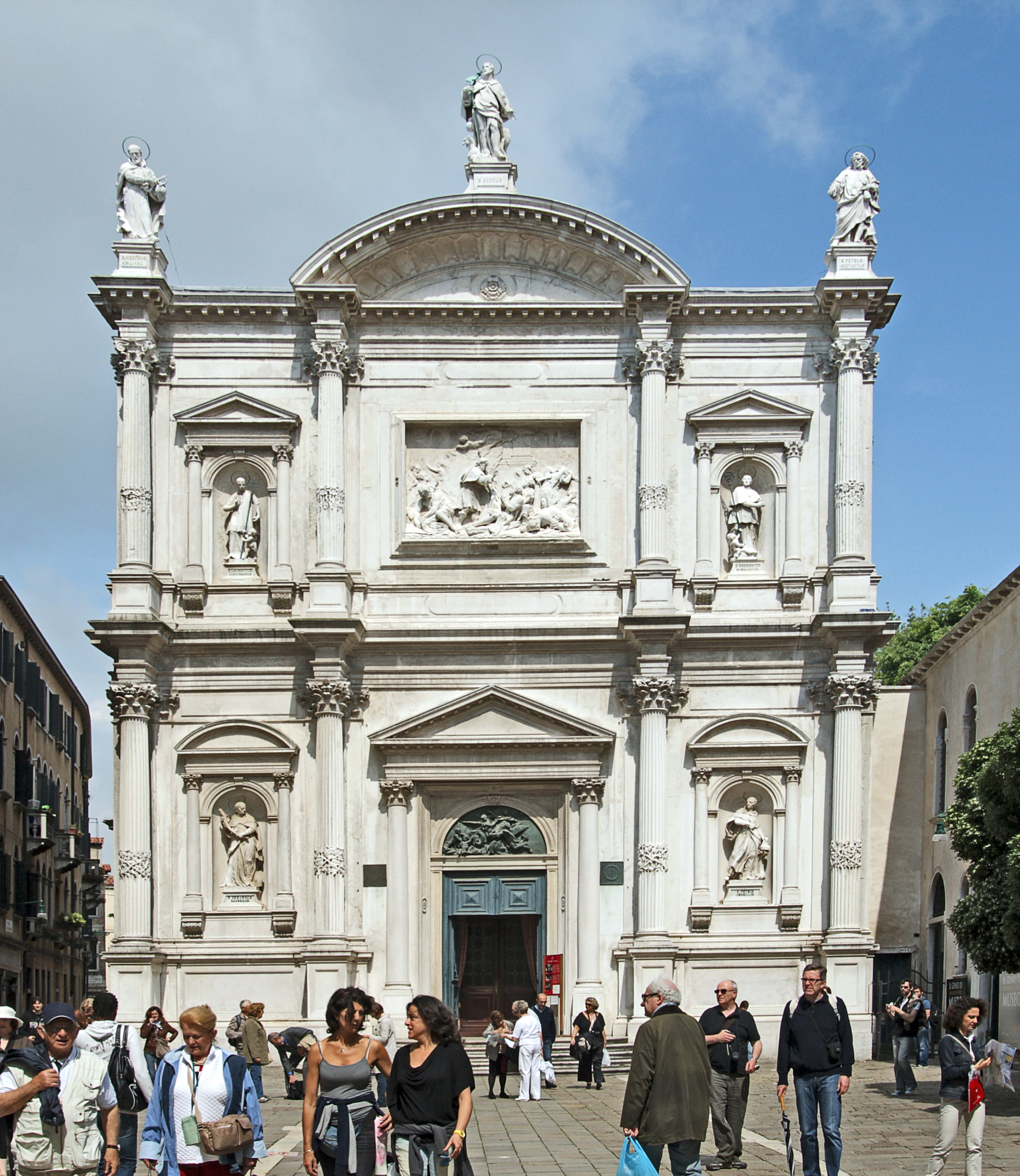
- Facade of the Chiesa di San Rocco.

- Location within Venice Location within Italy

Religion
- Affiliation: Roman Catholic
- Year consecrated: 1508
- Status: Active

Location
- Location: Venice, Italy
- Coordinates: 45°26′13.1″N 12°19′30.94″E

Architecture
- Architect: Bartolomeo Bon
- Type: Church
- Style: Renaissance
- Groundbreaking: 1489
- Completed: 1771

Specifications
- Length: 40 metres (130 ft)
- Width: 20 metres (66 ft)

The Church of Saint Roch (Italian: Chiesa di San Rocco) is a Roman Catholic church dedicated to Saint Roch in Venice, northern Italy. It was built between 1489 and 1508 by Bartolomeo Bon the Younger, but was substantially altered in 1725. The façade dates from 1765 to 1771, and was designed by Bernardino Maccarucci. The church is one of the Plague-churches built in Venice.

St. Roch, whose relics rest in the church after their transfer from Voghera (trad. Montpellier), was declared a patron saint of the city in 1576. Every year, on his feast day (16 August), the Doge made a pilgrimage to the church.

Near the church is the Scuola Grande di San Rocco, noted for its numerous Tintoretto paintings. It was founded in the 15th century as a confraternity to assist the citizens in time of plague.

== Description ==
=== Exterior ===
The facade is decorated within years years 1765–1769 in collaboration with major Venetian sculptors of its time. On the semicircular tympanum stands the statue of Saint Roch by Giuseppe Bernardi. On the sides are statues of Saint Gerolamo Emiliani and Blessed Pietro Acotanto. In the second register is a relief of Saint Roch healing the plague stricken by Giovanni Morlaiter. In the niches on the sides are statues of Saints Lorenzo Giustiniani and Gregorio Barbarigo by Antonio Gai. In the first register flanking the main entrance are Saints Gerardo Sagredo and Pietro Orseolo by Giovanni Marchiori. The main portal has a bronze copy relief of the Glory of Saint Roch by Malchiori. The marble original is inside the church.

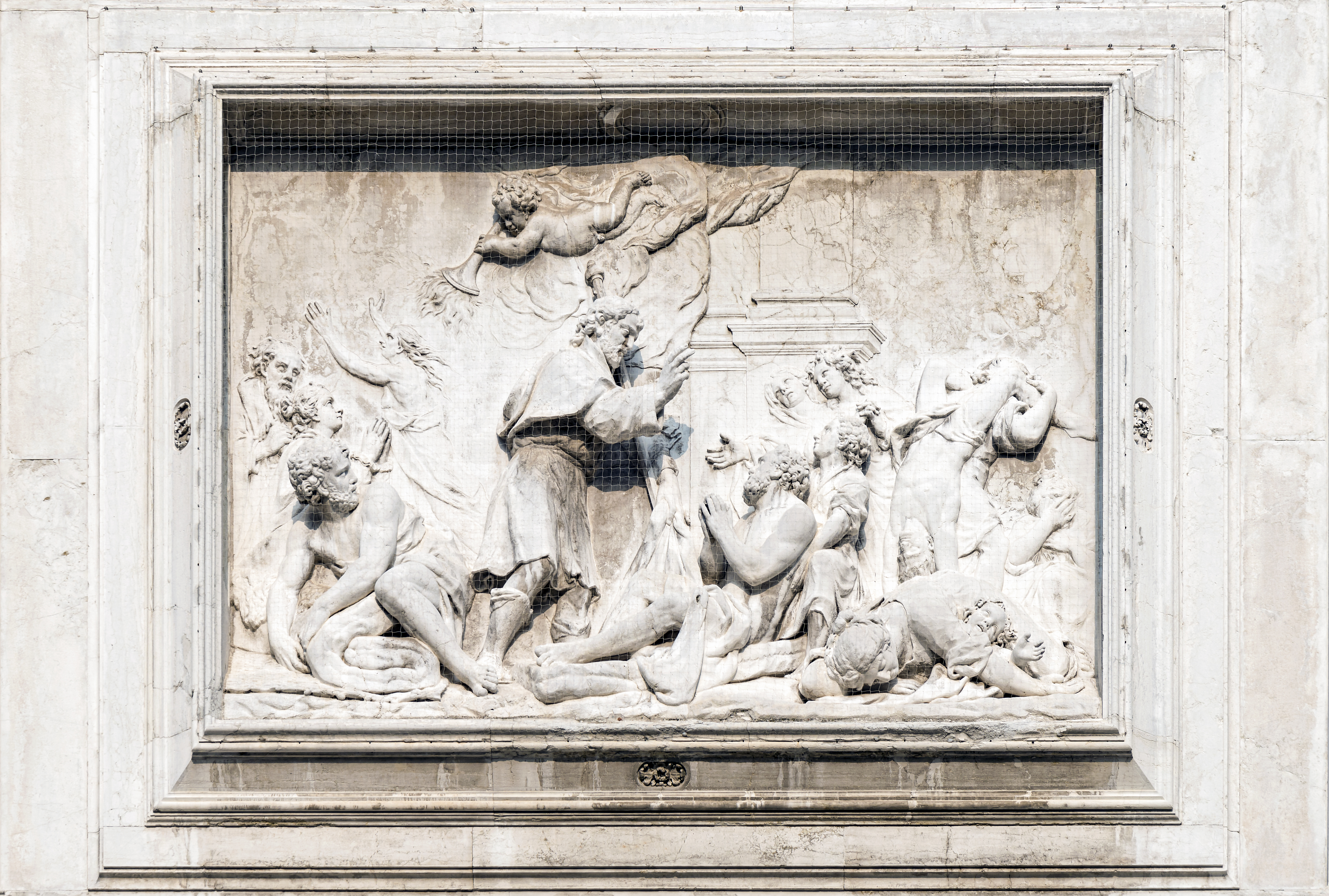
San Rocco heals the victims of the plague by Giovanni Maria Morlaiter

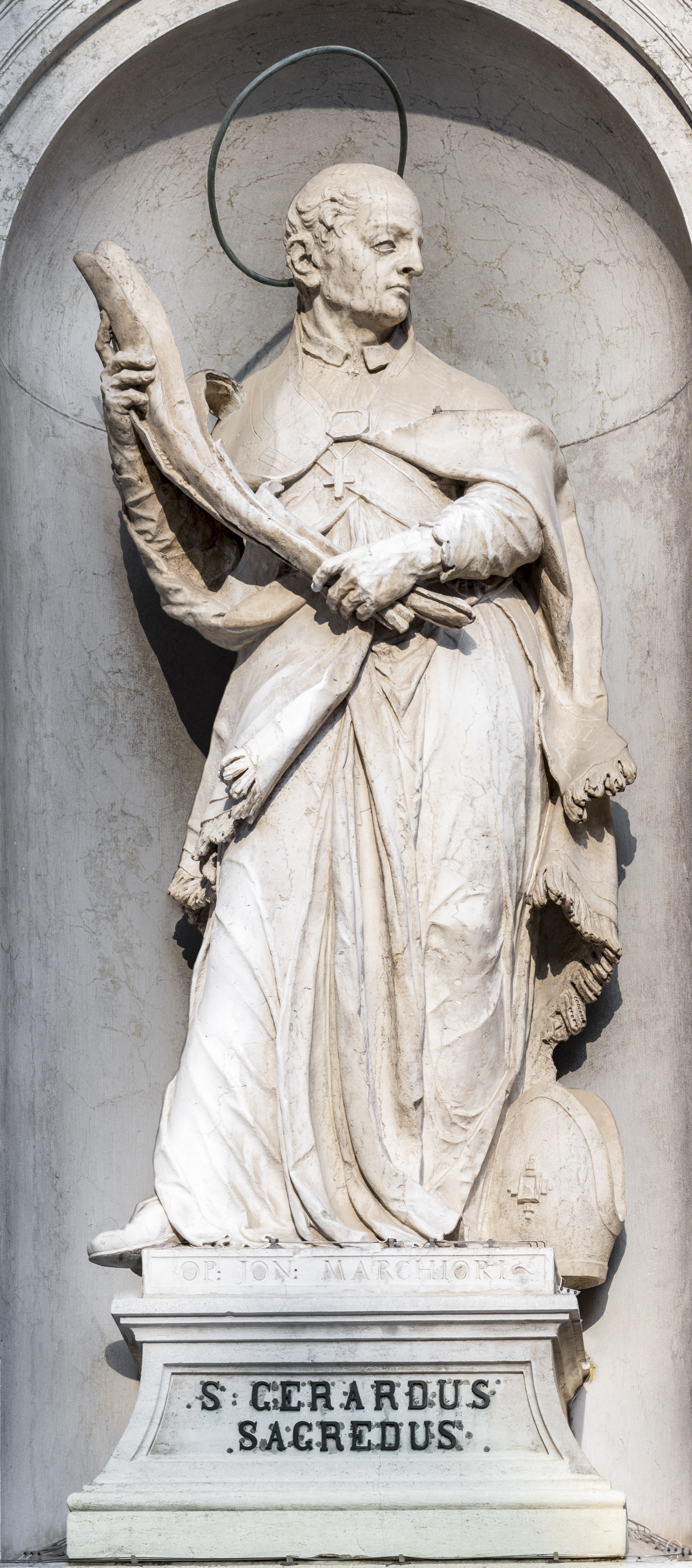
Saint Gerardo Sagredo

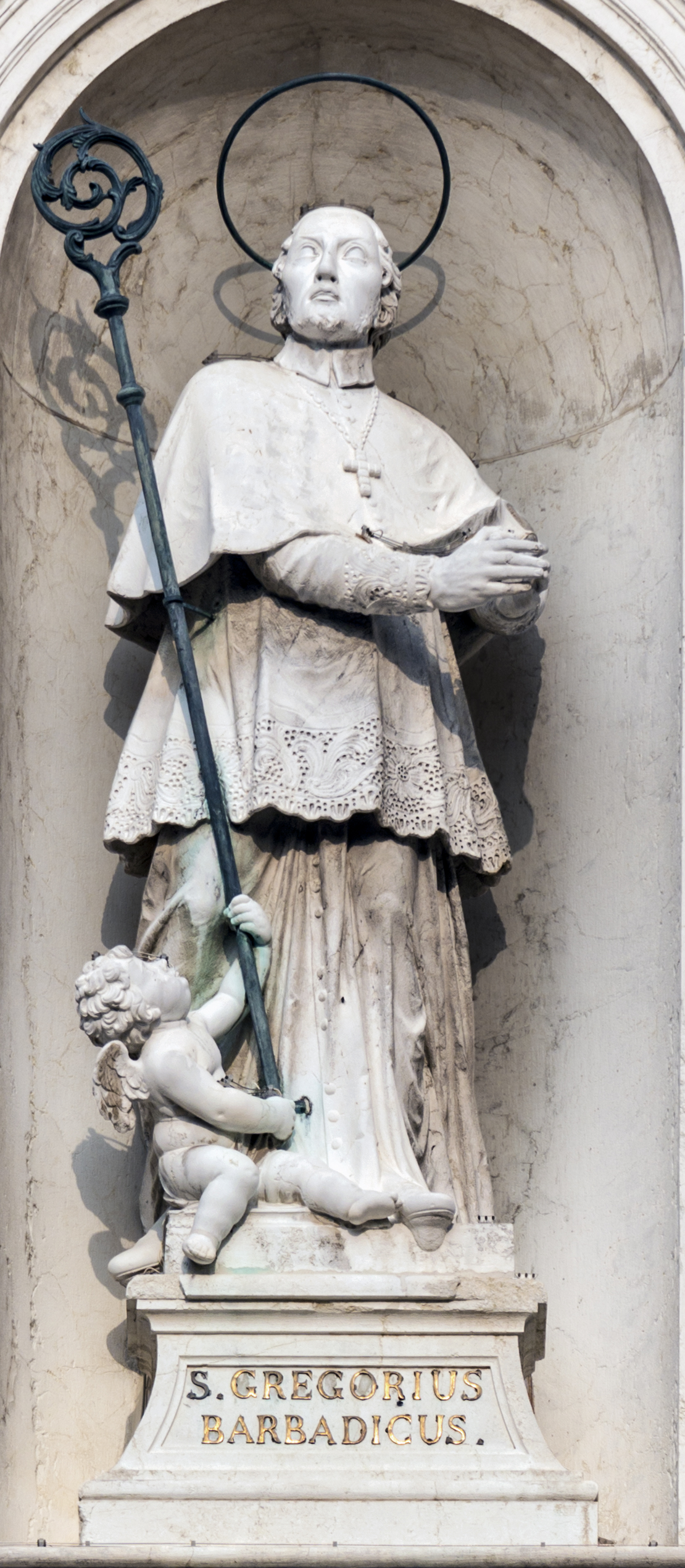
Saint Gregorio Barbarigo

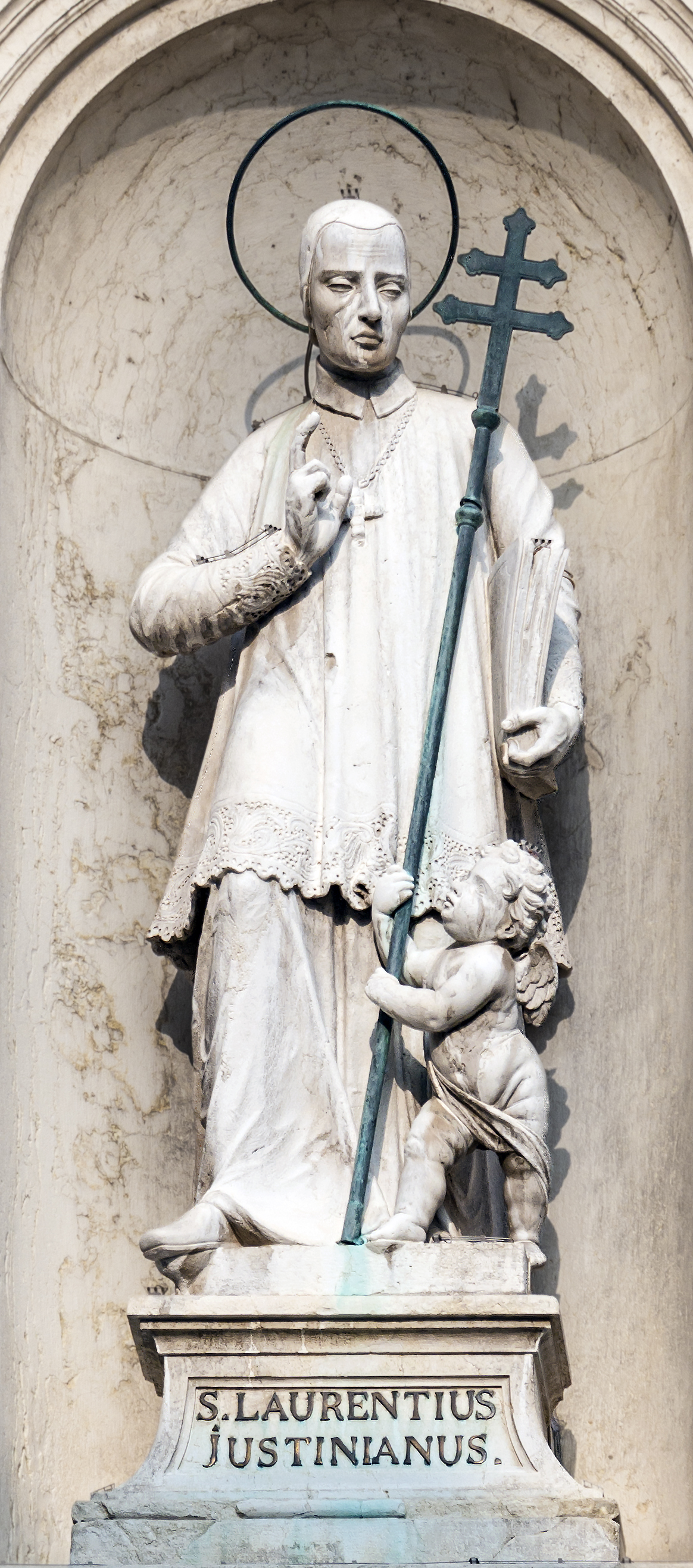
Saint Lorenzo Giustiniani

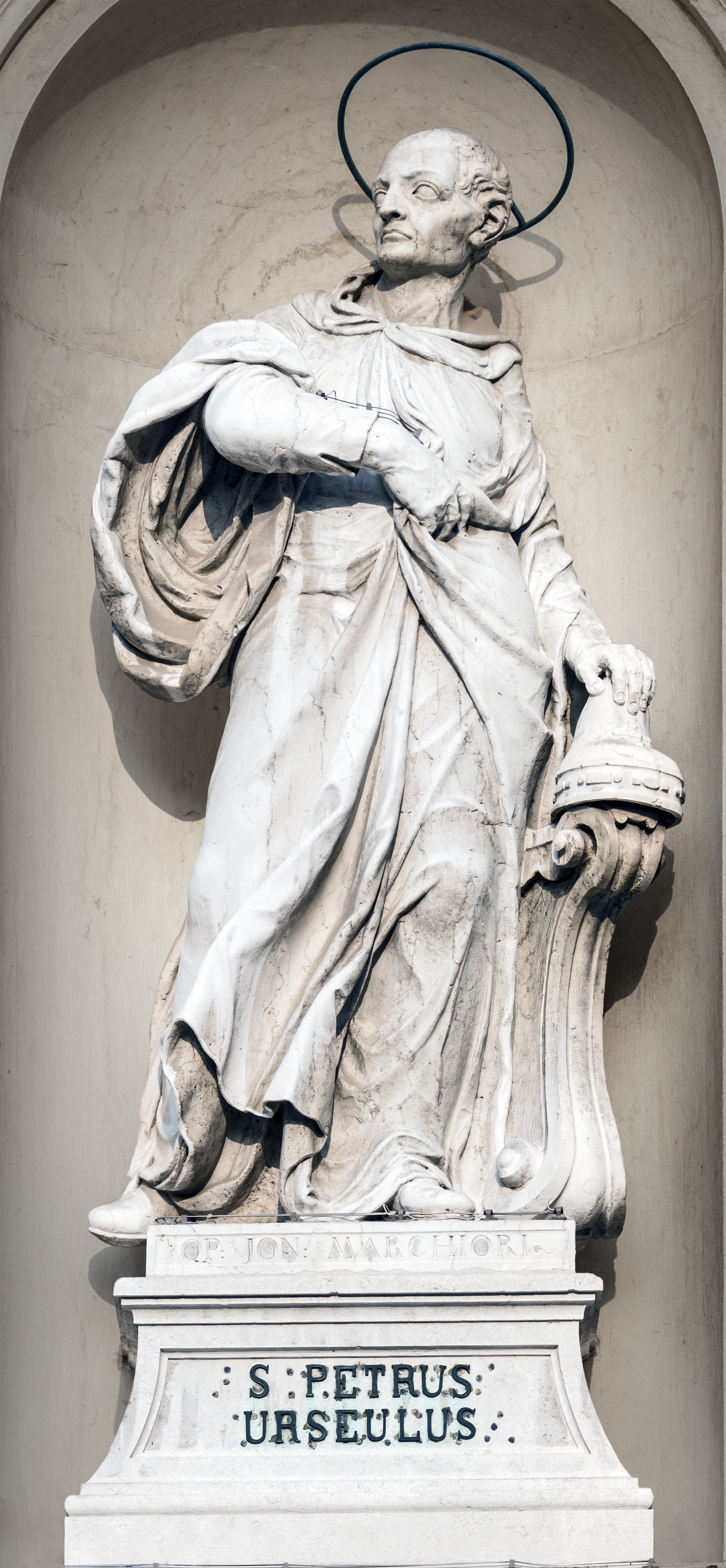
Saint Pietro Orseolo

=== Interior ===
The church interior is notable for its Tintoretto paintings including:

- Annunciation and St Roch presented to the Pope on west wall.
- St. Roch taken to Prison (attributed) and The Pool of Bethesda on south wall of the nave.
- St. Roch curing the plague victims, St. Roch comforted by an Angel, St. Roch in Solitude and St. Roch healing the Animals (attributed) in chancel.
- St. Christopher and St Martin on Horseback by Pordenone hang on north wall of the nave.

Also present are a monument to Pellegrino Baselli Grillo (1517) and a statue of St. Roch by Bartolomeo Bon.

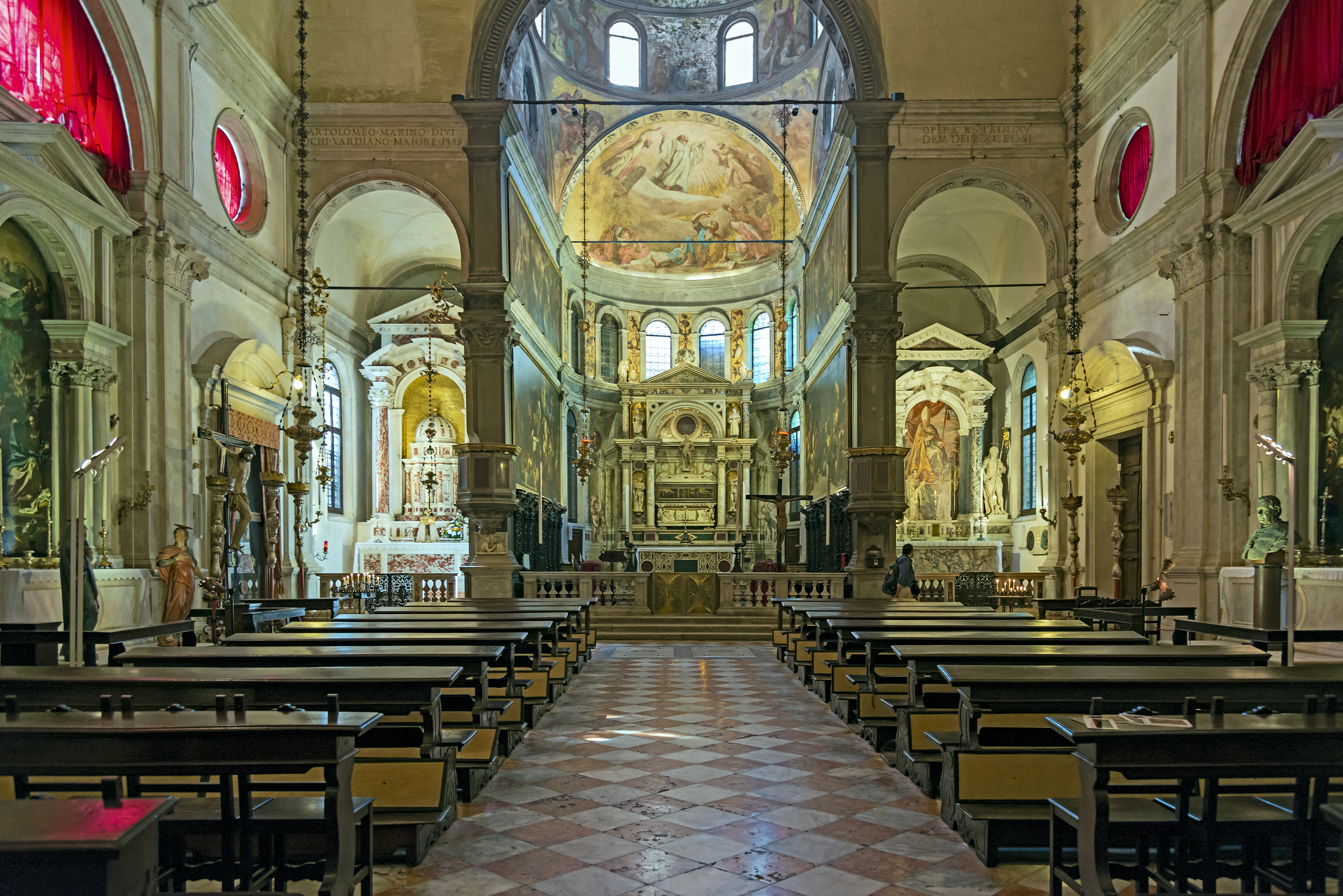
Interno

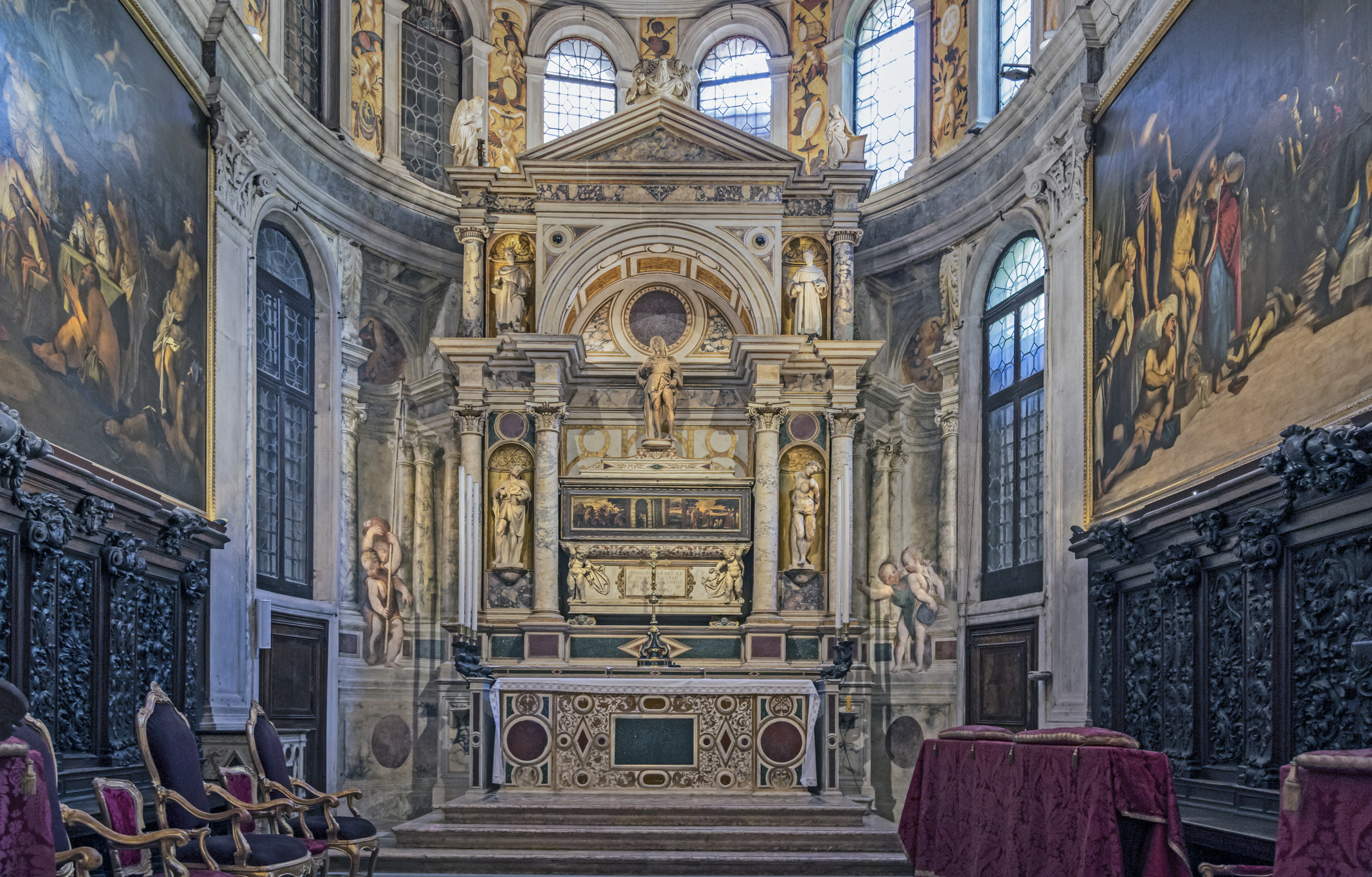
Altar by Venturino Fantoni

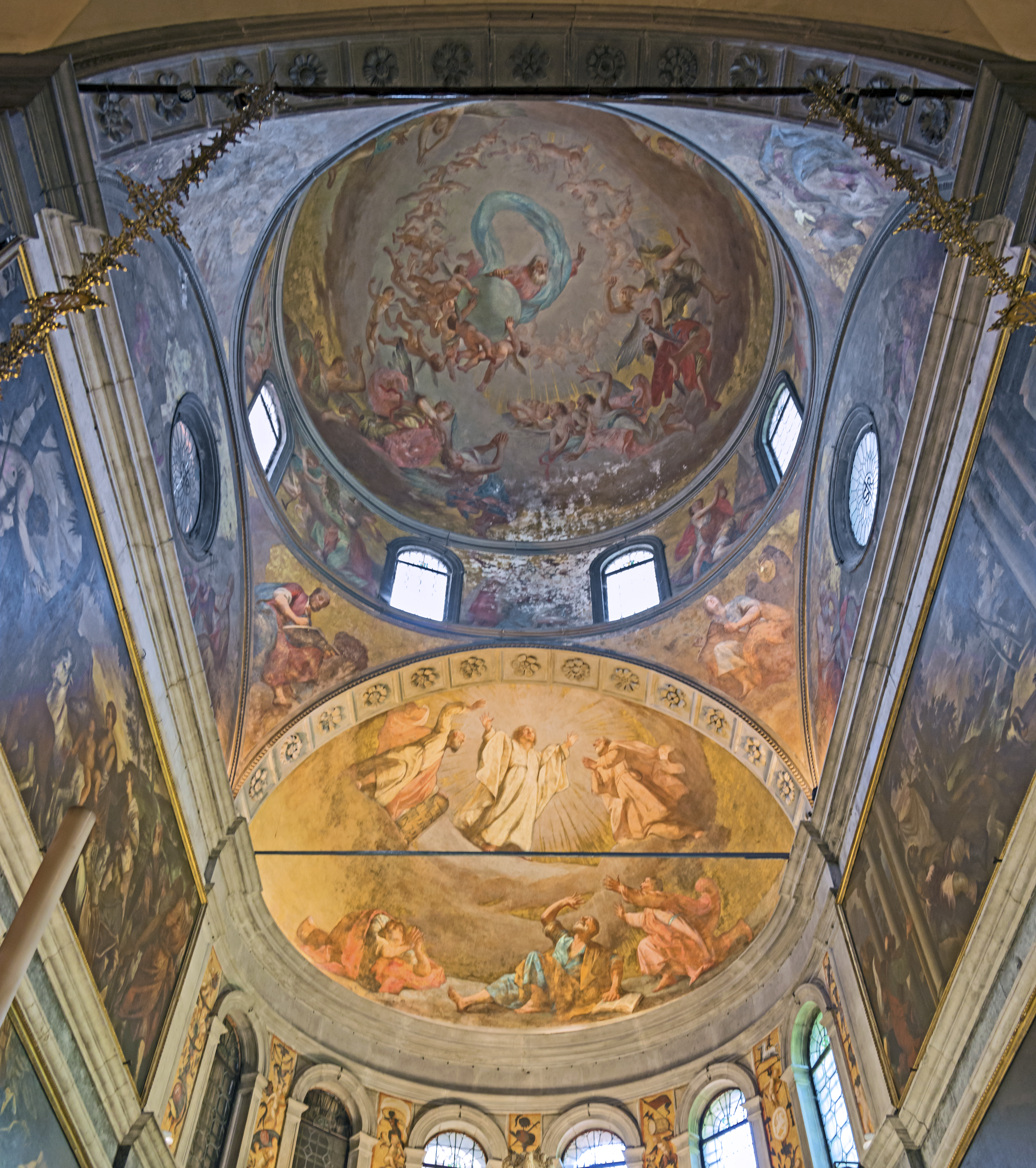
Dome and the apse were decorated by Il Pordenone

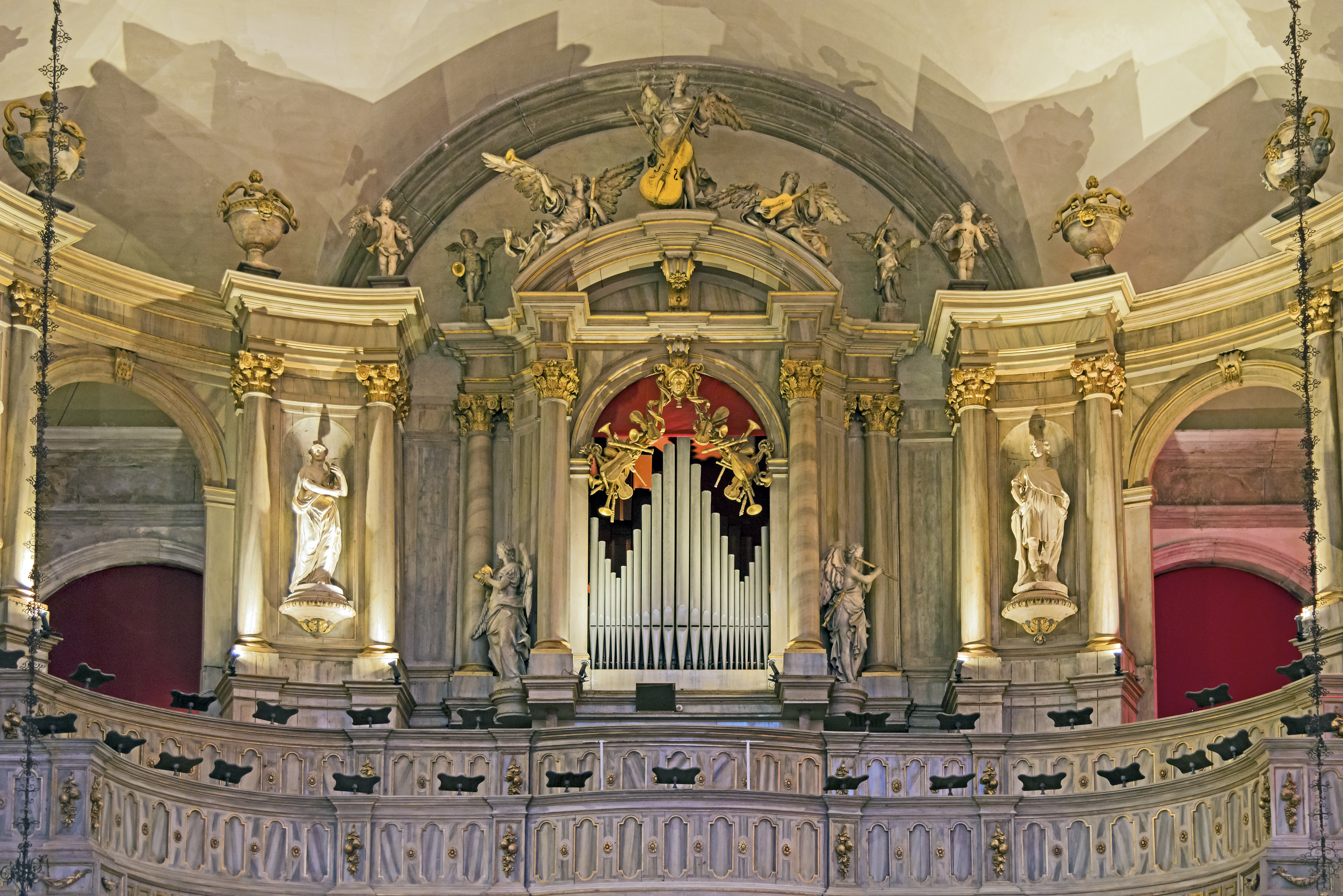
Organ

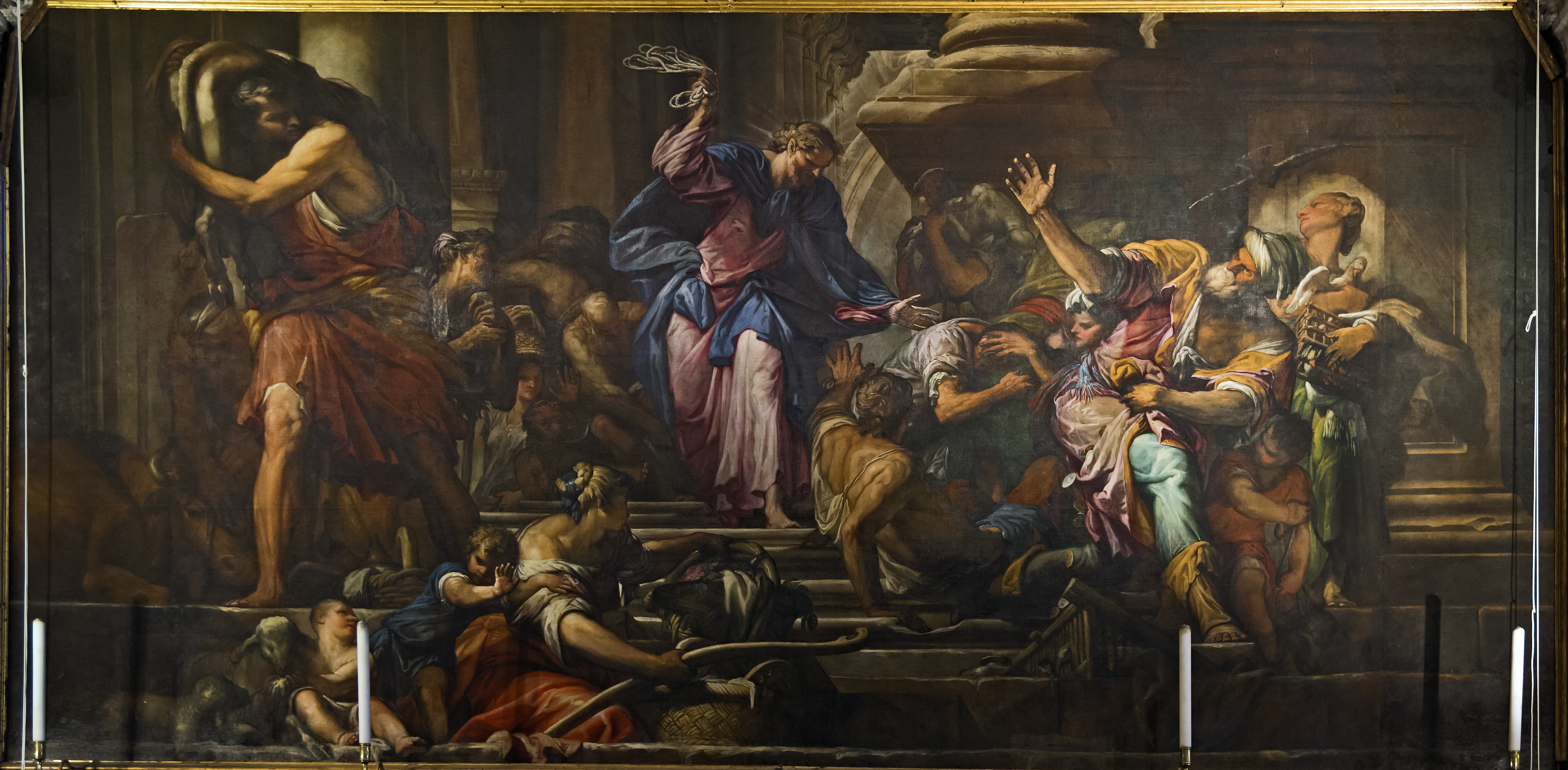
Christ expels the merchants from the temple" of Fumianidi

== See also ==
- List of churches in Venice
