= Ivo Krstelj =

Croatian and Yugoslavian politician

- Born: 6 November 1867; Kućište, Dalmatia, Austria-Hungary (now Croatia)
- Died: 22 December 1949 (aged 82); Kućište, Yugoslavia (now Croatia)
- Education: University of Vienna
- Occupations: Politician, lawyer
- Political party: Party of Rights; Democratic Party

Ivo Krstelj, also Ivan Krstelj (6 November 1867 – 22 December 1949) was a Croatian and Yugoslavian politician and lawyer.

== Biography ==
Krstelj graduated law and obtained doctoral degree from the University of Vienna in 1894. Subsequently, Krstelj pursued the career of an attorney in Zadar and Šibenik. He was a member of the Party of Rights and its Zadar regional committee secretary since 1897. Krstelj left the party, together with Mate Drinković, in protest against its proposed merger with the People's Party in 1905. He became the municipal mayor in Šibenik in 1906–1913. In 1910 and 1911, Krstelj was elected to the leadership of the Party of Rights in Dalmatia and to the leadership of the unified Party of Rights (in Croatia-Slavonia and Dalmatia respectively. In 1913, he left the Party of Rights again as he deemed the approach applied by the Party of Right to solution of the Croatian question wrong.

Krstelj and Drinković both advocated resolving the issue by having Croatia-Slavonia and Dalmatia breaking away from Austria-Hungary. As a politician favouring Yugoslavism, Krstelj was arrested after the outbreak of the World War I. By the end of the war, Krstelj became a member of the National Council of Slovenes, Croats and Serbs—the body established with the aim of political unification of the South Slavs. In the organisation, Krstelj advocated speedy unification of South Slavic lands formerly part of Austria-Hungary (including Croatia-Slavonia and Dalmatia) with the Kingdom of Serbia to prevent occupation of the eastern coast of the Adriatic Sea, i.e. Dalmatian coast, by the forces of the Kingdom of Italy enforcing provisions of the Treaty of London.

Following the end of World War I and the dissolution of Austria-Hungary, the National Council of Slovenes, Croats and Serbs appointed Krstelj a member of the three-member provincial government of the former Austro-Hungarian crown land of Dalmatia, along with Josip Smodlaka and Vjekoslav Škarica (with deputies Prvislav Grisogono, Uroš Desnica, and Jerko Machiedo). The provincial government administered the region in the run-up to the arrival of Allies of World War I and their occupation of the eastern Adriatic in 1918.

Krstelj was elected a member of the Constitutional Assembly of the newly established Kingdom of Serbs, Croats and Slovenes on the Democratic Party ticket in the 1920 parliamentary elections. Krstelj held leading offices in the Democratic Party until 1927 and he was a government minister of religion in 1921–1922.
