= Vladan Desnica =

Yugoslav writer and translator

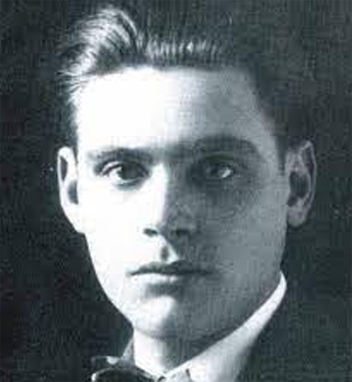
- Born: 17 September 1905; Zadar, Kingdom of Dalmatia, Austria-Hungary
- Died: 4 March 1967 (aged 61); Zagreb, SR Croatia, SFR Yugoslavia
- Resting place: Saint George Serbian Orthodox Church, Islam Grčki, Croatia
- Occupations: Novelist, short story writer, poet, playwright, screenwriter, essayist, translator
- Relatives: Uroš Desnica (father); Fani Luković (mother); Uroš Desnica (son)
- Writing career
- Language: Serbo-Croatian
- Subjects: Dalmatian people, Serbs of Croatia

Vladan Desnica (Serbian Cyrillic: Владан Десница; 17 September 1905 – 4 March 1967) was a Yugoslav writer and translator.

== Life ==
He was born in Zadar, Austria-Hungary to Uroš Desnica (von Desnica), a politician from the noble Orthodox Serbian family from Obrovac and Islam Grčki, descendant of Stojan Janković, and his mother Fani Desnica was from a Catholic family Luković from Prčanj near Kotor in what is today Montenegro.

He wrote poems, short stories, science fiction and novels, usually dealing with life in cities and villages of northern Dalmatia. His best work is the novel Proljeća Ivana Galeba (The Springs of Ivan Galeb), published in 1957, in which he gives a first-person account of an intellectual lying in a hospital bed and meditating about illness and mortality. He died in Zagreb.

Like many writers who used to work in Yugoslavia, he is claimed both by Croatian and Serbian literature.

His talents were also used for the medium of film. In 1954 he wrote the script for Koncert, one of the most important titles in the history of Yugoslav cinema.

Vladan Desnica is buried in the Serbian Orthodox Church of Saint George, next to the castle of Stojan Janković in Islam Grčki. The church was destroyed by Croatian paramilitaries in Operation Maslenica in January 1993, during which Desnica's gravestone was damaged.

== Selected works ==
- Zimsko ljetovanje, 1950.
- Olupine na suncu, 1953.
- Tu, odmah pored nas, 1956.
- Slijepac na žalu, 1956.
- Proljeća Ivana Galeba, 1957.
- Fratar sa zelenom bradom, 1969.
- Efemernost filma, article, 1973.
- Progutane polemike, 2001.
- Ljestve Jakovljeve
- O pojmovima tipičnog i njihovoj neshodnosti na području estetike

== See also ==
- Ognjeslav Utješenović
- Petar Preradović
- August Harambašić
