= Vjekoslav Škarica =

Croatian and Yugoslavian lawyer and politician

- Born: 24 December 1863; Kaštel Stari, Dalmatia, Austrian Empire (now Croatia)
- Died: 13 January 1945 (aged 81); Split, Federated State of Croatia, Yugoslavia (now Croatia)
- Occupation(s): Politician, lawyer

Vjekoslav Škarica (24 December 1863 – 13 January 1945) was a Croatian and Yugoslavian politician and lawyer. He specialised in the maritime law.

Following the end of World War I and the dissolution of Austria-Hungary, the National Council of Slovenes, Croats and Serbs appointed Škarica a member of the three-member provincial government of the former Austro-Hungarian crown land of Dalmatia, along with Ivo Krstelj and Josip Smodlaka (with deputies Prvislav Grisogono, Uroš Desnica, and Jerko Machiedo). The provincial government administered the region in the run-up to the arrival of Allies of World War I and their occupation of the eastern Adriatic in 1918.

In 1919, Škarica drew up, on his own initiative a proposal for the Maritime Act of the newly established Kingdom of Serbs, Croats and Slovenes (later renamed Yugoslavia). He was appointed a member of a committee of experts tasked with drawing up the Yugoslav Maritime Act in 1937. Some sources credit Škarica with the introduction of the Croatian legal term brodar, meaning the ship operator.

== Sources ==
- Cukrov, Mladen (2013). "Admiral Philip Andrews u Splitu" [Allied Peacekeeping Mission in Split After the First World War and the Role of the U.S. Admiral Philip Andrews]. Kulturna baština (in Croatian). 39 (1). Split: Društvo prijatelja kulturne baštine: 97–112. ISSN 0351-0557.
- Vuković, Ante (2019). "Splićanin dr. Vjekoslav Škarica: autor osebujnog pojma pomorskog prava "brodar"" [Dr. Vjekoslav Škarica: Native of Split and the Author of an Idiosyncratic term in Maritime Law – Brodar (Eng. Ship's Operator)]. Kulturna baština (in Croatian) (45). Split: Društvo prijatelja kulturne baštine: 197–210. ISSN 0351-0557.
