= Ivan Visin =

Naval capitan

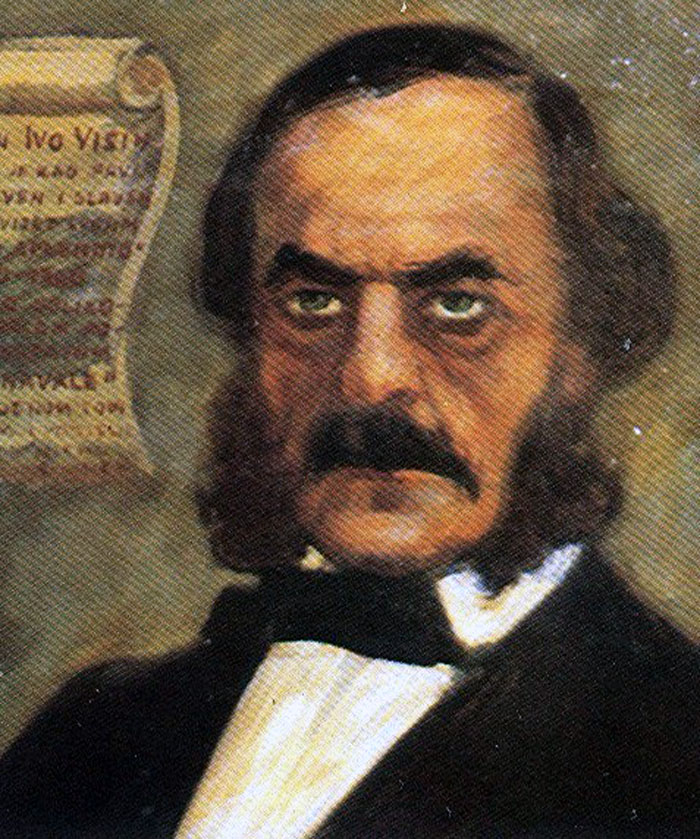
- Born: 3 November 1806; Prčanj, Illyrian Provinces, French Empire
- Died: 17 August 1868 (aged 61); Prčanj, Kingdom of Dalmatia, Austria-Hungary, Bay of Kotor
- Occupation: Naval captain

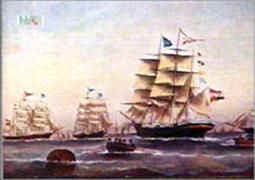
Splendido

Ivan "Ivo" Visin (3 November 1806 – 17 August 1868) was a naval captain of the Austrian Navy and an explorer.

== Biography ==
Visin was born in Prčanj, then under the occupation of the French Empire. At the request of the government of the Habsburg monarchy, he became the first person from area of Yugoslavia to circumnavigate the globe in a vessel called Splendido between 1852 and 1859. The journey started in Antwerp and ended successfully in Trieste. The ship was 30 m long with 311 tonnes of cargo. For this undertaking of historical importance for the empire, he had been decorated with a flag of honour Merito navali by the Austrian Emperor Franz Josef. The trophy is on display in Birth of Our Lady church in Prčanj. Later, Visin became an honorary citizen of Trieste.
