= Josip Smodlaka =

Austrian, Yugoslav and Croatian politician

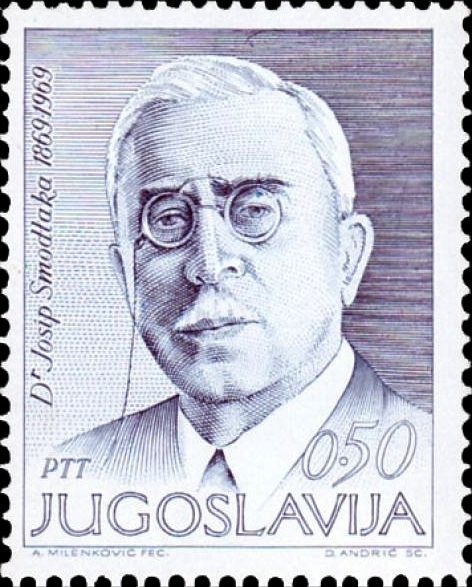

Member of the Imperial Council for the XI. Electoral District in the Kingdom of Dalmatia - Split
- In office 1910–1918
- Preceded by: Frane Bulić
- Succeeded by: Office abolished

Mayor of Split
- In office 28 October 1918 – 2 November 1918
- Preceded by: Teodor Šporn
- Succeeded by: Ivo Tartaglia
- In office 12 September 1943 – October 1943
- Preceded by: Ivo Tijardović
- Succeeded by: Petar Vitezica

Personal details
- Born: 9 November 1869 Imotski, Dalmatia, Austria-Hungary
- Died: 31 May 1956 (aged 86) Split, PR Croatia, FPR Yugoslavia
- Party: Croatian Democratic Party; National Liberation Front (JNOF)

Josip Smodlaka (pronounced [jǒsip smǒdlaka]; 9 November 1869 – 31 May 1956) was an Austrian, Yugoslav and Croatian politician who served two brief terms as Mayor of Split.

Following the end of World War I and the dissolution of Austria-Hungary, the National Council of Slovenes, Croats and Serbs appointed Smodlaka a member of the three-member provincial government of the former Austro-Hungarian crown land of Dalmatia, along with Ivo Krstelj and Vjekoslav Škarica (with deputies Prvislav Grisogono, Uroš Desnica, and Jerko Machiedo). The provincial government administered the region in the run-up to the arrival of Allies of World War I and their occupation of the eastern Adriatic in 1918.
