= Vrbanj =

- Village
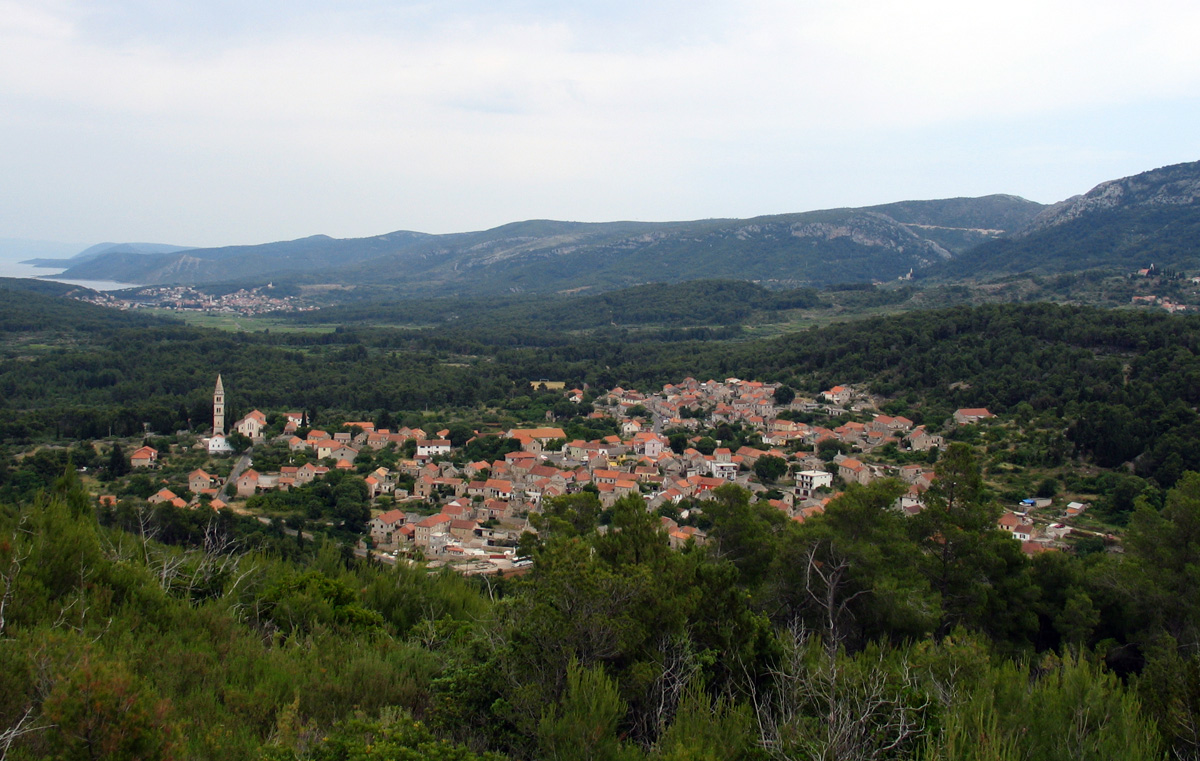

- Location within Croatia
- Country: Croatia
- County: Split-Dalmatia County
- Municipality: Stari Grad

Area
  - Total: 8.9 km^{2} (3.4 sq mi)

Population (2021)
  - Total: 458
  - Density: 51/km^{2} (130/sq mi)
- Time zone: UTC+1 (CET)
  - Summer (DST): UTC+2 (CEST)

Vrbanj is a village on the island of Hvar in Croatia. Administratively, it is part of the municipality of Stari Grad.
