= Jerko Machiedo =

Croatian politician and physician

- Born: 24 November 1877; Hvar, Dalmatia, Austria-Hungary (now Croatia)
- Died: 10 February 1962 (aged 84); Zagreb, Croatia, Yugoslavia (now Croatia)
- Education: University of Graz
- Occupations: Politician, physician
- Political party: Croatian Party; Democratic Party; Croatian Peasant Party
- Relatives: Mladen Machiedo (grandson)

Jerko Machiedo (24 November 1877 – 10 February 1962) was a Croatian and politician and physician.

== Biography ==
=== Early life and family ===
Machiedo studied medicine at the University of Graz. He earned his doctoral degree there in 1901. Following military service in Zadar and further training at a clinic in Graz, Machiedo was first employed as the substitute town physician in Ston in early 1902. Later that year, he was hired as the municipal physician in his hometown of Hvar. Machiedo retained that position until 1909. In 1907, he was elected the deputy president of the Chamber of Physicians of Dalmatia. He married Tereza Pinkava and they had sons Dušan and Dimitrije, and daughter Milica. Dimitrije's son Mladen became a member of the Croatian Academy of Sciences and Arts in 2014.

=== Career until World War I ===
In 1908, Machiedo was elected a representative in the Diet of Dalmatia on the ticket of the Croatian Party (a party created through merger of the People's Party and the Party of Rights. In 1910, he was appointed the deputy president of the provincial government of the Austro-Hungarian crown land of Dalmatia in Zadar. At the same time, he started working in the Zadar hospital.

Following the assassination of Archduke Franz Ferdinand in Sarajevo in 1914, Machiedo was arrested on political grounds and held in custody pending trial in the Mamula Fortress and in Herceg Novi. He was acquitted and conscripted as a military physician, in service during the World War I, until early 1918. Then he returned to Zadar and his post in the provincial government. Following the end of the war and the dissolution of Austria-Hungary, the National Council of Slovenes, Croats and Serbs appointed Machiedo a deputy member of the three-member provincial government of the former Austro-Hungarian crown land of Dalmatia. The government consisted of Ivo Krstelj, Vjekoslav Škarica, and Josip Smodlaka (with deputies Prvislav Grisogono, Uroš Desnica, and Machiedo). The provincial government administered the region in the run-up to the arrival of Allies of World War I and their occupation of the eastern Adriatic in 1918. Following arrival of Italian troops to Zadar, Machiedo was placed under house arrest. In early 1919, he was exiled by the Italian authorities to the island of Sardinia and then to the area of Ancona before being returned to Zadar. After the city of Zadar was awarded to Italy under the Treaty of Rapallo, Machiedo left Zadar and moved to nearby Šibenik, then in the newly established Kingdom of Serbs, Croats and Slovenes (later renamed Yugoslavia).

=== Interwar period and retirement ===
In the interwar period, Machiedo took employment in the Šibenik hospital. He worked there at various posts, including as the hospital director, from 1922 until retirement in 1941. In that period, he also pursued politics as a member of the Democratic Party. Following the 1928 assassination in the Assembly of Yugoslavia when the leader of the Croatian Peasant Party (HSS) Stjepan Radić was fatally shot and the introduction of the dictatorship in Yugoslavia in 1929, Machiedo switched allegiance to the HSS. In 1931, after assassination of king Alexander I of Yugoslavia in Marseille, Machiedo was questioned by the authorities due to his remarks on the assassination and briefly transferred to work in Knin hospital.

Despite formal retirement, Machiedo kept working in his family home in Hvar as one of only two physicians left on the island of Hvar during the World War II. In that period, Machiedo provided free medical treatment to wounded Yugoslav Partisans. As the sole physician in his native town, he kept his practice open until 1952, when a municipal medical centre opened. Even then, the medical centre borrowed Machiedo's X-ray machine as the only one available to them until 1955.

== Sources ==
- Cukrov, Mladen (2013). "Admiral Philip Andrews u Splitu" [Allied Peacekeeping Mission in Split After the First World War and the Role of the U.S. Admiral Philip Andrews]. Kulturna baština (in Croatian). 39 (1). Split: Društvo prijatelja kulturne baštine: 97–112. ISSN 0351-0557.
- Kovačić, Joško (2014). "Rod Machiedo sa Hvara" [The Machiedo Family from the Island of Hvar]. Prilozi povijesti otoka Hvara (in Croatian). XII (1). Hvar: Muzej hvarske baštine: 225–248. ISSN 0353-0957.
- Poljak, Željko, ed. (2005). Hrvatska liječnička komora 1903.–1995.–2005 [Croatian Chamber of Physicians 1903–1995–2005] (in Croatian). Zagreb: Croatian Chamber of Physicians. OCLC 165859877.
