= Prvislav Grisogono =

Croatian and Yugoslavian politician

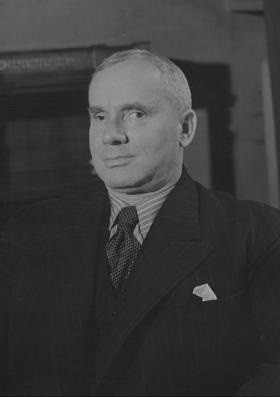
- Born: 31 March 1879; Split, Kingdom of Dalmatia, Austria-Hungary
- Died: 7 December 1969 (aged 90); Paris, France
- Occupations: Lawyer, politician
- Political party: Democratic Party (1919–1924); Independent Democratic Party (1924–1929); Yugoslav National Party (from 1929)
- Relatives: Ivo Grisogono (brother)

Prvislav Grisogono (31 March 1879 – 7 December 1969) was a Croatian and Yugoslavian lawyer and politician.

== Biography ==
=== Early years ===
Grisogono studied law at the University of Vienna and received his doctoral degree in law from the University of Graz. During his university education, Grisogono started to support the political opposition to the rule of the House of Habsburg-Lorraine. After completion of the law school, Grisogono worked as a trainee lawyer in Split and then opened law firms in Imotski and then in Sinj. In this period, Grisogono co-founded Sloboda (lit. Freedom), and contributed to Savremenik (lit. Contemporary) and Novi list newspapers. He also established a connection with the Young Bosnia organisation. Upon outbreak of World War I, authorities in Austria-Hungary interned Grisogono together with his brother Ivo, and writers Ante Tresić Pavičić and Niko Bartulović in Maribor and then in Zadar until his release in 1917.

=== Government minister ===
After the release, Grisogono resumed his legal practice. In 1918, he became a member of the National Council of Slovenes, Croats and Serbs. The National Council appointed Grisogono a deputy member of the three-member provincial government of the former Austro-Hungarian crown land of Dalmatia. The government consisted of Ivo Krstelj, Josip Smodlaka, and Vjekoslav Škarica, while Grisogono, Uroš Desnica, and Jerko Machiedo were appointed their deputies. The provincial government administered the region in the run-up to the arrival of Allies of World War I and their occupation of the eastern Adriatic in 1918. In 1919, Grisogono joined a secret committee tasked with establishing covert military and political forces tasked with ending the Italian rule in parts of Dalmatia. The committee was disbanded when the Treaty of Rapallo was signed in 1920.

In 1919, Grisogono took part in founding of the Democratic Party of the newly-established union-state of the South Slavs, the Kingdom of Serbs, Croats and Slovenes (later renamed Yugoslavia). He went on to serve as a secretary of its Provisional Committee. The party soon splintered and Grisogono joined one of the Democratic Party factions, the Independent Democratic Party (SDS) led by Svetozar Pribićević. Grisogono became a member of the governing board of the SDS and, through the allegiance, a member of governments of Nikola Pašić and Pribićević in 1924 and 1925 fulfilling the roles of the justice minister, minister of trade, and a minister without portfolio.

=== Split with Pribićević ===
In 1927, when the SDS formed a coalition with the Croatian Peasant Party (HSS), SDS leader Pribićević changed his political position from integral to federalist Yugoslavism, diverging from Grisogono's views. The split was widened by the introduction of the 6 January Dictatorship when Grisogono supported the dictatorial rule by King Alexander I and the king appointed Grisogono a member of the Royal Legislative Council as a member of the newly formed Yugoslav National Party. In 1932, Grisogono was appointed the ambassador to Czechoslovakia. He was transferred to the ambassadorial post to Poland in 1936, but recalled two years later when he came in conflict with the Prime Minister Milan Stojadinović over Grisogono's support to the Little Entente contrary to the prime minister's views.

=== World War II ===
In 1938, Grisogono resumed his legal practice in Belgrade after a fourteen-year hiatus. After the Invasion of Yugoslavia in World War II, and occupation of the country, parts of Yugoslavia were annexed by neighbouring countries and a portion was organised as Fascist puppet state of the Independent State of Croatia (NDH) governed by the Ustaše. Two principal guerilla forces were the Communist-dominated Yugoslav Partisans and the Chetniks whose initial allegiance to the Yugoslav government-in-exile in London gradually gave way to collaboration with the Axis powers. Grisogono remained in Belgrade, sending letters to the government-in-exile informing them of the developments. Grisogono was arrested and imprisoned in late 1941 and early 1942, possibly on charges of being a freemason, or a British agent.

During the war, there was an alleged meeting of a representative of Chetnik leader Draža Mihailović and two representatives of the leader of the HSS Vladko Maček possibly in March 1942. The purported purpose of the meeting was to ensure that Maček does what he can to prevent atrocities against Serbs in exchange for Mihailović's assurance of no reprisals against Croats. According to Grisogono's law firm associate Vlastimir Stojanović, this meeting took place in Grisogono's law office in Belgrade, but Stojanović did not reveal names of participants in the meeting other than Grisogono and himself. (Maček was interned in the NDH for the duration of the war.)

After the war, in 1949, Grisogono emigrated to Paris and occasionally published political commentaries in Serbian emigré journals and on radio.

== Forged letter to Stepinac ==
During World War II, a letter alleged to have been written by Grisogono to Archbishop of Zagreb Aloysius Stepinac emerged. The letter was written in early 1942 amid numerous rumours (some factual, others fabricated) of atrocities committed in the context of genocide of Serbs in the NDH. The purpose of the letter and its attribution to Grisogono was to make the rumours more credible since they were alleged to have come from a reputable public figure of Croat descent. The contents of the letter represented a list of many such atrocity rumours circulating in Belgrade at the time and accused the Catholic Church of complicity in the atrocities.

According to Grisogono's law firm associate Vlastimir Stojanović, Grisogono quickly learned of the forgery and dictated him a letter to Stepinac denying authorship of the letter falsely attributed to Grisogono. While condemning Ustaše crimes and passivity of individuals within the Catholic Church, Grisogono was outraged that his reputation was used to assign collective responsibility and spread hatred between Croats and Serbs. According to Stojanović, he learned from his fellow lawyer Radoje Vukčević that the forgery was dictated by lawyer Adam Pribićević (brother of Svetozar Pribićević and Vukčević's wife's uncle) in Vukčević's law office in Belgrade. It is likely that the forgery was distributed by the collaborationist government of the Territory of the Military Commander in Serbia. Grisogono denied his authorship of the letter in an article published by Time and Tide in 1953 once again, but the forgery was touted as authentic in Yugoslavia regardless. Grisogono's denial of authorship was suppressed from public knowledge in Yugoslavia until 1985.

The issue of the forged letter attributed to Grisogono was revived in 1988 by Serbian historian Dragoljub Živojinović and publicist and conspiracy theorist Dejan Lučić who presented it as genuine. Živojinović published this position in his 1988 book Varvarstvo u ime Hristovo (lit. Barbarism in the Name of Christ) and the book was presented as indisputable truth in 1989 by NIN magazine.

== Sources ==
- Boban, Ljubo (1988). "Još jednom o navodnom pismu P. Grisogona A. Stepincu 1942. godine" [Once More on the Alleged Letter of P. Grisogono to A. Stepinac of 1942]. Časopis za suvremenu povijest (in Croatian). 20 (1–2). Zagreb: Croatian Institute of History: 215–225. ISSN 0590-9597.
- Cukrov, Mladen (2013). "Admiral Philip Andrews u Splitu" [Allied Peacekeeping Mission in Split After the First World War and the Role of the U.S. Admiral Philip Andrews]. Kulturna baština (in Croatian). 39 (1). Split: Društvo prijatelja kulturne baštine: 97–112. ISSN 0351-0557.
- Byford, Jovan (2020). Picturing Genocide in the Independent State of Croatia: Atrocity Images and the Contested Memory of the Second World War in the Balkans. London: Bloomsbury Publishing. ISBN 9781350015982.
- Maček, Vladko (1957). "XVI: Prison Again". In the Struggle for Freedom. University Park and London: The Pennsylvania State University Press. ISBN 978-0-271-06665-3.
- Švab, Mladen (2002). "Grisogono, Prvislav". Croatian Biographical Lexicon (in Croatian). Zagreb: Miroslav Krleža Institute of Lexicography.
