= Guido Keller =

İtalian aviator (1892–1929)

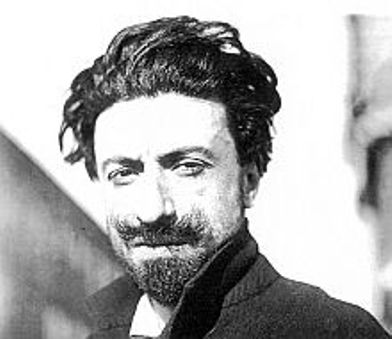
Guido Keller

Guido Keller (6 February 1892 – 9 November 1929) was an Italian aviator and political activist who was closely associated with Gabriele D’Annunzio and played an important role in the seizure of Fiume in 1919.

== Early life ==
Guido Keller was born in Milan on 6 February 1892 into a family of the local aristocracy with Swiss origins. As a teenager, he attended the Swiss college of Trotzen, but was expelled for his lack of discipline.

== First World War ==
The outbreak of the First World War saw him serve as a lieutenant in the Royal Italian Army. Attracted by flying, he obtained his pilot's licence at the civilian flying club at the Torino-Mirafiori airfield. After further practice he was assigned the rank of lieutenant in the Corpo Aeronautico Militare on 1 December 1915, flying Aviatik B.I aircraft from the Verona-Tombetta airfield, as part of the Squadriglia caccia which became, from 15 April 1916 the Squadriglia.

During a night flight over Desenzano he was mistakenly attacked by an Italian seaplane-fighter, which he was only able to disengage from through a series of difficult manoeuvres. On landing he claimed that the damage to his plane had been caused by enemy aircraft, so as to cover up the mistake of his Italian fellow-aviator. In 1916, he was licensed to fly Nieuport-Macchi Ni-10 and Nieuport Ni-11 fighters, built under licence by Macchi di Varese. In February 1917, he was assigned to the Squadriglia caccia. Here, he challenged an Austro-Hungarian pilot to a weaponless single combat, in which the winner would be the pilot who succeeded in taking his opponent's tail. Keller won the challenge, after which his plane was accompanied back to the Italian lines by an escort of Austro-Hungarian aircraft.

On 1 November that year, he transferred to the Squadriglia aeroplani da caccia commanded by Francesco Baracca. When Baracca did not return from the action which saw him shot down over Montello, Keller undertook a reconnaissance mission flying over the enemy front line several times searching vainly for his commander. He was one of the pallbearers at Baracca's funeral.

Shortly before the end of the war, he undertook a strafing mission against enemy troops near Godega di Sant'Urbano. His plane was repeatedly hit by enemy fire and he received serious injuries to his leg. Forced to land, he was taken prisoner and sent first to the hospital at Godega, and later to the military hospital in Sacile. He was liberated by Italian troops following the battle of Vittorio Veneto.

== Seizure of Fiume ==
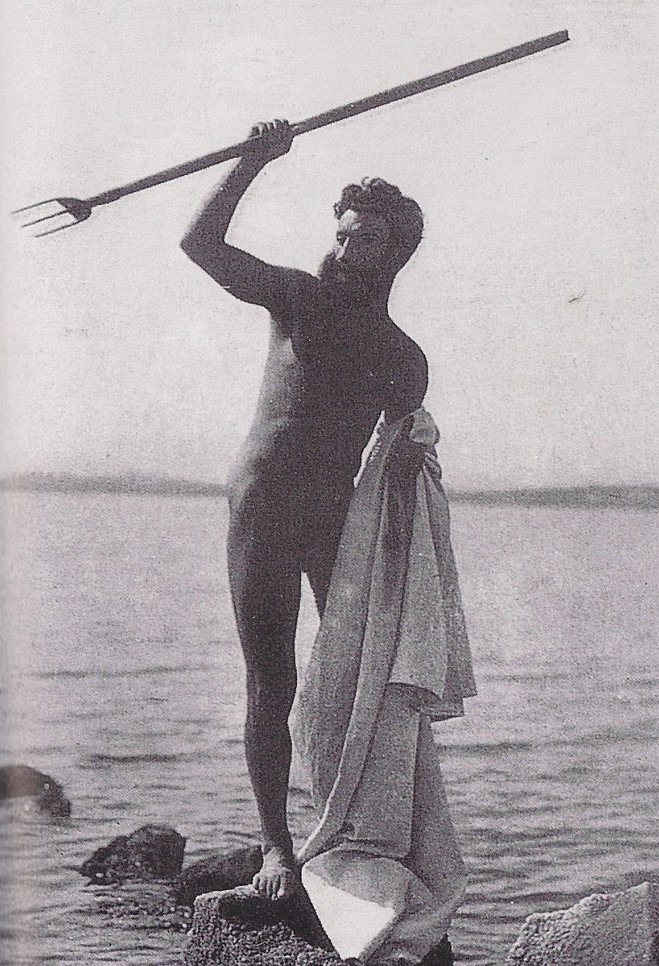
Guido Keller posing as Neptune

On 12 September 1919 a column of around a thousand irregular troops commanded by Gabriele D’Annunzio marched into Fiume, whose annexation to Italy was opposed by US President Woodrow Wilson. This adventure was the beginning of the Regency of Carnaro, and D’Annunzio named Keller “Secretary for Action” and head of the “Ufficio Colpi di Mano”, commonly known as the “Uscocchi”. These units were named after medieval privateers of the Adriatic, the Uskoks, and their role was to secure the weapons and supplies needed by D’Annunzio's regime, resorting in many cases to outright piracy.

Keller was responsible for acts of piracy and theft, such as the occasion when he stole a pig and loaded it onto his plane. The animal was so heavy that it broke through the bottom of his fuselage and he landed with its legs sticking out. Keller carried a tea set with biscuits on his plane, contributing to his reputation as a refined dandy.

As a protest against the signing of the Treaty of Rapallo, he flew over Rome in an Ansaldo SVA biplane to drop bouquets of flowers on the Vatican and Quirinale hills, as a gesture of homage, as well as an enamelled chamber-pot with a bunch of carrots and turnips on Palazzo Montecitorio, seat of the Chamber of Deputies, as a gesture of contempt, with a message attached that read “To the parliament and government based on lies and fear, the allegorical embodiment of their value.” During the return flight, bad weather forced him to land, and when peasants came to his assistance, he discovered that he had inadvertently landed in the Republic of San Marino. Welcomed by the authorities there, he improvised a message from D’Annunzio to the Italian government before securing diplomatic credentials from the republic that allowed him to return freely to Fiume, bypassing the blockade imposed by the Italian army.

Keller was the only one of D’Annunzio's companions permitted to address him using the familiar personal pronoun ‘tu’. While in Fiume he also became a friend of Filippo Tommaso Marinetti who introduced him to futurism, which interested him for a time before he became disillusioned.

With his friend the writer Giovanni Comisso, Keller founded a yoga group in Fiume, which adopted the swastika as one of its symbols. The group had esoteric and naturist tendencies and Keller was often portrayed nude in photos of the time. He slept semi-nude at the top of a tree together with his pet eagle. A habitual user of cocaine, he was also a devotee of group sex, including with male partners.

== After Fiume ==
Disappointed and embittered, Keller left for Turkey, where he tried to create an airline, but his venture was not successful. Returning to Italy he joined the fascist movement, although the fascists never really trusted him because of his bitter criticisms. He took part in the March on Rome. In 1923 he returned to military flying, and was named aeronautical attaché to the Italian embassy in Berlin. He then asked to be returned to active service and was sent to Benghazi in Libya during the period when Italian forces were engaged in operations against rebel tribes. He returned to Italy before embarking on a long voyage of exploration to South America. He went up the Amazon River, visited Venezuela, and spent time in Peru as a gold prospector.

In the last years of his life, he lived in Ostia in poverty, relying on support from his few remaining friends. He was a friend of Mario de Bernardi and other aviators of the time. He died in a traffic accident at the age of thirty seven, on 9 November 1929 near Magliano Sabina, alongside Vittorio Montiglio. Following D'Annunzio's wish, he was buried on the Colle delle Arche on his estate, the Vittoriale degli Italiani in Gardone Riviera, where D’Annunzio was later buried himself.

== Honours ==
Keller was awarded the Silver Medal of Military Valor three times for his valour as a pilot during the First World War.

- On 12 June 1919, he received his first award for bravery for aerial combat between 24 April and 26 May 1917 over the Carso.
- On 1 September 1920, he received his second award for bravery in aerial combat in engagements over the Carso in September and October 1917, over Monte Franchini in November 1917 and over the Piave in May 1918.
- On 2 June 1921, he was again decorated for his bravery over the Piave in July, August and October 1918, including the engagement in which he was forced to land and taken prisoner.
