= Prčanj =

Town in Coastal, Montenegro, Kotor

Prčanj Прчањ
- Town
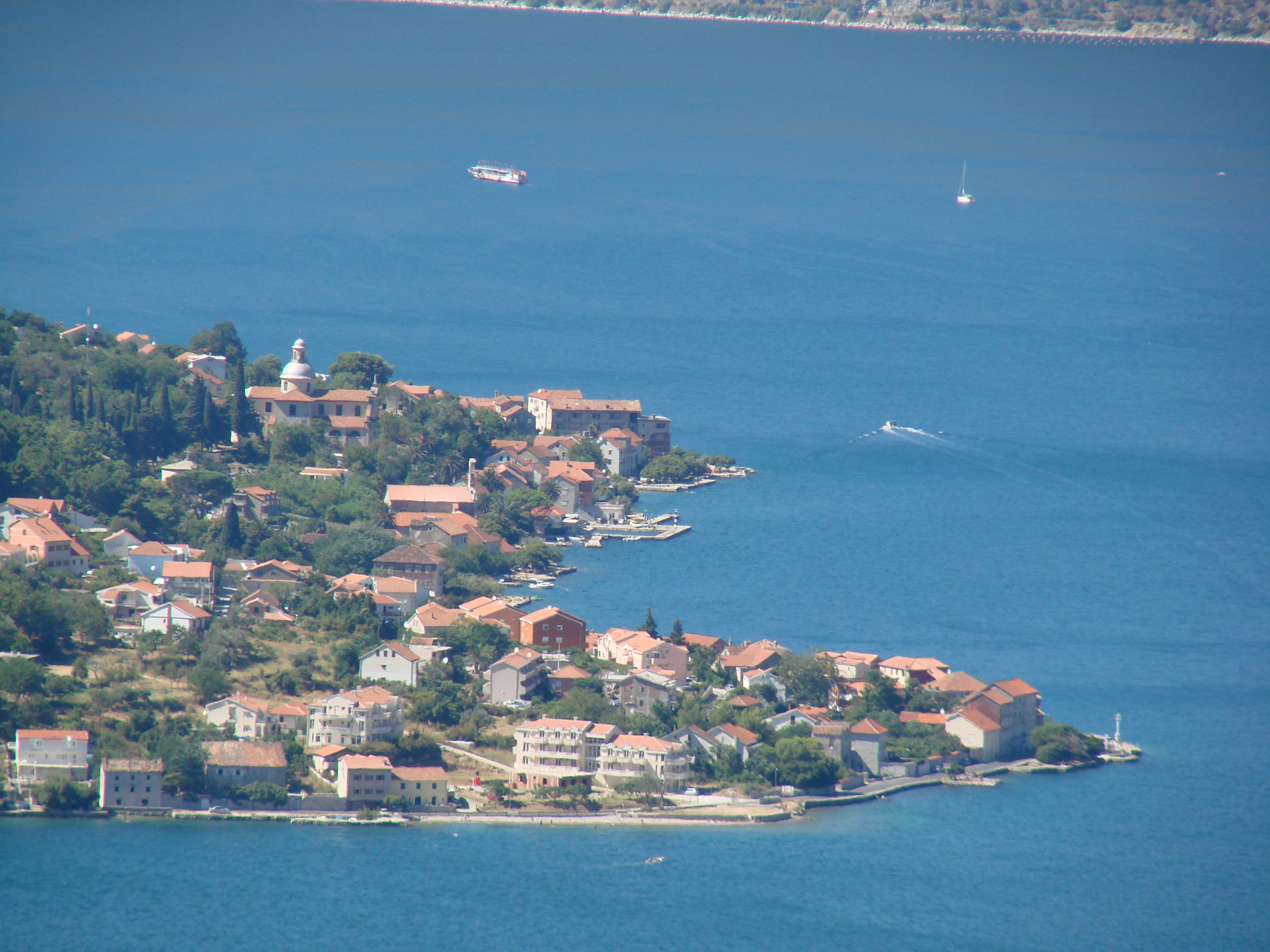
- Prčanj Town Center

- Location within Montenegro
- Coordinates: 42°27′27″N 18°44′32″E
- Country: Montenegro
- Region: Coastal
- Municipality: Kotor

Population (2011)
  - Total: 1,130
- Time zone: UTC+1 (CET)
  - Summer (DST): UTC+2 (CEST)

Prčanj (Montenegrin: Прчањ, pronounced [př̩tʃaɲ]) is a small town along the Bay of Kotor, in southwestern Montenegro. According to the 2011 census, the town has a population of 1,128 people.

It is located 5 kilometres west of Kotor, opposite to Dobrota and between the settlements of Muo and Donji Stoliv. It was one of the most important maritime centers on the southern Adriatic throughout history.

== History ==
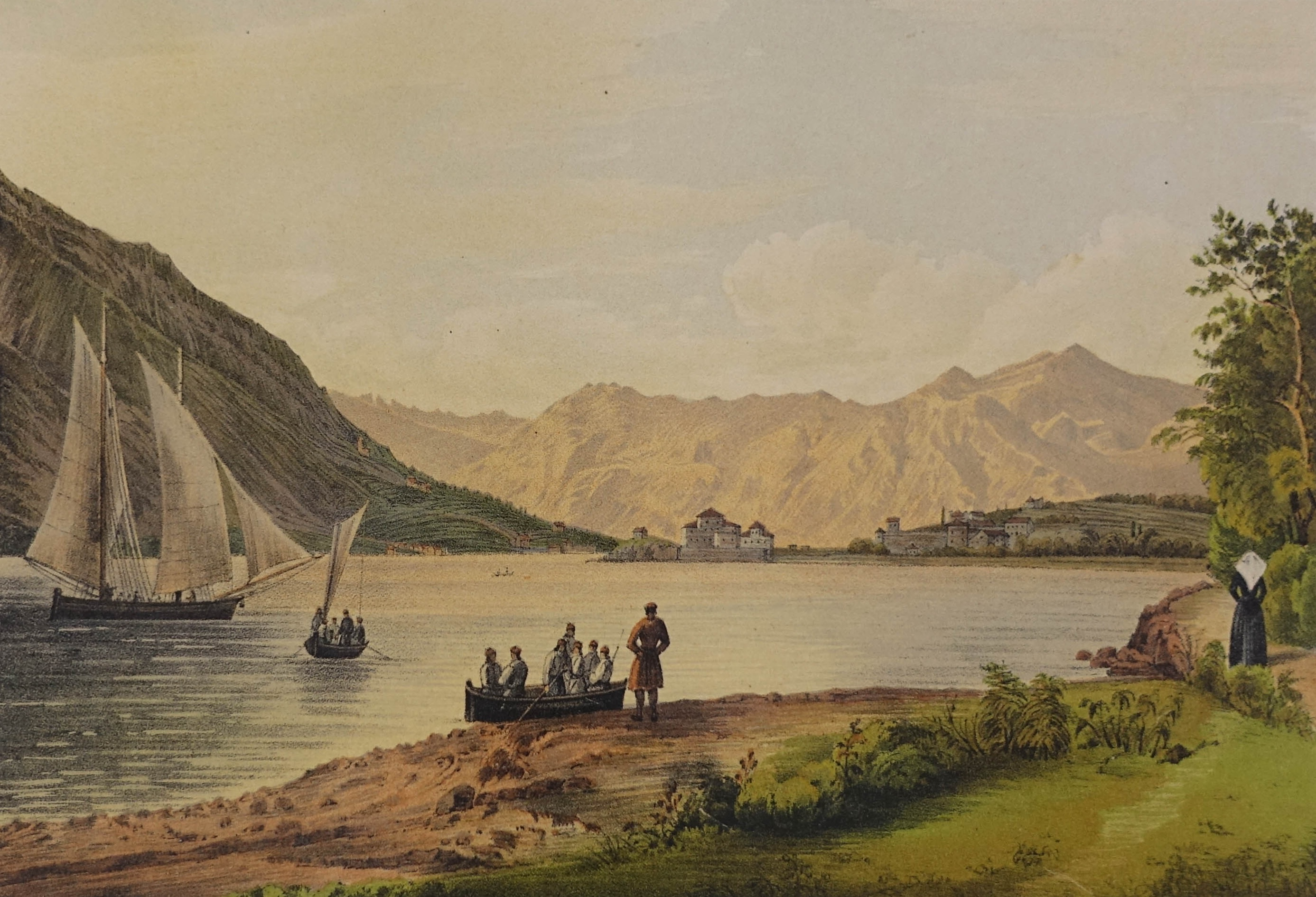
Prčanj and Dobrota in 1846

The village of Perzagno (now Prčanj) was closely related to the nearby port of Cattaro (or Kotor).

While under the rule of the Venetian Republic, Perzagno gained fame in a rather unusual way. By the end of the 16th century, the administration noticed that sailors from here were able to sail to Venice in less time than the government ships. As a result, it was then decided that the port be given the responsibility for the permanent mail service of the Republic. This was further established by a decree of 1625 that praises the inhabitants of the port for their conscientious and effective handling of the State mail. The decree was of tremendous significance for the town, as it freed its citizens from manual labor, a mandatory form of state service at that time. The decree officially made Perzagno a naval town, and its duties to the State were henceforth of an exclusively maritime nature.

The importance of reliable mail service was of great value to the Venetian Republic. Perzagno became the port from which the mail from Istanbul--which arrived overland through Montenegro--continued seaborne towards Venice. The town's ships were initially small in size, with crews of only nine men. The ships were ready to sail year-round and would negotiate the 400 mile journey to Venice by oar and sail.

The town's privileges grew, and, in 1704, it was granted its own municipal district inside Albania Veneta. This was followed by the State's freeing the town of many tariffs. The lifting of tariffs provided an impetus for economic growth which further developed the town's naval character. Maritime trade flourished and its ships grew in size and number, so that by the end of the 18th century the port was hailed as home to over 30 tall-ships. The most prevalent trade goods were Montenegrin and Greek cheese, candles, salted sardines, and Dalmatian and Greek olive oil. The most frequent ports of call for the town's sailors were in the East Mediterranean or Levant, together with Ancona, Apulia, Venice, and Trieste.

A significant setback for the port's maritime economy happened after the fall of the Venetian Republic (1797), which saw the arrival of the French under Napoleon and the resultant devastating British blockade of the Adriatic coast. The town was a part of the Napoleonic kingdom of Italy, but after Napoleon's defeat at the Bay of Kotor (Bocche di Cattaro) it was ceded to the Austrian Empire at the Congress of Vienna and became part of a province called the Kingdom of Dalmatia. This initiated a revival of the town's maritime economy which lasted until the end of the 19th century, after which its tall-ships could no longer compete with the rapid advances in steamship technology.

== Demographics ==
According to the 2011 census, its population was 1,130.

Ethnicity in 2011
Ethnicity	Number	Percentage
Montenegrins	535	47.3%
Serbs	254	22.5%
Croats	170	15.0%
Russians	11	1.0%
Albanians	9	0.8%
Italians	8	0.7%
Bosniaks	7	0.6%
Macedonians	6	0.5%
other/undeclared	130	11.5%
Total	1,130	100%

== Architecture ==
Architecture in Prčanj bears witness to its prosperity in the 17th and 18th centuries. The town's waterfront consists of a long line of stone villas, unified by their beautiful facades and separated by gardens and olive orchards. The most impressive feat of architecture in Prčanj is the Nativity of the Blessed Virgin Mary church. It seems out of proportion to the number of inhabitants and took 120 years to build (1789–1909).

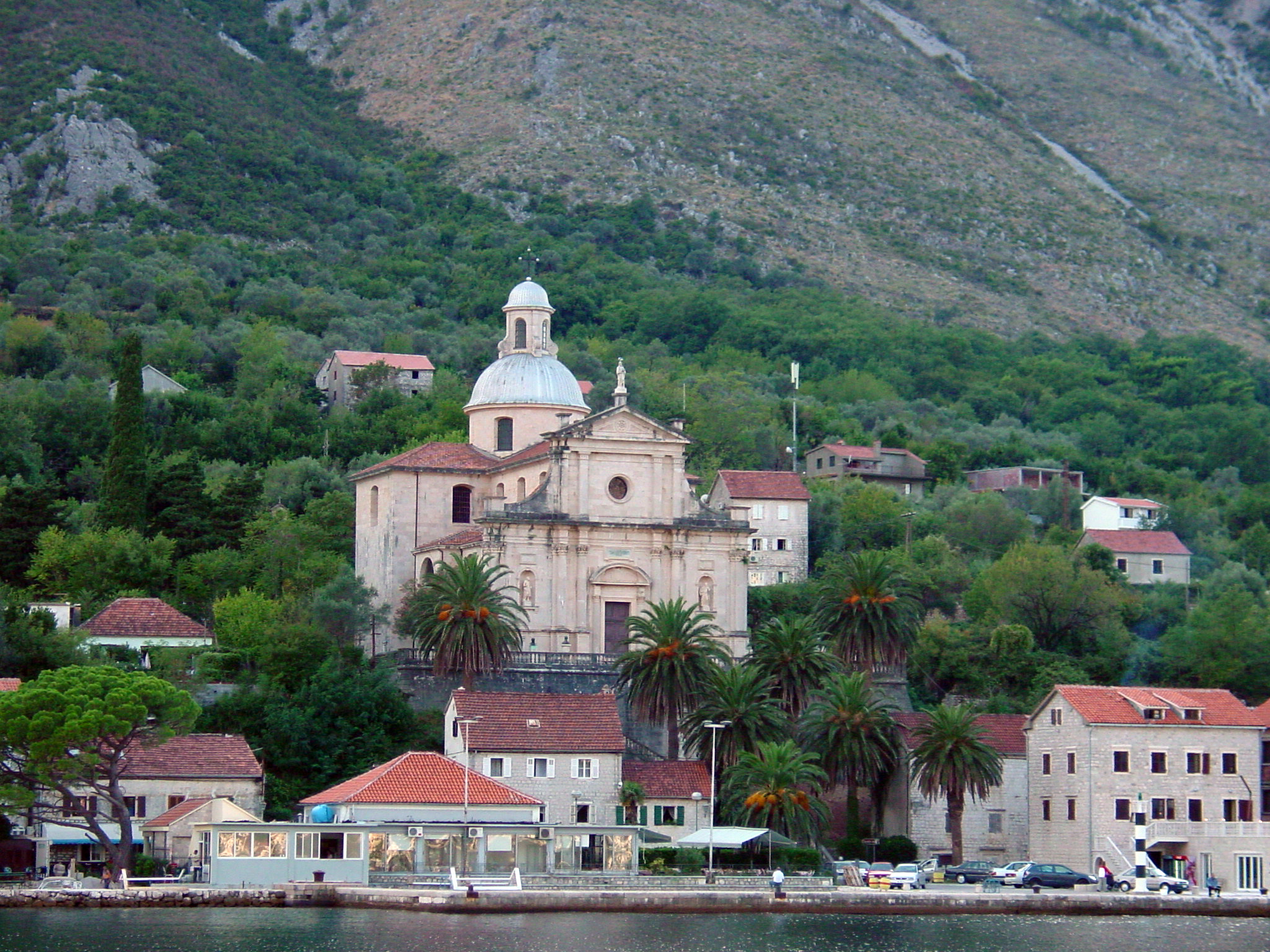
The church of the Nativity of the Blessed Virgin Mary in Prčanj

It was designed by a Venetian architect Bernardino Maccaruzzi. The church has a monumental baroque facade with Corinthian and Doric columns and displays a collection of paintings and sculptures worthy of its size, including works by Piazzetta, Tiepolo, Balestra, Meštrović, and numerous other artists.

== Notable people ==
- Ivan Visin (1806–1868), sea captain who embarked on a trip around the world and circumnavigated the globe aboard his ship Splendido.
- Saša Balić is a football player from Prčanj that currently plays for FK Bokelj and he used to play for Football Association of Montenegro and he played in many football clubs around Europe.
