= Uroš Desnica (politician) =

Croatian Serb and Yugoslavian politician and lawyer

- Born: 28 August 1874; Obrovac, Kingdom of Dalmatia, Austria-Hungary (now Croatia)
- Died: 1 July 1941 (aged 66); Split, Governorate of Dalmatia, Kingdom of Italy (now Croatia)
- Education: University of Vienna
- Occupations: Politician, lawyer
- Political party: Serb People's Party; People's Radical Party (after 1918)
- Relatives: Vladan Desnica (son)

Uroš Desnica (28 August 1874 – 1 July 1941) was a Croatian Serb and Yugoslavian politician and lawyer.

== Biography ==
Desnica graduated law from the University of Vienna and practiced law in Zadar until 1918. Desnica was a member of the Serb People's Party in the Kingdom of Dalmatia (then a part of Austria-Hungary). In 1905, he took part in the process of adoption of the Zadar Resolution — the decision of the Croatian Serb politicians in Dalmatia to endorse the Rijeka Resolution. The latter was a political agreement between a number of Croatian and Croatian Serb political parties on an alliance which led to founding of the Croat-Serb Coalition.

In the final days of the World War I, in the process of dissolution of Austria-Hungary, the National Council appointed Desnica a deputy member of the three-member provincial government of the former Austro-Hungarian crown land of Dalmatia. The government consisted of Ivo Krstelj, Josip Smodlaka, and Vjekoslav Škarica, while Desnica, Prvislav Grisogono, and Jerko Machiedo were appointed their deputies. The government administered the region in the run-up to the arrival of Allies of World War I and their occupation of the eastern Adriatic in 1918.

Following the end of the World War I and the dissolution of Austria-Hungary, Desnica was appointed the head of the regional Dalmatian government within the newly-established Kingdom of Serbs, Croats and Slovenes, and a member of the National Assembly elected on the People's Radical Party ticket. Upon introduction of the 6 January Dictatorship by the Alexander I of Yugoslavia, Desnica was appointed a senator by the king. In the interwar period, Desnica advocated the integral Yugoslavism, and joined the Chetnik movement in 1941.

== Sources ==
- Cukrov, Mladen (2013). "Admiral Philip Andrews u Splitu" [Allied Peacekeeping Mission in Split After the First World War and the Role of the U.S. Admiral Philip Andrews]. Kulturna baština (in Croatian). 39 (1). Split: Društvo prijatelja kulturne baštine: 97–112. ISSN 0351-0557.
- Batinović, Marita (1993). "Desnica, Uroš". Croatian Biographical Lexicon (in Croatian). Miroslav Krleža Institute of Lexicography.
