= Uroš Desnica (scientist) =

Croatian physicist (1944–2021)

- Born: 25 July 1944; Islam Grčki, Independent State of Croatia (now Croatia)
- Died: 17 November 2021 (aged 77); Zagreb, Croatia
- Education: University of Zagreb
- Occupation: Physicist
- Relatives: Vladan Desnica (father)

Uroš Desnica (25 July 1944 – 17 November 2021) was a Croatian physicist. In 1968, he graduated experimental physics from the Faculty of Science, University of Zagreb and started to work at the Ruđer Bošković Institute in the materials research and electronics department. He received his doctoral degree from the Zagreb University in 1978 for his research of the physics of semiconductors. In late 1980s, Desnica was a visiting scientist at the State University of New York and the Scientific Center of the Cabot Corporation in Boston.

== Sources ==
- Burčul, Leopold (17 November 2021). "Preminuo Uroš Desnica" [Uroš Desnica Dies]. Zadarski list (in Croatian).
- Kutleša, Stipe (1993). "Desnica, Uroš". Croatian Biographical Lexicon (in Croatian). Miroslav Krleža Institute of Lexicography.
