= Ivo Grisogono =

Politician in the kingdoms of Croatia-Slavonia and Yugoslavia

- Born: 18 February 1871; Cavtat, Kingdom of Dalmatia, Austria-Hungary (now Croatia)
- Died: 27 January 1945 (aged 73); Zagreb, Independent State of Croatia (now Croatia)
- Other name: Nevski
- Occupations: Public prosecutor, judge
- Relatives: Prvislav Grisogono (brother)

Ivo Grisogono (18 February 1871 – 27 January 1945) was a Croatian and Yugoslavian lawyer born in Cavtat. He studied law and earned his doctoral degree from the University of Graz before working as a public prosecutor in Šibenik, Zadar, and Split. Following the 1908 Bosnian Crisis, Grisogono was transferred to the position of a judge in Dubrovnik. After the outbreak of the First World War, Grisogono was interned together with his brother Prvislav due to his political views favouring integral Yugoslavism and political unification of the South Slavs and breakup of Austria-Hungary. In May 1918, after his release, Grisogono was a member of the governing body of the National Council of Slovenes, Croats and Serbs in Dalmatia. Following establishment of the Kingdom of Serbs, Croats and Slovenes (later renamed Yugoslavia), as a member of its Temporary National Representation, Grisogono publicly accused the Croatian Peasant Party and the Party of Rights of Croatian nationalist separatism in relation to the 1920 Croatian Peasant Rebellion. In 1920, Grisogono was appointed as the ambassador to Argentina until 1928. Grisogono published some of his works pseudonymically as "Nevski".
