= Lists of countries with people on postage stamps =

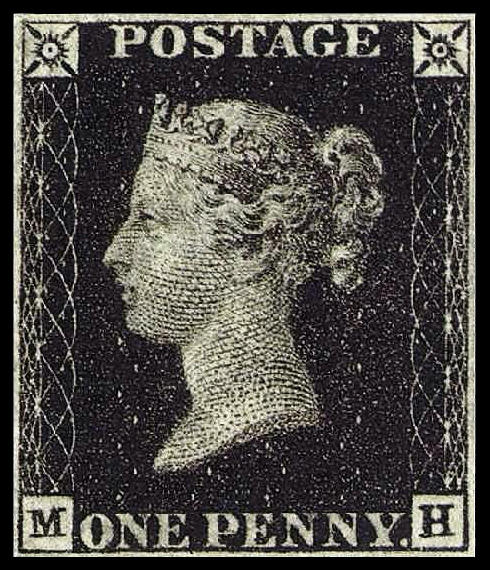
A Penny Black British postage stamp

Since 1840, when the Penny Black featured a profile of Queen Victoria, it has been a tradition worldwide for nations to honor people on their postage stamps.

The list that follows is an index to the lists of people for individual countries. In some cases, several short lists from related countries are merged into a single list, while entries without links indicate entities that never had any people on their stamps. The parenthesized dates following each entry indicates the first and last dates of stamp issuance; within each country's list, the date or dates indicates the year of the person's appearance on a stamp.

== C ==
- Canada (1851–)
- Canadian provinces (1850–1947)
- Central African Republic (1959–)
- Chile (1853–)
- People's Republic of China (1949–)
- Republic of China (1950–)
- Colombia (1859–)
- Costa Rica (1863–)
- Croatia (1941–1945, 1991–)
- Cuba (1855–)

== D ==
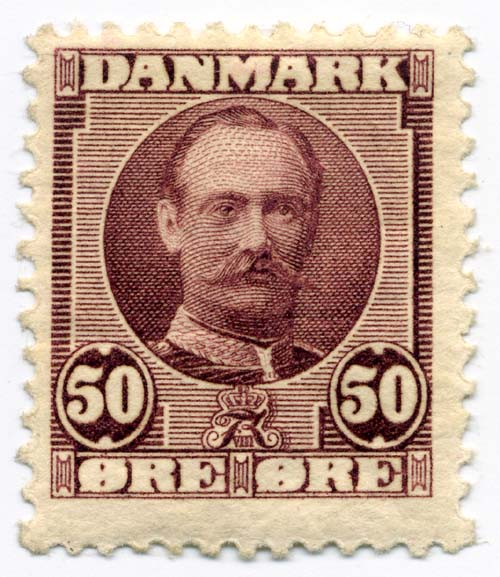
Frederick VIII, king of Denmark

- Denmark (1851–)
- Djibouti (1977–)

== F ==
- Faroe Islands (1919–)

== G ==
- German Democratic Republic (1949–1990)

== H ==
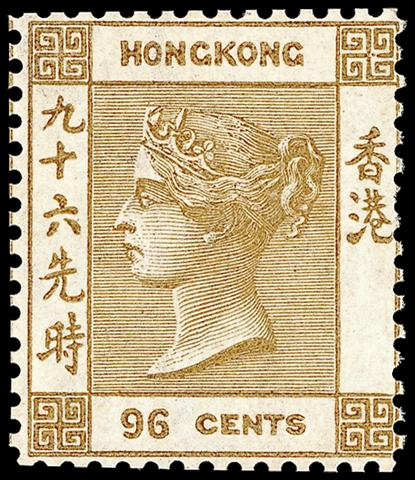
Hong Kong's 1862 96-cent stamp featuring Queen Victoria.

- Hawaii (1851–1899)
- Hong Kong (1862–1999)
- Hungary (1871–)

== I ==
- Iceland (1873–)
- India (1854–)
- Ireland (1922–)

== J ==
- Japan (1871–)

== L ==
- Latvia (1918–1940, 1991–)

== M ==
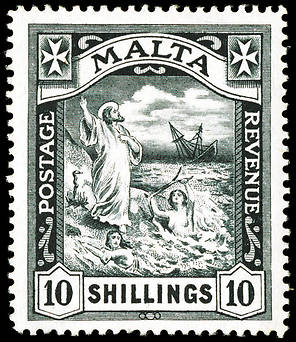
Saint Paul on a 1919 stamp of Malta

- Malta (1860–)
- Mexico (1856–)

== N ==
- Netherlands (1852–)
- Netherlands New Guinea (1950–1962)
- New Zealand (1855–)
- Nigeria (1914–)
- Norway (1855–)

== P ==
- Pakistan (1947–)
- Peru (1857–)
- Portugal (1853–)

== R ==
- Russia (1857–1923, 1992–)

== S ==
- Samoa (1877–)
- San Marino (1877–)
- Sri Lanka (1972–)
- Sudan (1897–)

== U ==
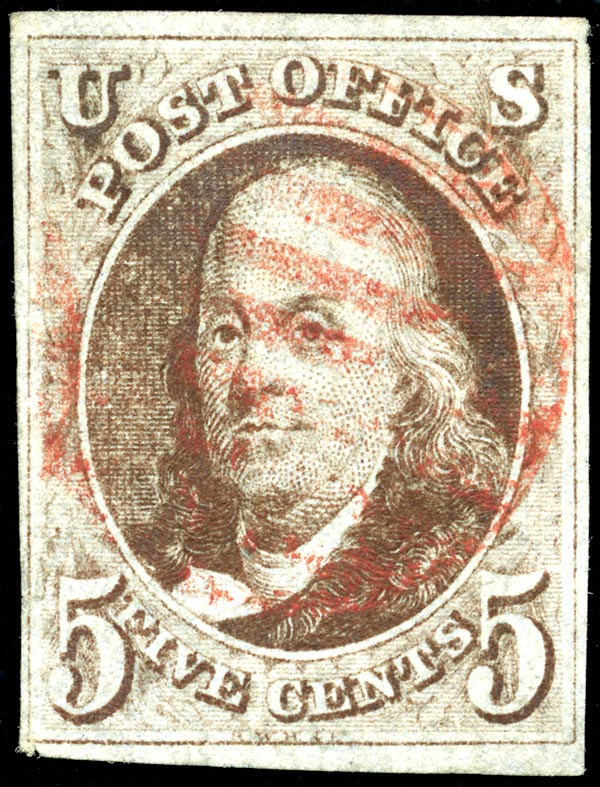
Benjamin Franklin on the first stamp of the United States, 1847

- United Kingdom (1840–)
- United States (1847–)

== Y ==
- Yugoslavia (1921-2006)

== See also ==
- Topical stamp collecting
