= List of people on the postage stamps of Taiwan =

This article contains a list of people who appeared on the stamps of the Republic of China commonly known as Taiwan. Alternate names appear in parentheses. Transcription of Chinese names can vary considerably. See also Stanley Gibbons Stamp Catalogue - Part 17 China.

== History ==
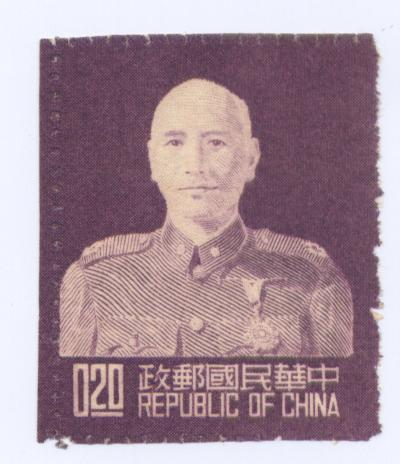
A 1953 postage stamp commemorating Chiang Kai-shek

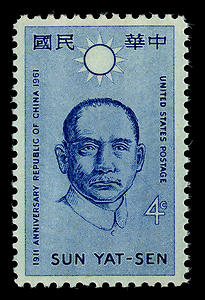
A 1961 stamp commemorating Sun Yat-sen, the Father of the Nation of Taiwan

Between 1949 and 1979, the Chunghwa Post issued postage stamps featuring 57 distinct people. The scholar Yu-Chin Huang divided the people into five categories: "political figures", "revolutionary martyrs", "cultural figures", "Chinese historical icons", and "ethical and mythical figures". People crucial to Taiwan's founding were in the "political figures" category, while those who died for Taiwan's founding were in the "revolutionary martyrs" category. The "cultural figures" category was populated with artists, engineers, scientists, and literary figures. While age-old military commanders and emperors filled the "Chinese historical icons" category, the "ethical and mythical figures" category had religious figures and Confucianism paragons.

Taiwan featured stamps of President Chiang Kai-shek and his wife Soong Mei-ling following the retreat of the government of the Republic of China to Taiwan in 1949. Whereas four eminent politicians such as Chiang's top assistant Chen Cheng were featured on postage stamps only after their deaths, Chiang and his wife were showcased on the stamps during their lifetimes. Addressing this in 1996, a Directorate General of Posts officer said, "people who are still alive or whose final verdict has not been pronounced after their death should not have commemorative postage stamps printed" but the Chiangs' postage stamps were made during "a hegemonic era of the cult of the great men". In total, Chiang was featured on 29 stamp issues while his wife was featured on four. Following his death, postage stamps rarely featured politicians since his son Chiang Ching-kuo, who became the next leader, aimed to discontinue cults of personality. There are deviations from the avoidance of featuring politicians on stamps. The first is a January 1989 set of stamps featuring Chiang Ching-kuo one year after his death. This was the sole time a stamp featured his portrait. The second is that Taiwan has quadrennial elections and the postal service releases stamps featuring the president and vice president who are taking office.

After the 1911 Revolution that led to the collapse of the Qing dynasty, the Nationalists' reign of the Republic of China began in 1912. The postal service featured images of revolutionary figures including Huang Xing. To commemorate soldiers killed in the Second Sino-Japanese War, the postal service released stamps featuring the general Zhang Zizhong and the pilot Gao Zhihang. By evoking the worst challenge it had faced, the government's goal through featuring martyrs on stamps was to showcase its effectiveness in overcoming adversity. According to the scholar Huang, the postal service therefore did not feature images of martyrs from the Chinese Civil War as it would remind viewers of their not achieving victory in the war.

Taiwan used postage stamps featuring Father of the Nation Sun Yat-sen to promote its national identity. To celebrate the centennial of American president Abraham Lincoln's birth, the postal service released a "Teachers of the Democracy" postage stamp. It featured Lincoln and Sun beside each other to represent their being paragons of democracy and human rights defenders. The stamp featured Sun's image and the Republic of China flag on one side, and Abraham Lincoln's image and the American flag on the other side. Below Sun's photo are the words "Minzu" (Chinese: 民族), "Minquan" (Chinese: 民權), and "Minsheng" (Chinese: 民生), which are his Three Principles of the People. Sun's principles were based on Lincoln's well-known quote "of the people, by the people, for the people", which appeared below his image. To celebrate the centennial of the birth of Sun, the postal service in 1965 released postage stamps featuring his image next to Taiwanese flags. During the Cold War, the beliefs of the Nationalists aligned with those of the United States. To promote the close relationship between Taiwan and the United States, the postal service issued stamps featuring the American political dignitaries Eleanor Roosevelt and Dwight D. Eisenhower. In 1967, the postal service issued a "Chinese Poets" stamps set that featured Tang dynasty poets Du Fu, Li Bai, and Bai Juyi, and patriotic poet Qu Yuan.

== A ==
- Buzz Aldrin, astronaut
- Neil Armstrong, astronaut

== B ==
- Bai Juyi (Po Chu-i), poet (1967)
- Budai, monk

== C ==
- Cai Yuanpei (Tsai Yuan-pei), educator (1967)
- Chen Cheng, general and politician (1968)
- Chen Chien-jen, vice president (2016)
- Chen Shui-bian, president
- Chiang Ching-kuo, president
- Chiang Kai-shek, military and political leader (1952, 1953, 1955, 1956, 1958, 1961, 1966, 1967, 1968)
- Madame Chiang Kai-shek (Soong Mei-ling), first lady (1961, 1965)
- Michael Collins, astronaut
- Confucius, philosopher (1965)

== D ==
- Dai Anlan, military commander
- Du Fu (Tu Fu), poet (1967)

== E ==
- Dwight D. Eisenhower, US president (overprint only 1960)

== G ==
- Gao Zhihang, military aviator
- Genghis Khan, Mongol emperor (1962)

== H ==
- Rowland Hill, inventor of the postage stamp (1979)
- Hongwu (T'ai Tsu), Ming dynasty emperor (1962)
- Hua Tuo, physician (1970)
- Huang Xing, revolutionary and first-commander-in-chief of the Republic of China

== K ==
- Genghis Khan, emperor of the Mongol Empire
- Koxinga (Cheng Ch'eng-kung), military commander (1950, 1962)

== L ==
- Lai Ching-te, vice president (2020)
- Laozi, philosopher and writer
- Lee Teng-hui, president
- Li Bai (Li Po), poet (1967)
- Lin Sen, president (1966)
- Lin Zexu, political philosopher and politician
- Annette Lu, vice president
- Lu Haodong, revolutionary
- Abraham Lincoln, US president (1959)

== M ==
- Ma Ying-jeou, president (2008)
- George Leslie Mackay, missionary
- Maitreya, future Buddha
- Mencius, philosopher (1957, 1965)

== N ==
- Florence Nightingale, English nurse and founder of modern nursing (1964)

== Q ==
- Qiu Fengjia, patriot, educator, and poet
- Qiu Jin (Ch'iu Chin), feminist and revolutionary (1967)
- Qu Yuan, (Ch'u Yuan), poet (1967)

== R ==
- Eleanor Roosevelt, US first lady and human rights advocate (1964)

== S ==
- Sa Shijun, naval officer
- Shide, monk
- Emperor Shun, legendary leader of ancient China
- Vincent Siew, vice president
- Sun Yat-sen, revolutionary (1955, 1959, 1961, 1963, 1965)

== T ==
- Taizong (T'ai-Tsung), Tang dynasty emperor (1962)
- Taizu (T'ai tsu), Song dynasty emperor (1962)
- Teresa Teng, singer and actress (2015). Her commemorative stamps were the first time that the postal service had commemorated an artist.
- Tsai Ing-wen, president (2016, 2020)

== W ==
- Wen Tianxiang (Wen T'ien-hsiang), general and poet (1966)
- Woo Tsin-hang (Wu Chih-huei), philosopher and linguist (1964)
- Wu Zhihui

== X ==
- Xie Jinyuan, military commander
- Xu Guangqi (Hsu Kuang-ch'i), scholar and bureaucrat (1964)
- Xuanzang (Hsuan Chuang), traveller and monk (1970)

== Y ==
- Yan Haiwen, military officer who died in combat with the Japanese
- Emperor Yao, ruler
- Yen Chia-kan, president
- Yu Youren (Yu Yu-jen), revolutionary leader (1962)
- Yue Fei, military leader (1957, 1966, 1970)

== Z ==
- Zhan Tianyou, railroad engineer
- Zhang Zhizhong, military commander and politician
- Duke of Zhou, member of royal family
- King Zhou of Shang, ruler
- King Wen of Zhou, ruler
- King Wu of Zhou, ruler
- King Xiao of Zhou, ruler
- Zhu Xi (Chu Hsi), philosopher (1970)

== See also ==
- Chunghwa Post
- List of people on the postage stamps of Hong Kong
- List of people on the postage stamps of the People's Republic of China
- Lists of countries with people on postage stamps
- Postage stamps and postal history of Taiwan

== Bibliography ==
- Huang, Yu-Chin (2007). National identity and ideology in the design of postage stamps of China and Taiwan 1949-1979 (PhD). University of London. pp. 229–250. Archived from the original on 2022-06-15 – via E-Theses Online Service.
