= Latvijas Pasts =

Company based in Riga, Latvia

VAS Latvijas Pasts
- Logo since June 2025
- Type: State joint-stock company
- Industry: Mail
- Founded: 2 January 1992
- Headquarters: Riga, Latvia
- Number of locations: 600 post offices (2013)
- Area served: Latvia
- Key people: Beāte Krauze-Čebotare (Chairman of the Board); Kristaps Krūmiņš; Andris Puriņš; Jānis Kūliņš
- Revenue: ▲58 million EUR (2013); 37.99 million LVL (2012)
- Net income: ▼4.5 million EUR (2013); 3.41 million LVL (2012)
- Total assets: 128,687,723 (2023)
- Owner: Government of Latvia
- Number of employees: ▼ more than 4,200 (2013); 4,413 (2012)
- Website: pasts.lv/pakalpojumi

VAS Latvijas Pasts (English: Latvian Post) is the national postal operation of Latvia and a state owned company established in 1992. It provides universal postal services, parcel delivery and logistics, employing several thousand people. In recent years, the company has focused on rebranding and digital transformation while operating in a competitive market alongside private courier companies.

== History ==
Latvijas Pasts was founded on 2 January 1992 as a state-owned company, prior to which multiple postal companies had already existed in the territory. On 1 November 2004, Latvijas Pasts was re-registered as a state joint-stock company instead of having the status of a nonprofit organization state stock company.

In 2014, Latvijas Pasts partook in the transition from lats to euro that took place in the whole country by providing currency exchange services following the official exchange rate of 1.00 LVL for 1.42 EUR for 3 months in 302 post offices where it was deemed necessary due to local banking service availability issues.

== Services ==
Latvijas Pasts provides a wide range of postal and related services throughout Latvia. Its main responsibility is ensuring a universal postal service, which includes sending and receiving letters and parcels both within the country and abroad. By the beginning of 2025, Latvijas Pasts had installed more than 420 parcel machines, continuing to expand the network to achieve previously set goals. Latvijas Pasts has more than 600 service locations nationwide.

== Competition ==
Latvijas Pasts currently has five competitors that have established parcel delivery networks — Omniva, DPD, Venipak, Itella and Unisend Latvia. Latvia and the other Baltic countries rank first in terms of the number of machines per capita.

== Staffing ==
Latvijas Pasts is one of the biggest employers in Latvia’s postal and logistics sector, with a team of approximately 1,800–2,300 employees. Latvijas Pasts offers careers in over 250 professions and maintains structured workforce development and engagement initiatives.

== Financials and development ==
In 2023, Latvijas Pasts had net turnover of €108.3 million and net profit of €0.5 million; export revenue accounted for €37.1 million of turnover. In the same year, the company invested €5.8 million in logistics and item-processing operations.

The parcel-locker market in Latvia includes six network operators: Latvijas Pasts, Omniva, DPD, Venipak, Itella and Unisend Latvia. In 2024, Latvijas Pasts planned to install 440 parcel lockers by the end of the year and more than 500 by the following year.

In April 2026, Latvijas Pasts announced the establishment of subsidiaries in Estonia and Lithuania, Pasts OÜ and Pasts UAB, with operations expected to start in the second half of 2026.

== See also ==
- Postage stamps and postal history of Latvia
- List of people on stamps of Latvia
