= Postage stamps and postal history of Latvia =

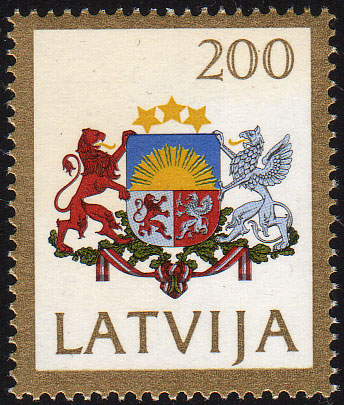
Stamp of Latvia, 1991

Postal history in the territory that now constitutes Latvia began during the 13th century, when the Archbishopric of Riga was included to the area of postal operations of the Monastic state of the Teutonic Knights and the Hanseatic League. In 1580 the Hanseatic League issued their first known regulations on courier work and payroll (German: Botenordnung), regulations that also were active in the territory that now constitutes Latvia.

== Livonian Postal Service ==
From 1581 to 1621, when Riga was under the rule of the Duchy of Livonia, and also from 1621 to 1710, when it was a part of Swedish Livonia, postal services were used only for governmental purposes. In the 16th century several postal organisations existed—for governmental purposes, as well as for clerics, universities, cities and merchants. In 1632 the Postmaster General of Prussia and Livonia, Jacob Becker, who was appointed in Swedish Livonia by the King of Sweden, organised the first regular public postal service. Initially, the postal service was the private property of the Postmaster General, who also received annual funding from the Riga City Council and the Governors of Swedish Livonia. In 1644 the Livonian Postal Service was linked to the Stockholm Postal Service routes in Finland. In 1685 the Duke of Courland Friedrich Casimir initiated his own postal service and asked the Swedish authorities to cease their postal operations within his territory, but King Charles XI of Sweden ignored his request and stood for his rights in Courland. On 5 July 1710, Russian troops under the command of Tsar Peter I of Russia took over Riga and made it a part of the Russian Empire.

== World War I ==
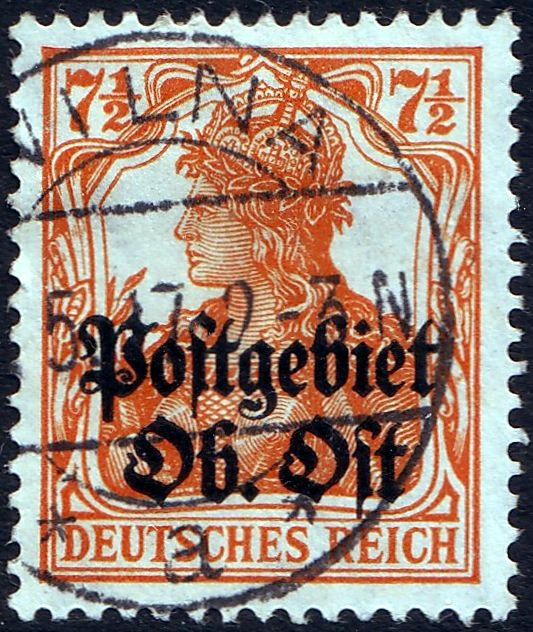
German stamp overprinted for use in area controlled by the Ober Ost

During World War I, Latvia was occupied by Germany, and used German stamps overprinted by the Ober Ost.

In 1919, German stamps were handstamped "LIBAU", but it was unclear whether they were officially issued; all used copies are cancelled to order.

== Independent Latvia ==
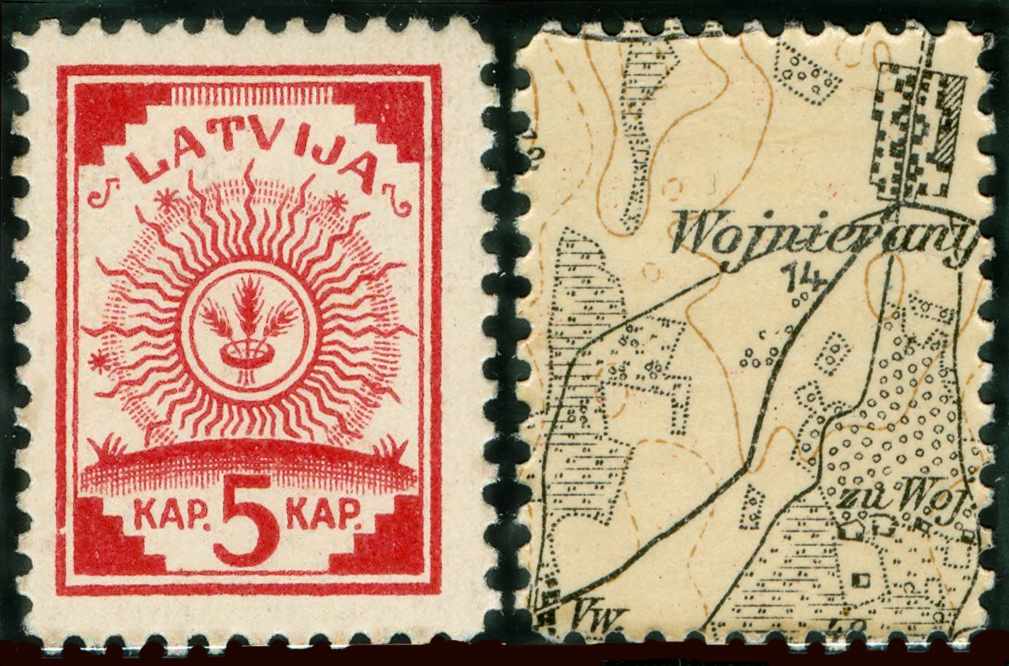
First stamp of independent Latvia, 1918

Latvia proclaimed its independence on 18 November 1918, and issued its first stamps on 18 December. The design was a depiction of the country's Coat of Arms. Unusually, since paper was in short supply, the first printings were on the backs of leftover German military maps; by 1919, paper with ruled lines was in use.

Latvia issued a variety of definitive and commemorative stamps through the 1920s and 1930s. Definitives used variations on a design featuring the arms, surmounted by three stars, representing Vidzeme, Courland, and Latgale.

== World War II ==
As part of the Soviet occupation of Latvia in 1940, a series of 13 stamps were issued, depicting the arms of Soviet Latvia and inscribed "Latvijas // PSR".

These were shortly superseded by the occupation of Latvia by Nazi Germany. At first existing stocks of Soviet stamps were used, overprinted "LATVIJA // 1941 // 1. VII", then the stamps for the Reichskommissariat Ostland and regular German stamps came into use, in October 1941.

In April 1945, Germans stamps were overprinted "KURLAND" and used in the Courland Pocket.

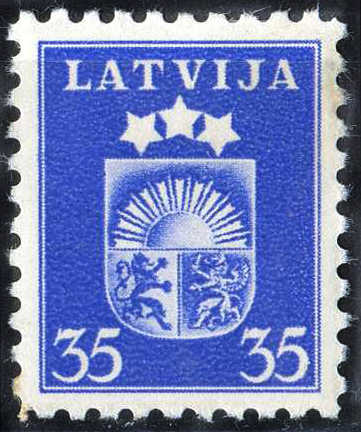
Early Soviet issue for Latvia, 1940

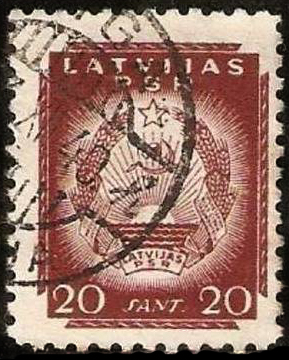
Soviet issue for Latvia, 1940

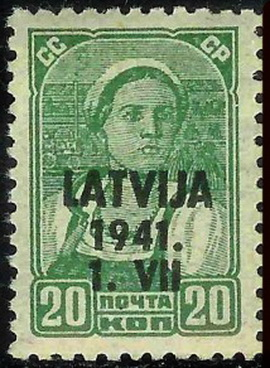
German occupation overprint for Latvia, 1941

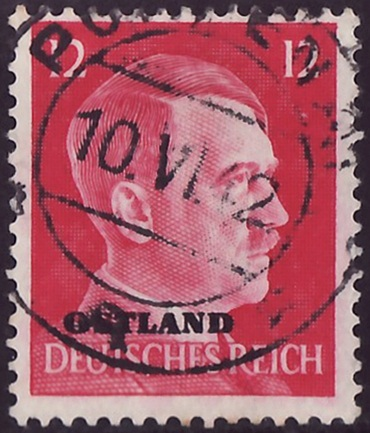
Stamp for the Reichskommissariat Ostland, 1941

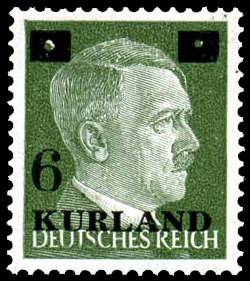
German stamp used in the Courland Pocket, 1945

== Soviet era ==
Post-war, Latvia reverted to the use of Soviet stamps.

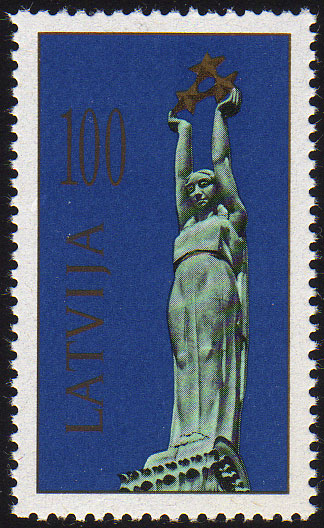
Stamp of Latvia issued in 1991 depicting the Freedom Monument in Riga

== Restoration of independence ==
With the restoration of independence, Latvia resumed its own stamp program in 1991.

== See also ==
- Latvijas Pasts
- Joint issues of Latvia
- Postage stamps and postal history of Estonia
