= List of people on the postage stamps of Yugoslavia =

This is a list of people on postage stamps of Yugoslavia (State of Slovenes, Croats and Serbs, Kingdom of Serbs, Croats and Slovenes, Kingdom of Yugoslavia, Socialist Yugoslavia and Serbia and Montenegro), including the years in which they appeared on a stamp.

== A ==
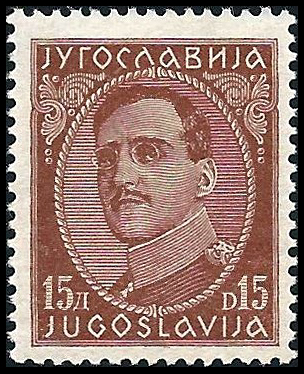
Alexander I on a 1932 definitive stamp, the most frequently depicted person in the Kingdom of Yugoslavia

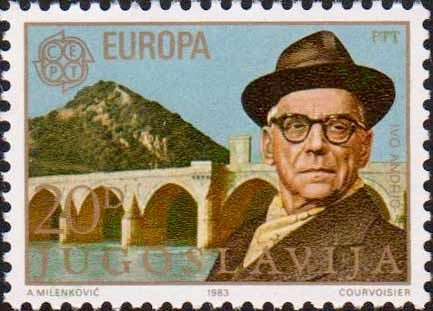
Ivo Andrić on a 1983 Europa Stamp

- Kosta Abrašević, poet (1979)
- Mirče Acev, People's Hero (1951)
- Mija Aleksić, actor (2003)
- Alexander Alekhine, Russian-French chess player (1995)
- Alexander I of Yugoslavia, King of Yugoslavia (1921, 1923, 1924, 1926, 1929, 1931, 1932, 1933, 1934, 1935, 1938)
- Andrew of Yugoslavia, Prince of Yugoslavia (1937)
- Ivo Andrić, writer and Nobel laureate (1983)
- Saint Anne, biblical figure (1983)
- Arsenije Sremac, medieval archbishop (1994)
- Athanasius of Alexandria, Christian saint (1999)
- Aurelian, Roman emperor (1980)

== B ==
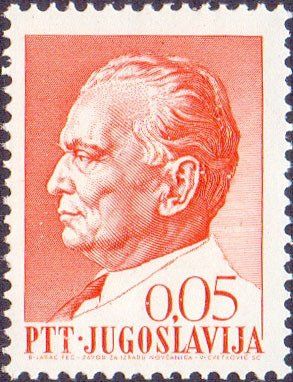
Josip Broz Tito on a 1967 definitive stamp, the most frequently depicted person during the Socialist Yugoslavia

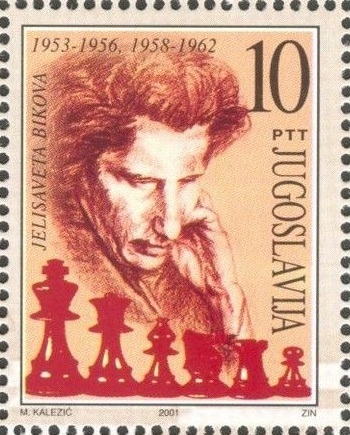
Elisaveta Bykova on a 2001 commemorative stamp

- Spasenija Babović, people's hero (1984)
- Matija Balović, sea captain (2005)
- Saint Barbara, Christian martyr (1989)
- Basil of Ostrog, Christian saint (1992)
- Stanislav Binički, composer and conductor (1997)
- Saint Blaise, Christian saint (1990)
- Ljubinka Bobić, actress (2003)
- Ruđer Bošković, mathematician, astronomer, physicist and poet (1960, 1987)
- Mikhail Botvinnik, Russian chess player (1995)
- Hasan Brkić, People's Hero (1968)
- Ivana Brlić-Mažuranić, writer (1975)
- Ivan Bronza, sea captain (2005)
- Josip Broz Tito, president of Yugoslavia (1945, 1950, 1951, 1952, 1953, 1961, 1962, 1966, 1967, 1968, 1969, 1972, 1974, 1977, 1978, 1980, 1981, 1982, 1983, 1984, 1985, 1986, 1987, 1988, 1989, 1990)
- Marija Bursać, people's hero (1984)
- Elisaveta Bykova, Soviet chess player (2001)

== C ==
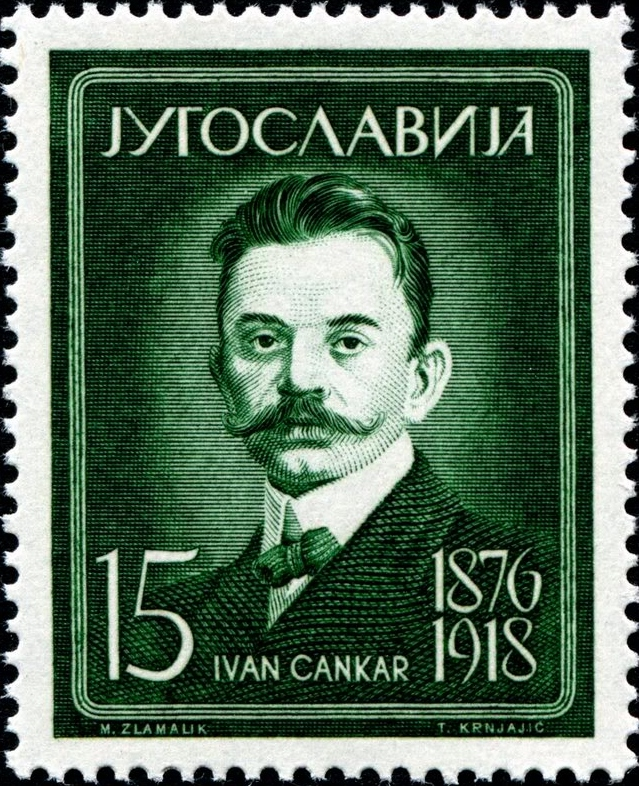
Ivan Cankar on a 1960 commemorative stamp

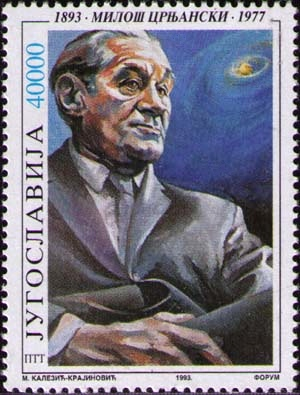
Miloš Crnjanski on a 1993 commemorative stamp

- Rudi Čajavec, pilot and people's hero (1985)
- Ivan Cankar, writer (1960, 1976)
- Jose Raul Capablanca, Cuban chess player (1995)
- Tončka Čeč, people's hero (1984)
- Jelena Ćetković, people's hero (1984)
- Maia Chiburdanidze, Georgian and Soviet chess player (2001)
- Frédéric Chopin, Polish-French composer and pianist (1999)
- Clement of Ohrid, medieval Bulgarian writer (1961, 1986)
- Christopher Columbus, Spanish-Italian navigator (1192)
- Constantine the Great, Roman emperor (1971)
- Svetozar Ćorović, writer (1975)
- Miloš Crnjanski, writer and journalist (1993)
- Jovan Cvijić, Serbian geographer (1970)

== D ==
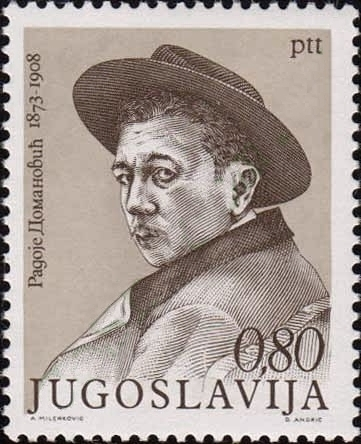
Radoje Domanović on a 1973 commemorative stamp

- Radoje Dakić, people's hero (1973)
- Đuro Đaković, communist politician (1979)
- Đuro Daničić, linguist (1948)
- Decius, Roman emperor (1980)
- Goce Delčev, Macedonian freedom fighter (1972, 1992)
- Nada Dimić, people's hero (1984)
- Diocletian, Roman emperor (1980)
- Radoje Domanović, Serbian satirical writer (1973, 1988)
- Jovan Đorđević, theatre director, poet and politician (2005)
- Vladan Đorđević, Prime Minister of Serbia and founder of the Red Cross of Serbia (1936, 1996)
- Radovan Dragović, communist politician (1978)
- Stefan Dragutin, medieval king of Serbia (1997)
- Dragojlo Dudić, people's hero (1973)
- Emin Duraku, people's hero
- Stefan Dušan, Serbian emperor (1951)

== E ==
- Albert Einstein, German physicist, Nobel laureate (2004, 2005)
- Friedrich Engels, German philosopher (1964)
- Ephrem the Syrian, Christian saint (1999)
- Max Euwe, Dutch chess player (1995)

== F ==
- Filip Filipović, communist politician (1978)
- Bobby Fischer, American chess player (1992, 1996)
- Jure Franko, alpine skier and Olympic medalist (1984)

== G ==
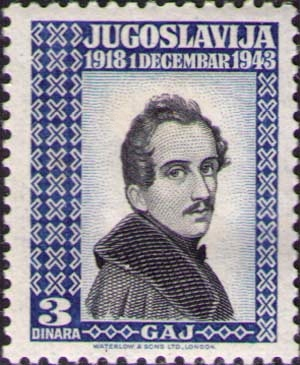
Ljudevit Gaj on a 1943 stamp issued by the Yugoslav government-in-exile

- Ljudevit Gaj, Croatian linguist (1943, 1963)
- Jacobus Gallus, Austrian composer of Slovene origin (1991)
- Nona Gaprindashvili, Georgian and Soviet chess player (2001)
- Vasil Glavinov, Macedonian socialist (1969)
- Simon Gregorčič, Slovene poet (1957)
- Milan Grol, writer, journalist and politician (2005)
- Damjan Gruev, Macedonian revolutionary (1971)
- Matija Gubec, leader of the Croatian–Slovene Peasant Revolt (1940)
- Ivan Gundulić, poet and senator (1989)

== H ==
- Kosta Hakman, painter (1977)
- Nikola Hećimović, communist politician (1979)

== I ==
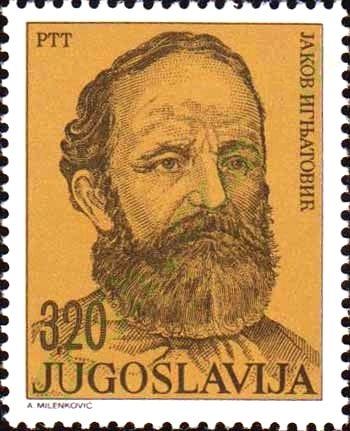
Jakov Ignjatović on a 1975 commemorative stamp

- Jakov Ignjatović, writer (1975)
- Delfa Ivanić, founder of the Circle of Serbian Sisters (2003)
- Marko Ivanović, navy captain (2005)

== J ==
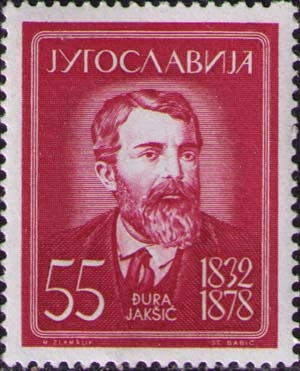
Đura Jakšić on a 1960 commemorative stamp

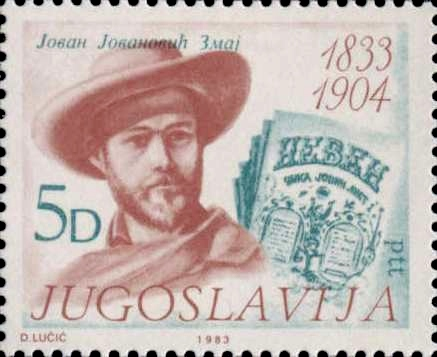
Jovan Jovanović Zmaj on a 1983 commemorative stamp

- Đura Jakšić, poet and painter (1960, 1982, 1998)
- Anton Janša, first teacher of beekeeping (1973)
- Dragojla Jarnević, writer (1975)
- Euthymius the Great, Christian saint (1999)
- Jesus Christ, religious leader (1968, 1969, 1970, 1983, 1990, 1991, 1992, 1993, 1996, 1997, 1999, 2000, 2001, 2002, 2003, 2004)
- John the Baptist, biblical figure (1994, 1999, 2002, 2003)
- John of Patmos, biblical figure (1999)
- Mihailo Jovanović, metropolitan bishop (1998)
- Paja Jovanović, painter (1960)
- Soja Jovanović, director (2005)
- Žikica Jovanović, People's Hero (1951)
- Jovan Jovanović Zmaj, Serbian poet (1954, 1983)
- Kuzman Josifovski, People's Hero (1968)

== K ==
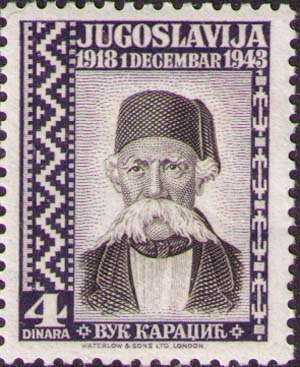
Vuk Karadžić on a 1943 stamp issued by the Yugoslav government-in-exile

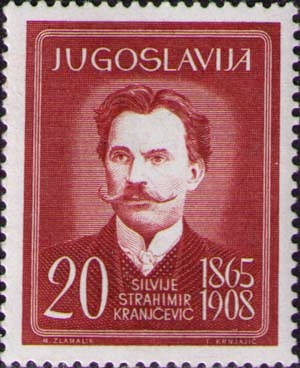
Silvije Strahimir Kranjčević on a 1960 commemorative stamp

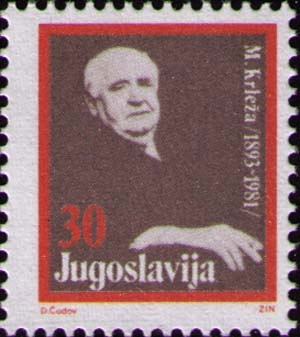
Miroslav Krleža on a 1988 postal tax stamp

- Andrija Kačić-Miošić, Croatian writer (1954)
- Karađorđe, leader of the First Serbian Uprising (1943, 1954, 2004)
- Vuk Karadžić, Serbin linguist and language reformer (1943, 1947, 1963, 1987)
- Elpida Karamandi, people's hero (1984)
- Jovan Karamata, mathematician (2002)
- Edvard Kardelj, communist politician (1980)
- Nikola Karev, leader of the Ilinden uprising (1953)
- Anatoly Karpov, Russian and Soviet chess player (1996)
- Garry Kasparov, Russian and Soviet chess player (1996)
- Boris Kidrič, politician and People's hero (1973)
- Hugo Klajn, theatre director and psychiatrist (2005)
- Julije Klović, painter (1978)
- Franjo Kluz, pilot and people's hero (1985)
- Robert Koch, German bacteriologist and Nobel laureate (1982)
- Petar Kočić, Serbian writer (1977)
- Rade Končar, People's Hero (1968)
- Milan Konjović, painter (1998)
- Lovrenc Košir, postage stamp pioneer (1948)
- Sava Kovačević, People's Hero (1951, 1980)
- Alojz Kraigher, Slovenian writer (1977)
- Miroslav Kraljević, painter (1977)
- Silvije Strahimir Kranjčević, poet (1960)
- Miroslav Krleža, Croatian writer (1988)
- Yoakim Karchovski, Macedonian writer (1970)
- Oton Kučera, Croatian mathematician, physicist and astronomer (1957)

== L ==
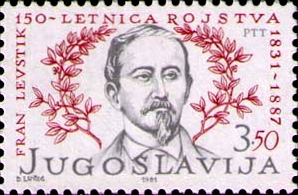
Fran Levstik on a 1981 commemorative stamp

- Mihailo Lalić, writer (1999)
- Emanuel Lasker, German chess player (1995)
- Lazar of Serbia, Serbian prince (1939, 1992)
- Vladimir Lenin, Russian revolutionary (1960, 1967, 1970, 1974)
- Fran Levstik, writer (1965, 1981)
- Otto Lilienthal, German aviation pioneer (1991)
- Anton Linhart, Slovenian writer (1957)
- Vatroslav Lisinski, Croatian composer (1954)
- Petar Lubarda, painter (1999)
- Luke the Evangelist, biblical figure (1987, 2000)
- Auguste Lumière, French cinema pioneer (1995)
- Louis Lumière, French cinema pioneer (1995)

== M ==
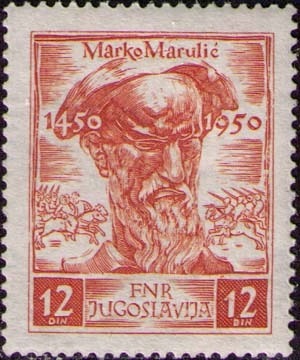
Marko Marulić on a 1951 commemorative stamp

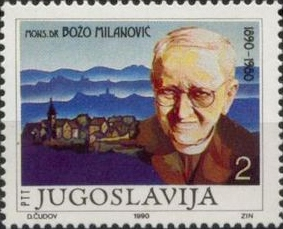
Božo Milanović on a 1990 commemorative stamp

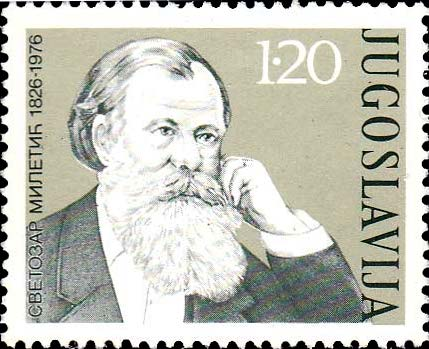
Svetozar Miletić on a 1976 commemorative stamp

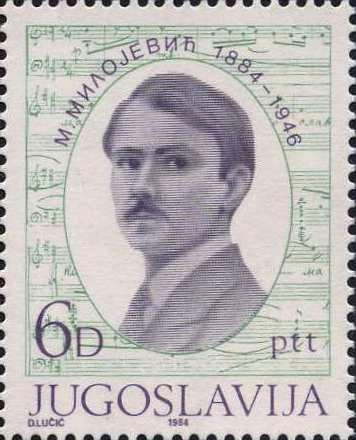
Miloje Milojević on a 1984 commemorative stamp

- Macarius of Egypt, Christian saint (1999)
- Desanka Maksimović, poet (1996, 1998)
- Milton Manaki, photographer and cinema pioneer (1980)
- Marc of Thrace, Christian saint (1999)
- Guglielmo Marconi, Italian innovator and physicist (2004)
- Mary Magdalene, biblical figure (1991)
- Maria of Yugoslavia, Queen of Yugoslavia (1936)
- Maria Theresa of Spain, Queen of France (1987)
- Sonja Marinković, people's hero (1984)
- Prince Marko, medieval ruler (1963)
- Svetozar Marković, writer (1946, 1975)
- Grga Martić, poet and theologian (1975)
- Nikola Martinoski, painter (1977)
- Marko Marulić, father of Croatian literature (1951)
- Karl Marx, German philosopher (1964, 1968)
- Mary, mother of Jesus, Biblical person (1968, 1969, 1970, 1983, 1991, 1992, 1993, 1994, 1996, 1997, 1999, 2000, 2001, 2003, 2004, 2005)
- Matthew the Apostle, biblical figure (1989)
- Antun Gustav Matoš, writer (1965)
- Josip Mažar, people's hero (1973)
- Ivan Mažuranić, poet and politician (1965)
- Vera Menchik, Russian-Czechoslovak-British chess player (2001)
- Saint Mercurius, Christian saint (1999)
- Methodius, apostle of the Slavs, patron saint of Europe (1985)
- Franz Miklosich, philologist and slavist (1963)
- Dimitar Miladinov, Macedonian poet (1961)
- Konstantin Miladinov, Macedonian poet (1961)
- Milan I of Serbia, King of Serbia (2003)
- Milutin Milanković, mathematician, astronomer and geophysicist (1979, 2004)
- Božo Milanović, clergyman and politician (1990)
- Svetozar Miletić, Serbian politician (1976)
- Marko Miljanov, Montenegrin military leader and writer (1970, 1999)
- Miloje Milojević, composer and musicologist (1984)
- Mata Milošević, actor (2005)
- Milo Milunović, painter (1999)
- Stefan Milutin, medieval king of Serbia (1990)
- Dobrica Milutinović, actor (2003)
- Ivan Milutinović, People's Hero (1968)
- Stjepan Mitrov Ljubiša, Montenegrin writer (1975, 1999)
- Andrija Mohorovičić, meteorologist (1963)
- Stevan Mokranjac, Serbian musicologist and composer (1957, 2001, 2005)
- Vasilije Mokranjac, composer (1998)
- Wolfgang Amadeus Mozart, Austrian composer (1991)

== N ==
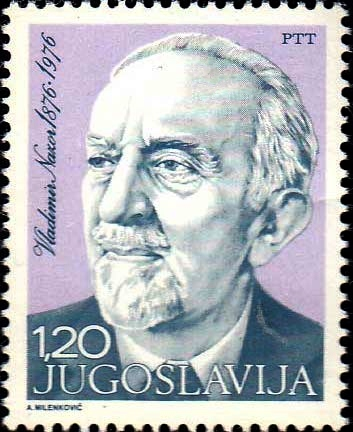
Vladimir Nazor on a 1976 commemorative stamp

- Vladimir Nazor, Croatian writer (1976)
- Kole Nedelkovski, poet (1987)
- Stefan Nemanja (as Saint Simeon), Serbian medieval ruler (1968, 1992, 1999)
- Matija Nenadović, Serbian writer and military leader (1977)
- Saint Nicetas, Christian martyr (1969)
- Nicholas I of Montenegro, prince and king of Montenegro (1974, 1992, 1995, 2005)
- Branislav Nušić, playwright (1965)

== O ==
- Dositej Obradović, writer (1963)
- Mihailo Obrenović, Prince of Serbia (1966, 1991, 1995)
- Miloš Obrenović, Prince of Serbia (1994)
- Onuphrius, Christian saint (1999)
- Marko Orešković, People's Hero (1951)

== P ==
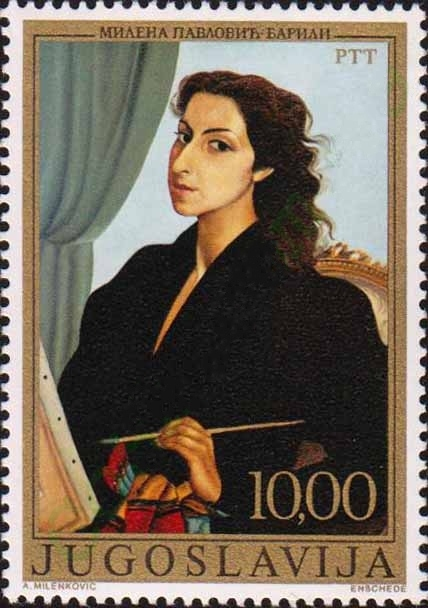
Milena Pavlović-Barili self-portrait on a 1977 commemorative stamp

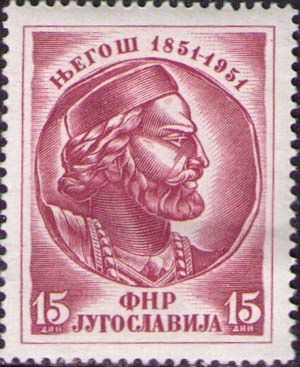
Petar II Petrović-Njegoš on a 1951 commemorative stamp

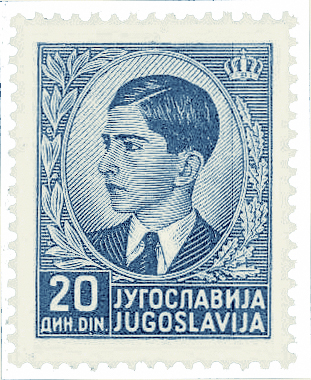
Peter II on a 1939 definitive stamp

- Pachomius the Great, Christian saint (1999)
- Josif Pančić, botanist (1965)
- Paul of Thebes, Christian saint (1999)
- Paul of Yugoslavia, Prince regent of Yugoslavia (1936)
- Milena Pavlović-Barili, painter (1977)
- Vasa Pelagić, Bosnian socialist (1970)
- Peter I of Serbia, King of Serbs, Croats and Slovenes (1919, 1920, 1921)
- Peter II of Yugoslavia, King of Yugoslavia (1932, 1933, 1935, 1939, 1943)
- Saint Petka, Christian saint (1992)
- Tigran Petrosian, Soviet chess player (1996)
- Gyorche Petrov, politician (1981)
- Mihailo Petrović Alas, mathematician (1993)
- Nadežda Petrović, Serbian painter (1976, 1998)
- Petar I Petrović-Njegoš, Montenegrin prince-bishop (1996, 1997, 2005)
- Petar II Petrović-Njegoš, Montenegrin prince-bishop and poet (1943, 1947, 1951, 1963, 1988, 1997)
- Vasilije Petrović, metropolitan bishop (2004)
- Veljko Petrović, poet (1984)
- Moša Pijade, politician and People's Hero (1968, 1982)
- Strahil Pindžur, People's Hero (1973)
- Raša Plaović, actor and theatre director (2003)
- Pero Poček, painter (1999)
- Susan Polgar, Hungarian chess player (2001)
- Jovan Sterija Popović, Serbian playwright (1957, 2006)
- Miladin Popović, politician and people's hero (1985)
- Milan Predić, playwright (2005)
- Uroš Predić, painter (1982)
- France Prešeren, Slovene poet (1949)
- Ivan Prijatelj, writer (1975)
- Probus, Roman emperor (1980)
- Procopius of Scythopolis, Christian saint (1999)
- Michael Pupin, physicist and electrical engineer (1960, 1979, 2004)
- Radomir Putnik, Serbian military leader (1997)

== R ==
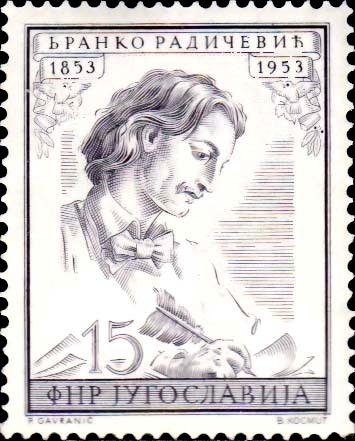
Branko Radičević on a 1953 commemorative stamp

- Kočo Racin, Macedonian writer (1983)
- Franjo Rački, historian (1948, 1966)
- Antun Radić, Croatian politician (1940)
- Stjepan Radić, Croatian politician (1940)
- Branko Radičević, Serbian poet (1953)
- Jovanka Radivojević, people's hero (1984)
- Zoran Radmilović, actor (2003)
- Vuko Radović, painter (1999)
- Milutin Ranković, medical doctor (1997)
- Ivan Ribar, politician (1981)
- Ivo Lola Ribar, people's hero (1973)
- Wilhelm Röntgen, German physicist and Nobel laureate (1995)
- Franc Rozman, Partisan leader (1951)
- Olga Rubtsova, Soviet chess player (2001)
- Nicolaas Rubens, son of the painter Peter Paul Rubens (1987)
- Lyudmila Rudenko, Soviet chess player (2001)
- Edvard Rusjan, aviation pioneer (1960, 1991)

== S ==
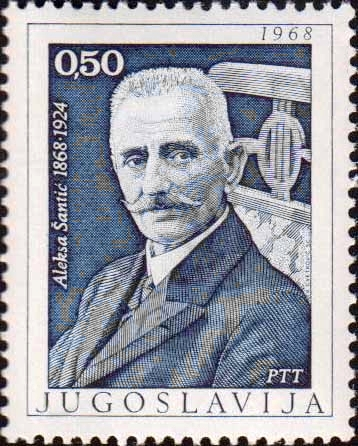
Aleksa Šantić on a 1968 commemorative stamp

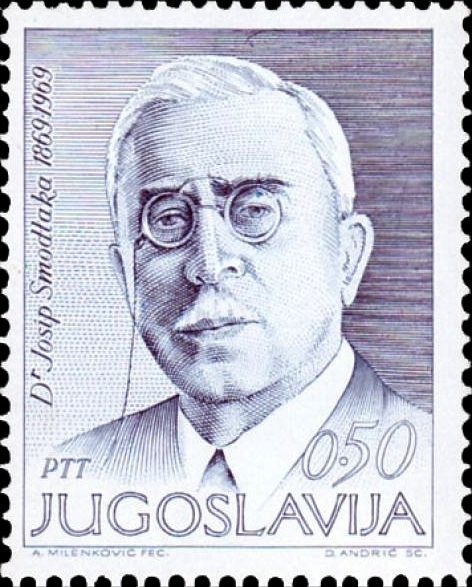
Josip Smodlaka on a 1969 commemorative stamp

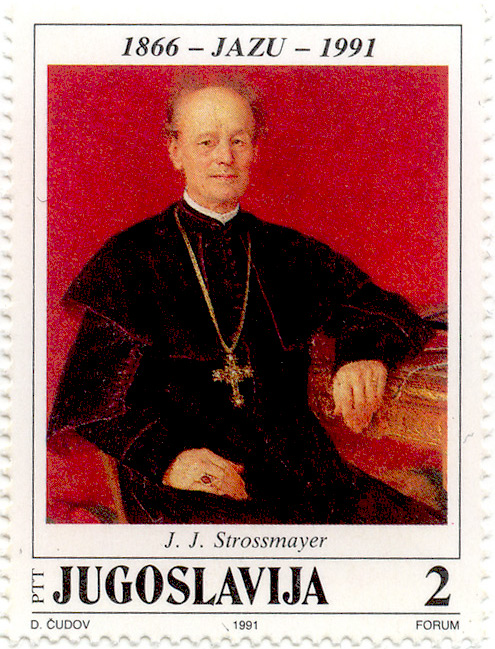
Josip Juraj Strossmayer on a 1991 commemorative stamp

- Aleksa Šantić, Serbian poet (1968, 1993)
- Saint Sava, religious leader (1968, 1990, 1999, 2004)
- Giorgio da Sebenico, sculptor and architect (1973)
- Isidora Sekulić, writer (1996)
- August Šenoa, Croatian writer (1981)
- Josip Smodlaka, politician and publicist (1969)
- Vasily Smyslov, Soviet chess player (1995)
- Simo Šolaja, People's Hero (1951)
- Boris Spassky, Russian and Soviet chess player (1992, 1996)
- Stevan Sremac, writer (2005)
- Andrija Štampar, Croatian social medicine expert (1970)
- Borisav Stanković, Serbian writer (1976)
- Ilija Stanojević, actor and theatre director (2003)
- Wilhelm Steinitz, Austrian chess player (1995)
- Stephen the Younger, Christian saint (1999)
- Risto Stijović, sculptor (1999)
- Sreten Stojanović, sculptor (1998)
- Žanka Stokić, actress (2003)
- Josip Štolcer-Slavenski, composer (1985)
- Josip Juraj Strossmayer, Croatian bishop and politician (1943, 1948, 1966, 1991)
- Bojan Stupica, director, actor and architect (2005)
- Frano Supilo, Croatian politician (1971)

== T ==
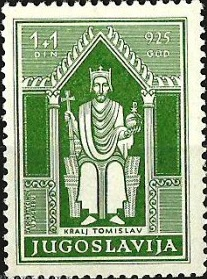
Tomislav of Croatia on a 1940 commemorative stamp

- Ivan Tabaković, painter (1998)
- Mikhail Tal, Soviet chess player (1995)
- Nikola Tesla, physicist and electrical engineer (1936, 1953, 1956, 1976, 1993, 2000, 2001, 2006)
- Theoctistus of Palestine, Christian saint (1999)
- Žarko Tomić Sremac, folk hero (2002)
- Tomislav of Yugoslavia, Prince of Yugoslavia (1937)
- Tomislav of Croatia, King of Croatia (1929, 1940)
- Tone Tomšič, People's Hero (1968)
- Mira Trailović, actress (2005)
- Trajan, Roman emperor (1999)
- Primož Trubar, author of the first book in Slovene language (1951, 1986)
- Marko Tsepenkov, writer and art historian (1979)
- Dimitrije Tucović, writer (1965, 1981)

== U ==
- Tin Ujević, Croatian poet ()1991

== V ==
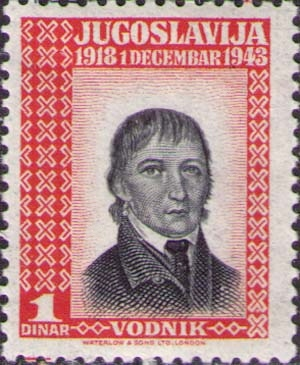
Valentin Vodnik on a 1943 stamp issued by the Yugoslav government-in-exile

- Đorđe Vajfert, businessman, governor of the Central Bank (2004)
- Johann Weikhard von Valvasor, polihistor (1989)
- Ivan Vavpotič, painter (1977)
- Jurij Vega, Slovenian mathematician (1954)
- Queen Victoria, Queen of the United Kingdom (1990)
- Ivan Visin, sea captain (1982)
- Filip Višnjić, Serbian folk poet and musician (1954)
- Valentin Vodnik, Slovene poet (1943)
- Joakim Vujić, playwright and theatre director (1985)
- Luka Vukalović, leader of the Herzegovina uprising (1961)
- Mihailo Vukotić, painter (1977)

== W ==
- Ed White, American astronaut (1967)
- Orville Wright, American aviation pioneer (2003)
- Wilbur Wright, American aviation pioneer (2003)

== X ==
- Xie Jun, Chinese chess player (2001)

== Z ==
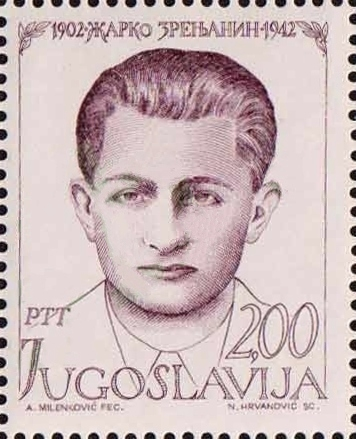
Žarko Zrenjanin on a 1973 commemorative stamp

- Ivan Zajc, composer and conductor (1982)
- Petar Želalić, sea captain (2005)
- Rajko Žinzifov, Madedonian writer (1977)
- Milivoje Živanović, actor (2003)
- Žarko Zrenjanin, people's hero (1973)
- Oton Župančič, Slovenian writer (1970)
- Cvijeta Zuzorić, poet (1997)

== See also ==
- Postage stamps and postal history of Yugoslavia
- Lists of countries with people on postage stamps

== Sources ==
- Westlicher Balkan 2022 (in German). Michel. pp. 211–417. ISBN 978-3-95402-386-8.
- "Jugoslavija". Katalog poštanskih maraka jugoslovenskih zemalja. 1991. ISSN 0351-4447.
- "Jugoslavija". Katalog poštanskih maraka jugoslovenskih zemalja. 1991–2001. ISSN 0354-7841.
