= Postage stamps and postal history of Samoa =

This is a survey of the postage stamps and postal history of Samoa.

Samoa, formerly known as Western Samoa, is a country encompassing the western part of the Samoan Islands in the South Pacific Ocean. It became independent from New Zealand in 1962. The two main islands of Samoa are Upolu and Savai'i.

== First stamps - The Samoa Express ==
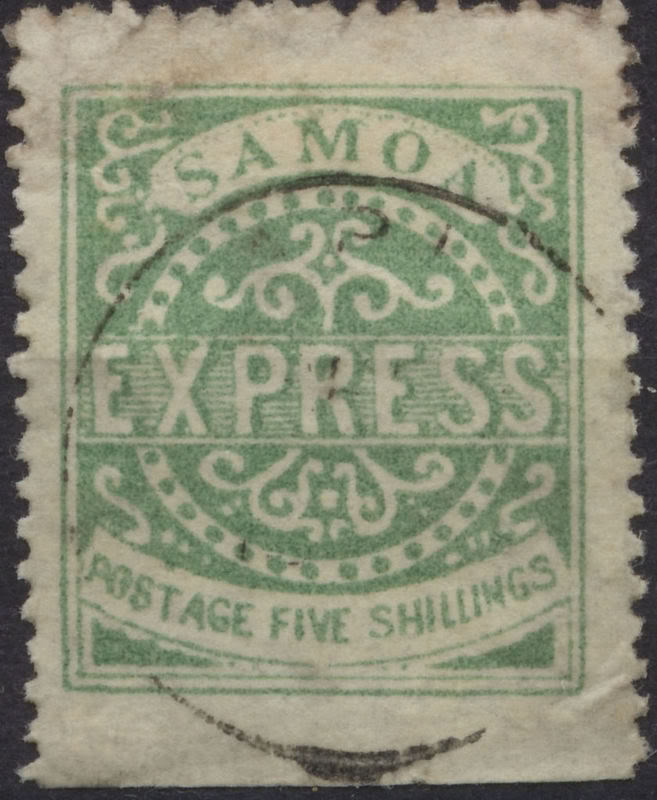
A circa 1877 five shilling Samoa Express stamp

The first stamps of Samoa were issued in 1877. The Samoa Express private post was set up in 1877 and ended in 1881. The stamps were remaindered, reprinted and forged.

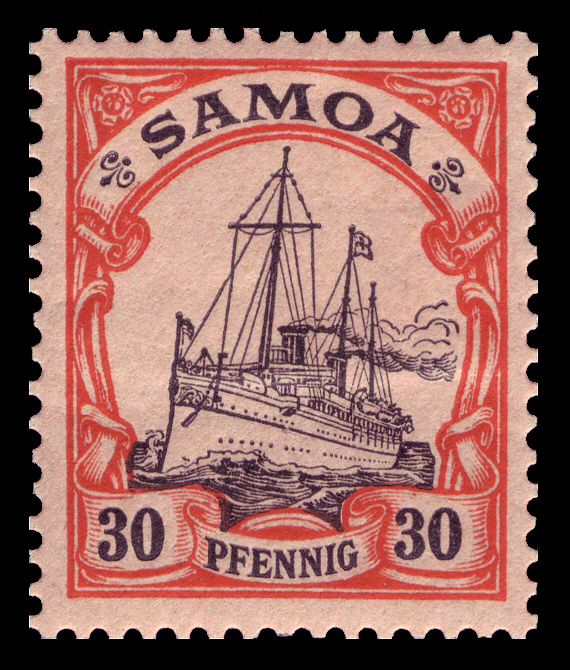
A 1900 stamp for Samoa as a German colony

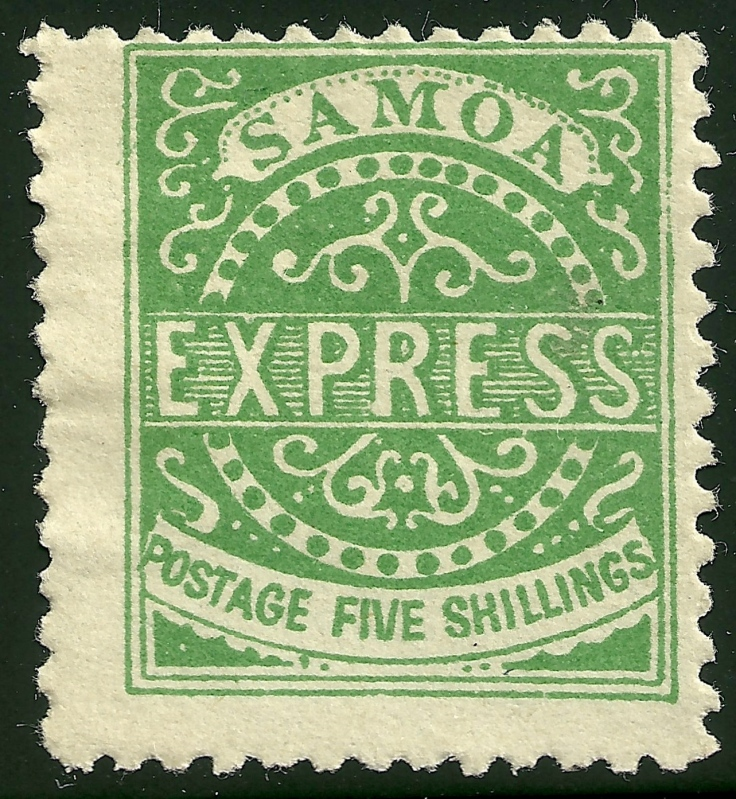
An apparent forgery of the same stamp

== Private issues ==
A private service was set up by J. Davis In 1886. Stamps designated "Samoa Postage" were issued between 1886 and 1899.

== German issues ==
German stamps were first used in German Samoa on 21 September 1886, in the form of vorläufer stamps that can be recognized by the "Apia" cancellation mark. In April 1900 German stamps with "Samoa" overprint became available. In December 1900, the yacht issue was introduced.

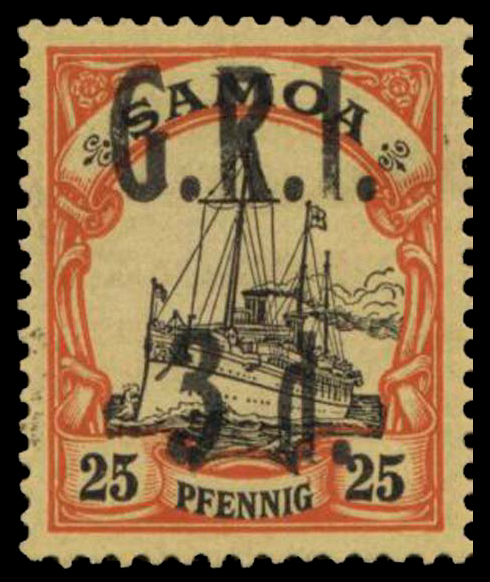
Stamp of German Samoa overprinted by New Zealand occupation forces, 1914

== New Zealand issues ==
After New Zealand forces occupied German Samoa in 1914, stamps of German Samoa were overprinted "G.R.I." (short for Georgius Rex Imperator, referring to the incumbent British King George V). These were followed by stamp of New Zealand overprinted "Samoa".

The first stamps of the mandated territory of Western Samoa were issued in 1921.

== Independence ==
Samoa issued stamps as an independent state on 2 July 1962.

== See also ==
- Postage stamps and postal history of the German colonies - Samoa
- List of people on stamps of Samoa
