= Postage stamps and postal history of Estonia =

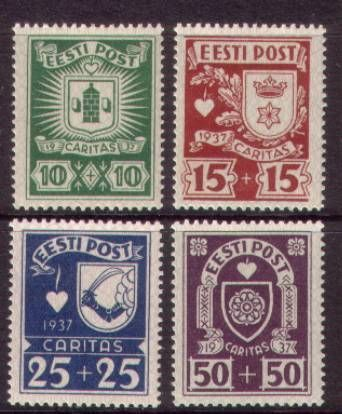
Estonian stamps: 1937. Caritas issues.

This is a survey of the postage stamps and postal history of Estonia. The stamps of Estonia are issued by the postal administration Eesti Post (Estonian: Eesti Post) which is the country's only provider of universal postal services.

In 1625, mainland Estonia came entirely under Swedish Empire rule. Estonia was administratively divided between the provinces of Estonia (in the north) and Livonia (in southern Estonia and northern Latvia), a division which persisted until the early 20th century.

Due to the wars in Denmark, Germany and in the Baltic provinces the postal communications were of vital importance to the Swedish Government and especially to the military authorities. There was not yet a general postal organization at that time. As the postal route via Denmark periodically was interrupted, the mail from Sweden to Germany was often directed either via Finland and Tallinn or via seaway to Riga. This background explains the appointment in 1625 of Jakob Becker of Riga as Postmaster for Livonia and Prussia. In 1631 Becker was made responsible for the printing shop of the University of Tartu. The public notice "Postordnung" of 26 September 1632 printed in Tartu by Becker can be considered to be the opening date for general mail in Estonia.

== History ==
1918: A Russian stamp overprint. Questionable.

After the end of the Great Northern War Estonia was incorporated in the Russian Empire through the Peace of Uusikaupunkti (Nystad) in 1721. This period of Estonian history began already with the surrender of Tallinn in 1710. The needs for a properly functioning postal service had become so important that already in the negotiations about the capitulation one of the conditions of the cities was that post offices should be re-opened and that postal communications with neutral countries should remain open. These conditions were accepted by the Russian authorities. At the beginning the postal communications were rather sporadic and mainly met the military needs. In 1704 Narva was included in the postal route Saint Petersburg - Narva - Pskov - Velikiye Luki - Poland.

The first Estonian stamps inscribed "Eesti Post" were issued on 24 November 1918 and were used concurrently with some Russian values overprinted for use in Estonia, though the provenance of these latter issues is questioned.

=== The declaration of independence and the first stamp of Estonia ===
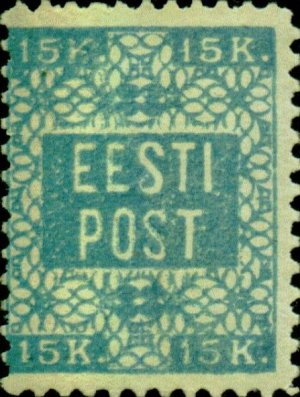
1919: The second postage stamp of Estonia, perforated. Official

After the Bolshevik takeover of power in Russia during the October Revolution of 1917 and German victories against the Russian army, between the Russian Red Army's retreat and the arrival of advancing German troops, the Committee of Elders of the Maapäev issued the Estonian Declaration of Independence in Pärnu on 23 February and in Tallinn on 24 February 1918. On 25 February 1918, the German occupation authorities gained control over the Tallinn Post Office and liquidated the former postal service. On 13 November 1918 the Commander of the Estonian Defence League Colonel Johan Unt appointed Hindrek Rikand with a directive as the Commandant of the Tallinn Post and Telegraph Office and ordered him to take the Office under his guard. The Estonian Postal Administration considers this date as its date of organizational establishment.

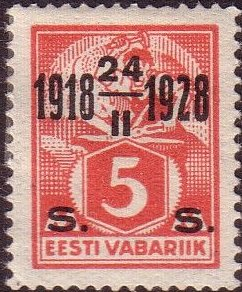
1928: Estonia's 10th anniversary. Overprint

The first Estonian stamps were put into circulation in November 1918. On 22 and 30 November, the first stamps bearing a flower ornament and having the nominal values of 5 and 15 kopecks were issued. These first issues were printed by the Bölau Printing House in the town of Nõmme (now a district of Tallinn). The perforated 15 kopecks of the Flowers Issue was a perforation trial ordered by the Postal Authorities. The trial was made on sheets of printers waste from the 1st and 2nd printings (perf. 11½). The marginal stamps were not perforated on the outside. Therefore, there are stamps perforated only on three or two (corner stamps) sides. The trial was not considered successful and therefore not repeated. The total number of the perforated stamps is not known and very likely it will remain unknown.

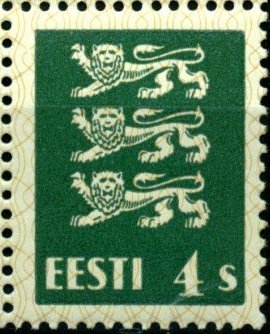
1930s: Coat of arms lions. Standard stamps.

According to Schönherr, the Post Office in Tallinn sold about 6,500 stamps to a dealer, who sent most of them via Finland to Germany. The package never arrived and its fate is still unknown. It has been mentioned in the literature that a small number of stamps was sold over the counter by the Post Office. The exact figure is also unknown.

The total number of the stamps still in circulation is thought to be no greater than 1000 of which genuine items are very rare. Most of the "perforated" stamps in collections are forgeries or private perforations - which can to be recognized by good perforation quality and the stamps mostly being from the 4th and 5th printings. Especially rare is the block of four and naturally on cover. Probably 2-3 covers may exist at all. The perforated 15 kopecks of the Flowers Issue remains one of the most rare and mysterious postage stamps of Estonia.

Estonia joined the Universal Postal Union (UPU) on 19 May 1922. In addition to the ordinary mail (based on road transport), Estonia also had a ship and air mail services. Naval transport was used for sending mail to Helsinki and Stockholm. In 1923, Aeronaut Airlines began to carry mail six times a week to Helsinki and Riga. Before the start of the Second World War (in 1939) and the Soviet annexation (in 1940) a total of 163 stamps and 4 stamp blocks were put into circulation.

=== The development of the Postal Service ===
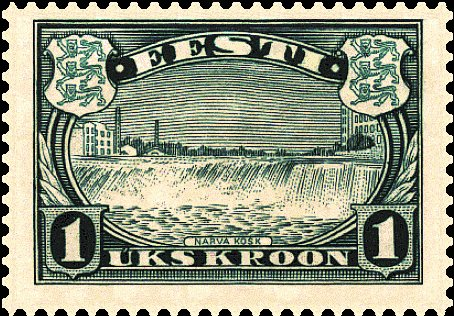
1940: Narva waterfalls. The 2nd issue; darker tones.

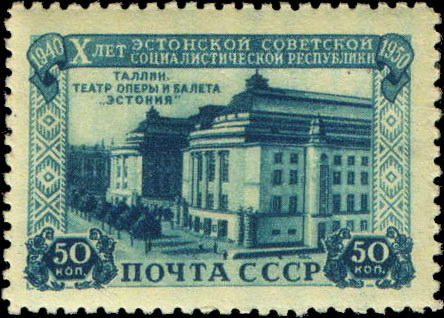
Estonian National Opera in Tallinn (Soviet stamp from 1950)

By 1935, the Postal Administration earned already a profit of 1.5 million krones with more than 3,600 outlets in Estonia's territory for the provision of postal, 782 ones, of telegraph, and 1.841 ones, of telephone services. The service network included 120 combined post-telegraph-telephone offices, the rest of the system consisted of auxiliary units – 600 postal agencies and nearly 3000 "letter farms".

World War II and the Soviet deportations inflicted great damages to the well-developed postal network of Estonia, but the organization conscientiously continued its everyday work; although short pauses occurred in the areas of immediate hostilities.

== Stamps ==
From its renewed existence in 1991, Eesti Post, since 2014 also known as Omniva, issued an average of 25 to 30 different stamps, souvenir sheets and booklets a year, with an annual total face value ranging from about ten (until 2009) to twenty euros (2010 and onwards). The most popular themes, such as lighthouses, manor halls as architectural monuments, folk costumes, Estonian birds, animals, as well as Christmas stamps became established over time and run into long series issued over several years. Prominent among the sports stamps they issued, were those featuring Estonian Olympic gold medal winners.

In addition to definitives and thematic sets, Eesti Post issued First Day Covers and cards, maximum cards and provided special cancellations among their philatelic products. They also offered year-sets in folders at a premium both for stamps and First Day Covers.

In December 2017, the World Online Philatelic Agency (WOPA) recognised an Estonian stamp designed by Indrek Ilves and depicting a lynx as the most beautiful stamp of 2017.

== See also ==
- Joint issues of Estonia
- Postage stamps and postal history of Latvia
