= Thomas Trood =

Australian businessman (1833–1916)

Thomas Trood (11 February 1833 – 23 March 1916) was an entrepreneur notable for acting as British Vice Consul in Samoa during the period it was annexed by Germany in 1900. Known colloquially as the "Grand Old Man of Samoa" for his long service in local affairs, he was commemorated in a set of the nation's postage stamps in 1968.

== Biography ==
Thomas Trood was born at Taunton, Somerset but emigrated with his family aged five to Sydney. His father, also called Thomas Trood, became one of the first master printers in New South Wales. When Thomas Trood senior died, Thomas Trood junior sailed back to England with his mother in the Thomas Arbuthnot, a ship that also carried the first gold mined in Australia to England on its way to be exhibited at the Great Exhibition.

In 1853 Trood returned to Sydney, later acquiring The Maid of Alicante, a ship with which he went into business trading goods such as pearlshell around the islands of Oceania. Lured by tales of a pearlshell "Treasure Island" he kept searching in vain until, eventually, he had exhausted his savings.

Thomas Trood returned to Samoa in 1860. For the next 18 years he worked as a bookkeeper, and later manager, for more successful British and German entrepreneurs in Samoa and Tongatabu before finally starting another business of his own. Witnessing, recording and reporting local political developments over many decades, Thomas Trood's diligent and benevolent support for Samoa earned him great respect.

When it was discovered that writer Robert Louis Stevenson was buried on his land by mistake, Trood presented the land to the Stevenson family in perpetuity.

Thomas Trood died on 23 March 1916.
