= List of people on the postage stamps of Samoa =

This is a list of people on stamps of Samoa.

The year given is the year of issue of the first stamp depicting that person.

Data has been entered up to the end of 2005.

== A ==
- Buzz Aldrin (1989)

== B ==
- The Lord Baden-Powell (1982)
- Otto von Bismarck (1990)
- Louis Antoine de Bougainville (1968)

== C ==
- Prince William (now Duke of Cambridge) (1997)
- James Cook (1970)

== D ==
- William Henry Draper III (1990)

== E ==
- The Duke of Edinburgh (1992)
- Edward VII (1914)
- The Prince Edward (1997)
- The Princess Elizabeth (later Elizabeth II) (1946)
- Queen Elizabeth (later the Queen Mother) (1946)

== F ==
- Faʻalavaʻau Galu, minister of post office, radio and broadcasting (1967)
- Peter Fatialofa (1991)
- Rita Fatialofa (2003)
- Beatrice Faumuina (2003)
- Fatu Feuʻu (2003)
- Benjamin Franklin (1971)

== G ==
- Jean-François de Galaup, comte de Lapérouse (1987)
- George V (1915)
- George VI (1946)
- Aggie Grey, hotelier (1971)

== H ==
- Edmond Halley (1986)
- Paul P. Harris (1980)
- Prince Harry (1985)
- Rowland Hill (1979)

== J ==
- Michael Jones (2003)

== K ==
- Martin Luther King Jr. (1969)

== L ==
- Lily Laita (2003)
- Pati Levasa, fire dancing champion (2001)
- Charles Lindbergh (1977)

== M ==
- Tuilaʻepa Saʻilele Malielegaoi (2005)
- Malietoa Laupepa (1892)
- Malietoa Tanumafili II (1963)
- The Princess Margaret (1946)
- Fritz Marquardt (1968)
- Afioga Afoafouvale Misimoa, South Pacific Commission secretary-general (1972)

== N ==
- Frank C. F. Nelson, minister of works, marine and civil aviation (1967)

== P ==
- Pope Paul VI (1970)
- Zara Phillips (1997)

== R ==
- Eleanor Roosevelt (1981)
- Franklin D. Roosevelt (1981)

== S ==
- Jesse Sapolu (2003)
- Wilhelm Solf (1968)
- Robert Louis Stevenson (1939)

== T ==
- Abel Tasman (1987)
- Vanya Tauleʻalo, artist (2003)
- Toʻomata Tua L., minister of lands (1967)
- Thomas Trood (1968)
- David Tua (2003)
- Tuatagaloa Leutele S., minister of justice (1967)
- Michel Tuffery (2003)
- Tupua Tamasese Meaʻole (1963)

== V ==
- Queen Victoria (1914)
- Rev. Father Violette, Roman Catholic missionary (1970)
- Momoe Malietoa Von Reiche, artist (2003)

== W ==
- George Washington (1982)
- The Countess of Wessex (1999)
- The Prince of Wales (1981)
- The Princess of Wales (1981)
- John C. Williams (1968)
- William Willis (1974)

== Y ==
- Princess Eugenie of York (1999)

== Z ==
- Zhu Rongji (2005)

== See also ==
- Postage stamps and postal history of Samoa
