= List of people on the postage stamps of Djibouti =

This is a list of people on the postage stamps of Djibouti and its precursors.

== Obock (1892-1894) ==
No identifiable persons are depicted on the postage stamps of Obock.

== Djibouti (1893-1902) ==
No identifiable persons are depicted on the postage stamps of the French colony of Djibouti.

== French Somali Coast (1902-1967) ==
- Governor Bernard, Colonial administrator who died in 1935 (1960)
- Diane de Poitiers (1937)
- Félix Éboué (1945)
- Léonce Lagarde (1938)

== French Territory of the Afars and Issas (1967-1977) ==
- Clément Ader (1975)
- André-Marie Ampère (1975)
- Alexander Graham Bell (1976)
- Albert Calmette, scientist (1972)
- Nicolaus Copernicus (1973)
- Marie Curie (1974)
- Charles de Gaulle, French statesman (1971)
- Thomas Edison (1977)
- Henri Farman (1974)
- Camille Guérin, scientist (1972)
- Edward Jenner (1973)
- Robert Koch (1973)
- Guglielmo Marconi (1974)
- Michelangelo (1975)
- Molière (1973)
- Louis Pasteur, scientist (1972)
- Wilhelm Röntgen (1973)
- Alessandro Volta (1977)

== Djibouti ==
This list is complete through 1998.

- Hassan Gouled Aptidon, president (1978)
- Robert Baden-Powell (1982)
- Alexander Graham Bell (1977, as an overprint on a stamp of the French Territory of the Afars and Issas)
- Louis Blériot (1984)
- Charles, Prince of Wales (1981)
- Christopher Columbus, explorer (1991)
- James Cook, explorer (1980)
- Marie Curie, scientist (1984)
- Pierre Curie, scientist (1984)
- Pierre de Coubertin, Olympics founder (1987)
- Charles de Gaulle, French statesman (1990)
- Diana, Princess of Wales (1981)
- Thomas Edison (1977, as an overprint on a stamp of the French Territory of the Afars and Issas)
- Alexander Fleming, penicillin discoverer (1980)
- Yuri Gagarin (1981)
- Galileo Galilei (1984)
- Mohandas Karamchand Gandhi, Leader of India's Independence Movement (1998)
- John Glenn (1982)
- Edmond Halley, scientist (1986)
- Gerhard Armauer Hansen (1985)
- Rowland Hill, postal reformer (1979)
- Victor Hugo, novelist (1985)
- Martin Luther King ("Jr." not shown on stamp) (1983)
- Robert Koch (1982)
- Charles Lindbergh (1987)
- Samuel Morse (1987)
- Horatio Nelson, admiral (1981)
- Alfred Nobel (1983)
- Louis Pasteur, scientist (1987)
- Arthur Rimbaud, poet (1985) (1992)
- Peter Romanovsky (1980)
- Franklin D. Roosevelt (1982)
- Dick Rutan (1987)
- Friedrich Sämisch (1980)
- Alan Shepard (1981)
- George Stephenson (1981)
- Mother Teresa (1998)
- Jules Verne, writer (1980)
- Alessandro Volta (1977, as an overprint on a stamp of the French Territory of the Afars and Issas)
- Ferdinand von Zeppelin (1980)
- George Washington (1982)
- Jeana Yeager (1987)

== See also ==
- Postage stamps and postal history of Djibouti
