= List of people on the postage stamps of the German Democratic Republic =

This is a list of people on postage stamps of the German Democratic Republic, commonly known as East Germany. Note that many of these people have been featured on multiple stamps. The following entries list the name of the person, the year they were first featured on a stamp, and a short description of their notability..

See also the list of people on stamps of Germany.

This list is complete up to 1990 for all issued stamps. From 1990 onward, the stamps of the united Germany were used.

== A ==
- Ernst Abbe, physicist, entrepreneur, and social reformer (1956)
- Hermann Abendroth, conductor (1957)
- Anton Ackermann, working class movement leader (1984)
- Kurt Adams, pedagogue (1958)
- Etkar Andre, leader of German labor movement (1974)
- Georgius Agricola, scholar and mineralogist (1955)
- Dante Alighieri, Italian Poet (1965)
- Salvador Allende, president of Chile (1973)
- Julius Alpari, Hungarian Communist politician and propagandist (1962)
- André Marie Ampère, scientist (1975)
- Martha Arendsee, communist politician (1975)
- Ernst Moritz Arndt, German nationalist historian, writer and poet (1963)
- Rudi Arndt, KPD-activist (1958)
- Avicenna, Islamist astronomer, physician and writer (1952)

== B ==
- Johann Sebastian Bach, composer (1950)
- Ernst Barlach, sculptor and writer (1970)
- Bernhard Bästlein, German resistance (1964)
- Herbert Baum, German resistance (1961)
- August Bebel, socialist politician, writer and orator (1952, 1955)
- Johannes Robert Becher, politician, novelist and poet (1959)
- Artur Becker, German writer (1966)
- Johann Beckmann, author (1989)
- Ludwig van Beethoven, composer (1952)
- Hans Beimler (politician), politician (1966)
- Pavel Belyayev, cosmonaut (1965)
- Olga Benario-Prestes, communist militant (1959)
- Kurt Biedermann, kayaker (1963)
- Boleslaw Bierut, president of Poland (1951)
- René Blieck, Belgian poet (1962)
- Gebhard Leberecht von Blücher, general (1953)
- Walter Bohne, runner (1963)
- Simon Bolivar, South American liberator (1983)
- Johannes Brahms, composer (1983)
- Louis Braille, inventor of Braille writing system (1975)
- Bertolt Brecht, playwright (1957)
- Willi Bredel, writer (1971)
- Alfred Brehm, zoologist (1989)
- Christian Brehm, zoologist (1989)
- Rudolf Breitscheid, politician (1957)
- Lorenz Breunig, German resistance (1960)
- Theodor Brugsch, German internist and politician (1978)
- Georg Büchner, German dramatist (1963)
- Otto Buchwitz, working class movement leader (1979)
- Kurt Bürger, leader of German labor movement (1974)
- Pavel Bykov, Russian engineer (1951)
- Valeri Bykovski, cosmonaut (1963)

== C ==
- Amilcar Cabral, Guinea-Bissau freedom leader (1978)
- Danielle Casanova, French communist and member of the French Resistance (1962)
- Cervi Brothers, Italian anti-fascists (1962)
- Adelbert V. Chamisso, botanist (1981)
- Jakub Bart Cisinsky, poet (1956)
- Carl von Clausewitz, Prussian major-general (1980)
- Lucas Cranach, painter (1953)
- Comenius, Moravian philosopher, pedagogue and theologian (1958)
- Nicolaus Copernicus, mathematician and astronomer (1973 )
- Hans Coppi, German resistance (1961)
- Hilde Coppi, German resistance (1961)
- Luis Corvalan, Chilean politician (1973)
- Pierre de Coubertin, founder of the modern Olympics (1963)
- Frédéric Joliot-Curie, French physicist (1964)
- Marie Curie, physicist (1967)

== D ==
- Franz Dahlem, working class movement leader (1983)
- Charles Darwin, scientist (1958)
- Richard Dedekind, mathematician (1981)
- Philipp Dengel, working class movement leader (1979)
- José Diaz, Spanish politician (1962)
- Johannes Dieckmann, president of the People’s Chamber (1973)
- Friedrich Diesterweg, educator (1990)
- Joseph Dietzgen, philosopher (1978)
- Johann Wolfgang Dobereiner, chemist (1980)
- Alfred Döblin, novelist (1978)
- Henri Dunant, Red Cross founder (1957)
- Hermann Duncker, leader of German labor movement (1974)
- Albrecht Dürer, painter (1971)
- Feliks E. Dzerzhinski, head or Russian Secret Police (1977)

== E ==
- Friedrich Ebert, working class movement leader (1984)
- Werner Eggerath, labour leader (1980)
- Joseph von Eichendorff, poet (1988)
- Albert Einstein, theoretical physicist (1979)
- Charlotte Eisenblätter, German resistance (1959)
- Elvira Eisenschneider, German resistance (1961)
- Gerhart Eisler, labour leader (1977)
- Hanns Eisler, composer (1968)
- Friedrich Engels, socialist (1952, 1953, 1955)
- Lothar Erdmann, German resistance (1960)
- Leonhard Euler, mathematician (1950, 1957)

== F ==
- Max Fechner, working class leader (1982)
- Lion Feuchtwanger, novelist (1974)
- Pawel Finder, Polish Communist leader (1962)
- Wilhelm Florin, leader of German labor movement (1974)
- Theodor Fontane, writer (1969)
- Georg Forster, naturalist, ethnologist, travel writer, journalist, and revolutionary (1979)
- Leonhard Frank, writer (1971)
- Caspar David Friedrich, painter (1974)
- Friedrich Fröbel, educator (1957)
- August Frölich, labour leader (1977)
- Julius Fučík (journalist), Czechoslovak journalist and Nazi resistance (1962)

== G ==
- Fritz Gabler, working class movement leader (1987)
- Yuri Gagarin, cosmonaut (1963)
- Indira Gandhi, Prime Minister of India (1986)
- Carl Friedrich Gauss, mathematician (1977)
- August von Gneisenau, Prussian field marshal (1960)
- Johann Wolfgang von Goethe, German poet, playwright, novelist, scientist, and statesman (1973)
- Nikolai Gogol, writer (1952)
- Maxim Gorky, writer (1953)
- Johann Gottlieb, philosopher (1962)
- Klement Gottwald, Czech leader (1952)
- Albrecht von Graefe, Prussian pioneer of German ophthalmology (1978)
- Ottomar Greschke, working class leader (1982)
- Wilhelm Griesinger, German neurologist (1960)
- Jacob Grimm, writer and philologist (1950, 1975)
- Wilhelm Grimm, writer and philologist (1975)
- Fritz Grosse, working class movement leader (1984)
- Maria Großmuss, German resistance (1959)
- Otto Grotewohl, prime minister (1965)
- Ernst Grube, German politician (1963)
- Otto von Guericke, physicist (1977)
- Hanno Gunther, German resistance (1961)
- Johann Gutenberg, printer and developer of movable type (1970)

== H ==
- Otto Hahn, physicist (1979)
- George Handel, composer (1952, 1959)
- Georg Handke, leader of German labor movement (1974)
- Adolf von Harnack, German theologian (1950)
- Arvid Harnack, German resistance (1983)
- Mildred Harnack, German resistance (1983)
- Gerhart Hauptmann, playwright (1952)
- John Heartfield, German visual artist (1971)
- Friedrich Hebbel, German dramatist (1963)
- Fritz Heckert, German politician (1968)
- G. W. F. Hegel, philosopher (1952)
- Heinrich Heine, poet (1956)
- Samuel Heinicke, educator (1978)
- Hermann von Helmholtz, German physicist (1950)
- Johann Gottfried Herder, philosopher (1974)
- Liselotte Herrmann, German resistance (1961)
- Gustav Hertz, physicist (1977)
- Heinrich Hertz, physicist (1957)
- Georg Herwegh, poet (1967)
- Friedrich Hölderlin, poet (1970)
- Lambert Horn, German resistance (1960)
- David Edward Hughes, British-American inventor, practical experimenter, and professor of music (1990)
- Victor Hugo, writer (1952)
- Alexander von Humboldt, naturalist, traveler and statesman (1950, 1959)
- Wilhelm von Humboldt, Prussian philosopher (1950)
- Ulrich von Hutten, promulgator of the Lutheran movement (1988)

== I ==
There are no persons with surnames starting with “I” on the postage stamps of the German Democratic Republic.

== J ==
- Franz Jacob (Resistance fighter), German resistance (1964)
- Friedrich Ludwig Jahn, politician (1952)
- Sigmund Jähn, German cosmonaut (1986)
- Joachim Jungius, mathematician (1957)

== K ==
- Hans Kahle, German journalist (1966)
- Immanuel Kant, philosopher (1974)
- Friedrich August Kekulé, German organic chemist (1979)
- Johannes Kepler, astronomer (1971)
- Gustav Robert Kirchhoff, German physicist (1974)
- Egon Erwin Kisch, journalist (1985)
- Alfred Klahr, Austrian politician (1962)
- Heinrich von Kleist, poet and playwright (1953)
- Tilde Klose, German resistance (1959)
- Georg Wenzeslaus von Knobelsdorff, architect (1953)
- Albin Köbis, German sailor (1967)
- Robert Koch, German physician and microbiologist (1960)
- K. A. Kocor, composer (1971)
- Bernard Koenen, working class movement leader (1979)
- Wilhelm Koenen, labour leader (1976)
- Jan Amos Komensky, teacher (1958)
- Käthe Kollwitz, German artist (1952)
- Zoya Kosmodemyanskaya, Soviet partisan (1962)
- Nikita Khrushchev, Russian leader (1964)
- Werner Kube, German resistance (1961)
- Adam Kuckhoff, German writer, journalist, and German resistance member (1964)
- Albert Kuntz, KPD-activist (1958)
- Mikhail Kutuzov, Russian field marshal (1963)
- Wilhelm Külz, politician (1965)
- Alfred Kurella, working class movement leader (1984)

== L ==
- Max Lademann, German resistance (1960)
- Karl Landsteiner, doctor (1968)
- Emanuel Lasker, chess champion (1968)
- Max von Laue, physicist (1979)
- Helmut Lehmann, working class leader (1982)
- Vladimir Lenin, premier of the Soviet Union (1960)
- Alexei Leonov, cosmonaut (1965)
- Gotthold Ephraim Lessing, writer and dramatist (1954, 1979)
- Bruno Leuschner, labour leader (1990)
- Louis Lewandowski, composer (1990)
- Justis von Liebig, German scientist (1978)
- Karl Liebknecht, German politician (1951, 1955, 1959, 1966, 1978)
- Wilhelm Liebknecht, political figure (1955, 1975)
- Gottfried von Leibniz, philosopher (1950)
- Hertha Lindner, German resistance (1961)
- K. A. Lingner, entrepreneur and philanthropist (1987)
- Carl von Linné, Swedish botanist, zoologist, taxonomist, and physician (1958)
- Georg List, industrialist and economist (1989)
- Franz Liszt, composer (1973)
- Hans Loch, chairman of the Liberal Democratic Party (1978)
- Albert Lortzing, composer (1952)
- Margarete Luther, mother of Martin Luther (1972)
- Martin Luther, priest (1982)
- Rosa Luxemburg, philosopher (1955, 1959)

== M ==
- Heinrich Mann, novelist (1971)
- Thomas Mann, novelist (1956)
- Hans Marchwitza, German writer (1966)
- Karl Maron, working class movement leader (1983)
- Karl Marx, economist (1952, 1953, 1955)
- Hermann Matern, vice-president of the DDR (1973)
- Rudolf Mauersberger, German conductor (1989)
- Franz Mehring, German historian (1955)
- Philipp Melanchthon, theologian (1971)
- Adolph von Menzel, painter and graphic artist (1965)
- Felix Mendelssohn, composer (1984)
- Paul Merker, leader of German labor movement (1974)
- Ernst Meyer, labour leader (1977)
- Michelangelo, Italian painter and sculptor (1973)
- Josef Miller, working class movement leader (1983)
- Ho Chi Minh, North Vietnam leader (1970)
- Carl Moltmann, leader of German labor movement (1974)
- Theodor Mommsen, historian (1950)
- Wolfgang Amadeus Mozart, composer (1956)
- Thomas Müntzer, Protestant theologian, rebel leader (1953)

== N ==
- Otto Nagel, painter (1969)
- Johann Friedrich Naumann, ornithologist (1980)
- Jawaharlal Nehru, Prime Minister of India (1989)
- Walther Nernst, scientist (1950)
- Pablo Neruda, Chilean poet (1974)
- Theodor Neubauer, fighter against fascism (1970)
- F. Caroline Neuber, actress (1971)
- Balthasar Neumann, architect (1953)
- Martin Andersen Nexö, Danish writer (1969)
- Käthe Niederkirchner, German resistance (1959)
- Andrian G. Nikolayev, cosmonaut (1962)
- Albert Norden, working class movement leader (1984)
- Otto Nuschke, politician and vice president (1958)

== O ==
- Fred Oelsser, working class movement leader (1983)
- Carl von Ossietzky, German journalist and pacifist (1964)
- Hans Otto, actor (1975)

== P ==
- Max von Pettenkofer, hygienist (1968)
- Wilhelm Pieck, president of the DDR (1950, 1953, 1954, 1958, 1959, 1960)
- Max Planck, physicist (1950, 1958)
- Pope John Paul II, pope (1990)
- Pavel R. Popovich, cosmonaut (1962)
- Magnus Poser, fighter against fascism (1970)
- Eugene Pottier, writer (1963)

== Q ==
There are no persons with surnames starting with “Q” on the postage stamps of the German Democratic Republic.

== R ==
- Wilhelm Raabe, writer (1981)
- Siegfried Radel, working class movement leader (1983)
- Guenther Ramin, musician (1957)
- Heinrich Rau, politician (1966, 1976, 1979)
- Max Reger, composer (1973)
- Max Reichpietsch, German sailor (1967)
- Max Reinhardt, Austrian theatrical director (1973)
- Philipp Reis, physicist (1990)
- Ludwig Renn, writer (1990)
- Rudolf Renner, journalist (1958)
- Fritz Reuter, writer (1954)
- Albert Richter, bicyclist (1963)
- Paul Robeson, singer (1983)
- Wilhelm Conrad Roentgen, physicist (1965)
- Hans Rothbart, German resistance (1960)

== S ==
- Anton Saefkow, German resistance (1964)
- Gustl Sandtner, German resistance (1960)
- Johanna Jannetje Schaft, Dutch communist resistance fighter (1962)
- Gerhard von Scharnhorst, Prussian general (1963)
- Adam Scharrer, writer (1989)
- John Schehr, labour leader (1976)
- Arthur Scheunert, nutritionist (1979)
- Ferdinand von Schill, Prussian major (1953)
- Friedrich von Schiller, German poet (1955, 1959)
- Heinrich Schliemann, archeologist (1971)
- Kurt Schlosser, mountaineer (1963)
- Paul Schneider, pastor (1957)
- Ernst Schneller, German resistance (1960)
- Hans Scholl, German resistance (1961)
- Sophie Scholl, German resistance (1961)
- Otto Schön, working class movement leader (1984)
- Carlo Schönhaar, German resistance (1961)
- Otto Schott, German chemist and glass technologist (1984)
- Franz Schubert, composer (1953)
- Johann Andreas Schubert, locomotive designer (1985)
- Harro Schulze-Boysen, German resistance (1983)
- Georg Schumann, labor leader (1976)
- Robert Schumann, composer (1956)
- Heinrich Schutz, composer (1985)
- Albert Schweitzer, physician and missionary (1965)
- Werner Seelenbinder, athlete, German resistance fighter (1964)
- Rudolph Seiffert, long distance swimmer (1963)
- Ignaz Semmelweis, doctor (1968)
- Johann Gottfried Seume, German dramatist (1963)
- William Shakespeare, English playwright (1964)
- John Sieg, German resistance (1983)
- Robert Siewert, working class movement leader (1987)
- Jan Arnost Smoler, philologist (1966)
- Richard Sorge, Soviet intelligence agent (1976)
- Joseph Stalin, Soviet leader (1951, 1954)
- Heinrich Friedrich Karl Reichsfreiherr vom und zum Stein, Prussian statesman (1953)
- Heinrich von Stephan, founder of the UPU (1981)
- Heinz Steyer, soccer player (1963)
- Walter Stoecker, German politician (1958)
- Theodor Storm, writer (1967)
- Bertha von Suttner, writer (1964)

== T ==
- Georg Philipp Telemann, composer (1981)
- Valentina Tereshkova, cosmonaut (1963)
- Albrecht D. Thaer, agronomist and physician (1977)
- Ernst Thälmann, revolutionary leader (1953, 1954, 1955, 1956, 1957, 1960)
- Mathias Thesen, German resistance (1960)
- Herman Tops, gymnast (1963)
- Johannes Tralow, playwright (1972)
- Herbert Tschäpe, German resistance (1961)
- Kurt Tuchlosky, writer (1970)
- Käte Tucholla, field hockey player (1963)

== U ==
- Ludwig Uhland, poet and philologist (1987)
- Walter Ulbricht, chairman of the Council of State (1961)

== V ==
- Leonardo da Vinci, Renaissance man (1952)
- Walter Vesper, working class movement leader (1987)
- Rudolf Virchow, physician (1952, 1960)

== W ==
- Richard Wagner, composer (1963)
- Herbert Warnke, working class leader (1982)
- Carl Maria von Weber, composer (1952)
- Alfred Wegener, geophysicist and meteorologist (1980)
- Helene Weigel, actress (1980)
- Erich Weinert, poet and labour leader (1965)
- Ehm Welk, journalist (1974)
- Christoph Martin Wieland, German poet (1973)
- Johann J. Winckelmann, archeologist (1967)
- Otta Winzer, working class leader (1982)
- Erich Wirth, activist (1951)
- Friedrich Wolf, writer (1973)

== X ==
There are no persons with surnames starting with “X” on the postage stamps of the German Democratic Republic.

== Y ==
There are no persons with surnames starting with “Y” on the postage stamps of the German Democratic Republic.

== Z ==
- L. L. Zamenhof, developer of Esperanto (1987)
- Mao Zedong, Chinese leader (1951)
- Carl Zeiss, German scientific instrument maker, optician and businessman (1956)
- Clara Zetkin, advocate for women's rights (1955, 1957)
- Heinrich Zille, German illustrator, caricaturist, lithographer and photographer (1958)
- Arnold Zweig, novelist (1977)

== Sources ==
- Scott 2007 Standard Postage Stamp Catalogue Vol. 3, © 2007 Scott Publishing Co.
- Michel Briefmarken-Katalog Deutschland 1985/86, © 1985 Schwaneberger Verlag GmbH
