= List of people on the postage stamps of Peru =

This article lists people who have been featured on Peruvian postage stamps. Note that many of these people have been featured on multiple stamps. The following entries list the name of the person, a short description of their notability, and the first year they were first featured on a stamp.

The list is complete through 2021.

== A ==
- José Fernando de Abascal y Sousa, viceroy of Peru, 1806-16 (2017)
- Fernando Albujar Fayaque, national hero (1986)
- Justo Albujar Fayaque, national hero (1986)
- Ciro Alegria, journalist and politician (2009)
- Martin Enriquez de Almanza, viceroy of Peru, 1581-83 (2006)
- Felipe Pinglo Alva, composer (2007)
- Juan Velasco Alvarado, president of Peru, 1968-75 (2011)
- Yoshitaka Amano, founder of the Amano Textile Museum (2019)
- Manuel de Amat y Junyent, viceroy of Peru, 1761-76 (2011)
- Sister Ana de los Angeles Monteagudo, Peruvian nun (2006)
- José Angulo, leader of the 1814 Cuzco Rebellion (2019)
- Mariano Angulo, leader of the 1814 Cuzco Rebellion (2019)
- Vicente Angulo, leader of the 1814 Cuzco Rebellion (2019)
- José de Armendariz, viceroy of Peru, 1724-36 (2010)
- Diego Morcillo Rubio de Auñon, viceroy of Peru, 1716, 1720-24 (2010)
- Gabriel de Avilés y del Fierro, viceroy of Peru, 1801-06 (2017)

== B ==
- Jose Balta, president of Peru, 1868-72 (2011)
- Jose Pardo Barreda, president of Peru, 1904-08, 1915-19 (2011)
- Micaela Bastidas, Peruvian rebel (2006)
- Oscar R. Benavides, president of Peru, 1914-15, 1933-39 (2011)
- Pope Benedict XVI, head of the Catholic Church (2006)
- Diego de Benavides y de la Cueva, viceroy of Peru, 1661-66 (2008)
- Francisco Morales Bermudez, president of Peru, 1975-80 (2011)
- Remigio Morales Bermudez, president of Peru, 1890-94 (2011)
- Juan Bielovucic, aviator (1937)
- Guillermo Billinghurst, president of Peru, 1912-14 (2011)
- Francisco Bolognesi Cervantes, hero of the War of the Pacific (2016)
- Francisco de Borja y Aragon, viceroy of Peru, 1615-21 (2007)
- Jose Luis Bustamante y Rivero, president of Peru, 1945-48 (2011)

== C ==
- Luis Jerónimo de Cabrera, viceroy of Peru, 1629-39 (2007)
- Andres A. Caceres, president of Peru, 1886-90, 1894-95 (2011)
- Rebeca Carrión Cachot, archaeologist (2010)
- Francisco Garcia Calderon, president of Peru, 1881 (2011)
- Edwin Vásquez Cam, first Peruvian Olympic gold medalist (2008)
- Manuel Candamo, president of Peru, 1903-04 (2011)
- Carmine Nicolao Caracciolo, viceroy of Peru, 1716-20 (2010)
- Ramon Castilla, president of Peru, 1845-51, 1855-62 (2011)
- Pedro Antonio Fernandez de Castro, viceroy of Peru, 1667-72 (2008)
- Juan Bielovucic Cavalié, first airplane flight in Peru (2011)
- Luis M. Sanchez Cerro, president of Peru, 1930-33 (2011)
- Martin Chambi, photographer (2011)
- Frédéric Chopin, Polish composer and virtuoso pianist (2010)
- Diego Fernandez de Cordoba, viceroy of Peru, 1622-29 (2007)
- Juan José Crespo, hero of Peruvian independence (2017)
- Teodoro de Croix, viceroy of Peru, 1784-90 (2014)
- Javier Pérez de Cuéllar, fifth Secretary-General of the United Nations (2010)
- Baltasar de la Cueva Enriquez, viceroy of Peru, 1674-78 (2008)

== D ==
- Victor Delfin, sculptor (2007)

== E ==
- Alfredo Bryce Echenique, writer (2006)
- Jose Rufino Echenique, president of Peru, 1851-55 (2011)

== F ==
- Pancho Fierro, painter (2014)
- Justo Figuerola, president of Peru, 1843, 1844 (2011)
- Pope Francis, head of the Catholic Church (2013)
- Alberto Fujimori, president of Peru, 1990-2000 (2011)

== G ==
- Agustin Gamarra, president of Peru, 1829-33, 1839-41 (2011)
- Giuseppe Garibaldi, Italian leader (2007)
- Manuel Guarniz Lopez, national hero (1986)
- Manuel de Guirior, viceroy of Peru, 1776-80 (2011)
- Ricardo Perez Godoy, president of Peru, 1962-63 (2011)
- Diego Ladrón de Guevara Orozco y Calderon, viceroy of Peru, 1710-16 (2010)
- Luis Enriquez de Guzmán, viceroy of Peru, 1655-61 (2008)

== H ==
- Victor Raúl Haya de la Torre, politician (2007)
- Ollanta Moisés Humala Tasso, president of Peru, 2011-16 (2018)

== I ==
- Miguel Iglesias, president of Peru, 1882-85 (2011)
- Manco Inca, leader of 1536 rebellion against the Spaniards (2019)

== J ==
- Agustin de Jáuregui y Aldecoa, viceroy of Peru, 1780-84 (2014)
- Pope John XXIII, head of the Catholic Church (2014)

== K ==
- Pedro Pablo Kuczynski Godard, president of Peru, 2016-18 (2018)

== L ==
- Augusto B. Leguia, president of Peru, 1908-12, 1919-30 (2011)
- Melchor de Liñán y Cisneros, viceroy of Peru, 1678-81 (2009)
- Franz Liszt, composer (2011)
- Mario Vargas Llosa, writer (2006)
- Jerónimo de Loayza, first archbishop of Lima (2008)
- Nicolas Lindley López, president of Peru, 1963 (2011)
- Gregorio Luperón, president of Dominican Republic (2018)

== M ==
- Ernest Malinowski, builder of Ferrocarril Central Andino (2019)
- Alejandro Toledo Manrique, president of Peru, 2001-06 (2011)
- Jose de la Mar, president of Peru, 1827-29 (2011)
- Manuel Menendez, president of Peru, 1841-42, 1844-45 (2011)
- Garcia Hurtado de Mendoza, viceroy of Peru, 1590-96 (2006)
- José Antonio de Mendoza Caamano y Sotomayor, viceroy of Peru, 1736-45 (2011)
- Juan de Mendoza y Luna, viceroy of Peru, 1607-15 (2007)
- Toribio de Mogrovejo, saint and founder of first seminary in Americas (2007)
- Carlos Monge Medrano, founder of the National Institute of Andean Biology (2016)
- Lizardo Montero, president of Peru, 1881-83 (2011)
- Pedro Paulet Mostajo, aeronautical pioneer (2007)
- Wolfgang Amadeus Mozart, composer (2006)
- Sofia Mulanovich, surfer (2006)
- Gustavo Pons Muzzo, historian (2010)

== N ==
- Melchor de Navarra y Rocafull, viceroy of Peru, 1681-89 (2009)
- Manuel de Oms y de Santa Pau, viceroy of Peru, 1707-10 (2009)

== O ==
- Manuel A. Odria, president of Peru, 1948-56 (2011)
- Ambrosio O'Higgins, viceroy of Peru, 1796-1801 (2014)
- José Olaya Balandra, hero in war of independence (2014)
- Luis Jose de Orbegoso, president of Peru, 1833 (2011)

== P ==
- Valentin Paniagua, president of Peru, 2000-01 (2011)
- Manuel Pardo y Lavalle, president of Peru, 1872-76 (2011)
- Luciano Pavarotti, tenor singer (2009)
- Raul Maria Pereira, architect (2007)
- Alan Garcia Perez, president of Peru, 1985-90, 2006-11 (2011)
- Juan Antonio Pezet, president of Peru, 1863-65 (2011)
- Joaquin de la Pezuela, viceroy of Peru, 1816-21 (2017)
- Nicolas de Pierola, president of Peru, 1879-81, 1895-99 (2011)
- Manuel González Prada, literary critic (2014)
- Manuel Prado y Ugarteche, president of Peru, 1939-45, 1956-62 (2011)
- Mariano Ignacio Prado, president of Peru, 1865-68, 1876-79 (2011)
- Luis La Puerta, president of Peru, 1879 (2011)

== Q ==
- José Abelardo Quiñones Gonzales, military hero (2014)

== R ==
- Eduardo Lopez de Romana, president of Peru, 1899-1903 (2011)

== S ==
- Felipe Santiago Salaverry, president of Peru, 1835-36 (2011)
- Miguel de San Roman, president of Peru, 1862-63 (2011)
- Andres de Santa Cruz, president of Peru, 1827, 1836-38, 1829-39 (2011)
- Miguel Grau Seminario, admiral (2014)
- José de la Serna e Hinojosa, viceroy of Peru, 1821-24 (2017)
- William Shakespeare, playwright (2014)
- St. Francis Solano, Spanish friar and missionary (1995)
- Aurelio Miró Quesada Sosa, lawyer and writer (2008)
- Garcia Sarmiento de Sotomayor, viceroy of Peru, 1648-55 (2007)
- Javier Arias Stella, pathologist (2008)
- Fernando de Szyszlo, painter (2007)

== T ==
- Francisco Gil de Taboada, viceroy of Peru, 1790-96 (2014)
- Fernando Belaunde Terry, president of Peru, 1963-68, 1980-85 (2011)
- Francisco de Toledo, viceroy of Peru, 1569-81 (2006)
- Pedro de Toledo y Leiva, viceroy of Peru, 1639-48 (2007)
- Fernando Torres y Portugal, viceroy of Peru, 1584-89 (2006)
- Juan Crisostomo Torrico, president of Peru, 2001-06 (2011)
- Clorinda Matto de Turner, writer (2011)

== V ==
- Melchor Portocarrero Lasso de la Vega, viceroy of Peru, 1689-1705 (2009)
- José Antonio Manso de Velasco, viceroy of Peru, 1745-61 (2011)
- Luis de Velasco, viceroy of Peru, 1596-1604 (2007)
- Javier Pulgar Vidal, geographer (2011)
- Manuel Ignacio de Vivanco, president of Peru, 1843-44 (2011)

== Z ==
- Gaspar de Zuniga y Acevedo, viceroy of Peru, 1604-06 (2007)

== Sources ==
- 2021 Scott Standard Postage Stamp Catalogue, Vol. 5A, ©2021, Amos Media Co., Sidney, OH
- Stanley Gibbons Stamp Catalogue, Part 20, South America, 4th Edition, ©2008, Stanley Gibbons, London, UK
- Michel Übersee-Katalog Band 3: Südamerika 2001, ©2000, Schwaneberger GMBH, Munich, Germany
