= List of people on the postage stamps of Latvia =

This article contains a list of people depicted on postage stamps issued by Latvia, along with the dates of issue.

References External Links

== A ==
- Gunārs Astra - dissident, human rights activist (October 22, 2005)

== B ==
- Kārlis Baumanis - composer (May 21, 2005)
- Jānis Balodis - general, Commander of the Aizsargi units (May 12, 1932; November 18, 1938)

== Č ==
- Jānis Čakste - first president of the Republic of Latvia (December 4, 1930; August 19, 1931; April 18, 1928; November 11, 1998)
- Elīza Cauce (née Tīruma) - luger (July 3, 2014)

== D ==
- Kristiāns Johans Dāls - director of naval schools of Ainaži and Liepāja (July 20, 2002)
- Leonardo da Vinci - Italian polymath (December 7, 1932)
- Daumants Dreiškens - bobsledder (July 3, 2014)
- Martins Dukurs - skeleton sledder (July 3, 2014)

== F ==
- Hieronīms Kārlis Fridrihs Fon Minhauzens - baron and author (April 1, 2005)

== J ==
- Inese Jaunzeme - athlete (June 19, 1996)
- Jānis Pāvils II - Roman Catholic Pope (August 28, 1993; August 14, 2005)

== K ==
- Oskars Kalpaks - first Commander in Chief of Latvian Armed Forces (January 6, 2007)
- Jēkabs Ketlers - Duke of the Duchy of Courland and Semigallia (November 14, 2001)
- Miķelis Krogzems - (January 4, 1936)
- Atis Kronvalds - (January 4, 1936)
- Dainis Kūla - athlete (June 19, 1996)
- Alberts Kviesis - third president of the Republic of Latvia (December 4, 1930; August 19, 1931; November 11, 2000)

== L ==
- Jānis Lūsis - athlete (June 19, 1996)

== M ==
- Juris Māters - (January 4, 1936)
- Zenta Mauriņa - writer (May 10, 1996; January 7, 2006 (stamp on stamp))
- Zigfrīds Anna Meierovics - politician, first minister of foreign affairs (August 20, 1929)
- Oskars Melbārdis - bobsledder (July 3, 2014)

== O ==
- Elvīra Ozoliņa - athlete (June 19, 1996)

== P ==
- Andrejs Pumpurs - poet (January 4, 1936)

== R ==
- Jānis Rainis - poet, playwright, translator, politician and author (May 22, 1930)
- Mārtiņš Rubenis - luger (July 3, 2014)

== S ==
- Andris Šics - luger (July 3, 2014)
- Juris Šics - luger (July 3, 2014)
- Pauls Stradiņš - physician (January 13, 1996)
- Jānis Strenga - bobsledder (July 3, 2014)

== T ==
- Mihails Tāls - chess player (August 18, 2001)

== U ==
- Kārlis Ulmanis - fourth president of the Republic of Latvia (September 4, 1937; November 18, 1938; May 13, 1939; February 7, 2001)

== V ==
- Julijans Vaivods - Roman Catholic cardinal (August 18, 1995)
- Krišjānis Valdemārs - (November 14, 2001)
- Ēvalds Valters - actor (April 2, 1994)
- Arvis Vilkaste - bobsledder (July 3, 2014)

== Z ==
- Gustavs Zemgals - second president of the Republic of Latvia (December 4, 1930; August 19, 1931; November 16, 1999)
