= List of people on the postage stamps of Hong Kong =

This is a list of people depicted on the postage stamps of Hong Kong. British Hong Kong issued stamps from 1862 to 1999. Stamps of Hong Kong were then issued under the control of China. The date when the person depicted first appeared on stamps is listed in parentheses.

== History ==
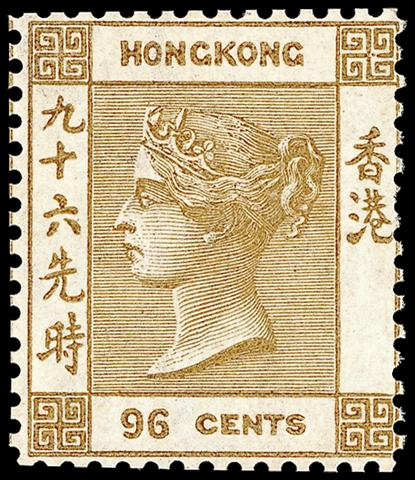
An 1862 96-cent stamp featuring Queen Victoria. One of the first seven stamps issued that year, it has the words "HONGKONG" and the Chinese characters "先時" for "cents".

Established in August 1841, the Postal Department (later renamed to Hongkong Post) on 8 December 1862 published its inaugural postage stamp featuring Queen Victoria's image, which Ferdinand Joubert did the engraving of. The department issued seven versions of the stamp. In the period between 1862 and 1935, Hong Kong published only definitive stamps and issued new stamps every time there was a new British monarch who presided over Hong Kong. The stamps featured images of the monarchs such as King Edward VII in 1903, King George V in 1912, and King George VI in 1938. The Postal Department released the first stamp featuring Queen Elizabeth II on 5 January 1954. It subsequently released four differently designed stamps with her image. In 1894, the Postal Department featured the Scottish missionary James Legge on a postage stamp, making him the first individual not from the British royal family to be shown on a stamp.

The Postal Department released commemorative stamps less frequently and in tinier batches. The commemorative stamps celebrated events and people. They used the stamps to celebrate royal events such as the Wedding of Princess Anne and Mark Phillips that featured the couple and Silver Jubilee of Elizabeth II that featured Elizabeth II. To celebrate the 1974 Hong Kong Arts Festival, they used stamps to highlight Chinese culture and attract foreigners attendees even though the festival was not exclusively focused on Chinese culture. The stamp architect selected Cantonese opera masks to appear on the stamp. Each mask had a person who was legendary or was from ancient times. The list included the mythical Monkey King, the military general Guan Yu, and the judge Bao Zheng.

In the 1980s, the Postal Department began releasing commemorative stamps featuring celebrities. In November 1995, to commemorate movie stars, Hong Kong released a collection of four stamps titled "Hong Kong Movie Stars" (Chinese: 香港影星) featuring Bruce Lee, Leung Sing Poh, Yam Kim-fai, and Lin Dai in 1995. According to the scholar Tai On Hei, "These movie stars were already household names at that time, and had even become famous overseas." The stamps' denominations were HK$1.20, HK$2.10, HK$2.60 and HK$5. Owing to the stamps' popularity, the Postal Department released a second collection of four movie star stamps in 2001, this time featuring on each stamp one male and one female movie star who had been great partners in movies. The duos were Ng Cho-fan and Yin Pak, Sun Ma Sze Tsang and Tang Bik-wan, Cheung Wood-yau and Man-lei Wong, and Mak Bing-wing and Wong-Nui Fung. The stamps' denominations were HK$1.30, HK$2.50, HK$3.10, and HK$5.00. In June 2001, the Hongkong Post issued a collection of stamps titled "My Wishes" (Chinese: 我的祝願) featuring athletes and stars from the literary and art arenas who were from mainland China, Hong Kong, and Taiwan. The goal was to support the Beijing bid for the 2008 Summer Olympics. The people featured on the stamps included Zhang Yimou, Ge You, Mao Amin, Gong Li, Yang Lan, Zhao Wei, and Zhang Ziyi. On 8 November 2005, the Hongkong Post released a set of stamps in a collection titled "Hong Kong Pop Stars" (Chinese: 香港流行歌星). It commemorated five Hong singers who had died: Danny Chan], Leslie Cheung, Anita Mui, Roman Tam, and Wong Ka Kui.

After the Handover of Hong Kong, the Hongkong Post released stamps that commemorated historical Chinese figures with significance to Hong Kong like Sun Yat-sen and Deng Xiaoping instead of current political leaders. In the first twenty years of the 21st century, Sun appeared numerous times on the stamps. The appearances included 12 November 2006 and 12 November 2016 to commemorate his 140th and 150th birthdays, respectively. Sun spent some of his formative years in Hong Kong, where he formed his revolutionary ideas that later led to the overthrow of the Qing dynasty. Deng was the leader who had proposed the one country, two systems principle of how to govern Hong Kong.

== A ==
- Anne, Princess Royal (1973)

== B ==
- Robert Baden-Powell, 1st Baron Baden-Powell (2007), a stamp containing his portrait was issued on 1 March 2007 to celebrate the centennial of his founding of the Scout Movement. Yi Dal-wing (Chinese: 易達榮) designed the stamp.
- Bao Zheng (1974)

== C ==
- Charles, Prince of Wales (1972), a stamp was published in 1981 to commemorate the wedding of Prince Charles and Lady Diana Spencer, and after their inaugural Hong Kong trip a second stamp was published in 1989 to commemorate it.
- Cai Yuanpei (2011)
- Danny Chan (2005)
- Leslie Cheung (2005)
- Cheung Wood-yau (2001), actor
- Winston Churchill (1966), the 24 January 1966 stamp showed Churchill and St Paul's Cathedral during the Second World War.

== D ==
- Deng Xiaoping (2004), a collection of two stamps was released on 22 August 2004 to celebrate the centennial of his birth.

== E ==
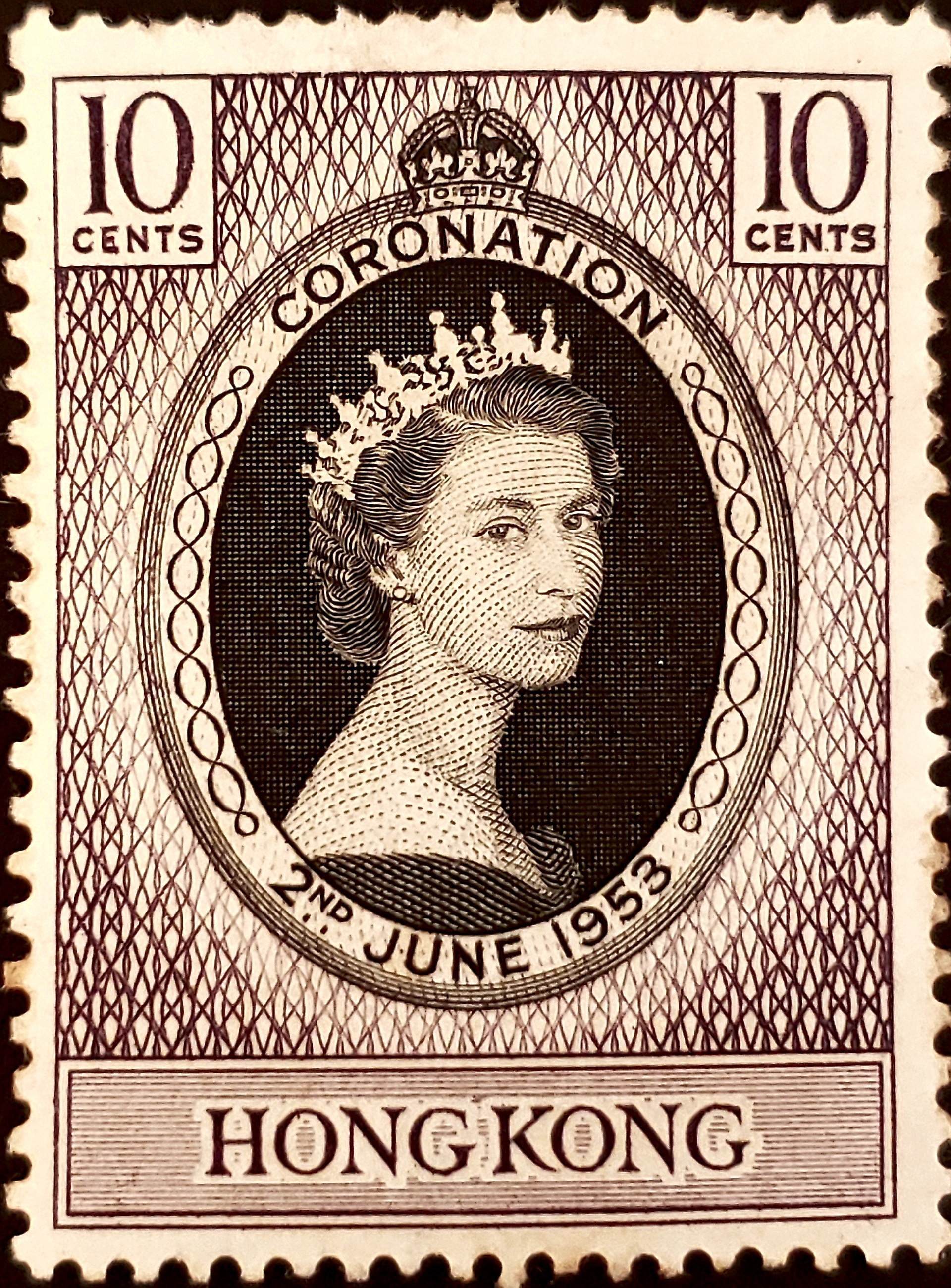
A 10-cent stamp depicting Elizabeth II at her coronation in 1953

- Edward VII (1903)
- Queen Elizabeth The Queen Mother (1937)
- Elizabeth II (1953)

== F ==
- Wong-Nui Fung (2001)

== G ==
- Ge You (2001)
- George V (1912), a stamp featuring the king was released on 6 May 1935 to commemorate his Silver Jubilee.
- George VI (1937)
- Gong Li (2001)
- Guan Yu (1974)

== H ==
- Prince Harry (1985)
- Huang Xing (2011)

== L ==
- Bruce Lee (1995)
- James Legge (1894), he was the first individual not from the British royal family to be shown on a stamp. Legge was shown on a stamp again in 1994.
- Leung Sing Poh (1995)
- Lin Dai (1995)

== M ==
- Mak Bing-wing (2001), actor
- Mao Amin (2001)
- Anita Mui (2005)

== N ==
- Ng Cho-fan (2001), actor

== P ==
- Yin Pak (2001), actress
- Prince Philip, Duke of Edinburgh (1972), a commemorative stamp was issued to celebrate the 25th anniversary of his wedding with Queen Elizabeth II. Another stamp was issued in 1975 to commemorate his visit with Elizabeth II to Hong Kong that year.
- Puankhequa (1986), merchant
- Mark Phillips (1973)

== S ==
- Diana, Princess of Wales (1981)
- Song Jiaoren (2011)
- Sun Ma Sze Tsang (2001)
- Sun Yat-sen (2006)

== T ==
- Roman Tam (2005)
- Tang Bik-wan (2001)

== V ==
- Queen Victoria (1862)

== W ==
- Prince William, Duke of Cambridge (1984)
- William the Conqueror (1935), a five-cent stamp bearing the king's stern expression and Windsor Castle was released on 6 May 1935 to commemorate the Silver Jubilee of George V.
- Wong Ka Kui (2005)
- Man-lei Wong (2001), actor

== Y ==
- Yam Kim-fai (1995)
- Yang Lan (2001)

== Z ==
- Zhang Binglin (2011)
- Zhang Yimou (2001)
- Zhang Ziyi
- Zhao Wei (2001)
- Zheng He (2005), on 28 June 2005, the Hongkong Post issued a set of stamps bearing his image to commemorate the 600th anniversary of his expedition to the West.

== Bibliography ==
- Covell, Ralph R. (1999). Anderson, Gerald H. (ed.). Biographical Dictionary of Christian Missions. Grand Rapids, Michigan: William B. Eerdmans Publishing Company. pp. 392–393. ISBN 0-8028-4680-7 – via Google Books.
- Tai, OnHei 戴安熙 (2022). "從郵票中尋找香港史的另一面" [Find another side of Hong Kong history from stamps]. 史學新秀年獎2020論文集（上）: 香港本科及碩士生史學論壇 [History Rookie Year Award 2020 Proceedings (Part 1): History Forum for Undergraduate and Postgraduate Students in Hong Kong] (in Chinese). Hong Kong: Hong Kong Young Historian Initiative. pp. 58–69. ISBN 978-988-75091-10 – via Google Books.
- Jefferies, Hugh; Matthews, Steve; de la Feuillade, Clare; Hawkins, Barbara (2012) [1978]. Stanley Gibbons Stamp Catalogue. Part 17, China (including Hong Kong, Macao, and Taiwan) (9 ed.). London: Stanley Gibbons. pp. 251–307. ISBN 978-0-85259-847-4 – via Internet Archive.
- Pang, Allan T. F. (2022-05-06). "Stamping 'Imagination and Sensibility': Objects, Culture, and Governance in Late Colonial Hong Kong". The Journal of Imperial and Commonwealth History. 50 (4): 789–816. doi:10.1080/03086534.2022.2057744. hdl:1983/6414a26b-5218-40bf-8bdf-c1cb41f7b2fb.
- Wong, May (2019). "Postage Stamps as Windows on Social Changes and Identity in Postcolonial Hong Kong". Multimodal Communication: A social semiotic approach to text and image in print and digital media. Cham: Palgrave Macmillan. pp. 55–80. doi:10.1007/978-3-030-15428-8. ISBN 978-3-030-15427-1. S2CID 155935428 – via Google Books.
