= List of people on the postage stamps of China =

This article contains a list of people who appeared on the stamps of the People's Republic of China, commonly known as China. See also Stanley Gibbons Stamp Catalogue - Part 17 China.

== History ==
Between 1949 and 1979, China's stamps featured 56 distinct people who belonged in four categories: ethical and mythical figures, revolutionary martyrs, political figures, and cultural figures. During the same time period, Taiwan had 57 distinct people on its stamps. Four people appeared on both China's stamps and Taiwan's stamps during the time period. They were Sun Yat-sen, the poets Qu Yuan and Du Fu, and Zhan Tianyou, who was the earliest Chinese railroad engineer.

On 1 December 1962, the Ministry of Posts and Telecommunications of the People's Republic of China released a set of eight stamps in its second edition of a collection titled "Ancient Chinese Scientists" (Chinese: 中国古代科学家). On 25 February 1994, the ministry published a four-stamp collection of its second edition of "Patriotic Democrats" (Chinese: 爱国民主人士). The agency issued a four-stamp collection of its second edition of "Modern Chinese Scientists" (Chinese: 中国古代科学家) on 25 May 2011. On 30 September 2014, it released a four-stamp collection titled "Patriotic Democrats" (Chinese: 爱国民主人士). The ministry published the a four-stamp collection of its seventh edition of "Modern Chinese Scientists" (Chinese: 中国现代科学家) on 8 May 2016. Xi'an Evening News noted the prevalence of centenarians appearing on the stamps.

== B ==
- Bethune, Norman (1960, 1979, 1990) Canadian Physician, Medical Innovator
- Bei Shizhang, biophysicist and academician (1994)
- Bian Que (2002) ancient physician

== C ==
- Cai Chang (2000) President of All-China Women's Federation
- Cai Hesen (2001) Communist Leader
- Cai Lun (1962) Inventor of Paper
- Cai Shengxi (2002) Military Leader
- Cai Yuanpei (1988) Educator
- Castro, Fidel (1963) President of Cuba
- Chen Geng (2005) Senior General of Liberation Army
- Chen Jingrun (1999)
- Chen Qiyou (1994) Member of United front
- Chen Shutong (1994) Vice President of People's Political Consultative Conference
- Chen Yi (1991) Military Commander, Politician
- Chen Yun (2000) Leader of the Communist Party
- Chu Coching (1988) Meteorologist, Geologist
- Confucius (1989, 2000) Thinker, Social Philosopher
- Copernicus, Nicolaus (1953) Astronomer

== D ==
- Deng Enming (2001) Communist Leader
- Deng Xiaoping (1997, 1998, 1999, 2000, 2004) Paramount Leader
- Deng Yingchao (2004) Chairwoman of the Chinese People's Political Consultative Conference
- Deng Zhongxia (2006) Communist Leader
- Ding Ying (1990) Agricultural Scientist
- Dong Biwu (1986) President
- Du Fu (1962, 1983) Poet

== E ==
- Einstein, Albert (1979) German-born Theoretical Physicist
- Engels, Friedrich (1955, 1958, 1960, 1963, 1964) German Social Scientist, Philosopher

== F ==
- Fang Zhimin (1999) Military and Political Leader

== G ==
- Gao Junyu (2006) Communist Leader
- Nicolae Grigorescu (1977)
- Gong Laifa (龔來發), farmer (1995)
- Guan Hanqing (1958) Playwright
- Guan Xiangying (2005) Military Leader
- Guo Moruo (1982) Author, Poet, Historian
- Guo Shoujing (1962) Astronomer, Engineer, Mathematician

== H ==
- Han Yu (1983) Essayist, Poet
- He Long (1986) Marshal, Vice Premier
- He Shuheng (2001) Communist Leader
- Hou Debang (1990) Chemical Engineering Expert
- Hoxha, Enver (1964) Secretary of the Albanian Party of Labour
- Hua Luogeng (1988) Mathematician
- Huang Dao Po (1980) Spinning Engineer
- Huang Gonglue (2002) Military Leader
- Huang Kecheng (2005) Senior General of Liberation Army
- Huang Xing (1986) One of the Founders of the Kuomintang
- Huang Yanpei (1993) Politician

== J ==
- Jia Sixie (1980) Agricultural Scientist
- Jianzhen (1980) Monk
- Jiao Yulu (1992) Communist Party Leader
- Jin Shanbao, agricultural educator and agronomist (2016)
- Jin Xunhua (1970) Model of Revolutionary Youth
- Joliot-Curie, Frédéric (1959) French Physicist

== K ==
- Koch, Robert (1982) German Physician
- Kotnis, Dwarkanath (1982) Indian Physician

== L ==
- Lei Feng (1978) Soldier
- Lenin, Vladimir (1953, 1954, 1955, 1957, 1959, 1960, 1962, 1964, 1965, 1980) Leader of the October Revolution, Head of the Soviet Union, Theorist of Marxism–Leninism
- Li Bai (1983) Poet
- Li Bing (1980) Water Conservancy Expert
- Li Dazhao (1989) Communist
- Li Fuchun (1990, 2000) Vice President
- Li Jishen (1993) Millitaly Commander of Kuomintang
- Li Lisan (1999) Leader of the Communist Party
- Li Shizhen (1955) Physician, Pharmacologist
- Li Siguang (1988) Geomechanician
- Li Weihan (1986) Communist Party Leader
- Lian Xi (2006) Forestrist
- Liang Sicheng (1992) Architect
- Liao Chengzhi (1988) Communist Party Leader
- Liao Zhongkai (1987) Kuomintang Leader, Financier
- Lin Biao (1967) Military Leader
- Lin Boqu (1986) Communist Party Leader
- Lin Qiaozhi (1990) Physician
- Lin Zexu (1985) Scholar, Official
- Liu Bocheng (1992) Military Commander
- Liu Hui (2002) Mathematician
- Liu Hulan, a spy for the Chinese Communist Party whom the Kuomintang executed. On 30 January 1977, 30 years after she was killed, China released a set of three stamps bearing her image.
- Liu Shaoqi (1983, 1998) President
- Liu Yingjun (1967) Soldier
- Liu Zhidan (2002) Military Commander
- Liu Zongyuan (1983) Writer
- Lu Xun (1951, 1962, 1966, 1976, 1981), writer
- Lu Yu (1997) Author of The Classic of Tea
- Luo Binghui (2005) Military Leader
- Luo Ronghuan (1992) Military Leader
- Luo Ruiqing (2005) Senior General of Liberation Army

== M ==
- Ma Xulun (1994) Educator
- Mao Dun (1986) Novelist, Critic, Journalist
- Mao Yisheng (2006) Expert on Bridge Construction
- Mao Zedong (1950, 1951, 1952, 1953, 1955, 1957, 1959, 1960, 1965, 1966, 1967, 1968, 1977, 1978, 1983, 1985, 1993, 1998, 1999, 2003, 2006) the founder of the People's Republic of China. One year after he died, on 9 September 1977, China published six stamps bearing his image to pay tribute to him.
- Martí, José (1953) Poet, Writer
- Marx, Karl (1953, 1957, 1958, 1959, 1963, 1964, 1965, 1983) Prussian Philosopher, Economist
- Mei Lanfang (1962) Opera Artist
- Mencius (2000) Philosopher
- Michael the Brave (1977) Prince of Wallachia, Transylvania, Moldavia
- Mozi (2000) Philosopher

== N ==
- Nie Er (1982) Composer
- Nie Rongzhen (1999) Military Leader

== P ==
- Pablo Picasso (1950)
- Peng Dehuai (1988) Military Leader
- Peng Pai (2006) Communist Leader
- Peng Xuefeng (2005) Military Leader
- Peng Zhen (2002) Leader of the Communist Party

== Q ==
- Qiu Jin (1991) Revolutionalist of anti-Qing Empire
- Qu Qiubai (1989) Communist Party Leader, Writer, Thinker
- Qu Yuan (1953) Poet

== R ==
- Rabelais, François (1953) Writer
- Ren Bishi (1984) Communist Party Leader

== S ==
- Shen Junru (1993) President of the Supreme People's Court
- Shen Kuo (1962) Scientist, Statesman
- Smedley, Agnes (1985) American journalist, Writer
- Snow, Edgar (1985) American journalist
- Soong Ching-ling (1982, 1993) Madame Sun Yat-sen, President of the All-China Women's Federation, Honorary Chairwoman
- Song Jiaoren (1991) Political Leader
- Song Yingxing (2002) Scientist
- Stalin, Joseph (1950, 1953, 1954, 1955, 1964, 1979) General Secretary of the Communist Party of the Soviet Union's Central Committee
- Strong, Anna Louise (1985) American journalist
- Su Song (2002) Astronomer, cartographer, horologist, pharmacologist, mineralogist, zoologist, botanist, mechanical and architectural engineer
- Su Yu (2005) Senior General of Liberation Army
- Su Zhaozheng (2006) Communist Leader
- Damdin Sükhbaatar (1961)
- Sun Simiao, physician and writer (1962, 2014)
- Sun Tzu (1995) Author of The Art of War
- Sun Yat-sen (1950, 1956, 1961, 1966, 1981, 1986, 1999, 2006) Revolutionary and Political Leader

== T ==
- Tan Kah Kee (1984) Singaporean businessman
- Tan Xinpei (2005) Opera Actor, Movie Actor
- Tan Zheng (2005) Senior General of Liberation Army
- Tang Feifan (1992) Microbiologist
- Tao Xingzhi (1991) Educator
- Tao Zhu (1988) Communist Party Leader

== U ==
- Ulanhu (2006) Vice-president of China

== W ==
- Wang Hebo (2006) Communist Leader
- Wang Jiaxiang (1986) Communist Party Leader
- Wang Jinmei (2001) Communist Leader
- Wang Jinxi (1972, 1974) Worker
- Wang Shusheng (2005) Senior General of Liberation Army
- Wei Baqun (2002) Military Leader
- Wu Youxun (1988) Physical Scientist

== X ==
- Xiang Jingyu, a revolutionary whom Chairman Mao called an exemplary female leader. To commemorate International Women's Day, the ministry released two stamps on 8 March 1978 with the name "Glorious Examples for Chinese Women". Xiang's image was on one of the stamps.
- Xian Xinghai (1985) Composer
- Xiao Jinguang (2005) Senior General of Liberation Army
- Xiong Qinglai (1992) Mathematician
- Xu Beihong (1978=Painting, 1985) Painter
- Xu Deheng (1994) Leader of Jiusan Society
- Xu Guangda (2005) Senior General of Liberation Army
- Xu Guangqi (1980) Bureaucrat, Agricultural Scientist, Astronomer, Mathematician
- Xu Haidong (2005) Senior General of Liberation Army
- Xu Jishen (2001) Military Leader
- Xu Xiangqian (1991) Military Leader
- Xu Xilin (1991) Member of Guangfuhui (Restoration Society)
- Xun Zi (2000) Philosopher

== Y ==
- Yan Jici (2006) Physicist
- Yang Hucheng (1993) Military Leader
- Yang Jingyu (2005) Commander-in-chief, Political Commissar
- Yang Kaihui, the second wife of Mao Zedong. To commemorate International Women's Day, the ministry released two stamps on 8 March 1978 with the name "Glorious Examples for Chinese Women". Yang's image was on one of the stamps.
- Yang Liwei (2003) Astronaut
- Yang Zerong (1970)
- Ye Jianying (1987) General, The Chairman of the Standing Committee of the National People's Congress
- Ye Ting (1996) Military Leader
- Yi Xing (1955) Astronomer, Mathematician

== Z ==
- Zhang Lan (1993) President of China Democratic League
- Zhang Xiaoqian (1992) Physician
- Zhang Yunyi (2005) Senior General of Liberation Army
- Zetkin, Clara (1960, 1980) German Politician
- Zhan Tianyou (1961) Railroad Engineer
- Zhang Binglin (1986) Philologist
- Zhang Heng (1955) Astronomer, Mathematician
- Zhang Sui (1955)
- Zhang Wentian (1990) General Secretary of the Communist Party
- Zhang Yuzhe (1990) Astronomer
- Zheng He (2005) Mariner, Explorer, Diplomat, Fleet Admiral
- Zhao Shiyan (2001) Communist Leader
- Zhou Enlai (1977, 1998), the first Premier of the People's Republic of China. China released four stamps each bearing his image exactly one year following his death to commemorate him. On each stamp was printed the Chinese characters, "First Anniversary of the Death of the Great Leader and Teacher Chairman Mao Zedong."
- Zhou Peiyuan (2006) Physicist
- Zhu De (1952, 1957, 1977, 1986) Communist military leader, Statesman. One year after he died, on 6 July 1977, China published four stamps bearing his image to pay tribute to him.
- Zhu Yuan (1953)
- Zhuangzi (2000) Philosopher
- Nikolai? Zhukov (1958)
- Zuo Quan (2005) Military Leader
- Zou Taofen (1985) Editor
- Zu Chongzhi (1955) Mathematician, Astronomer

== Bibliography ==
- Huang, Yu-Chin (2007). National identity and ideology in the design of postage stamps of China and Taiwan 1949-1979 (PhD). University of London. pp. 229–250. Archived from the original on 2022-06-15 – via E-Theses Online Service.
- Postage Stamp Catalogue of the People's Republic of China, 1949–1980. Beijing: The Publishing House of the People's Posts and Telecommunications. 1982 – via Internet Archive.
- Postage Stamps of the People's Republic of China (1977–1980). Beijing. 1983 – via Internet Archive.
