= Tang Ti-sheng =

Chinese opera playwright (1917–1959)

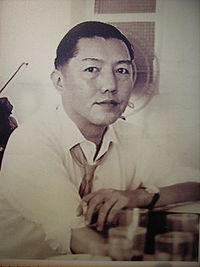
- Tang Ti-sheng in 1959 or before
- Born: Tang Kang-nien (唐康年); June 18, 1917; Heilongjiang Province, Republic of China
- Died: September 15, 1959 (aged 42); British Hong Kong
- Other names: Tong Tik-sang; Dickson Tong Tik-sang; Tang Disheng
- Spouses: Sit Gok Ching (m. 1938; div. 1942) Cheng Meng-har (m. 1942; died 1959)

Chinese name
- Traditional Chinese: 唐滌生
- Simplified Chinese: 唐涤生
Transcriptions
Yue: Cantonese
- Jyutping: Tong4 Dik6 Sang1

Tang Ti-sheng (Chinese: 唐滌生; pinyin: Táng Díshēng) (18 June 1917 – 15 September 1959), also known as Dickson Tong Tik-sang, born Tang Kang-nien (Chinese: 唐康年; pinyin: Táng Kāngnián), was a Cantonese opera playwright, scriptwriter, and film director. His contributions to Cantonese opera significantly influenced Hong Kong's reform and development of the genre beginning in the late 1930s.

During his twenty-year career, Tang composed over 400 operas and achieved immense popularity within the Cantonese opera scene. He also wrote the film scripts adapted from his own operas, directed the movies and at times acted in them himself.

He collapsed in the Lee Theatre and died later of intracerebral hemorrhage in St. Paul's Hospital (Hong Kong). He was survived by his second wife (鄭孟霞 of 17 years), their two daughters (唐淑珠、唐淑儀) and two more children (son 唐寶堯 and daughter 唐淑嫻 by his first wife 薛覺清 of five years). A fifth (irrespective of age) child Cheng mentioned in a 1989 interview, after the passing of Yam Kim Fai, is not listed on Tang's headstone.

== Early life ==
(Note: Short of talking to all the deceased and Tang directly, a recording of 36 hours public radio show, in Cantonese, in Hong Kong became the only single source of reliable, trustworthy and authentic first hand information of Tang's life and death.; Publications from before and since his death in terms of press reports are few and far between until the 1980s.; His wife's performances on TV or silver screens were the only images in public domain where she was not often known as Mrs. Tang.; In 1985-6, 30 episodes of Tang Ti-sheng's Art "唐滌生的藝術" - a comprehensive look of Tang's work and life.; In 1989, the 30th anniversary of Tang's passing, 6 episodes of Interviews with those around Tang "唐滌生藝術迴響" including Tang's wife.; 1. 王粵生 (1919–1989) Wong Yue Sang - 25 August 1989 episode and #13 of #30 in 1985-6; 2. 鍾雲山 (1919–2012) Zhong Wan San or Zhong Yuan Sun - 15 September 1989 episode; 3. 劉兆榮 (1923–2001) Lau Siu Wing - 15 September 1989 episode; 4. 靳永棠 (?–2004) Kan Wing Tong - 1 September 1989 episode; 5. 黎浪然 (?–2007) Langran Li - 1 September 1989 episode; 6. 鄭孟霞 (1913–2000) Cheng Meng-har - 11 August 1989 episode and #1 of #30 in 1985-6; 7. 鄧碧雲 (1924–1991) Tang Pik-wan - #7 of #30 in 1985-6; 8. 吳君麗 (1933–2018) Ng Kwun Lai at the Hong Kong Movie Database - #20 of #30 in 1985-6; 9. 梁山人 (?-?) Leung Shan-yan at the Hong Kong Movie Database - 25 August 1989 episode; 10. 吳楚帆 (1910-1993) Ng Cho-fan at the Hong Kong Movie Database - 18 August 1989 episode; 11. 李 鐵 (1913–1996) Lee Tit - 18 August 1989 episode; and many more not included here.)Tang was born in Heilongjiang province, northeastern China. Upon graduating from the Guangdong Sun Yat-sen Memorial Middle School, Tang reportedly attended the Shanghai Fine Arts School and also the Shanghai Baptist College. With the outbreak of the Second Sino-Japanese War, Tang fled south to Hong Kong in 1937 where he joined the Kok Sin Sing Opera Troupe (覺先聲粵劇團) led by his double (cousin) in-law and one of the "Four Super Stars" Sit Gok Sin (薛覺先). His first wife was the tenth sister (Sit Gok Ching, 薛覺清) of Sit while Sit was married to his paternal first cousin (唐雪卿). Tang worked as a copyist and assistant to Fung Chi-fen (馮志芬) and Nam Hoi Sup-sam Long (南海十三郎), two famous writers for the troupe.

Encouraged by Sit Gok Sin, Tang began his career as a playwright in 1938 with his first (being taken as an announcement of his intention to be in the arena) opera The Consoling Lotus of Jiangcheng (Chinese: 江城解語花; pinyin: jiang^{1} cheng^{2} jie^{3} yu^{3} hua^{1}; Jyutping: gong^{1} sing^{4} gaai^{2} jyu^{5} faa^{1}). Throughout the next twenty years Tang wrote a total of 446 opera scripts, while 80 of those were adapted for films.

During the Japanese occupation of Hong Kong, Tang penned many scripts for his wife and her co-stars to stage in return for food (mostly rice) and found his footing eventually.^{#2 of #30}Leaped into fame with the script White Poplar, Red Tears (Chinese: 白楊紅淚; pinyin: bai^{2} yang^{2} hong^{2} lei^{4}; Jyutping: baak^{6} joeng^{4} hung^{4} leoi^{6}) that Yam Kim Fai found worth "giving it a try" when script was short in supply.

It was first staged by the New Voice Opera Troupe of Yam and then adapted for a film (released 5 March 1950) starring Tang's close personal friend Luo Pinchao. Yam also released a vocal recording of the theme song with a well-known vocalist as the female lead.

In total, Tang directed nine films and acted in four of them. His first script for film production was The Tolling Bell (1940) with the help of Ng Cho-fan who in 1989 described how sick Tang looked the afternoon before collapsing in the Lee Theatre.

== Career ==
Tang started out as in-law of the Sit household. Tang's rise from modesty to greatness went through a process generally taken to have three stages of remarkable improvements.

=== Initial stage ===
^{Ng Cho-fan}Upon the divorce in 1941/2, Tang started working mostly with Chan Kam Tong (1906-1981) (陳錦棠) to make ends meet. Chan, the first student of Sit, voted as champion among young warriors by the audience in the 1950s, is on record his most frequent customer. There is only one title Red Silk Shoes and The Murder, with no fighting scene at all, Tang wrote for Chan in 1957 is still popular today.

=== Intermediate stage ===
The end of Second Sino-Japanese War started the busiest decade, until films took over, of the 1900s in Hong Kong and SE Asia as a whole for Cantonese opera. When Tang's work still had plenty of room for improvement, the vocal performances (and fighting scenes which were few and far between in Tang's work) made a big difference. His preference to work with, actresses as female leads over top-billed male leads, were Fong and Hung. His archrival was husband of an actress who is famous for mostly fighting scenes although she was also known by fellow performers as great old-school vocalist as Lady White Snake. Fong and Hung vocal styles were both new creations at the time. The two camps each had a usual venue on opposite side of the HK harbor.

Tang worked with musicians/composers below (See § External links.) regularly in the 1950s. Only some names are available in English. Except the Chu brothers and those who had already died, they talked about Tang on radio shows in the 1980s.

1. 王粵生 (1919–1989) Wong Yue Sang
2. 林兆鎏 (1917–1979) Lam Siu Lau
3. 吳一嘯 (Note: 「曲聖」王心帆、「曲王」吳一嘯和「曲帝」胡文森等。) (1906–1964) Ng Yat Siu
4. 朱毅剛 (1922–1981) Chu Ngai Kong, brothers
5. 朱兆祥 (1926–1986) Chu Siu Cheung, brothers
6. 劉兆榮 (1923–2001) Lau Siu Wing
7. 黎浪然 (?–2007) Langran Li (Li was the family name)
8. 靳永棠 (?–2004) Kan Wing Tong

On 25 August 1989, months before Wong Yue Sang (王粵生) (8 January 1919 – 12 December 1989) died, Mr. Wong talked about his experience working with Tang onradio show (唐滌生藝術迴響). Tang's collaboration with Mr. Wong created theme songs that were instant hits at debut on stage. One example was the Hung Sin Nui December 1951 hit Red Candle Tears (紅燭淚).^{#6 of #30}Lyrics that Tang wrote before (instead of after) Mr. Wong came up with the musical score.

Fong Yim Fun, of Sun Yim Yeung Opera Troupe, was the other actress known for, inter alia, holding her own court with vocal performances, on stage throughout the 1950s. She worked with Tang until she retired around the time Tang died.

These two “little palace maids” (一對小宮燈) of the Shing Sou Lin Opera Troupe (勝壽年粵劇團), Fong (濃茶 strong tea) and Hung (醇酒 fine wine), vocal styles dominate the Cantonese opera world since the early 1950s, with Hung mostly to the north of Hong Kong while Fong in Hong Kong and overseas until Hung visited Hong Kong in 1980 again since her departure in 1955. Hung presented the second Mrs. Tang (Cheng Meng-har, 鄭孟霞) (Note: Chor Fung Ming Opera Troupe Production (雛鳳鳴劇團製作), Hong Kong City Hall, A Retrospective of Tang Disheng's Works presented by the Urban Council, 28 December 1989 through 1 January 1990: Special Consultant: Mdm. Cheng Meng-har (鄭孟霞女士); Consultants: Mr. Wong Yuet-sang (王粵生), Dr. Leung Pui-kam (梁沛錦博士) and Mr. Yip Siu-tak) the trophy for Golden Needle Award of RTHK Top Ten Chinese Gold Songs Award 1986 (posthumous).

The Immortal Zhang Yuqiao (the Most Respectable Courtesan) (萬世流芳張玉喬)^{#11 of #30}was a milestone in his career when he was asked to help an academic Jian Youwen (簡又文教授) in 1954 for the Sun Yim Yeung Troupe. The brutal blow to Tang's ego resulted in the first sign of enlightenment, better crafted lines spoken by the husband Cai Yong (蔡伯喈) in ending scene of The Story of the Lute in early 1956.

The Summer Snow (see The Injustice to Dou E)^{#17 of #30} is the last hit collaboration of Fong/Tang and Yam Kim Fai while Hung and Yam stopped sharing the stage much earlier in 1953.

His scripts, albeit monolithically Mandarin and Butterfly 鴛鴦蝴蝶派, gradually matured to making the performers (戲擔人) successful instead of relying on the performers (人擔戲) to make his scripts successful.

=== Final stage ===
Tang, in and out of hospital for his heart problem, was rumored to be mixing alcohol with coffee as he encountered writer's block in these four years. Mind over heart? Or heart over mind? He hurried to throw in the kitchen sink. One reason could be that linchpin Yam Kim Fai, after more than 30 years, was ready to quit stage performance entirely especially after some surgeries in the 1950s. That is, make or break, time for last call.

Tang only worked with those he found worthwhile to spend time and effort on. For example, vocalist Tam Lan Hing (譚蘭卿), whose physique was same as the first Mrs. Tang, was never on Tang's radar.

At this stage, Tang immersed himself in work to create "the perfect (smart, beautiful, educated,...) female lead for the male lead to dive head first for" roles for only his favorite few actresses. Audience was led to admire, respect, love, .., pity, feel sorry for the noble/honorable female characters he wrote. What's leftover for the male lead to make do with gave them very few "roles of a lifetime". In 1990, one columnist wondered why ladies in the audience would be hooked to the male lead character and eventually also to the performer personally.

==== Influenced by Cheng Meng-har ====
Born to a Chinese father and a Japanese mother, Cheng Meng-har was an accomplished Chinese opera performer (in Shanghai, China) long before Tang started diving into some of his most famous career choices.An ‘’in Cantonese’’ only radio show had a complete account of Tang's life and work, from birth to death. Other thanpersonal hygiene (taking a bath or not), lifestyle and family, major contributions in several aspects the second Mrs. Tang made are:-

Generally

- Scripts

- before 1954
Stage craft in the form of Patterned Performance Segments (排場). (That is, the essential training for performers when only the plots were provided. Well-established before complete scripts were ever written for performers.)
- since 1954
1. Intellectual appeal improved
2. More sophisticated, less slapstick
3. Drawn from Chinese classics and poetry that they found in junk yards

- Contacts
1. Instead of travelling like Hung and Sit had to, Cantonese opera performers were introduced to assorted Chinese opera performers in Hong Kong by Cheng.
2. Ma Lianliang was in Hong Kong briefly and met with Lang Chi Bak who talked about the occasion in 1986 on radio.
3. Others, particularly those Mei Lanfang related, stayed behind and were fully engaged for decades as tutors and mentors.
- Costume

Hand-embroidered (Su Xiu, Suzhou embroidery crafted in areas around Suzhou, Jiangsu Province) instead of shimmering Sequin

Title specific (Note: This skill is lost since the debut from all female leads.)

- Mistake at the Flower Festival

Beijing-style acrobatics in shoe-making scene

- The Reincarnation of a Beauty

Ghost-walking acrobatics (rigor mortis state of human body projected) after breaking out of the coffin in rescue the scholar scene

==== Roles as mid to late teens ====
In 1959, Yam edited as she saw fit when she chaired the script-review sessions with six pillars and Tang at the table. Photograph recorded this scene with Lam Kar Sing in it.

The audience laughed out loud when a female lead delivered her line about her character being 15/16 years old only in some of the biggest stage productions in 2000s Hong Kong. The costume design, bag lady in high price fabric, did not provide the kind of support needed to fight gravity and therefore did not help either. For male leads, the lack of precision about age generally makes it less offensive to audience when actors (actresses mind their figures more) in those male lead roles show their pot belly on stage if they still have all the other essential qualities such as good vocal performances.

While Tang had some difficulties before finding his footing, he wrote and published his life's work relatively quickly (compared to Alexandre Dumas, père and Alexandre Dumas, fils). Those titles now represent Tang in Cantonese opera. He understood the limit of imagination of audience to follow his desire, which was see the female lead as irresistible, with the male lead supporting the desire.

The 1956 Pan^{4} Hing^{1} (顰卿) was not a success to say the least. As such, what did not happen was the film Dream of Red Chamber (Note: 興友影業公司《紅樓夢》電影: 1. 花氣襲人; 2. 晴雯補裘; 3. 賈政罪子; 4. 黛玉葬花; 5. 金玉良緣; 6. 黛玉歸天; 7. 寶玉哭靈) directed by Lau Hak Suen and produced by a new production company (興友影業公司), with Yam as Jia Baoyu along with:-

- Lau Hak Suen
- Poon Yat On
- Yam Bing Yee
- Pak Bik (白碧)
- Fung Wong Leui
- Mui Yee (梅綺, 1922–1966), 1956 original cast for Xue Baochai.

^{#18 of #30}Notwithstanding the excellent track record of such a classic novel, Tang's 1956 The Dream of the Red Chamber did not register with the audience even though the male lead, Yam Kim Fai (Yam), had been very well-received (Note: 【細說任龍雛】梨園客/王心帆(顧問): 1. 第148頁 1944版「翻生」賈寶玉，叫好又叫座。; 2. 第157頁 1983版「劇本沉悶」，但連演20場，賣座頗好。) for over a decade as Jia Baoyu already since the debut of another version of same title in Macau. In 1964, Yam basically put Loong up against Xu Yulan (27 December 1921 – 19 April 2017), the then contemporary best known Jia Baoyu from a 1962 Chinese opera film, having her student with only a year of training to debut as such character. The 1983 version with Loong Kim Sang (Loong) as the male lead has also been very well received.

Without cult of personality, Yam became known as Hei Mai Ching Yan (theatre fans' lover) under such circumstances. In 1959, Yam was photographed with a pen in hand reviewing Tang's last title, with the second male lead for debut, Lam Kar Sing, and Tang at the table. Yam and Loong, her successor, had demonstrated how little difference it made when they each had different co-stars in these titles known as the BIG FOUR. (A Romance of Pear Blossoms is sometimes known as one of the BIG FIVE.)

Repertoire by chronological order of debut:-

- The Peony Pavilion (1956) (see Tang Xianzu)

According to Hong Kong Movie DataBase (HKMDB), Pak Yin (Chinese: 白燕) played Du Liniang (Chinese: 杜麗娘), as the lead actress in two Cantonese films. Both historical period dramas were adapted version of this story. Tang started his own piece later in 1956.

In The Peony Pavilion (1940), Cheung Ying (Chinese: 張瑛) played the male lead Liu Mengmei (Chinese: 柳夢梅).
In Beauty Raised from the Dead (1956), set in "Late Qing Dynasty and Early Republic of China", Cheung Wood-yau (Chinese: 張活游) played the male lead Liu Mengmei (Chinese: 柳夢梅). Tang borrowed the ending plot in this film as the magical ending for his last piece in 1959.

Cheung Wood-yau worked closely with Tang and his wife in Hong Kong throughout1942 to 1945 on stage as a Cantonese opera performer. He played Jia Baoyu in a 1949 film, shortly after the war and before the era of "separation of cinema and opera" movement.
Cantonese opera as his background, first and foremost career choice, was not widely known. Neither well-known fact is he finished training school around the same time as Luo Pinchao and Lau Hak Suen, a follower of Ma Sze Tsang singing style.
With a physique very different from the beginning of his career or in 1949, he returned to his root in those few years to make quite a few operatic films with Tsi Law-lin, Mui Yee and Hung Sin Nui. These are the only record of his operatic performance.

- A Romance of Pear Blossoms (1957)

One of two (Mistake at the Flower Festival was the other one.) titles written specifically for Chinese New Year celebration season
Red for luck and fortune instead of blue or white (both mostly represent sad occasions in Chinese culture)
Only one among these five in which the male lead was front and center
First among these five to achieve recognition in terms of box-office and profitability
Saving grace for the female lead and her otherwise never existed career
Script (Act I in particular) was weak
Came back 28 years later in November 1985 with the male lead character portrayed on stage again (the audience really liked the production, total 28 sold-out performances)

- Di Nü Hua (1957)
- The Purple Hairpin (1957) (see Tang Xianzu)

At the night of tenth full house, Tang wrote how uneasy he felt.

「紫釵記連滿十晚 心神反惴惴不安 再臨隋智永千字文真書一過以養性怡情 而下筆常有仿佛之感 固知氣燥性浮 尚須勤於修養也滌生識」

At the night of 14th full house, Tang wrote how he was not himself.

「紫釵記已脫稿今演至第十四晚仍能滿座 但心神欠佳 惴惴然不知所因 臨米海嶽跋河南 摹蘭亭絹本真跡 亦有手不從心之感 誠為孫過庭書譜有言意 違勢屈焉能稱意也」

On air for the 50th anniversary of Tang's passing, Lau Tin Chi (劉天賜) commented in 2009 how "unreasonably grumpy, ill-tempered (Chinese: 狼戾; Jyutping: long^{1} lai^{2})" the debut female lead had been in this character to him.

- The Reincarnation of a Beauty (1959)

At the night of^{Ng Cho-fan}debut, Tang collapsed and died later in hospital.
Tang was under undue stress, against medical advice, while demand was high and non-stop. His hands were forced by the debut female lead who booked Lee Theatre without Tang's agreement to have this title ready.
According to Cheng Meng-har, Tang wanted to quit as a Cantonese opera playwright.
Many sudden deaths (Chinese: 猝死/暴斃) related to this title have been reported throughout the six decades since debut.

Troupe manager, Xu See (Chinese: 徐時), Hong Kong, 1979 (brother of Cantonese opera playwright Xu Ruodai, author of Dream of Red Chamber throughout the 1940s in Macau)
Composer, Chu Ngai Kong (Chinese: 朱毅剛), Singapore, 23 June 1981

Yam (in 1968) and then Loong (since 1972) took these four titles along with many other titles of Tang all around the world, including Vietnam (1972) and Las Vegas (1982). However, their reputation as iconic started in the mid-1970s. In those years since the 1970 grinding halt, Cantonese film productions in Hong Kong were few and far between. Loong and classmates were limited by design to play characters in these four only and none others, in order to boost the status of these titles of teachers. (This is very common among Yam's generation of performers. Those grew up in the 1960s in Hong Kong keep this running in full force on various platforms funded by the general public, particularly those more talented students, to promote teachers' own status.) Yam had much more under her belt beyond these but other teachers were not in the same shoes. Fame came much faster and through wider audience from cinemas than theaters.

Loong's first film as male lead was, except for Yam who made it happen, an unexpected hit. The grand plan came only since then. It started with the 1976 film Princess Chang Ping directed by John Woo and ended with the next low-budget production by director Lee Tit. Lee wanted to make The Peony Pavilion (1956) in 1975 but in vain. Being under the weather in 1976, Yam neither monitored the work of Lee nor found the result satisfactory after it was all said and done. Egoism, copyrights and profitability led to wars among studios/directors/producers/copyright-holders. Yam put an end to all related activities. Loong's loyalty to Yam (and therefore stage productions) was tested. Loong sent the offer of "HK$100,000 per film" right back to Yam. That stopped the yet-to-be-named person in his track. Director Kong Lung (龍剛) talked about his desire related to The Reincarnation of a Beauty (1959) in 1989.

Characteristics of the BIG FOUR (FIVE) are:- 1). Main characters:-

Male leads - multi-faceted but always a loyal lover
Female leads - hubris, contrary to introverted (back then generally accepted quality in a good woman) and audience did not care for her performance in the 1956 flop Dream of Red Chamber (Chinese: 紅樓夢)

2). Plot good in structure and logic

All are adaptations of existing Chinese opera stories from authors before Tang instead of his own creation.

3). Polished and well crafted lines/lyrics

Lesson learnt from Sun Yim Yeung Troupe.

4). Melodies and scores well-received

Wong Yue Sang (see #1 above) and Chu Ngai Kong (see #4 above) came up with most of the well-known pieces.
Mr. Wong Sum Fan (王心帆 1896 to August, 1992） refused to write lyrics, disliking those easy to sing modern melodies not written by the two above. (traditional versus easy for beginners, not veterans like Yam who can sing in a different way each and every time, to sing = 梆黃/小曲"易上口")

5). Glamorous setting and costumes to match

Enticing to first time theatre-goers who are not knowledgeable. Especially when compared to rags to riches of The Story of the Lute which is known as the favorite of many performers. Glamor is opposite to tradition. Chinese opera (Xìqǔ) has been relying on no more than a table and two chairs as support for travelling performers with storylines, voices and skills to hold the audience's attention. Yam, for example, has been called the prevailing performer as (落拓窮酸書生) a scholar in rags. It was believed glamorous/fancy costume, just like fancy vocal style, would have made Yam less manly.

6). Big casts

For example, Lam Kar Sing, the successor of Sit, along Leung Sing Bor and Lang Chi Bak. Most important was Yam Kim Fai as male lead exclusively on stage while Yam still worked with other co-stars in films. Why Not Return? in 1958 was also a breakthrough for Lam Kar Sing starring his first film, a Sit classic legacy title, opposite Fong (instead of a classmate). These four performers were also what some called "film distributors could take to the bank".

7). Rehearsals

Follow the Sit tradition to rehearse till confident about hitting the ground running at debut. Sit worked with many new members of his troupes for various reasons. The rehearsals became essential for these new performers to make less mistakes under the circumstances. Audience in the past, according to one veteran (Huang Junlin 黃君林), expressed their disapproval by throwing mud towards the stage.
The female lead in all those Big Four/Five is known as very immature and unable to perform well without enough rehearsals. She also was never a co-star of Sit while some of the generation after her were.
The level of maturity Yam has achieved after years of struggle is well-known. With highly accomplished and superb opera acting skills, she knows how to improvise if it should become necessary. Such a stage demeanor can only be projected by a veteran virtuoso opera performer.

8). Sing and dance butduet instead of solo

See musical theatre – Tang's solution when the female lead could neither measure up to Fong/Hung nor hold her own court with vocal performances. (For example, from the January The Story of the Lute all the way up against September The Summer Snow in 1956.) While some, LGBT or not, in the audience enjoyed the arousing singing of the female lead, some (conservatives 良家婦女) opined that noises she made were obscene.

9). Hanky-panky

Without being pornographic or scandalous, hanky-panky of some sort, of two actresses. Shippers like Natalia Chan had expressed their 360 degree fantasy such as "too bad they don't...." while two sisters had a plan for their own boy toy. Ban on actors/actresses sharing the stage was lifted about 20 years before this. The interaction on stage between actors (or actress like Yam) in male lead roles and actresses in female lead roles were very modest.

10). Happy ending (meet-date-marry-reunion in heaven if not on earth)

==== Roles as mature with life experience ====
Tang chaired the script-review sessions with the six pillars.

Ng Kwun Lai was an up-and-coming performer who just hit big with her martial agility in the breakthrough role of Leang Hung-yuk (meaning Red Jade) in How Liang Hongyu's War Drum Caused the Jin Army to Retreat (1956) when Tang was ready to help her excel as "verdant-robed girls" (qingyi). To commemorate the 30th anniversary of Tang's passing, Ng (without any successor to carry water for her) put five titles of their collaboration on stage in Hong Kong City Hall from 4 to 8 in June 1989.

The female leads, not described as particularly lovable, in these five titles go through life starting out young or already married with a son while the male leads (both primary and secondary) had major interactions between themselves. Cast for debut were all actors who could hold their own courts. No successors to those actors however spent time on these titles as Loong did for Yam's legacy titles. That may explain the relative lack of popularity compared to the BIG FOUR.

Original male lead for most of these titles was Ho Fei Fan, a well-known vocalist who held his own court and one of the very few actors who successfully portrayed Jia Baoyu. In The Blessings of the Moon, the original scene when male and female leads meet, date and get engaged has been replaced by a clean version for the male lead (a scholar) to look more decent in the minds of actors who picked up the baton since Ho. Actors of a generation (known to have extramarital affairs or as adulterers off stage), except only one recently, found such move of a hot-blooded young man, a scholar, to be scandalous. Hard to tell if a scholar's mind in the gutter or those actors' minds in the gutter was the true reason. It was confirmed to be the later in 2018 by Law Kar Ying.

== Copyright ==
In addition to the usual one time payment from Yam, Loong provided ex-gratia payments of a few thousand dollars each year for Tang's family as a friendly gesture for years. In 1990, not long since the passing of Yam,the second Mrs. Tang sold copyright of about 34 titles, mostly those Loong performed over the years, for a 6-figure sum in HK$, contrary to the gentleman's agreement Tang made with his customers regularly as a librettist. (If HK$100,000, it would be about HK$10,000 each year for the rest of her life.) In mid-1980, Loong wrote about her conflicting emotions being the lucky one carrying the torch, probably only because Tang died so young. A simple way to put it, but not her words, could be:

「生笙不識，生生不熄！」

Book deals, interviews on TV or radio, by the Press in general, academics' researches, former acquaintances, etc. became the livelihood of those, pedestrian A, not even remotely related to Tang. Instead of stealing Tang's bowl of thunder, they became known informally as something like Tang Scholars instead of successors of the sort that could come up with more decent opera scripts. In 2009, Yuen opined that Loong was the only performer of their generation could have put another librettist on the map. Unfortunately, that could have happened only if Loong were not required to stay with all the Tang's titles, good or bad, since debut as career performer. The attempts to breakthrough were resisted, in no bigger way than:

1. 1982 The Story of Emperor Li production, Loong's successful attempt to break that mold (Only Loong's second parents supported her. Luo Pinchao commented on the debut but Yam refrained from doing so and gave a cryptic response when asked by the Press. Chinese:先說:"我不識嘢的，怎可以說什麼意見呢？" 又再一次說:"沒有，我沒有話可講。") or
2. Mid-1970s rumored but failed attempt (since it would have otherwise opened to the world that can of worms) of Run Run Shaw to make a Dream of the Red Chamber film instead of what ended up in 1977 by another film production company or
3. Failed attempt to make a Farewell, My Husband film in Cantonese instead of what ended up in the 1970s.

To people around Tang beyond immediate family, they benefited from what could be exhibit A for

"...worth more dead than alive." – quote from Death of a Salesman

Fong Yim Fun appeared to be the only performer who managed her collaborations with Tang best by getting the film rights and making the films as many times as she wanted to her satisfaction. Lam Kar Sing also appeared to have learnt from Fong when he kept most of his collaborations with librettists published in his troupe's name. On the contrary, Loong was made to record CD for free for librettist in 1980 and could not get other CDs made on her own with that librettist's approval. However, said librettist renamed the pieces and sold them as many times as he wanted on top of royalty payments (1% ?).

Double-dipping:

1. Tang did split some titles into two. That is, same story (with even same names for characters) sometimes for one troupe in Hong Kong while the other troupe performed in Vietnam, per Ng Kwun Lai. A Wife in Nobility is Never Free (一入侯門深似海) and Marrying the Sister-in-Law (再世重溫金鳳緣) may be another example of legitimate twins since they are both Fong's work but decades apart by Tang. The clean version of Yam's The Marriage of Tang Bohu renamed as The Marriage of Three Smiles (三笑姻緣) for Loong is also well-known. A few evil doubles have no such proofs and therefore are not necessarily legitimate twins. For example, same plot, lines, lyrics and names for characters in contemporary opera title Heaven Brought Us Together (天賜良緣) instead of using those titles on records, Loong's A Phoenix in Springtime (金鳳迎春) or Yam's The Merry Phoenix (彩鳳喜迎春).
2. Ex-gratia payments, an honor for Loong, was confirmed by the second Mrs. Tang on radio in the 1980s but never reported by publications from very serious academics or pedestrian A. Rewriting history had been the case more often than not in works of academics, especially from universities in Hong Kong. Another piece of evidence illustrating the paid for or motivated to be biased nature of publications on Cantonese opera.)

== Libretti ==
Over 440 in total.

=== A ===
1. All Because of a Smile

=== B ===
1. Beautiful Begonia (Note: Have disappeared from stage for decades until Artistic Directors of the Cantonese Opera Young Talent Showcase (Yau Ma Tei Theatre Cantonese opera Program in Hong Kong) introduced these to up-and-coming performers for training purpose since they take a better performer. 2013年6月5日(星期三)「拍案驚奇 ─ 唐滌生創作中期作品初探：《一彎眉月伴寒衾》」演前導賞講座)(艷滴海棠紅) or Beautiful Crab Apple Flower
2. Beauty Fades From Twelve Ladies' Tower
3. A Beauty's Flourishing Fragrant or A Pedestal of Rouge Fragrance or Sweet Dew on a Beautiful Flower (3 titles in English for the same one in Chinese)
4. Bird at Sunset
5. The Blessings of the Moon
6. A Buddhist Recluse for Fourteen Years

=== D ===
1. Di Nü Hua (Note: Titles, plus the 1983 version of Dream of Red Chamber, as Cantonese opera pioneer performance, Hong Kong Coliseum, 1984 The Ninth Festival of Asian Arts program, 18 October to 4 November 1984, Hong Kong, Festival of Asian Arts (9th : 1984 : Hong Kong).ISBN 9789627040149) (Note: Titles, plus another debut title in 1982, The Story of Emperor Li, were pioneers in Caesars Palace, Las Vegas, United States.) (Note: Titles were instant hits at debut. Tang lived to see in cinemas only these two of the BIG FOUR.)
2. Dong Xiaowan 1950 film directed by Tang
3. The Double-Pearl Phoenix
4. The Dream Encounter Between Emperor Wu of Han and Lady Wai
5. The Dream of the Red Chamber (Note: Title (1956) was transitional from the one very popular since the Second Sino-Japanese War in Macau to the contemporary popular Hong Kong version since 1983 debut, all with actresses (Yam Kim Fai and Loong Kim Sang) playing full-faced (舒展飽滿圓臉若中秋之月) Jia Baoyu, as meant to be and as described by original author Cao Xueqin: 曹雪芹在《紅樓夢》中所言，免除了男人的泥污和俗臭，加入了女兒的水靈與清徹。)
6. Dream of the West Chamber

=== E ===
1. The Eternal Peony

=== F ===
1. Flower of the Night
2. Forty Years of Cherished Love (Note: Title same as contemporary popular version written by others (陳冠卿《再進沈園》).)
3. The Fourth Son of the Yang Family Visits His Mother starring the same male lead and the wife of Tang's archrival, ironically also written by her husband)
4. The Frosty Night (月落烏啼霜滿天)

=== G ===
1. The Gilded Fan
2. Goddess of the Luo River
3. Goddess from Ninth Heaven
4. Golden Leaf Chrysanthemum 1949, 1952, 1952 and 1960

=== H ===
1. The Happy Wedding
2. The Hero and the Concubine

=== I ===
1. The Impatient Bride written and directed by Tang
2. I'm Crazy About You

=== L ===
1. The Lady's Sash
2. Lonely Moon on a Lonely Bed (一彎眉月伴寒衾) or Sad Autumn (1952 film and 1964 film) for the same Chinese title
3. The Lover with a Heart of Steel
4. Lovers' Reunion or Returning Home on a Snowy Night (一樓風雪夜歸人)
5. The Love Song in the Scripture (艷曲梵經)
6. Love Triangle (春鶯盜御香)

=== M ===
1. The Marriage of Tang Bohu
2. Marrying the Sister-in-Law (Note: Title was Romance in Another World as International Celebration of the Arts to open the Hong Kong Cultural Centre, 5 November-6 December 1989 OCLC Number:670109243 Google Books Search Code:852JULAC_CUHK:21743921130003407)
3. Mistake at the Flower Festival
4. Mrs. Cheng "Alias: A Forsaken Woman" 1954
5. Mysterious Murder (紅菱血) or Hongling's Blood as directed by Tang in 1951 Part 1 and Part 2

=== N ===
1. Nocturnal Dreams of Love

=== O ===
1. The Outburst of a Shrew

=== P ===
1. Pearl Pagoda Part 1 (1953) and Part 2 (1953)
2. The Peony Pavilion
3. A Phoenix in Springtime (1954) or renamed The Merry Phoenix (1958 film by the debut cast)
4. The Purple Hairpin

=== R ===
1. Rain Flower (一自落花成雨後)
2. Rainbow at the End
3. Red Cherries and a Broken Heart
4. The Red Plum Pavilion (紅梅閣上夜歸人)
5. Red Silk Shoes and the Murder
6. Red Tears of an Aspen or White Poplar, Red Tears (1950)
7. Regret from the Spring Lantern and Feather Fan
8. The Reincarnation of a Beauty
9. Reunion at Rouge Alley
10. The Reunion by a White Hare
11. Romance Across the East Wall
12. Romantic Night
13. A Romance of Pear Blossoms

=== S ===
1. A Scholar in a Buddhist House
2. The Spy Who Loves Me
3. The Story of Horse Selling 1956 film Guizhi Sues directed by Tang and 1959 film Gui Zhi Sues written by others with the same English title of this story
4. The Story of the Lute
5. The Story of a Woman Scholar at the Han Place (漢苑玉梨魂)
6. The Summer Snow (see The Injustice to Dou E)
7. Swallows Come Home
8. The Swallow's Message
9. A Sweet Girl's Fancies
10. Sword of Destined Revenge (一劍能消天下仇)

=== T ===
1. Tears of Ashes (一寸相思一寸灰)
2. The Ten-Year Dream

=== W ===
1. War Cape of Rouge and Blood (Note: Title is now more often in the form of a revised version called The Beauty and The General or The Villain, The General and The Heroic Beauty.)
2. The Widow with Grievance
3. A Wife in Nobility is Never Free (一入侯門深似海) (film in hkmdb)

=== X ===
1. Xi Shi

=== Y ===
1. You Sisters of the Red Chamber (紅樓二尤) (Note: This work of Xun Huisheng in very early 1900s in Beijing Opera is also called Mandarin Duck Sword (京劇鴛鴦劍).)
2. Younger Brother Bridge

=== See also ===
- Synopses of Cantonese Opera (Chinese/English)
- search=唐滌生 of Cantonese Opera Young Talent Showcase Webpage (www.hkbarwoymt.com)

Awards
Preceded by Samuel Hui	Golden Needle Award of RTHK Top Ten Chinese Gold Songs Award; 1986 (Posthumous)	Succeeded by Chen Dieyi
