= List of Hong Kong films of 1963 =

A list of films produced in Hong Kong in 1963:

== 1963 ==
Title	Director	Cast	Genre	Notes
1963
The Adulteress	Ho Meng Hua, Li Han Hsiang			
The Adventures Of A Stange Man				
The Barren Valley	Cheung Wai Gwong			
Battling Sounds	Wong Hok Sing			
Because Of Her	Wong Tin Lam, Evan Yang	Grace Chang, Kelly Lai Chen, Roy Chiao Hung, Wang Lai, Mai Ling, Gloria Liu Hsiao-Hui, Tan Ni, Shum Yuet-Wah, Hung Hung, Maggie Li Lin Lin, Emily Li	Mandarin Musical	
Bedside Horror				
Between Love And Hatred	Chun Kim			
Between Vengeance And Love	Li Pingqian			
The Big Revenge (Part 1)				
The Big Revenge (Part 2)				
Bitter Sweet	Griffin Yueh Feng			
The Dragon Lady (The Dragon's Daughter)	Lee Tit	Lee Kok, Wan Man		
Empress Wu Tse-Tien	Li Han Hsiang			Entered into the 1963 Cannes Film Festival
Factory Queen	Mok Hong-See	Ying Ting, Cheung Yee, Lam Yim	Comedy	
The Fake Lovers (aka A Funny Match)	Chu Kei	Tang Pik-Wan, Cheng Pik-Ying, Cecelia Lee Fung-Sing	Comedy	
Happy Ending	Chu Kei	Yam Kim-fai, Ng Kwun-Lai, Pak Fung-Sin, Lee Heung-Kam, Ma Kam-Neong		
Lady with the Lute	Bu Wan-Cang	Helen Li Mei	Drama	
The Love Eterne	Li Han Hsiang	Betty Loh Ti, Ivy Ling Po	Huangmei opera	
Lust Is the Worst Vice	Sun-Ma Sze-Tsang	Sun-Ma Sze-Tsang, Ng Kwun-Lai, Fung Wong-Nui, Poon Yat-On	Cantonese opera	
The Millionaire's Daughter	Lee Tit	Miu Kam-Fung, Lee Heung-kam, Yuet-ching Lee	Drama	
The Prince Becomes a Monk (aka Prince Yuk Loon, Azalea Tomb)	Chu Kei	Yam Kim-fai, Yu Lai-Zhen	Cantonese opera	
She is Different (aka Three Sisters)	Chiang Wai-Kwong	Law Yim-hing, Wu Fung, Pearl Au Ka-Wai, Mai Ling, Lee Heung-kam, Mak Gei	Drama	
Tear-Laden Rose	Chor Yuen	Patrick Tse, Hung Nam, Wu Fung,	Romance	
Three Fools Searching for Their Daughter	Mok Hong-See, Chan Chung-Kin	Lam Ka-Sing, Man Lan, Leung Sing-Bo, Tam Lan-Hing, Chan Ho-Kau, To Sam-Ku, Lee Sin-Pan, Leung Suk-Hing	Comedy	
Zuo ye meng hun zhong				
