= Yam Kim-fai =

Cantonese opera performer (1913–1989)

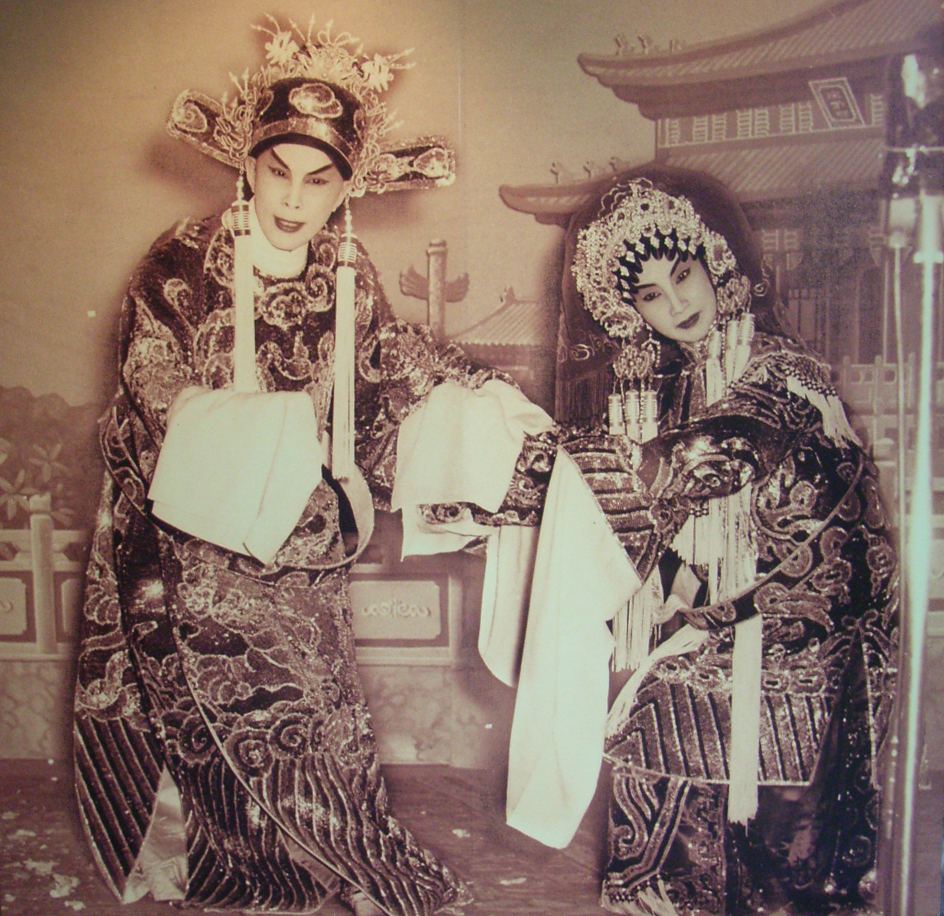
- Portrait of Yam (left)
- Born: Yam Lee Chor (任麗初); 4 February 1913; Nanhai County, Guangdong Province, Republic of China
- Died: 29 November 1989 (aged 76); Happy Valley, British Hong Kong
- Occupations: Actress; performer; (文武生)
- Awards: Cantonese Opera Film Century Award 14th Hong Kong Film Awards

Chinese name
- Traditional Chinese: 任劍輝
- Simplified Chinese: 任剑辉
Transcriptions
Standard Mandarin
- Hanyu Pinyin: Rén Jiànhuī
Yue: Cantonese
- Yale Romanization: Yahm Gim-fāi
- Jyutping: Jam^{4} Gim^{3} Fai^{1}

Yam Lee Chor
- Traditional Chinese: 任麗初
- Simplified Chinese: 任丽初
Transcriptions
Standard Mandarin
- Hanyu Pinyin: Rén Líchū
- Musical career
- Origin: Hong Kong
- Genre: Cantonese opera
- Instrument: Voice
- Member of: Chor Fung Ming Cantonese Opera Troupe 雛鳳鳴

Yam Kim-fai (Chinese: 任劍輝, 4 February 1913 – 29 November 1989), also known as Ren Jianhui was a Cantonese opera actress in China and Hong Kong.

Yam was most known for her ability to sing in the lower register. Her opera voice was indistinguishable from a male one and allowed her to play both male or female roles.

On 24 June 1972, Yam performed for the last time in public. In 1989, she died at home in Hong Kong due to pleural effusion.

== Early life ==
Born Yam Lee Chor (Chinese: 任麗初), Yam performed as a pastime with a Cantonese opera troupe since when still in grade school. When Yam was 14, her aunt (Chinese: 小叫天), another Cantonese opera actress, taught Yam the foundation courses. Very soon, Yam quit school and began her formal opera performance studies with Wong Lui Hap (Chinese: 黃侶俠), who was known for being the female version of Ma Sze Tsang but became known more often as Sifu of Yam. After the Second Sino-Japanese War, Wong worked with Luo Pinchao in Hong Kong at some point. Although they never co-operated again once the formal contract expired, Yam provided for Wong, a working poor in modern language, who was not well-off late in life (Chinese: 生養死葬).

=== Rooftops in Guangdong ===
Jade Flower (Chinese: 玉瓊花) was one of the first female leads to co-star on stage. Yam rose to prominence and eventually becoming a male lead at the age of 17, (Note: 經常落鄉演戲，在悟州、佛山一炮而紅，成名作是《西廂待月》。) switching between being male lead and playing second fiddle to Wong or other actresses such as Chan Pei Mui (陳皮梅), who were more experienced and well-known, for another few years before venturing out on her own as male lead in many all-female troupes (小飛紅-太平艷影劇團/譚蘭卿-梅花影劇團) in "rooftop theatres".

Rooftop theatres were for all-female troupes since the time of Lee Suet Fong (李雪芳) who formed the all-female troupe (「群芳艷影」) which she left when married in 1923. (Fong, a female lead since 16, performed with Lee at some point, who was inspired and created her own vocal style) Since the first top four all-female troupes, female leads became less noteworthy as the actresses in male lead roles. Male and female performers were not often in same troupe until after Japan took Guangdong. The reputation of an all-female troupe was often regarded as less there counterpart all-male troupe. Yam observed that male leads were called sissies in the street while the jingles below (in Chinese) reflected the sentiment about those troupes.

《鄉下佬買戲》：「講到鰟鱓女班經已做到怕，有文無武而且有鱓仲老過我阿媽。」

香港報章：「女優薪金微賤，當可以減班主之負擔。」

Yam became known as the female version of Kwai Ming Yeung, both AAA and vocal, before 1933, (Note: 【細說任龍雛】梨園客/王心帆(顧問) 第22-24頁 太平全男班劇團(小散班) 太平戲院) the year Ma Sze Tsang hired Tam Lan Hing to perform with him in Hong Kong.

=== Theatres in Macau ===
Many troupes with male performers (Note: Troupes:- 新聲前身:嗚聲劇團(鄧碧雲/歐陽儉/徐時)《晨妻暮嫂 - 歐陽儉》、平安戲院=平安劇團:(何芙蓮/鄧碧雲/何非凡/半日安)《金粉殿 - 徐若呆》、平安戲院=平安劇團:(譚蘭卿/半日安)《嫦娥奔月》、新太平男女班(譚蘭卿/黃千歲/歐陽儉)《神秘女皇》、金星劇團(譚蘭卿/黃千歲)、清平戲院/花錦繡(花旦譚蘭卿\小生梁國風\二花小飛紅\醜生小覺天\武生張醒非)《玉面狐狸 - 羅素》籌募經費、三王劇團(上海妹/半日安)) followed her first own (Chinese:「鏡花影女劇團」, (Note: 「鏡花影」全女班「藝員一覽表」從「澳門賽狗會萬家樂戲院演鏡花影女劇團」的海報中，行當有十多廿個。武生梁少平、文武生任劍輝、小武呂劍雲、唯一艷旦牡丹蘇*、青衣旦粵蘭芳、花旦鍾翠蟬、布鳳英、桂花元等，還有正旦、正生、總生、小生、公腳、大花面、二花面、唯一丑生、男女丑等，有的行當如今已不復存在。由「文武生任劍輝」執正帥印，「日演新編良劇《醋醃藍橋》」，「晚演著名猛劇《狸貓換太子 仁宗皇認母》」。是晚特煩任劍輝先飾陳琳，後飾仁宗；牡丹蘇先飾寇珠，後飾李宸妃。(牡丹蘇1927年3月起，與李雪芳到美国演出三年。)) 1935–1942) with Tsui Yan Sam (Chinese: 徐人心) as co-star not long since Yam was initially hired to perform in a temporary theatre (collapsed after 5 days) built in greyhound racing stadium. (Now known as Canidrome, was special to Yam who attended the grand opening in 1963 with Loong, Pak Yin and others.) Co-stars also included other actresses (Chinese: 紫雲霞、車秀英) at times as and when Yam saw fit. Theatres in Macau her all-female troupe performed included the Ching Ping Theatre at Travessa do Auto Novo ( Chinese: 清平戲院). To reflect her respect when Chan Pei Mui with sister Chan Pei Aap joined her, Yam renamed her troupe ("梅"花艷影劇團) in deference to her former boss who also shared male lead status with Yam in this troupe. The three of them offered the female version of Kwai Ming Yeung (Yam), Sit Gok Sin (Mui) and Ma Sze Tsang (Aap), Tsui Yan Sam (徐人心)

Portugal owned Macau during the Second World War and it was neutral during the conflict. Japan's respect for that neutrality made Macau a safe haven for migration from elsewhere otherwise occupied by Japan. Population in Macau went up significantly as a result. Their support for performances made life relatively easy for performers.

Ma Sze Tsang formed the first Hong Kong troupe with both actors and actresses in 1933. Records show Yam's all-female troupe was the last one still doing well in theatres since then. For ten years (1935–1945), Yam made Macau her home, when her hometown in Guangdong fell to the Japanese during the Second Sino-Japanese War. Meanwhile, she moved her family, including her (Chinese custom, actually paternal first cousins.) younger sister Yam Bing-yee (Chinese: 任冰兒) into her new home in Macau. Occasionally, Yam in 1939 renamed that same all-female opera troupe (「鏡花艷影劇團」/高陞戲院/紫雲霞/《夜出虎狼關》郎紫峯=郎筠玉) to perform in Hong Kong or in 1942 travelled to perform in Guangdong with Hung Sin Nui's Sifu (何芙蓮) as the co-star. Hung met Yam that year.

In Macau, she met the six major contributors to her career, two men and a married couple Ho Yin & Chen Keng (何賢 及 陳瓊) through the two brothers who eventually became the troupe manager (Chinese: 徐時) and librettist (Chinese: 徐若呆). Deng Fen (鄧芬) became her godfather and vocal style tutor while the other man helped manage the finances, holding the purse strings at times and looking after the war chest Yam built up in Macau.

=== Theatres in Hong Kong ===
Yam was the male lead (Note: 【細說任龍雛】梨園客/王心帆(顧問) 第148頁 「翻生」賈寶玉) in many Cantonese opera stage productions, in Macau initially and in Hong Kong since 1945, opposite many actresses, including Sheung Hoi Mui (上海妹), Che Sau Ying (車秀英), Lan-Hing Tam (譚蘭卿) and Tang Pik Wan (鄧碧雲). With the 1942/3 financial help from Mr. Ho Yin, father of Edmund Ho, she formed a new opera troupe (Note: 【戲曲品味】第六十期 - 新聲滄桑歲月 紀念戲迷情人任劍輝 (岳清)) called New Voice Opera Troupe (「新聲劇團」) with manager (徐時), librettists (徐若呆/歐陽儉) and the following performers who joined the troupe one at a time:-

1. Chan Yim Nung (陳艷儂), the Daan (Chinese: 旦)
2. Au Yeung Kim (歐陽儉), the Cau (Chinese: 丑)
3. Lang Chi Bak (靚次伯), the Zing (Chinese: 淨)
4. Yam Bing Yee (任冰兒)
5. Bak Sheut Sin (白雪仙)

Dream of Red Chamber in Macau was one of many highlights in her career since being the last all-female troupe standing. The trend of huge production cost never recoverable from no matter how good box-office record as a result also caused Yam headache.

Yam was known since very young as the single financial source of immediate family, extended families, big spender co-star and associated families. Yam had a reputation of being very generous, footing the bills when her troupe was in trouble. Chan Lap Ban told in 1989 on camera the old days when they performed in villages (both age 20 or so). Investors failed to pay for their performance. Yam as the patriarch actually provided for the troupe to be all home safe, with her personal gold collection.

Since leaving Macau, there was no more financing, but the spending spree continued. A "too good to be just student" of Tang allowing the free use of his story-on-air saved Yam/Lang/Au Yeung from ("大包細") financial ruin. The pay was HK$200 per day of performance while ticket price was HK$6. The spending spree made it necessary for Yam to rely heavily on film roles for income and a real estate portfolio properly managed by reliable personnel.

Yam's The Marriage of Tang Bohu, renamed in 1974 as The Marriage of Three Smiles (三笑姻緣), came to the rescue in 1956 when the Tang flub started on day one, let alone no more than 6 rows of audience in 1956 the world was never informed. The flubbing of Tang continued until the 1957 Di Nü Hua in which Yam as male lead played the more important role in Tang's work for the first time. However, that ended after The Purple Hairpin. They are the only two films among Tang's BIG FOUR which Tang had the opportunity to bask in the glory before he died. Cinematographic plans to bring titles to cinemas before these two were cancelled (Note: 興友影業公司《紅樓夢》電影: 1. 花氣襲人; 2. 晴雯補裘; 3. 賈政罪子; 4. 黛玉葬花; 5. 金玉良緣; 6. 黛玉歸天; 7. 寶玉哭靈) as a result of very bad receptions. The movie rights of other BIG FOUR titles never came up until decades later. This is the second ruin that lasted six long years. What Yam earned by chance encounter (見獵心起) in the process was a successor she treasured for close to 30 years.

The third major financial disaster was rescued with her extremely exhausting 1968 North America tour, more than a decade since she was deprived of the chance to say goodbye to her dying mother, the most treasured family member. Yam paid for the four-year long production of a film in Cantonese. The cost is said to be somewhere between that of two films directed by Li Han-hsiang. The Magnificent Concubine (1962 film) was the first Chinese-language film (楊貴妃 (1962年電影)) to win the Grand Prix for Best Interior Photography and Color. The Empress Wu Tse-Tien was also entered into the 1963 Cannes Film Festival. However, this 1968 film has never reached anywhere beyond Hong Kong and was screened in cinemas only a few times for the five decades since released. This 1982 stage version is also regularly put on stage by later generations of Cantonese opera performers.

== Career ==
A performer on stage first and foremost, Yam was the male lead in many Cantonese opera stage productions in Hong Kong, post-war, opposite many actresses, including but not limited to Chan Yim Nung, Lai-Zhen Yu, Fong Yim Fun, Tang Pik Wan, and Hung Sin Nui.

Many of her performances were made into films, such as the 1953 remake of Sweet Girl.

1. Fong Yim Fun since Golden Phoenix Opera Troupe (Chinese: 芳艷芬, 金鳳屏劇團) – top-billed instead of Yam sometimes. Many titles were adapted for the screen, a few iconic ones are listed below. Yam is in Qing Dynasty attire including pao, mao (a stiff cap) and magua (a buttoned mandarin jacket 'for the rich') for the first two below, both set in late 1800s and early 1900s.

	Year	Title	In Chinese	Notes/Ref.
1	1955	A Beauty's Flourishing Fragrant	一枝紅艷露凝香	first version^{Repeat 1}
2	1956	The Story of Little Cabbage and Yeung Nai-mo	小白菜情困楊乃武	
3	1956	Feather Fan Under Spring Lantern	春燈羽扇	first version^{Repeat 2}
4	1957	Goddess of the Luo River	洛神	
5	1958	Beauty Fades From Twelve Ladies' Tower	香銷十二美人樓	B^{typo}T^{correct} in HKMDB
6	1958	Butterfly Lovers	梁祝恨史	pdf full libretto
7	1958	Swallows Come Home	一年一度燕歸來	
8	1958	A Buddhist Recluse for Fourteen Years	火網梵宮十四年	
9	1958	The Story of Yutangchun	玉堂春	
10	1958	The Merry Phoenix	彩鳳喜迎春	
11	1959	The Summer Snow	六月雪	pdf full libretto
12	1959	A Pedestal of Rouge Fragrance or Sweet Dew on a Beautiful Flower	一枝紅艷露凝香	second version^{Repeat 1}
13	1959	Regret from the Spring Lantern and Feather Fan	春燈羽扇恨	second version^{Repeat 2}
14	1959	The Moonlight and Pipa of the Borderland	萬里琵琶關外月	HKU URL
15	1959	The Dream Encounter Between Emperor Wu of Han and Lady Wai	漢武帝夢會衛夫人	

2. Lai-Zhen Yu (Chinese: 余麗珍) – many movies were made from stage productions. For example, 1960 film Golden Chrysanthemum (Chinese: 《血洗梅花澗》/《七彩金葉菊》) and 1951 film A King Speaks His Heart (《帝苑春心化杜鵑》) with both Sit Gok Sin and Ma Sze Tsang as well.

3. Chan Yim Nung (陳艷儂) – the Dream of the Red Chamber (《紅樓夢》), Red Chamber in the Sea (《海角紅樓》)

4. Tang Pik Wan (鄧碧雲) – In Macau Wife in the morning, sister-in-law at night (《晨妻暮嫂》). Many movies (1947, 1952 and 1957 My wife married my brother) were made from this stage production. For example, 1956 film Guizhi Sues from the title The Daughter of the Horse Trader or Kwaichi sues (《販馬記》/《桂枝告狀》) which was Yam's debut but not Tang's.

5. Hung Sin Nui (紅線女) – vocal records like Kingdom and the Beauty or Prince and the Waitress (《游龍戲鳳》1953) were made from those plays. Stage production at Wing Lok Theatre (《胭脂虎棒打紫薇郎》,《女媧煉石補青天》) was, for example, in Hong Kong, early 1950s. Ngor Jie selling dumplings (《娥姐賣粉果》) in June 1952 was the last time shared stage.

These actresses above are successful performers in their own right. They shared the stage with as well as had film roles opposite many male leads throughout their career. Tang Pik Wan actually took on male lead roles as well while Chan Yim Nung did that in late 1950s as well as much later in life in United States for leisure.

=== Films ===
In movies from 1951 to 1968, Yam played the male lead opposite just about every female lead, young like daughter of Leung Sing Bor included. In the 1961 film, "Fun on Polygamous Marriage" (《八美審狀元》), Yam is married to eight wives; Lai-Zhen Yu (余麗珍), comedian Lan-Hing Tam (譚蘭卿, 1908–1981) and Yam Bing-yee (任冰兒) are three of the actresses opposite Yam in it as the wives. However, her first film was "A Mysterious Night" in 1937 after observing film-making as a friend of Luo Pinchao and others. Good proportion of the 300 movies she made are contemporary, neither in Cantonese opera costumes nor set in early 1900s when women still had bound feet.

As co-star	Of	Selective Actresses	In Chinese	Films select
59	62	Yim-hing Law (born 1924)	羅艷卿	1960 Comedy & Drama The Random Harvest, 1965 Masculine vocal style The Red Robe and 1960 Masculine & Martial arts Rescue at the West River
57	58	Kwun-Lai Ng (born 1931)	吳君麗	1959 Classic Fete of the White Hare, 1958 Drama Substituting a Racoon for the Prince, 1957 Romantic The Phoenix Hairpin and 1964 Drama Mysterious Murder
34	36	Lai-Zhen Yu (1923–2004)	余麗珍	1960 Drama Golden Chrysanthemum, 1961 Comedy Fun on Polygamous Marriage, Masculine & Martial arts, 1958 The Story of Liu Jinding, 1962 Luo Cheng at the Gate and 1963 The Lotus Lamp
28	29	Fong Yim Fun (born 1928)	芳艷芬	See above mostly since the Golden Phoenix and then Sun Yim Yeung era.
23	24	Tang Bik-wan (1924–1991)	鄧碧雲	1954 Loyal lover in Paying Nocturnal Sacrifice to Kam-Kiu or 1956 Guizhi Sues, 1956 Masculine vocal style & Martial arts How Xue Dingshan Thrice Angered Fan Lihua and 1957 Drama Prosperity Knocks
10	27	Wong-Nui Fung (1925–1992)	鳳凰女	1962 Comedy A Test of Love and 1963 Masculine I Want My Country and My Wife Back
0	1	Tsui Yan Sam (born 1920)	徐人心	1937, Ensemble cast, Contemporary in A Mysterious Night
Total 211	237	of 294 films made total counted to-date		

The actresses listed above were accomplished performers with careers spanning stage, film, and, later, television. Fong Yin Fun, Yu Lai Zhen and Ng Kwun Lai all owned film production companies and regularly cast Yam, occasionally placing her above themselves in the billing order. Law Yim Hing and Ng Kwun Lai appeared with Yam infrequently on stage but featured in many of her films. Four of the seven - Fong Yin Fun, Law Yim Hing, Fung Wong Nui and Tang Pik Wan - donned male attire on stage and in films at various stages of their careers. The 1956 film How Wong Fei-hung Saved the Lovelorn Monk from the Ancient Monastery illustrates the breadth of Yam's film roles.

=== Linchpin ===
Since 1956, for four years and then only sporadically in 1960s, on stage she was limited to only work opposite Bak Sheut Sin, fifteen years her junior and green from debut only in 1953, as the abandoned woman, a character like Eliza in My Fair Lady, in Red Cherries and a Broken Heart (Chinese: 紅了櫻桃碎了心).

Between 1953 and 1956, Bak played second fiddle (flowery role 花衫) to either Fong Yim Fun or Hung Sin Nui when Yam was the male lead opposite any one of them or Chan Yim Nung before that.

They reprised many of those roles when the operas were adapted for the screen between 1951 and 1968. The only two made into movies are Li Yi (李益) in The Legend of the Purple Hairpin and Zhou Shixian (Chinese: 周世顯) in Tai Nui Fa. However, some of Yam's other roles like Liu Mengmei (Chinese: 柳夢梅) in the Cantonese opera version of The Peony Pavilion and Pei Yu (Chinese: 裴禹) in The Reincarnation of Lady Plum Blossom were never made into movies. The latter is available only in vocal record. Her Liu Mengmei (Chinese: 柳夢梅) was never recorded for commercial purpose with Bak Sheut Sin.

=== Farewell ===
The last overseas tour was 1968 in North America. With all of her 'next' generation, in tow, the last on stage live production of five titles in 1968/69/70 followed the last film "Tragedy of the Poet King" released in 1968. Her last public performance was on 24 June 1972.

== Vocal style ==
Yam was once upon a time known as the female version of and is still one of the more famous exponent of Kwai Ming Yeung style.

Yam demonstrated this style in film The Red Robe (1965) and on stage titles like "Wong Fei-fu's Rebellion" or "The Revolt from Huang Feihu’s Rebellion" (Chinese: 《黃飛虎反五關》) instead of the roles (as romantic scholars) she spent more time on in her 40s and later years on stage. However, the voice still rose to the occasion. In 1960 for charity, Yam performed a duet with the late Leung Sing Bor, the song called "Gaoping level" (Chinese: 《高平關取級》).

(Note: Song:- 《李後主》之《去國歸降》)According to experience of James Wong in 1960s as backup singer for this song, Yam was louder than the four of them. They were shocked by the "little old lady" met that day.

Yam reprised her role as Liang Shanbo (Chinese: 梁山伯) more than once since the title debut. A film with Fong Yin Fun (芳艷芬) released in 1958 was followed by CD with Lee Bo Ying (李寶瑩) released in 1960s, (Chinese: 《梁祝恨史》之《樓台會》) but often nicknamed (Chinese: 《梁祝恨史》之《映紅霞》). The leads each in this title also has a solo from this title in CDs. Fong performed her solo for charity in mid-1980s on stage, almost 30 years since retirement. Several more CDs with Lee as co-star are very popular including sets (Note: Sets:- "釵頭鳳"，"無雙傳") just like sets with others. (Note: Co-star - "set":- Chinese: 冼劍麗 - "胭脂巷口故人來"，冼劍麗 - "榮歸會李仙"，崔妙芝 - "琵琶記") Yam made many CDs (Note: Co-star - "song":- 秦小梨 - “《玉葵寶扇》之《碧容探監》”，羅麗娟 - "飄"，上海妹 - "好女兩頭瞞"，小飛紅 - "恩愛夫妻"，小燕飛 - "海角紅樓"，小燕飛 - "款擺紅綾帶"，銀劍影 - "紅衣贈杞良") with many co-stars or solo (Note: Songs:- 情淚浸袈裟，《海角紅樓》之《海角紅樓恨》，《穿金寶扇》之《金扇緣》，《梁祝恨史》之《有情活把鴛鴦葬》，一枝紅艷露凝香，《胭脂巷口故人來》之《孤雁再還巢》，《牡丹亭驚夢》之《玩真》) since what believed to be the first one (Note: Co-star - "song":- 梁卓卿 - "雅士採梅香") in 1937.

Naamyam (Chinese: 南音) is one particular type of songs that Yam is very respected for. Paying Nocturnal Sacrifice to Kam-Kiu (Note: Paying Nocturnal Sacrifice to Jinjiao / Yehh Tsai Kam Kiew (in Cantonese) National Archives (Singapore) Song:- 祭金嬌) related to the film released in 1954 is an example quoted when Yam's name comes up on this topic. Good portion of the 1957 film Prosperity Knocks also has such demonstration of Yam vocal style.

Reflecting the lighter/grassroots side of Yam's formal training with Wong Lui Hap (Chinese: 黃侶俠) is a duet (Note: Co-star - "song":- 歐陽儉 - "《蕭月白》之《賣白欖》") with Au Yeung Kim. The play, co-star Chan Yim Nung, with title Siu Yuet-Pak (Chinese: 蕭月白) was very popular in Macau right after the Second Sino-Japanese War. Films by Cheung Ying and others are:-

1. How Two Naughty Girls Thrice Insulted Xiao Yuebai (1952)
2. The True Story of Siu Yuet-Pak (Part 1) (1955)
3. The True Story of Siu Yuet-Pak (Part 2) (1955)

=== How The Scholar Tong Pak Fu Won the Maid Chau Heung (1957) (Chinese: 唐伯虎點秋香) ===
Yam has shared this, but cleaned up, side with her protégée as well; putting Loong on the map globally with just one move. In 1974, Yam and Loong wore matching sweater and scarf in studio to record for Loong's first starring role in a film as male lead. The solo (with some Leung/Tam/Lang/Sum) scene about picking his wife-to-be became the hit theme song many now contemporary performers could even recite in reverse even though they were still a pre-teen or barely teenagers back then.

This film San Xiao Yin Yuan (Chinese: 三笑姻緣) has been available on YouTube channel called cantonesefilms_classic since 17 March 2022. It is also known as Laugh in the Sleeve (1975).

Part I viewing to date is 1,249,163.
Part II viewing to date is 477,588.

In a 1974 session, Yam helped Loong record her first leading role in a film, a performance that garnered global recognition. In the film, Loong played the character of a man picking his bride-to-be. The solo is regarded as anthemic and generationally inspiring.

== Commemoration ==
In recognition of the talents of four late artists, Hongkong Post issued the first series of special stamps on movie stars on 15 November 1995. This stamp set focused on Hong Kong's movie stars, saluting four stars who have left their marks on film history. Yam, in Cantonese opera costume, was featured on the HK$2.60 stamp.

For her 100th birthday, Yam Kim-fai centenary celebration at HK Film Archive

	Year	Co-star	Title	In Chinese
1	1954	Tang Pik Wan	Paying Nocturnal Sacrifice to Kam-kiu	夜祭金嬌
2	1959	Fong Yim Fun	The Story of Little Cabbage and Yeung Nai-mo	小白菜情困楊乃武
3	1959	Fong Yim Fun	Regret from the Spring Lantern and Feather Fan	春燈羽扇恨
4	1959	Bak Sheut Sin	Butterfly and Red Pear Blossom	蝶影紅梨記
5	1958	Bak Sheut Sin	The Peach Blossom Fairy	桃花仙子
6	1960	Yu Lai Zhen	Fan Lei-fa	紮腳樊梨花
7	1961	Ng Kwun Lai / Tam Lan Hing	The Courtship of the Queen	百鳥朝凰
8	1960	Law Yim Hing	The Story of Lee Sin	李仙傳
9	1961	Law Yim Hing	The Golden Cat	怪俠金絲貓
10	1955	Yam was the female lead	An Actress's Struggle	任劍輝舞台奮鬥史

In 2013, the Cantonese Opera Legend Yam Kim Fai – Repertoire Select by librettist Tang Ti-sheng (Alias:Tong Tik Sang/Tong Dick-san). was organized by the Leisure and Cultural Services Department, Hong Kong.

- Only one actress listed in male lead role (finished hkbarwo.com training school in 1983)
- Only one, aged 60 or older performer listed, never worked for Chor Fung Ming (Young Phoenix) Cantonese Opera Troupe.

	Title	In Chinese
1	The Story of the Lute	琵琶記
2	The Daughter of the Horse Trader	販馬記
3	Princess Cheung Ping	帝女花
4	A Romance of Pear Blossoms	蝶影紅梨記
5	The Reincarnation of a Beauty	再世紅梅記
6	Sweet Dew on a Beautiful Flower	一枝紅艷露凝香
7	A Buddhist Recluse for Fourteen Years	火網梵宮十四年

On 4 February 2016, her 103rd birthday, Google Hong Kong's homepage (Google.com.hk) Google Doodle was her illustration by Google artist Sophie Diao.

== See also ==
- Bak Sheut Sin
- Hung Sin Nui
- Tang Pik Wan
