= Fong Yim Fun =

Chinese opera singer and actress

Fong Yim Fun BBS, MBE
- Chinese: 芳艷芬
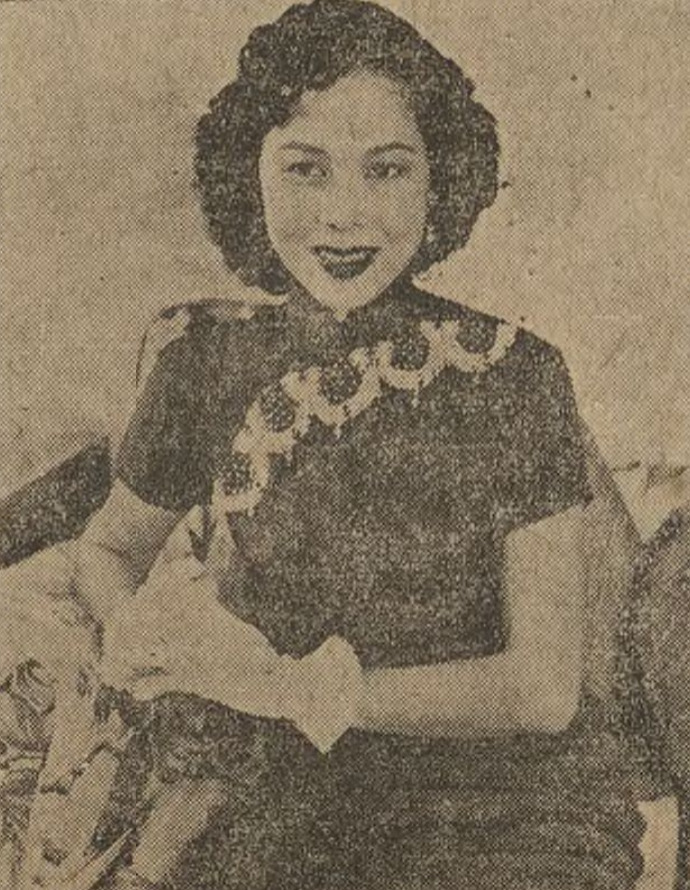
- Fong in 1953
- Born: Chow Tung-si; 1920s Enping, Guangdong, China
- Other names: Yanfen Fang, Fong Yim-Fen, Fong Yim Fun, Leung Yin-fong, Yang Leung Yin-Fong, Dr. Yang Leung Yin-fong, Dr. Yang Leung Yin-fong Katie, Katie Yang
- Occupations: Actress; Cantonese opera singer
- Years active: 1937–1959 (before the wedding)
- Known for: Cantonese opera, Fong style Cantonese opera, founder of Zhili Film Company
- Spouse: Dr. Yang Kyung Waung (m. 1959)

Signature
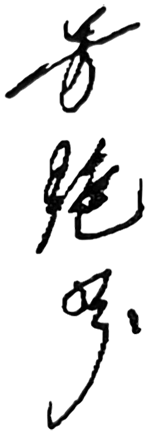

Katie Fong Yim Fun (Chinese: 芳艷芬, born 1920s) is a former Chinese actress and Cantonese opera performer from Hong Kong. Fong is credited with over 150 films. Fong has a star at Avenue of Stars in Hong Kong.

== Early life ==
Fong was born as Chow Tung-si (Chinese: 周東仕) in Enping, Guangdong Province, China. She was born in 1926, 1928, or 1929. Fong grew up with a single adopted mother, and therefore changed her name to Leung Yin-fong (Chinese: 梁燕芳). Fong learned Cantonese opera from Kwok Sing Theatre.

== Education ==
In 1995, Fong received a Doctorate of Humane Letters award from California Lutheran University. In 2004, Fong received the award Doctor of Social Sciences, honoris causa conferred by Lingnan University. In 2013, Fong received a Doctor of Social Science, honoris causa, from the Chinese University of Hong Kong.

== Career ==
In 1937, Fong joined Sing Sau Nin Opera Troupe. At age 10, Fong began her Cantonese opera training. By age 13, Fong earned the status of supporting actress (Chinese: 二幫花旦) in Cantonese opera in Guangzhou, China. By age 16, Fong earned the status of female lead actress (Chinese: 正印花旦) in Cantonese opera.

Fong is known as Queen of Hudan and her unique singing style in Cantonese Opera is known as the Fong style.

In 1950, Fong debuted as a film actress in Hong Kong. Fong appeared in The Flower Drops by the Red Chamber, a 1950 drama film directed by Ng Wui. Fong also appeared in drama and comedy films.

In 1953, Fong founded the Sun Yim Yeung Opera Troupe. In 1953, Fong also founded Zhili Film Company.

Fong appeared in A Cadet in Love's Battle, a 1953 comedy film and Zhili's inaugural production directed by Chiang Wai-Kwong. Fong and Yam Kim-fai performed Cantonese opera both on stage and in many films including Swallows Come Home (1958).

In 1959, Fong retired from the entertainment industry.

Fong's last film was Joy To the World, a 1963 Cantonese opera film directed by Lo Yung. Fong is credited with over 150 films.

Fong's last film by her own Chik Lei (Zhili) Film Company was Follow the Husband, a 1959 film produced by Law Kim-Long, the male lead. Fong worked closely with Law both on stage and in films.

In September 2012, with Fong's donation, Shaw College of The Chinese University of Hong Kong created “The Art of Fong Yim Fun Sustainability Project.” In August 2014, the Fong Yim Fun Art Gallery was formally opened.

== Repertoire ==
This is only a partial list and all but one* were the work of playwright Tang Ti-sheng.

1. The Summer Snow (aka The Injustice to Dou E)
2. Tung Siu-Yen
3. Butterfly Lovers*
4. Swallows Come Home
5. The Immortal Zhang Yuqiao, the Most Respectable Courtesan (see Jian Youwen)
6. Feather Fan Under Spring Lantern
7. Beauty Fades From Twelve Ladies' Tower
8. Goddess of the Luo River
9. A Beauty's Flourishing Fragrant (aka A Pedestal of Rouge Fragrance or Sweet Dew on a Beautiful Flower)
10. The Dream Encounter Between Emperor Wu of Han and Lady Wai (debut opposite Sit Gok Sin)
11. Mrs. Cheng (aka A Forsaken Woman)
12. The Love Song in the Scripture

== Filmography ==
=== Films ===
This is a partial list of films.

- 1950 The Flower Drops by the Red Chamber
- 1950 The Story of Tung Siu-Yen - Tung Siu-Yen
- 1950 A Girl Named Liang Lengyan (Part 1 and Part 2) - Leung Lang-Yim
- 1952 Private Lives of Opera and Movie Stars - as Herself
- 1953 Swallows' Return - Luk Sheung-Hing
- 1955 Backyard Adventures - Lover
- 1955 The Faithful Wife
- 1956 Funny Girl
- 1958 The Tragic Story of Liang Shanbo and Zhu Yingtai
- 1963 Joy to the World

== Awards ==
- 1995 Member of the Most Excellent Order of the British Empire (MBE).
- 1998 Honorary Fellow. Hong Kong Academy for Performing Arts.
- 2003 Bronze Bauhinia Star (BBS) as Dr Yang Leung Yin-fong, Katie, BBS. Presented by the Hong Kong Special Administrative Region Government.
- Star. Avenue of Stars. Tsim Sha Tsui waterfront in Hong Kong.
- 36th Hong Kong Film Awards, Lifetime Achievement

== Personal life ==
In 1949, Fong moved back to Hong Kong. In 1959, Fong married Dr. Yang Kyung Waung.

== Gallery ==
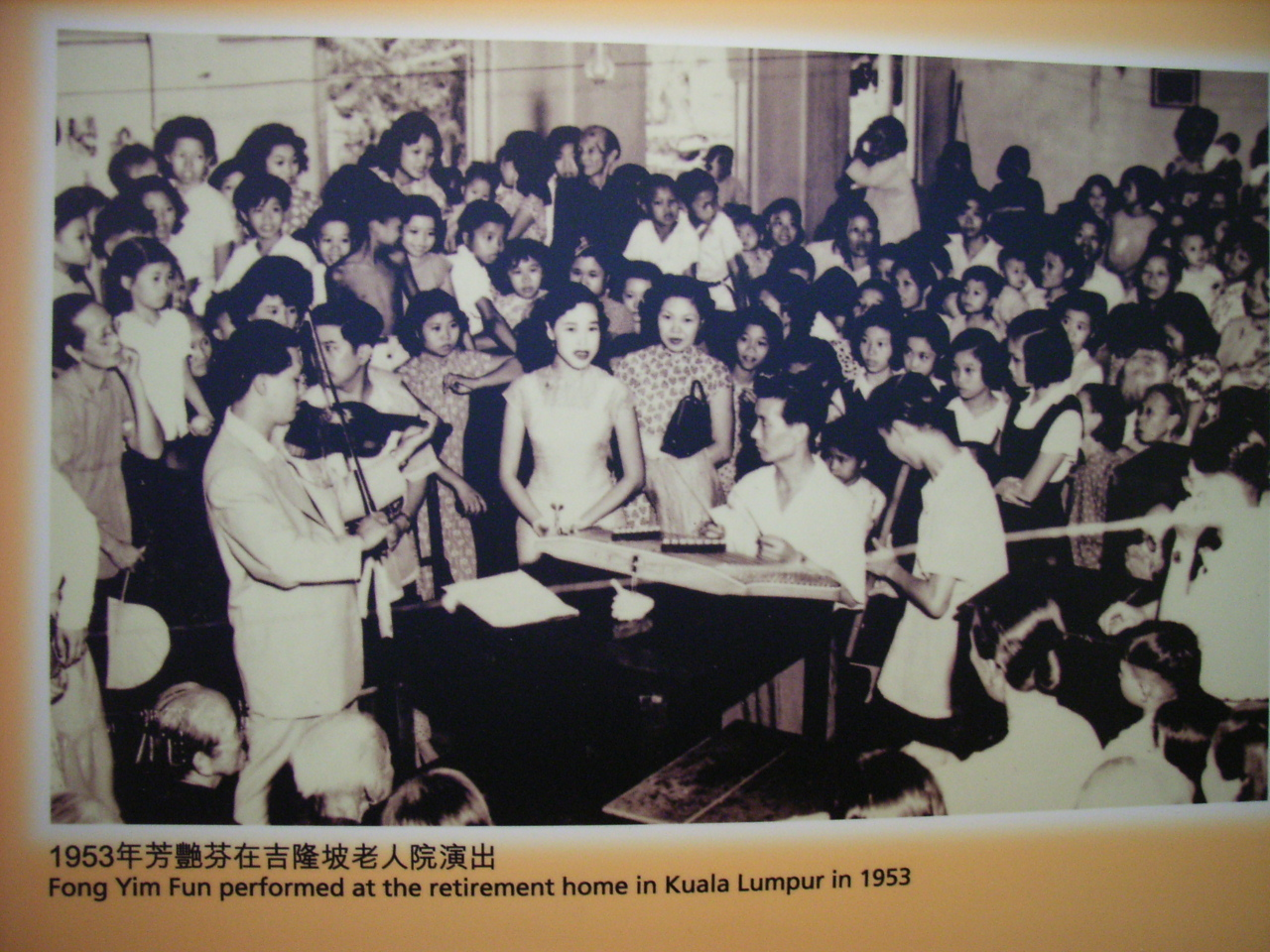

== See also ==
- Chinese Artists Association of Hong Kong
- California Lutheran University#Kwan Fong Gallery of Art and Culture
- Hung Sin Nui
