= The Prince Becomes a Monk =

1963 Hong Kong film by Chu Kei

- Directed by: Chu Kei
- Starring: Yam Kim-fai, Yu Lai-Zhen
- Production company: Lux Film Company
- Release date: 20 February 1963
- Running time: 86 minutes
- Country: Hong Kong
- Language: Cantonese
- Budget: HK$60,000

The Prince Becomes a Monk (Chinese: 玉龍太子出家 or 禪院鐘聲), sometimes known as Prince Yuk Loon and Azalea Tomb, is a 1963 Hong Kong Cantonese opera film directed by Chu Kei (珠璣). It stars Yam Kim-fai as the protagonist, Prince Yuk Loon.

== Cast ==
- Yam Kim-fai as Prince Yuk Loon
- Yu Lai-Zhen
- Chan Kam-tong
- Liang Tsi-pak
- Lee Heung-kam
- Lai Man
- Ma Siu-ying
- Ching Lai
- Cheung Sang

== Reception ==
Released for cinema on 20 February 1963, the film has received positive reception from critics. VCD was released in 2005 by CN Entertainment Ltd.
