= Salt Commission =

Organization in Tang China

The Salt Industry Commission was an organization created in 758, during the decline of Tang dynasty China, used to raise tax revenue from the state monopoly of the salt trade, or salt gabelle. The commission sold salt to private merchants at a price that included a low but cumulatively substantial tax, which was passed on by the merchants at the point of sale. This basic mechanism of an indirect tax collected by private merchants supervised by government officials endured to the mid-20th century. The salt tax enabled a weak government to sustain itself; the government need control only the few regions that produced salt. Plans to end the government monopoly on salt by 2016 were announced in 2014.

== History ==
Following the An Lushan Rebellion (756–763) revenues from the land tax began to fall. The equal-field system that sustained the land tax was undermined by the aristocracy and Buddhist monasteries acquiring large tracts of land, decreasing the amount of land which was taxable. To compensate the state found a new mechanism for the taxation of salt. In 758, Chancellor Liu Yan created a Salt and Iron Commission. Liu had already proved his worth by using impressed labor to dredge the long silted-over canal connecting the Huai and Yellow rivers; this project lowered transport costs, relieved food shortages, and increased tax revenues with little government investment. The Huai river ran through Northern Jiangsu, the location of coastal salt marshes which were the major source of salt. Liu realized that if the government could control these areas, it could sell the salt at a monopoly price to merchants, who would pass the price difference on to their customers. This monopoly price was an indirect tax which was reliably collected in advance without having to control the areas where the salt was consumed. The commission formed to oversee the new scheme was headed by the salt commissioner (yantie shi), a financial specialist, which was uncharacteristic of the Tang unspecialized political administration.

== Effects ==
Salt was to be sold only at regional offices by licensed producers, and then only to licensed merchants at marked up prices. The distribution by merchants ensured the effects of the policy penetrated into areas where the central government had limited authority. The merchants then passed on the high cost of salt to consumers. Peasants were most affected as they spent a higher percentage of their incomes on basic food goods. By 779, taxation of salt quickly accounted for over half of government revenues.

== List of salt commissioners ==
- Jian Youwen

== See also ==
- Economy of China
- Economic history of China (Pre-1911)
- Economic history of China (1912–1949)
