= Yam Bing-yee =

Chinese opera singer and actress from Hong Kong (1931–2022)

- Chinese: 任冰兒
- Born: 20 September 1931; Nanhai County, Guangdong Province, China
- Died: 21 May 2022 (aged 90)
- Other names: Bing-yee Yam, Yam Bing Ngai, Ho Heung-Leuk, Ren Binger
- Occupations: Cantonese opera singer; actress
- Years active: 1944–2016
- Known for: The Revenge Battle
- Spouse: Sek Yin-tsi
- Relatives: Yam Kim-fai (cousin)

Yam Bing-yee (Chinese: 任冰兒; 20 September 1931 – 21 May 2022) was a Chinese actress and Cantonese opera singer from Hong Kong. Yam was credited with over 150 films.

== Early life ==
In 1931, Yam was born in Nanhai County, Guangdong Province, China. Yam's cousin was Yam Kim-fai.

== Career ==
At age 11, Yam began her Cantonese opera performance. Yam studied under Yam Kim-fai. In 1948, Yam crossed over as an actress in Hong Kong films. Yam appeared in Good Girl Covers for Both Sides, a 1948 drama film and The Thirteenth Girl's Adventure in Nengren Temple, a 1948 martial arts film. Yam first appeared with Yam Kim-fai in Frolicking with a Pretty Maid in the Wineshop, a 1952 Cantonese opera film directed by Chan Pei. Yam utilized her acrobatic skills in The Golden Cat, a 1961 martial arts film directed by Lung To. Yam is known for appearing in second lead roles in the 1940s to 1960s Cantonese opera films. In 1957, Yam appeared on stage as the original cast of Sin Fung Ming Opera Company to present The Flower Princess for the first time in Hong Kong at the Lee Theater. Yam's last film was Silent Romance, a 1984 comedy film directed by Frankie Chan Fan-Kei.

== Awards ==
- 2011 Award for Outstanding Contribution in Arts, Hong Kong Arts Development Awards.

== Filmography ==
=== Films ===
This is a partial list of films.

- 1948 Good Girl Covers for Both Sides
- 1948 The Thirteenth Girl's Adventure in Nengren Temple
- 1952 Frolicking with a Pretty Maid in the Wineshop
- 1958 The Merry Phoenix
- 1959 The Fairy of Ninth Heaven
- 1959 The Purple Hairpin (aka Zi chai ji)
- 1961 The Golden Cat
- 1963 Funny Thief
- 1964 The Pitiless Sword (aka The Revenge Battle)
