= The Wild, Wild Rose =

1960 British Hong Kong film by Wong Tin-lam

- Theatrical release poster
- Traditional Chinese: 野玫瑰之戀
- Directed by: Wong Tin-lam
- Written by: Chun Yik-foo
- Based on: Carmen by Georges Bizet
- Produced by: Chung Kai-man; Stephen Soong; Ma Suk-yung
- Starring: Grace Chang; Chang Yang
- Cinematography: Wong Ming
- Edited by: Wong Chiu-hei
- Music by: Yao Min; Ryōichi Hattori
- Production company: Motion Picture & General Investment Co. Ltd.
- Release date: 4 October 1960 (Hong Kong)
- Running time: 128 minutes
- Country: Hong Kong
- Language: Mandarin

The Wild, Wild Rose (traditional Chinese: 野玫瑰之戀; simplified Chinese: 野玫瑰之恋; pinyin: yě méiguī zhī liàn; Wade–Giles: Yeh-mei-kui chih-lien; Jyutping: je5 mui4 gwai3 zi1 lyun2; lit. 'Romance of the Wild Rose') is a 1960 Hong Kong film directed by Wong Tin-lam. The plot and some of the songs are from the opera Carmen.

== Cast and roles ==
- Grace Chang as Deng Sijia, nicknamed "The Wild Rose"
- Chang Yang as Liang Hanhua
- Auyeung Sa-fay as Hanhua's Mother
- Lui Tat as Old Wang
- Wong Loy as Shao Xueli
- Lau Yan-kap as Fatty Lin
- Ma Lik as Old Tian
- Ma Hsiao-nung as Old Wang's Wife
- Sum Wan as Li Meimei
- So Fung as Wu Suxin
- Tang Ti as Sijia's Husband
- Tien Ching as Xiao Liu

== Music ==
All the lyrics written by Lee Tsin-chin, all the songs performed by Grace Chang.

Song	Adaptation of	Music
卡門 ("Carmen")	"L'amour est un oiseau rebelle"	Sebastián Iradier
賭徒歌 ("Song of a Gambler")	"La donna è mobile"	Giuseppe Verdi
風流寡婦 ("The Dissolute Widow")	"The Merry Widow"	Franz Lehár
同情心 ("Sympathy")	Original music	Ryōichi Hattori
說不出的快活 ("Jajambo" or "Too Happy for Words")	Original music	Ryōichi Hattori
蝴蝶夫人 ("Madam Butterfly")	"Madama Butterfly"	Giacomo Puccini

== Reception ==
=== Twenty-first Century Revival and International Recognition ===
The film was revived on the English language film festival circuit from 2005. Grace Chang's performance has been particularly praised, "irresistible in her interpretation of the Carmen role" and "a marvel, with a voice that’s playful and virtuosic and a personality that can be wickedly funny or heartbreaking at the flip of a switch".
