= The Greatest Wedding on Earth =

1962 Hong Kong film by Tian-Lin Wang

- Film poster
- Directed by: Wong Tin-lam
- Screenplay by: Eileen Chang; Chor Yuen
- Produced by: Robert Chung
- Starring: Bai Louming; Kelly Lai Chen; Ching Cheung
- Cinematography: Fan Chieh
- Edited by: Wang Chao-Hsi
- Music by: Liu Hongyuan
- Production company: Motion Picture & General Investment
- Release date: 11 October 1962 (Hong Kong)
- Running time: 108 minutes
- Country: Hong Kong
- Language: Mandarin

The Greatest Wedding on Earth (aka Nan bei yi jia qin, Chinese: 南北一家亲) is a 1962 Hong Kong comedy film directed by Tian-Lin Wang, and written by Eileen Chang and Yuen Chor.

== Plot ==
A rivalry between two local restaurateurs (one serving Cantonese food and one serving northern cuisine) heats up when their children decide to get married.

== Cast ==
- Bai Louming as Shen Peiming
- Kelly Lai Chen as Li Huanxiang
- Ching Cheung as Shen Qingwen
- Leung Sing-po as Shen Jianbing
