= Wong Tin-lam =

Chinese film director from Hong Kong (1927–2010)

Wong Tin-Lam
- Born: 11 September 1927; Shanghai
- Died: 16 November 2010 (aged 83); Hong Kong
- Other name: Wang Tianlin
- Occupations: screenwriter; film director; film producer; actor
- Spouse: Leung Shuk Man (m. 1954–2003)
- Children: 1
- Relatives: Wong Jing (son)
- Awards: Asia-Pacific Film Festival Best Director Award; 1959 All in the FamilyGolden Bauhinia Awards – Life Achievement Award; 2002

Chinese name
- Chinese: 王天林
Transcriptions
Standard Mandarin
- Hanyu Pinyin: Wáng Tiānlín
Yue: Cantonese
- Jyutping: wong4 tin1 lam4
- Musical career

Wong Tin-Lam (1927–16 November 2010) was a Chinese screenwriter, producer, director, and actor, who has contributed to the Hong Kong cinema scene with a career spanning six decades. He has made films in Cantonese, Mandarin and Amoy dialect.

== Career ==
Wong began as a film director in the mid-1950s, working for the Hsin Hwa Motion Picture Company (renamed to Xinhua Film Company in 1957).

Wong later joined Cathay Organisation. When Cathay Studios was shut down in the early 1970s, Wong continued to establish himself as a filmmaker, making TV drama serials by combining film production techniques with the flexibility of television production, and became a trendsetter in melodrama and wuxia serials.

Wong retired from the television production scene, and in his later career could be seen in appearances and supporting roles in films directed by Johnnie To, Wai Ka-Fai and his son, Wong Jing, who has followed in his footsteps.

After a period of illness, Wong died on 16 November 2010 from organ failure.

== Filmography ==
This is a partial list of films.

- 1953 The Film World's Merry Song (aka Stand Up and Cheer, The Very Best from Show Biz) - Director.
- 1960 The Wild, Wild Rose - Director
- 1962 It's Always Spring - Record company manager.
- 1962 The Greatest Wedding on Earth - Director
- 1971 The Chase - Director
