= Jian Youwen =

Chinese historian (1896–1978)

Jian Youwen Jen Yu-wen
- 簡又文
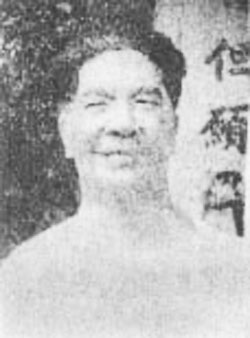
- Jian Youwen (taken before 1949)
- Born: 1896; Xinhui, Guangdong, Qing China
- Died: October 25, 1978 (aged 81–82); Hong Kong
- Other names: Jen Yu-wen, Kan Yau-man
- Occupations: Historian, public official, religious leader

Academic background
- Education: Oberlin College (B.A); University of Chicago (M.A.)

Academic work
- Discipline: History
- Sub-discipline: Chinese history
- Institutions: Yenching University; Yale University (visiting scholar); University of Hong Kong
- Main interests: Taiping Rebellion, Christianity in China
Jian Youwen
- Traditional Chinese: 簡又文
- Simplified Chinese: 簡又文
Transcriptions
Standard Mandarin
- Hanyu Pinyin: Jiǎn Yòuwén
- Wade–Giles: Chien^{3} Yu^{4}-wen^{2}
Yue: Cantonese
- Jyutping: Gaan^{2} Jau^{6}man^{4}
other Yue
- Taishanese: Gan^{2} Yiu^{5}mun^{3}

Jian Youwen (1896 – 1978 simplified Chinese: 简又文; traditional Chinese: 簡又文; pinyin: Jiǎn Yòuwén, sometimes transliterated Jen Yu-wen or Kan Yau-man in older documents) was a Chinese historian, public official, and sometime Methodist pastor, known in particular for his writings on the Taiping Heavenly Kingdom. He taught at Yenching University, the University of Hong Kong, and Yale University.

== Life and career ==
Jian was born in Guangdong in 1896, the son of Jian Yinchu and Jian Wenliu, and educated at Lingnan School, where he was baptized as a Christian. His older brother, Kan Tat-Choy, became a wealthy entrepreneur and later built St. Mary's Episcopal Church in Causeway Bay. In 1914, Jian attended Oberlin College where he earned his undergraduate degree in 1917, and obtained his master's degree from the University of Chicago in 1919, then returned to China in 1921. In 1922, he accepted a position as General Editor at the Hong Kong YMCA's publications division, and in 1924 was appointed associate professor of religion at Yenching University, a post he held until 1927.

Jian joined the Nationalist Party in 1926 and developed a close relationship with General Feng Yuxiang, the "Christian Warlord", who appointed him head of his political department in 1927. After that party formed a government the same year, ushering what is known as the Nanjing decade, Jian held a variety of posts including salt commissioner, overseeing the traditional salt monopoly. His interest in politics grew, and from 1933 to 1946 he was a member of the Legislative Yuan. He recalled his experiences with the Kuomintang in his biography, 西北从军记 (Xibei congjun ji, Record of my military days in the northwest), which was published posthumously in 1982.

Jian’s work in Chinese culture brought him close to many important artists. While in Mengshan, he served as a private tutor to the young Chen Wentong, who later gained fame as a wuxia writer under the pen name Liang Yusheng. He was a student and later close friend to the artist Gao Jianfu and, according to Eliza Ho, was an important influence on his work. In 1954, he wrote the libretto for a Cantonese opera with nationalist themes, 萬世流芳張玉喬 (The Immortal Zhang Yuqiao, the Most Respectable Courtesan). The opera is considered a contemporary classic of Chinese opera, and was premiered in the same year by the Sun Yim Yeung troupe. The production was directed by the celebrated composer and film director Tang Ti-sheng. He also found time to publish and edit two important literary magazines, 易經 (Yijing, in Shanghai and edited by Yao Xiexing), and Typhoon (in Hong Kong) during the 1930s. Yijing had a partial focus on humor, and Jian launched the journal in 1933 in coordination with the launch of 宇宙鋒 (Yuzhou Feng, Cosmic (sword) Edge) by his friend and colleague Lin Yutang. Consequently, 1933 was commonly described in Chinese literary circles as "The Year of Humor". Socially, Jian was renowned as a talented reteller of the coarse humor of the traitor Han Fuju. Later, in 1946, he founded and became first director-general of the Guangdong Institute of History and Culture.

In 1949, Jian returned to Hong Kong where he became a professor at Hong Kong University. He was a visiting fellow at Yale from 1964 to 1965, the institution that now houses the Jen Yu-Wen Papers. He died in Hong Kong in 1978. His wife, Mabel Yuk-Sein Young, with whom he had two sons and two daughters, died in 1958.

== Academic work ==
Jian was renowned mainly for his expertise on the Taiping Heavenly Kingdom, and was one of the first scholars to take a serious interest in the period. His Taiping tianguo dianzhi tongkao (太平天國典制通考) was published as a three-volume work in Hong Kong by Mengjin Shuwu in 1957, and by Yale University as a single volume in 1978, translated by W J F Jenner as The Taiping Revolutionary Movement. He wrote several other works on the Taiping period, all of which are considered authoritative.

Jian, an esteemed art collector of works from the Ming and Qing Dynasties, and of Guangdong art, was the largest collector of Gao Jianfu's work, and assembled them as the "pavilion of one hundred swords" (百劍樓, Bǎi jiàn lōu), a collection which formed the basis of his 1972 chronology of Gao. Unfortunately, financial difficulties in the 1970s forced him to sell part of the collection through Sotheby's. His work on Gao's art has formed the basis of commentary since, and also ties into his work on the Taipings by emphasizing the "revolutionary" dimension of the culture of Guangdong, or its frequent role as a cradle of cultural and political innovation in China. He described Guangdong as "the origin of revolution" (革命筞涴地, gémìng cèyuàndì), and in the 1940s was active in the promotion of Guangdongese culture. The remainder of his art collection now resides at the Chinese University of Hong Kong, in its Art Museum. This single gift of over one thousand items constitutes the core of the Art Museum's holdings.

== Religious beliefs ==
Jian was a devout Christian, not only in his personal affairs but especially in public life. His interest in the Taipings was in part stimulated by their unusual adoption of Christian beliefs, but he also argued strenuously for the gradual Christianization of China. He wrote essays against the Anti-Christian movement in China, and translated Marshall Broomhall's biography of Robert Morrison, the first Protestant missionary to the country, as well as biologist John Merle Coulter's Religion and Science. Countering the perception that Christianity, as a western faith, was harmful to China, Jian argued that Christianity could be shaped as a revolutionary force in a republican China.

His best-known concrete action in this regard occurred when he became Director of the Guangzhou Bureau of Social Affairs in 1931. He inherited a proposal from his predecessor to convert the Guangzhou City god temple, which he saw as a relic of a superstitious and backward era, into a secular facility to promote the consumption of goods produced in Guangdong. Although the provincial government supported the change, the conversion was highly unpopular with local citizens and in particular the temple's fortune-tellers, who alternately threatened and bribed Jian. Nonetheless he prevailed; the temple was converted, and many of its artefacts were dispersed to local government offices and the YMCA.
