= Hong Kong Movie Database =

Hong Kong online movie database

Hong Kong Movie Database (HKMDB)
- Website type: Online movie database
- Available in: English, Chinese
- Website: www.hkmdb.com
- Commercial: No
- Launched: November 1, 1995; 30 years ago
- Current status: Active

The Hong Kong Movie Database (HKMDB) is a bilingual (English and Chinese) website started in 1995 by Ryan Law. It provides a repository for information about movies originating from Hong Kong and the people who created them.

The database was initially populated with data on over 6000 films, and reviews from the defunct database hosted at egret0.stanford.edu. In subsequent years it has expanded to contain information on more than 20,000 films and nearly 100,000 people, and includes films mainly from Taiwan and China. Additionally, Chinese-language Malaysian and Singaporean movies and few films from other countries (mainly from Hollywood) co-produced by Hong Kong, Chinese and Taiwanese film companies are also included in the database.

== Overview ==
HKMDB contains information about films, people, and companies associated with Hong Kong cinema. This includes detailed film credits for cast and crew members as well as image and portrait galleries. The site also includes user-submitted film reviews.

The database is bilingual, so movies, people and companies are required to have both Chinese and English information. Additional information about individual films such as production companies, release dates, and languages spoken is included where known. Information about cast and crew members may include gender, birth dates and brief biographies. In all cases, names of people, films and companies are in Chinese, Romanized Chinese, and English.

There are more than 340,000 images in the database. Images can be associated with movies, companies, or people. The images serve primarily as an aid in identification.

Database information can only be modified by an HKMDB editor.

The core of the HKMDB editorial team consists primarily of the "Eight Immortals of HKMDB"—content editors, all of whom have been working on updating and maintaining the site's information for nearly 20 years. The HKMDB editorial team has also included many others and the site encourages interested persons to join the editorial team.

Starting in 2014, the HKMDB became a completely non-remunerative site. It is open and free from ads.
