= Lai-Zhen Yu =

Chinese actress and Cantonese opera singer from Hong Kong

- 余麗珍
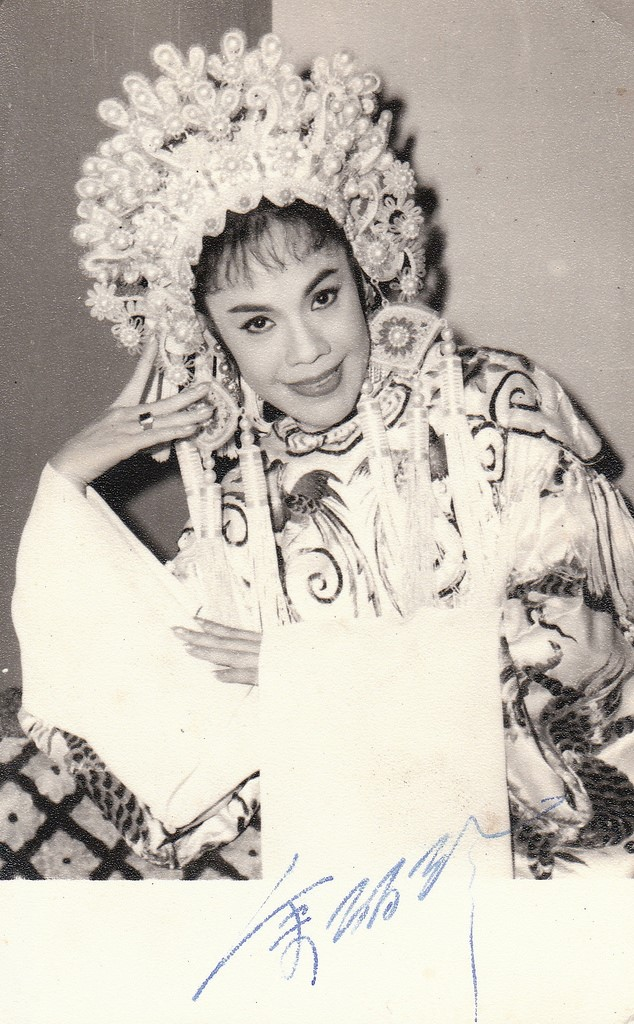
- Yu in the 1950s
- Born: 1915; Guangdong, China
- Died: 2004 (aged 88–89)
- Other names: Chiu Lai Jan, Yu Lai-Chun, Yu Lai-jan, Yu Lai-Zhen
- Occupations: Actress; Cantonese opera singer
- Years active: 1947–1967
- Known for: Co-founder of Lishi Film Production Company
- Spouse: Lee Siu-wan

Lai-Zhen Yu (Chinese: 余麗珍; 1915–2004) was a former Chinese actress and Cantonese opera singer from Hong Kong. Yu is credited with over 140 films.

== Early life ==
In 1923, Yu was born in Guangdong, China.

== Career ==
At age 16, Yu performed Cantonese opera. Yu performed Cantonese opera in the United States, South East Asia, and Hong Kong. In Hong Kong, Yu co-founded Guanghua Opera Troupe. In 1947, Yu crossed over as an actress in Hong Kong films. Yu first appeared in Cuckoo's Spirit in March, a 1947 Drama film directed by Hung Suk-Wan. In 1959, Yu co-founded Lishi Film Production Company. Yu is known for her role as the Headless Queen in Cantonese opera films. In 1968, Yu retired from the film industry.

Yu's last film was The Plot, a 1967 Historical Drama film directed by Wong Hok-Sing. Yu is credited with over 140 films.

== Repertoire ==
- The God's Story
- An Agnostic and Sagacious Intercession
- Emperor's Nocturnal Sacrifice (debut opposite Sun Ma Sze Tsang)
- The Crab Beauty (Fantasy)
- The Skeleton Tower under the Sea (Fantasy)

== Filmography ==
=== Films ===
This is a partial list of films.

- 1947 Cuckoo's Spirit in March
- 1951 A King Speaks His Heart
- 1959 The Maid Who led an Expedition to conquer the West (See Yang Paifeng)
- 1963 The Prince Becomes a Monk
- 1967 The Plot (a.k.a. Teaching the Son to Slay the Emperor, Revenge of the Prince) - Cuckoo, Lau's wife

== Personal life ==
Yu's husband was Lee Siu-wan, a writer for films. Within the Cantonese Opera community, Lee was also part of the establishment. He explained at a press conference how applications of new performers for Barwo membership were blocked until weeks before their scheduled (1 July 1972) performances.

After retirement, Yu immigrated to Canada. On 4 March 2004, Yu died.

== Discography ==
- CR-2063, Emperor's Nocturnal Sacrifice
