= Luo Pinchao =

Cantonese opera stage actor (1912–2010)

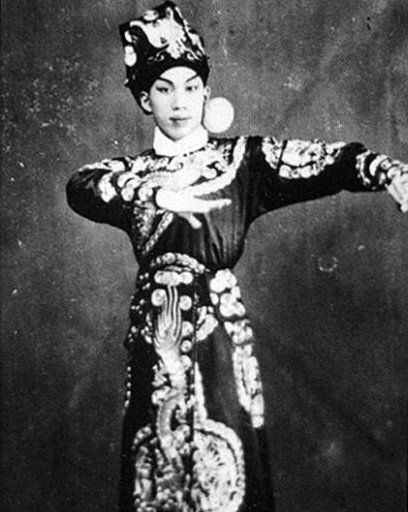
- Luo Pinchao in costume, 1931
- Born: June 1912
- Died: 15 July 2010 (aged 98); Guangzhou, Guangdong, China
- Organizations: Singer; stage actor
- Style: Cantonese opera
- Spouse: Huang Bao-Qiong (m. 1944; died 1982)
- Children: 1

Luo Pinchao (Note: Chinese: 羅品超; pinyin: luo^{2} pin^{3} chao^{1}; Jyutping: lo^{4} ban^{2} ciu^{1}; born Chinese: 羅肇鑒; pinyin: luo^{2} zhao^{4} jian^{4}; Jyutping: lo^{4} siu^{6} gaam^{3}) (June 1912 – 15 July 2010) was a Cantonese opera stage actor who started to perform, as his career choice, in 1930. He was eventually recognized as the world's oldest opera singer by Guinness World Records.

Pinchao died in Guangzhou on 15 July 2010, aged 98.

== Career ==
Pinchao returned to mainland China upon the founding of the People's Republic of China (PRC), bringing along fellow convinced performers. There, he joined the Chinese Communist Party and eventually became intellectual property of the State (國寶). He was front and center on stage only when first returned to perform in Hong Kong with peer performers in the late 1970s. He shared the stage and spotlight with PRC troupes of up-and-coming performers all over the world after those few performances.

By 1988, planned succession for offices was already in full force. Through communal spirit (instead of individual idolization or personal branding) among the Pinchao generation (grandfathered into the system in the 1950s), the Cultural Revolution and various other events, gone in this arena was life tenure. Collusion among the elders found in some other mainland Chinese Opera genre still, Hong Kong and all over the world generally in Cantonese opera, The Dog in the Manger, didn't survive in PRC.

True to his motto "life-long learning approach" (1988 biography), Pinchao continued the journey in the US, learning English as a Second Language (ESL). (Unadulterated by interpreter, as to whether Fong Yim Fun, his former co-star on stage and in films, can move at will between Cantonese and English or not, is not known.) He gave lessons (to all, regardless of descent and nationality) in Chinatown while living in New York, USA since 1988 for citizenship. Bookends of his time (from inaugural as Vice-Chancellor in 1958 to artistic director in 1988) spent teaching in State training school are:

- Tsoi Kwok Hing, the first crop of graduates in the 1960s
- Ting Fan (retired recently from office in 2017 at 63 years old) whom he hand-picked for training in the late 1970s

Pinchao reportedly had lost count how many he groomed over decades of teaching when performed with six generations of students at one point. Performance on stage had been few and far between.

Later in life, he returned to give lessons and advised his former students who held political offices and responsibilities he left behind (for example, as artistic director at the Guangdong Cantonese Opera Institution in 1988) during his yearly returns to mainland. He had one apprentice and professional successor; a young student who is the granddaughter of a close friend named Bai Yanzi (白燕仔), since 82 years old.

=== Selected repertoire ===
- "Luo Cheng at the Gate" (羅成叫關) – often known as "Lauo Cheng Writing a Letter" to emphasize the hour-long scene with Pinchao standing on one foot while writing a letter with his character's own blood.

- "Bandits of Shandong Province" (山東響馬) – Pinchao was known for the scene in which the ride (a horse, the art of abstraction) was bridled and saddled (配馬).

=== Selected filmography ===
- White Poplar, Red Tears
- Hongling's Blood (Part 1)
- Hongling's Blood (Part 2)

=== Selected excerpts ===
- "Meeting at the Tower", Butterfly Lovers
- "Waiting for the Moon in the Western Chamber", Romance of the Western Chamber

== Personal life ==
- Married (1944–1982) to Huang Bao-Qiong (Chinese: 黃寶瓊; pinyin: huang^{2} bao^{3} qiong^{2}; Jyutping: wong^{4} bou^{2} king^{4}) until her death and produced one son.

== Biography ==
- Lingyu, Liu (1990). 羅品超奇傳 [The Legend of Luo Pinchao] (in Chinese). Hong Kong Weekly Publishing House. OCLC 45637650 – via Google Books.
