= Grace Chang =

Hong Kong-Chinese actress and singer (1933–2026)

- 葛蘭
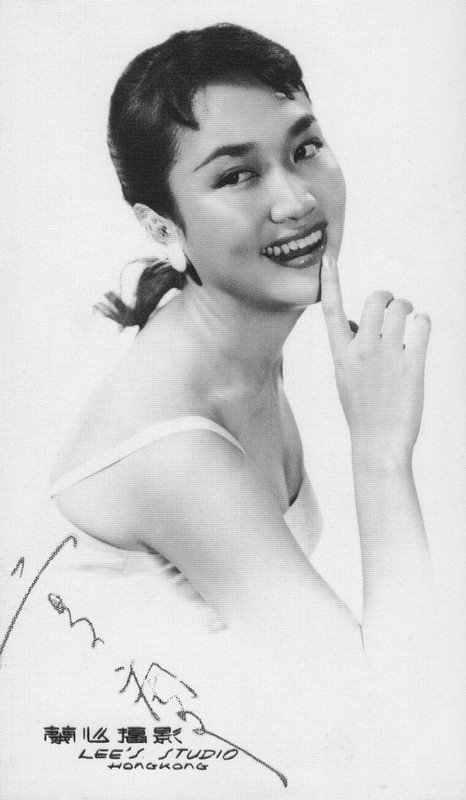
- Born: 張玉芳; 13 June 1933; Nanjing, Jiangsu, China
- Died: 3 August 2026 (aged 93); Hong Kong
- Other name: Ko Lan
- Occupations: Singer; actress
- Spouse: Ko Fook Chuen (m. 1961; died 2003)

Chinese name
- Traditional Chinese: 葛蘭
- Simplified Chinese: 葛兰
Transcriptions
Standard Mandarin
- Hanyu Pinyin: Gě Lán

Grace Chang (born Zhāng Yùfāng (simplified Chinese: 张玉芳; traditional Chinese: 張玉芳); 13 June 1933 – 3 August 2026), known in Chinese as Ko Lan (葛蘭), was a Hong Kong actress and singer. She was a popular idol in the 1950s, especially among students and the middle class.

Chang was a renowned Cathay Organization actress with many successes including It Blossoms Again; The Wild, Wild Rose; and Mambo Girl. Chang appeared in 33 films during her eleven-year acting career. Her last film appearance was in 1964, though she provided vocals for soundtracks.

== Life and career ==
Chang was a Haining, Zhejiang native, who was born in Nanjing and grew up in Shanghai. In 1948 Chang moved to Hong Kong with her father. The great singer-actress Chow Hsuan was her idol.

Her stage name was Ko Lan (Gě Lán in Pinyin), an approximation of her English name Grace. She underwent vocal training in her childhood. Her acting career began with Taishan Pictures where she starred in her debut show Seven Sisters in 1952.

In 1961, Chang married Ko Fook Chuen in London, England. Chang retired from acting in 1964.

A biography was written about her career, titled The Life of Grace Chang.

Chang died in Hong Kong on 3 August 2026 at the age of 93.

== Filmography ==
- Seven Sisters (1953)
- Red Bloom in the Snow (1954)
- Blood-Stained Flowers (1954)
- It Blossoms Again (1954)
- Soldier of Fortune (1955)
- Surprise (1956)
- The ingenious Seduction (1956)
- The Long Lane (1956)
- Over the Rolling Hills (1956)
- The Story of a Fur Coat (1956)
- Mambo Girl (1957)
- Booze, Boobs and Bucks (1957)
- Love and Crime (1957)
- Murder in the Night (1957)
- Torrents of Desire (1958)
- Golden Phoenix (1958)
- Crimes of Passion (1959)
- Spring Song (1959)
- Air Hostess (1959)
- Our Dream Car (1959)
- My Darling Sister (1959)
- The Girl With a Thousand Faces (1960)
- The June Bride (1960)
- Forever Yours (1960)
- The Loving Couple (1960)
- Miss Pony-Tail (1960)
- The Wild, Wild Rose (1960)
- Sun, Moon and Star (1961)
- Sun, Moon and Star Part 2 (1961)
- Because of Her (1963)
- The Magic Lamp (1964)
- A Story of Three Loves Part 1 (1964)
- A Story of Three Loves Part 2 (1964)
- The Hole (1998) (soundtrack only)
- The Wayward Cloud (2005) (soundtrack only)
- Kala Malam Bulan Mengambang (2008) (soundtrack only)
- Crazy Rich Asians (2018) (soundtrack only)
