= Leung Sing Poh =

Hong Kong actor and Cantonese opera singer

Leung Sing Poh MBE
- 梁醒波
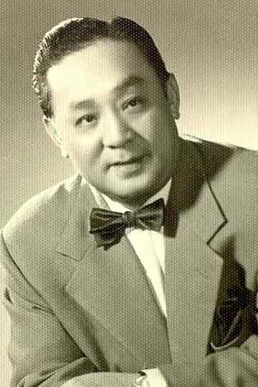
- Leung in the 1960s
- Born: Leung Guang Choy (梁廣才); 1908; Singapore, Straits Settlements
- Died: February 12, 1981 (aged 72–73); British Hong Kong
- Other names: Leung Sing-Bo, Leung Sing-Po, Leung Sin-Po, Leung Sing-por, Leung Sing-boh, Liang Xingbo, Por Suk, Uncle Por
- Occupation: Actor
- Spouse: Koo Man-kuen
- Children: 7
- Father: Leong Yuet
- Relatives: Leung Po Ching 梁葆貞, Leung Po Man 梁葆文, Leung Po Chu 梁寶珠

Chinese name
- Traditional Chinese: 梁醒波
- Simplified Chinese: 梁醒波
Transcriptions
Standard Mandarin
- Hanyu Pinyin: Liáng Xǐngbō
- Musical career
- Also known as: Leung Yu Hoi (梁如海)

Leung Sing Poh MBE (Chinese: 梁醒波; born 1908 – 12 February 1981) was a Hong Kong actor, host and former Cantonese opera performer. Leung was a pioneer actor of TVB, and was also the former chairman of Chinese Artist Association of Hong Kong from 1965 to 1970. He was nicknamed "Por Suk" or "Uncle Por", and was credited with over 440 films. He had a star at Avenue of Stars in Hong Kong.

== Early life ==
Leung was born as Leung Guang Choy in Singapore in 1908. Leung was devoted to Cantonese Opera ever since he was young. Leung loved the legendary Ma Sze Tsang (Chinese: 馬師曾) and learnt the Ma style of singing Cantonese opera. His father Leong Yuet was a famous Cantonese opera performer in Singapore. Leong convinced his father to allow him to learn Cantonese opera from a Malaysian master, known as Dai Dam Kan (Big Brave Kan in Cantonese). Leung officially joined a Cantonese opera troupe at the age of 18. Leung started acting in Wusheng roles which made him very popular and one of the members of the Nanyang four kings of Cantonese opera.

== Career ==
Leung was discovered by Ma Sze Tsang. In 1939, Ma Sze Tsang's Taiping troupe in Hong Kong needed actors, he invited Leung to join the Taiping troupe. In 1940, Leung became a Cantonese opera performer in Hong Kong. During the World War II, when the Japanese attacked Hong Kong, Leung brought his family to escape to Guangzhou to Macau then to Guangxi At Guangxi, he formed a Cantonese opera troupe there and performed in various towns of Guangxi. After the world war, Leung started to gain weight, and was unsuitable for acting Wusheng anymore, and thus changed to Chousheng (clown) in which he portrayed villainous and also funny roles in cantonese opera, acting in several famous Cantonese Opera troupes, Leung thus gained the reputation of being "Chousheng Wang" or Clown King in Cantonese opera.

In 1941, Leung crossed over as an actor in Hong Kong films. Leung first appeared in Chaos in the Universe, a 1941 comedy film directed by Cheung Oi-Man. Leung was known for his role as Silly Wong in Silly Wong Growing Rich, 1960 comedy film directed by Chu Kei. Leung's last film was The Hong Kong Tycoon, a 1979 Drama film directed by Cecille Tong. Leung is credited with over 440 films.

Leung is one of the pioneer actors of TVB. Leung hosted the popular Enjoy Yourself Tonight show in Hong Kong for many years till his death.

=== Chinese Artist Association of Hong Kong ===
From 1965 to 1970, Leung was the chairman of Chinese Artist Association of Hong Kong, an association of Hong Kong Cantonese opera artists. Leung contributed greatly to the Hong Kong Cantonese opera industry.

== Filmography ==
=== Films ===
This is a partial list of films.

- 1950 Lust of a Grand Lady - Lau Kai
- 1961 The Greatest Civil War on Earth
- 1962 The Greatest Wedding on Earth (南北一家亲)
- 1974 Naughty! Naughty! (綽頭狀元)
- 1976 Princess Chang Ping - Chou Chung / Chow Chung

=== Television ===
- 1967 Enjoy Yourself Tonight

== Awards ==
- 1977 MBE for his artistic contributions towards Cantonese Opera – Presented by Governor Murray MacLehose on 13 April 1977
- Star – Avenue of Stars, Tsim Sha Tsui waterfront in Hong Kong

== Personal life ==
Leung's wife was Koo Man-kuen. They have seven children, four girls and three boys.

Three of Leung's daughters became actresses. Leung Po-Ching is an actress known for portraying a housewife in EYT, Margaret Leung Po-man (Man Lan) - actress with movie opposite Bruce Lee, and Leung Po-Chu - another Cantonese opera performer.

On 12 February 1981, Leung died of colorectal cancer at the age of 73.

Preceded by Mak Bing-wing	Chairman of the Chinese Artist Association of Hong Kong; 1965-1970	Succeeded by Liza Wang
