= Chinese Artists Association of Hong Kong =

Hong Kong non-profit association

Chinese Artists Association of Hong Kong (Chinese: 香港八和會館) is a non-profit association of Cantonese opera groups and artists in Hong Kong, established in the 1880s.

In 1953, it registered as an organization in Hong Kong. It is a professional organisation for Cantonese opera performers.

It presented the Cantonese Opera Young Talent Showcase in Hong Kong from 2012 to 2015.

== Chairmen ==
Chairman of the Board of Directors
Term	Year	Chairman	Ref.
1	1953－1954	Sun Ma Sze Tsang (新馬師曾)	
2	1954－1955	Sun Ma Sze Tsang (新馬師曾)	
3	1955－1956	Sun Ma Sze Tsang (新馬師曾)	
4	1956－1957	Sun Ma Sze Tsang (新馬師曾)	
5	1957－1958	Kwan Tak-hing (關德興)	
6	1958－1959	Kwan Tak-hing (關德興)	
7	1959－1960	Kwan Tak-hing (關德興)	
8	1960－1961	Kwan Tak-hing (關德興)	
9	1961－1962	Ho Fei-faan (何非凡)	
10	1962－1963	Ho Fei-faan (何非凡)	
11	1963－1964	Mak Bing-wing (麥炳榮)	
12	1964－1966	Leung Sing-Bor (梁醒波)	
13	1966－1968	Leung Sing-Bor (梁醒波)	
14	1968－1970	Leung Sing-Bor (梁醒波)	
15	1970－1972	Leung Sing-Bor (梁醒波)	
16	1972－1974	Sun Ma Sze Tsang (新馬師曾)	
17	1974－1976	Sun Ma Sze Tsang (新馬師曾)	
18	1976－1978	Leung Sing-Bor (梁醒波)	
19	1978－1980	Wong Yim (黃炎)	
20	1980－1982	Wong Yim (黃炎)	
21	1982－1984	Wong Yim (黃炎)	
22	1984－1986	Kwan Hoi-San (關海山)	
23	1986－1988	Sun Ma Sze Tsang (新馬師曾)	
24	1988－1990	Ma Kwok-chiu (馬國超)	
25	1990－1992	Ma Kwok-chiu (馬國超)	
26	1992－1994	Liza Wang (汪明荃)	
27	1994－1997	Liza Wang (汪明荃)	
28	1997－1999	Chan Kim Sing (陳劍聲)	
29	1999－2001	Chan Kim Sing (陳劍聲)	
30	2001－2003	Chan Kim Sing (陳劍聲)	
31	2003－2005	Chan Kim Sing (陳劍聲)	
32	2005－2007	Chan Kim Sing (陳劍聲)	
33	2007－2009	Liza Wang (汪明荃)	
34	2009－2011	Liza Wang (汪明荃)	
35	2011－2013	Liza Wang (汪明荃)	
36	2013－2015	Liza Wang (汪明荃)	
37	2015－2017	Liza Wang (汪明荃)	
38	2017－2020	Liza Wang (汪明荃)	
39	2020－2023	Liza Wang (汪明荃)	
40	2023－2026	Loong Koon-tin (龍貫天)	
