= Hung Sin Nui =

Chinese actress and opera singer (1924–2013)

- Chinese: 紅線女
- Born: Kwong Kin-lim (Chinese: 鄺健廉); 25 December 1924; Guangzhou, China
- Died: 8 December 2013 (aged 88); Guangzhou, China
- Other names: Hong Xian Nü, Hong Sin Lui, Hung Hsien Nü, Hong Sin Loi
- Occupations: Actress, Cantonese opera Singer
- Spouse(s): Ma Sze-tsang (1944–55), Hua Shan (1970–85)
- Musical career
- Origin: Kaiping
- Genres: Cantonese opera

Chinese name
- Traditional Chinese: 紅線女
- Simplified Chinese: 红线女
- Literal meaning: Red-line Girl
Transcriptions
Standard Mandarin
- Hanyu Pinyin: Hóngxiàn Nǚ
- Wade–Giles: Hung^{2}-Hsien^{4} Nü^{3}
Yue: Cantonese
- Jyutping: Hung^{4}-Sin^{3} Neoi^{5}
other Yue
- Taishanese: Huung^{3}-Lhen^{1} Nui^{2}

Birth name
- Traditional Chinese: 鄺健廉
- Simplified Chinese: 邝健廉
Transcriptions
Standard Mandarin
- Hanyu Pinyin: Kuàng Jiànlián
- Wade–Giles: K'uang^{4} Chien^{4}-lien^{2}
Yue: Cantonese
- Jyutping: Kwong^{3} Gin^{6}-lim^{4}
other Yue
- Taishanese: Fong^{1} Gen^{5}-liam^{3}

Hung Sin Nui (25 December 1924 – 8 December 2013) (Chinese: 紅線女) was a former Chinese actress and Cantonese opera singer from Hong Kong and China. Hung was a national treasure level Cantonese opera master.

== Life ==
In 1924, Hung was born as Kuang Jianlian (Kwong Kin-lim in Cantonese) in Guangzhou, China. Hung's ancestral hometown is in Kaiping, Guangdong province, China. With her aunt Ho Fu-lin as her mentor, she began to sing Cantonese opera at the age of 12. She started from Mui Heung and her first stage name was Siu Yin Hung. She took to the stage from 1939, adopting the stage name Hung Sin Nui (Red Line Girl). Red line in Chinese folk legend signifying connecting relationships, especially marriage.

Hung moved to Hong Kong during World War II which would be the beginning of her golden years. She played alongside Ma Si Tsang, her then husband and well-known Cantonese opera singer and actor in productions including The Spoiled Brat and Her Groom, Bitter Phoenix, Sorrowful Oriole and Wang Zhaojun Marries beyond the Great Wall. She established her official diva status during the period and began her movie career. Her screen debut was Unforgettable Love in 1947. Hung made 105 films in her career from 1947 to 2009, but the bulk was during the late 1940s and 1950s. Hung's notable films include The Judge Goes to Pieces, A Mother's Tears, Everlasting Love, Wilderness, The Pretty Tigress, Searching the School and Guan Hanqing.

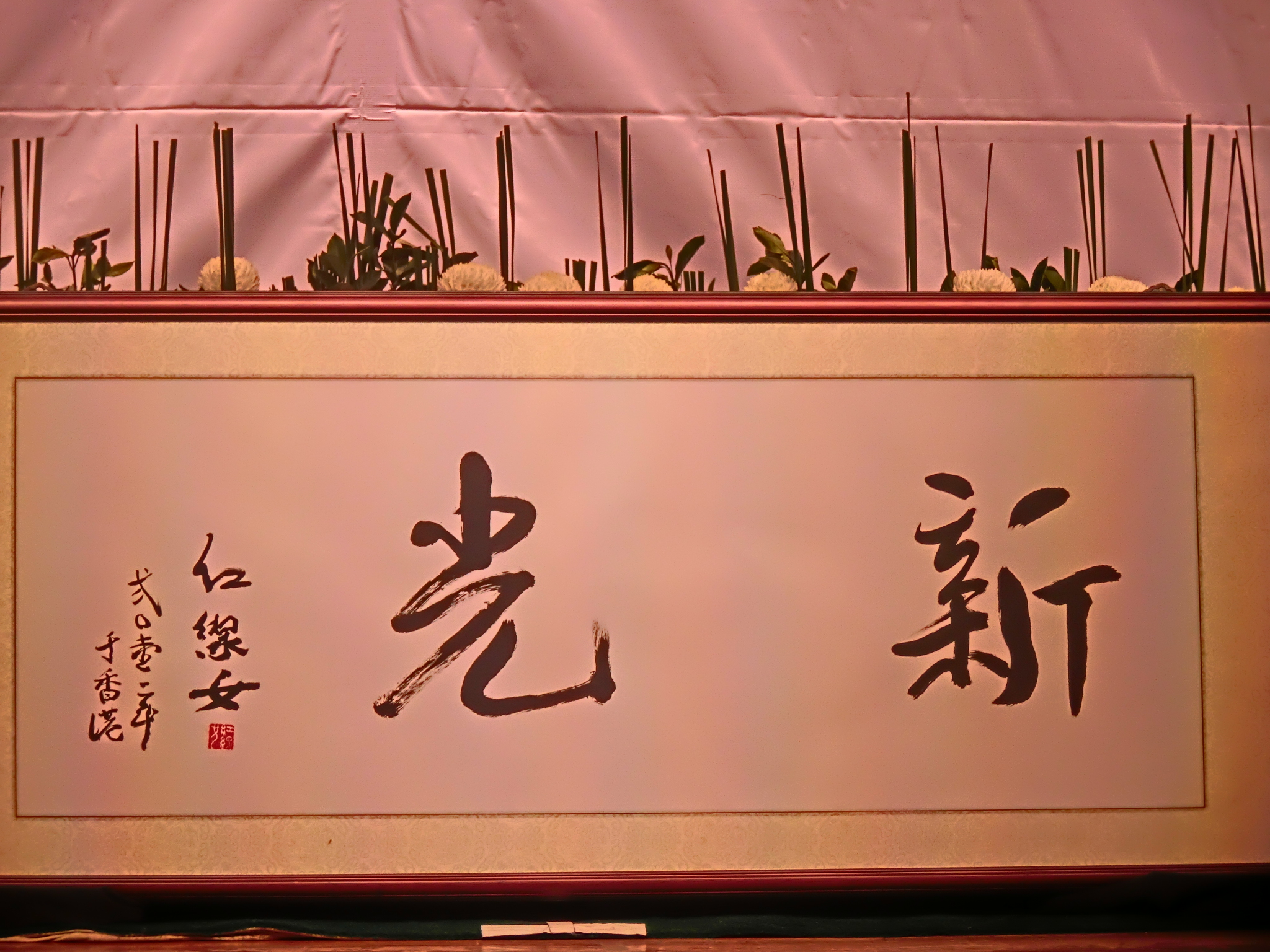
Hung's handwriting words sign of Sunbeam Theatre.

In 1955, Hung gave up her career in Hong Kong and joined the Guangdong Cantonese Opera Troupe in mainland on invitation by Premier Zhou Enlai, where she performed until 1961. She also founded the Hongdou Cantonese Opera Troupe where she trained and mentored a large number of Cantonese Opera actors and actresses. During the Cultural Revolution Hung's career was halted. She was branded as "Black Line Girl" and banished to the countryside as a street sweeper. She and her family were sent to labour camps. She recalled she would sing inside her heart at time when she was not able to sing. She would hold a note and practice when she raised chickens and no one was looking she would practice and would sing in high pitch during thunder. After the death of Mao Zedong, Hung slowly re-emerged to the Cantonese opera scene, but she appeared in two films in 1990 and 2009 before her career came a close.

== Filmography ==
=== Films ===
This is a partial list of films.

- 1947 Unforgettable Love - Kot Mo-Wah
- 1947 Love with No Result - Fong
- 1950 Lust of a Grand Lady - Ah Kwai
- 1951 Red and White Azaleas - Mei-Fung
- 1952 Red Rose, the Songstress (aka Songstress Red Rose) - Red Rose.
- 1953 A Mother's Tears
- 1954 Autumn - Maid, Chu Man.
- 1955 The Pretty Tigress - Pak Yim-Hung/Pak Lan-Chi

== Personal life ==
Hung married twice, first to well-known Cantonese opera actor Ma Si-tsang from 1944 to 1955 and then to a writer Hua Shan from 1970 to his death in 1985. Hung had two sons and a daughter from her first marriage:

- Ma Ting-cheong
- Ma Ting-sing (born 1949), military commentator and academic
- Hung Hung, daughter, a Cantonese opera star, during the Cultural Revolution she named her mother in struggle sessions. In 1981 she escaped to Taiwan and criticized the Chinese Communist government. Later she made up her relationship with Hung Sin Nui. When she immigrated to Canada she wanted to take her mother with her, but Hung Sin Nui declined.

Hung died on 8 December 2013 of a heart attack at the Guangdong General Hospital in Guangzhou, China. Hung was 88 years old. Hung is interred at Guangzhou Yihne Public Cemetery in Guangzhou, China.

== Legacy ==
Hung was regarded as one of the greatest treasures of Cantonese opera and Hong Kong cinema. She was famous for her unique sweet, crisp, smooth and coquettish "Hung tone" (紅腔) of singing which incorporated the techniques of Beijing Opera, Kunqu, and Western opera singing method. She was invited to leave a handprint at the Avenue of Stars in Hong Kong. Much of Hung's work and documents of her career are preserved at the Hung Sin-nui Arts Center in Guangzhou, which was opened in 1998 by the Guangzhou city government to commemorate and preserve her contribution to the art of Cantonese opera.

Her son Ma Ting-sing said "mother can be described as 'never abandoning or wavering, with neither complaint nor regret' toward Cantonese Opera. Whether it was in the midst of war or when the market was light, she still insisted on performing and teaching. Even when she faced 70% empty seats she still performed at will and persisted on that passion for Cantonese Opera."
