= Heroine Li Feifei =

1925 Chinese film by Runje Shaw

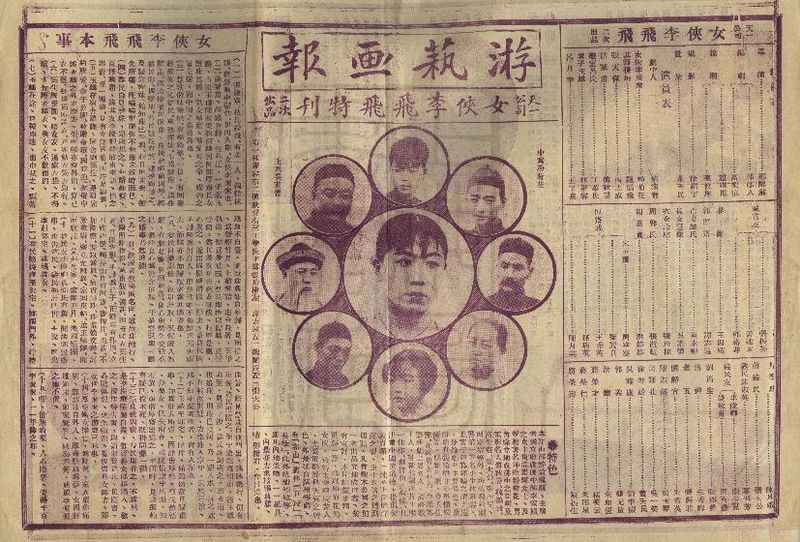
- Brochure
- Traditional Chinese: 女俠李飛飛
- Simplified Chinese: 女侠李飞飞
Transcriptions
Standard Mandarin
- Hanyu Pinyin: Nǚxiá Lǐ Fēifēi
- Wade–Giles: Nü^{3}-hsia^{2} Li^{3} Fei^{1}-fei^{1}
- Directed by: Runje Shaw
- Screenplay by: Runde Shaw; Gao Lihen
- Starring: Fen Juhua; Lin Yongrong; Wu Suxin
- Cinematography: Xu Shaoyu
- Production company: Tianyi Film Company
- Release date: 1925
- Running time: 10 reels
- Country: Republic of China
- Language: Silent

Heroine Li Feifei (Note: The film has been known in English under a variety of titles, including Heroine Li Feifei (The Chinese Mirror), Lady Knight Li Feifei (Teo 2015, p. 24), Swordswoman Li Feifei (Reynaud 2003), The Female Knight-Errant (Costanzo 2014, p. 57), and A Female Knight-Errant (Williams & Zhang 1998, p. 237).) (traditional Chinese: 女俠李飛飛; simplified Chinese: 女侠李飞飞; pinyin: Nǚxiá Lǐ Fēifēi) is a 1925 film directed by Runje Shaw for the Tianyi Film Company. Starring Fen Juhua, Lin Yongrong, and Wu Suxin, it follows a young couple who fall in love after their marriage is arranged. When a spurned suitor sullies the reputation of the bride and endangers the engagement, they are assisted by a knight-errant. The film, now lost, was reported to have been a success on release. It has been described as the first wuxia picture.

== Plot ==
The patriarch of the Hong family desires his son Yulin (Lin Yongrong) to marry a respectable woman, and thus hires a matchmaker named Chen Shu'an (Gao Lihen) to find a suitable bride. To benefit his family's public image, this woman must be virtuous and innocent, as well as beautiful. Hong Yulin is matched with Guo Huizhu (Wu Suxin), the daughter of the wealthy businessman Guo Houzhai (Tan Zhiyuan).

Seeking to win Huizhu for himself, her classmate Jiang Yimin (Zhang Dagong) decides to sabotage the relationship. He takes a picture of Huizhu during a chance meeting with Yulin, at an angle where the latter's face is not visible, and at a time when he is not wearing his usual attire. Jiang then sends it to the elder Hong with a letter besmirching Huizhu's character. Hong's father, furious, breaks off the engagement and forbids Yulin from seeing Huizhu; he does so without revealing his reasons.

Heartbroken, Huizhu attempts to kill herself, but is stopped by Li Feifei (Fen Juhua) after she flies into the courtyard. Li convinces Huizhu to maintain her spirits, then travels to the Hong home and insists that father and son speak plainly. When Yulin sees the photograph, he explains the circumstances to his embarrassed father. The engagement is restored.

== Production ==
Heroine Li Feifei was directed for the Tianyi Film Company by Runje Shaw, based on a screenplay by Runde Shaw and Gao Lihen. Cinematography was handled by Xu Shaoyu. At the time, Chinese filmmakers – drawing on the success of such imported films as The Mark of Zorro (1920), The Three Musketeers (1921), and Robin Hood (1922) – had begun producing a series of "ancient costume" films such as Heroine Li Feifei. Through films such as Heroine Li Feifei, their second, the Shaws sought to promote traditional Chinese values, as opposed to European ones.

In the title role of Li Feifei, the opera singer Fen Juhua was cast. She was known for her acrobatic work on the stage, and had gained a reputation for portraying women warriors (wudan). Further cast members included Wu Suxin, Wei Pengfei, Gao Lihen, Tan Zhiyuan, Zhang Dagong, Fu Shusheng, Zhang Lingli, Ding Huashi, and Zhou Kongkong.

== Release and reception ==
Sources differ as to the date on which Heroine Li Feifei was released, with some listing 26 December 1925 and others providing 1 January 1926. Initially, the film was advertised using a pamphlet with cast information and illustrations of its main actors. When it found popular success, a new brochure was produced, which featured photographs of the stars – with Fen Juhua in the centre – as well as a more detailed summary. This silent film was ten reels in length. Advertisements emphasised the acrobatics involved, with the character Li Feifei "zooming across rooftops and jumping up walls". Critics have noted that the film's plot draws heavily from the Mandarin Ducks and Butterflies school of literature. The film is now lost.

In his history of wuxia films, Stephen Teo describes Heroine Li Feifei as "the first wuxia picture so acknowledged by film historians". (Note: In his history of Chinese cinema, Chen Mo gives Dingjun Mountain (1905) as China's first martial arts film, arguing that despite focusing on a Chinese opera performance by Tan Xinpei the film featured no singing and involved acts of swordplay and acrobatics. Teo, conversely, describes Dingjun Mountain as an opera film (Teo 2015, p. 24). Meanwhile, the Encyclopedia of Chinese Film describes Heroine Li Feifei as merely paving the way for the genre (Williams & Zhang 1998, p. 237), together with two other films.) It thus provided a formula for the genre: "fast action, gaudy costumes, and the thrilling acrobatics of Beijing opera." Through 1931, more than 250 films in the genre were produced in Shanghai; this included The Burning of the Red Lotus Temple in eighteen episodes. Many, including Five Vengeful Girls (1928) and The Great Woman (1929), had female leads. For her contributions to the genre, Fen Juhua has been identified variously as "the first warrior woman of Shanghai cinema" and the "first of the lady knights in the Chinese cinema."

== Works cited ==
- Cheung, Milky (2019). "The 'Spring and Autumn' of Peking and Cantonese Traditions: Fen Ju Hua and the Capture of the Evil Demons". In Ng, May; Wong, Natasha (eds.). Heritage and Integration: A Study of Hong Kong Cantonese Opera Films (PDF). Translated by Ng, Rachel. Hong Kong: Hong Kong Film Archive. pp. 140–151. Archived from the original (PDF) on 23 December 2022.
- Costanzo, William V. (2014). World Cinema through Global Genres. London: John Wiley & Sons. ISBN 978-1-118-71292-4.
- Funnell, Lisa (2014). Warrior Women: Gender, Race, and the Transnational Chinese Action Star. Albany: SUNY Press. ISBN 978-1-4384-5249-4.
- "Heroine Li Feifei (1925) and "Shuomingshu"". The Chinese Mirror: A Journal of Chinese Film History. Archived from the original on 2 December 2013.
- Reynaud, Bérénice (May 2023). "The Book, the Goddess and the Hero: Sexual Politics in the Chinese Martial Arts Film". Senses of Cinema (26). Archived from the original on 19 July 2024.
- Teo, Stephen (2015). Chinese Martial Arts Cinema. Edinburgh: Edinburgh University Press. doi:10.1515/9781474403887-005. ISBN 978-1-4744-0388-7.
- Williams, Tony; Zhang, Yingjin (1998). "Martial Arts Film". In Zhang, Yingjin; Xiao, Zhiwei (eds.). Encyclopedia of Chinese Film. New York, London: Routledge. pp. 237–239. ISBN 978-0-415-15168-9.
- Yang, Jeff (2003). Once Upon a Time in China: A Guide to Hong Kong, Taiwanese, and Mainland Chinese Cinema. New York: Simon and Schuster. ISBN 978-0-7434-4817-8.
- Zhang Wei (張偉) (2009). 談影小集——中國現代影壇的塵封一隅 [A Collection of Shorts about Movies—A Dusty Corner of China's Modern Film World] (in Chinese). Showway Publishing. ISBN 978-986-221-308-7.
