= Hu Die =

Chinese actress

Hu Die Butterfly Wu
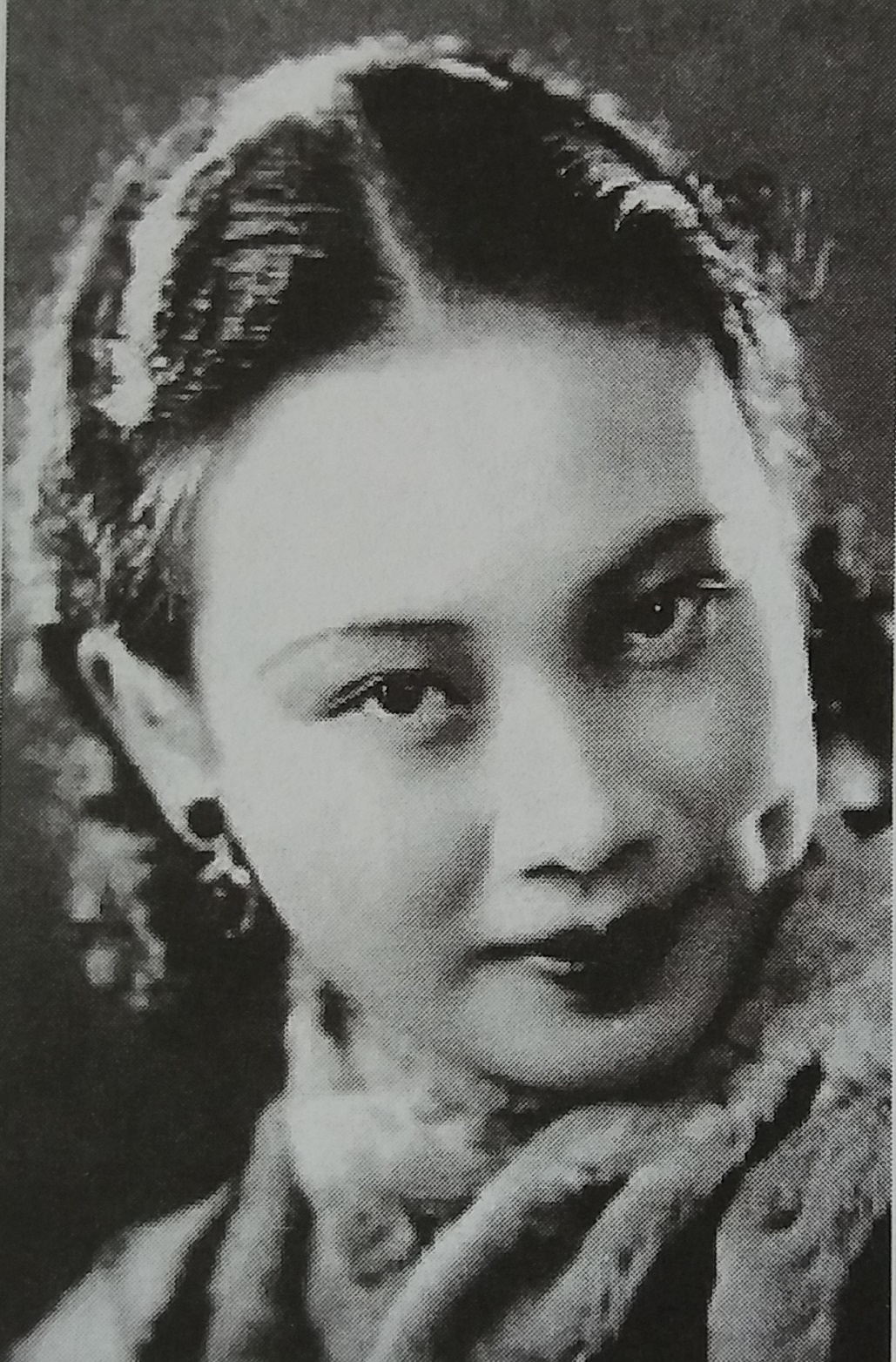
- Hu Die in the 1930s
- Born: Hu Ruihua (胡瑞华); 1907 or 1908; Shanghai, China
- Died: 23 April 1989 (aged 81); Vancouver, British Columbia, Canada
- Occupation: Actress
- Spouse: Pan Yousheng (m. 1935; died 1958)
- Children: 1

Hu Die (Chinese: 胡蝶; Wade–Giles: Hu Tieh; 1907–08 – 23 April 1989), also known by her English name Butterfly Wu, was a popular Chinese actress during the 1920s and 1930s. She was voted China's first "Movie Queen" in 1933, and won the Best Actress Award at the 1960 Asian Film Festival for her performance in Rear Door.

== Biography ==
=== Early life ===
Hu Die was born Hu Ruihua (Chinese: 胡瑞华; Wade–Giles: Hu Jui-hua) in Shanghai in 1907 or 1908, and moved to Guangzhou (Canton) when she was nine. Her father then became the general inspector of the Beijing–Fengtian Railway. She spent much of her adolescence in northern cities including Beijing, Tianjin and Yingkou, and learned to speak perfect Mandarin, which later proved to be a great advantage when the cinema of China transitioned from silent films to talkies.

In 1924, Hu Ruihua moved back to Shanghai with her family. When China (Zhonghua) Film School, the country's first film actor training school, opened, she was the first student to enroll. She adopted the professional name "Hu Die", meaning "butterfly", and Butterfly Wu in English (Wu is the Shanghainese pronunciation of Hu).

=== Early career ===
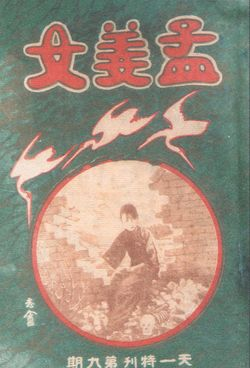
The Tianyi film Lady Meng Jiang

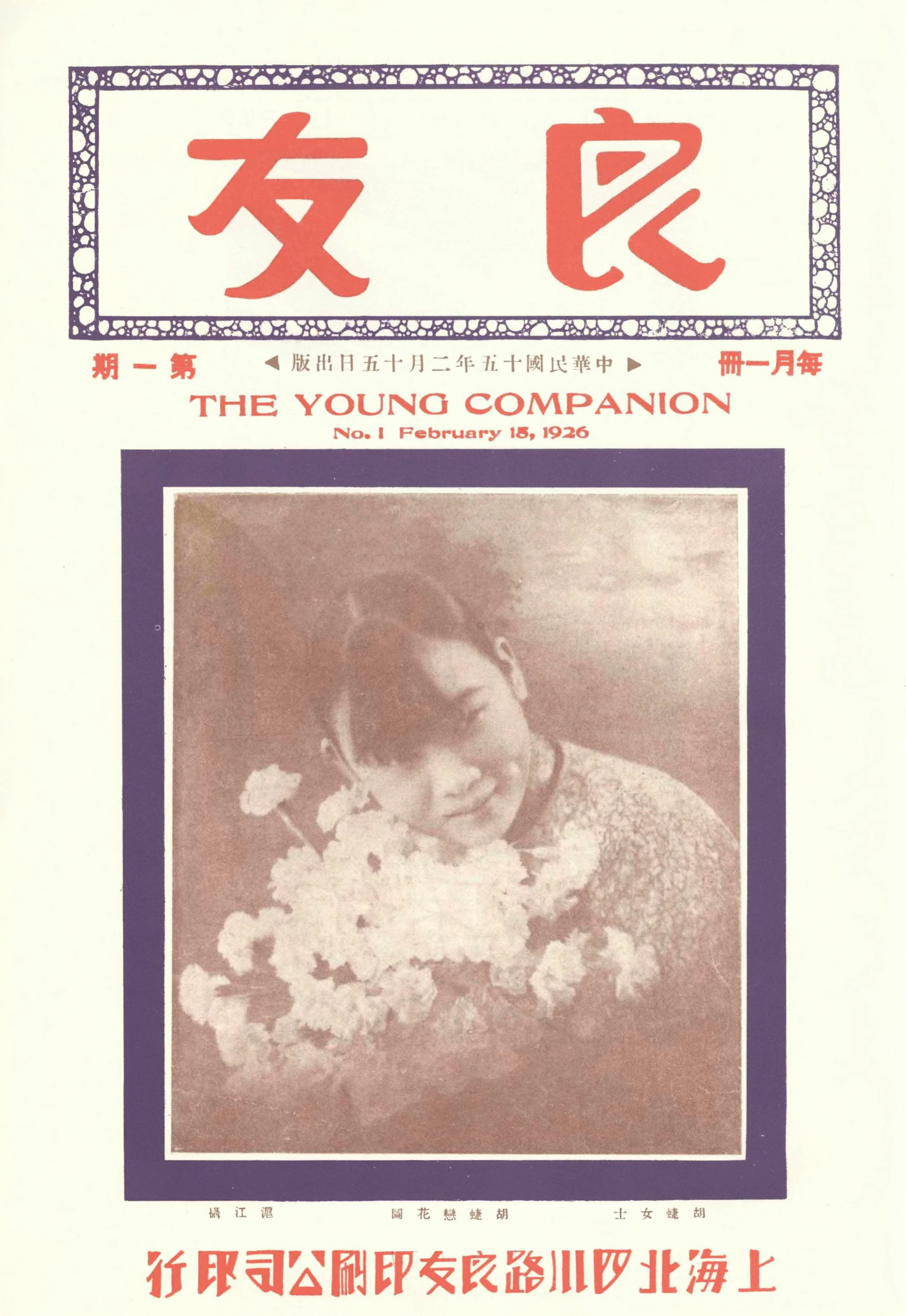
Hu Die on the cover of The Young Companion, 1926

Hu Die played her first role in the film Success, as a supporting actress. She played her first major role in the film Autumn Stirs Resentments (Qiu Shan Yuan), and fell in love with her co-star Lin Xuehuai. The relationship did not work out, and the local newspapers were filled with rumours when they broke off their engagement.

In 1926, Hu Die had her big break when she was signed by Tianyi (Unique) Film Company, one of the major studios of Shanghai, headed by Runje Shaw (Shao Zuiweng). Tianyi catered to the tastes of the common people with rapid production of films. Hu Die starred in 15 films within the two years she worked for Tianyi. Many of them, such as The Traumatic Romance of Liang and Zhu (1926) and Lady Meng Jiang (1927), were popular, but not considered artistically worthy.

=== Mingxing Studio ===
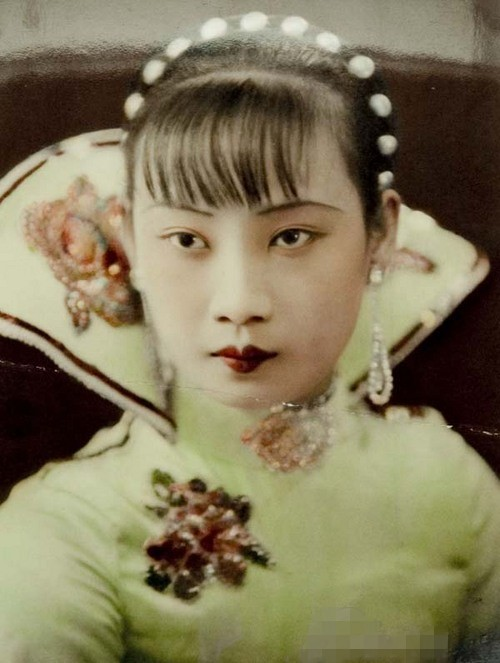
Hu Die in costume

In 1928, Hu Die declined to renew her contract with Tianyi, and signed with the rival Mingxing (Star) Film Company, led by the businessman and director Zhang Shichuan, and the writer Zheng Zhengqiu. She had a salary of $1,000 a month, a large sum at the time. Her first film with Mingxing was Tower in the White Clouds (1928). She befriended her co-star Ruan Lingyu; the two women would become China's biggest film stars of the 1930s. Her role as Red Girl in the film The Burning of the Red Lotus Temple (1928) propelled her to stardom. The film was such a success that the studio made 17 sequels of the same name between 1928 and 1931. It started a craze for martial arts films, but also attracted criticism from intellectuals when children neglected their schoolwork to study martial arts or devote themselves to martial arts fiction.

In 1931, Hu Die starred in Sing-Song Girl Red Peony (dir. Zhang Shichuan), the first Chinese sound film (although it was sound-on-disc, not sound-on-film). Compared with other silent-era film stars, who were mostly southerners with poor Mandarin, Hu Die made the transition to sound with ease. She appeared in more sound films and was able to sing in The Flower of Freedom, a real sound film of much higher quality.

Hu Die starred in Twin Sisters (Zimei Hua, dir. Zheng Zhengqiu) in 1934, in which she skilfully played the double role of twin sisters with very different personalities. The film was not only extremely popular but also won critical acclaim. It is generally considered her best film.

=== Mukden Incident ===
On 18 September 1931, Hu Die arrived in Tianjin en route to Beijing, where Mingxing was planning to shoot the film Marriage of Tears and Laughter, an adaptation of the novel by Zhang Henshui. On the same day, the Japanese engineered the Mukden Incident, and used it as pretext to launch an invasion of Manchuria. Zhang Xueliang, the "young marshal" who was the head of the northeastern army, ordered his soldiers to retreat rather than fight the Japanese. There was rumour that on the evening that the Japanese took Mukden, Marshal Zhang was dancing with Hu Die in Beijing, a serious charge which threatened to damage her reputation. Hu Die had to purchase space on Shen Bao, Shanghai's biggest newspaper, to dispel the rumour, which she believed was started by the Japanese media in order to discredit Zhang Xueliang. Her account was corroborated by other Mingxing actors and employees. Years later, memoirs of people close to Zhang Xueliang indicated that he had never met Hu Die in his life, and Zhang was ordered by Chiang Kai-shek not to resist the much stronger enemy.

=== Movie Queen ===
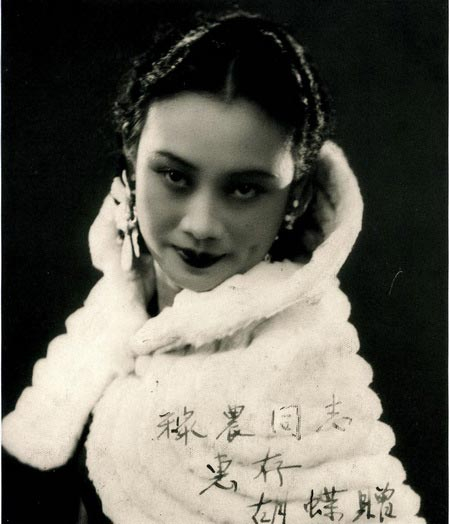
Hu Die's autographed photo for actor Gong Jianong

In 1933, the newspaper Star Daily (明星日报) conducted China's first public poll for the most popular movie stars. Fans across the country, as well as some from Japan, participated in the poll, and the results were unveiled in a public ceremony on 28 February. Hu Die was the runaway winner with 21,334 votes, more than twice as many as the first runner-up Chen Yumei, and almost three times the votes her friend Ruan Lingyu received. She was crowned China's first "Movie Queen".

=== European tour ===
In February 1935, Hu Die was invited to join a Chinese delegation to participate in the Moscow International Film Festival in the Soviet Union. She was the only film star in the delegation, which mainly comprised influential men of the industry. She arrived too late for the festival, but received a warm welcome, and her films Twin Sisters and Orchid in a Remote Valley (Konggu Lan) were shown in Moscow and Leningrad. From Moscow she went on to tour Germany, France, England, Switzerland and Italy, receiving significant public attention and VIP treatment from the Europeans, to whom Chinese film stars were novelties. She took many notes and photographs, and published a travelogue after returning to China.

=== Marriage ===
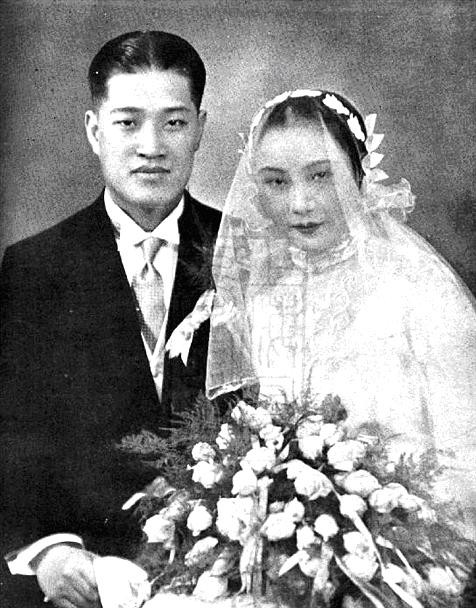
Wedding photo of Hu Die and Pan Yousheng

In 1931, a cousin introduced Hu Die to Pan Yousheng (潘有声), a young employee of a Shanghai trading firm. Hu Die was careful about her personal life and their relationship progressed slowly until autumn 1935, when they announced their impending marriage. Their wedding was the most important social event in Shanghai of that year. Famous film stars served as bridesmaids and groomsmen, and child stars were their flower girls and page boys. Hu Die was ready to retire from the film industry, as was customary at the time after an actress' marriage, but with her husband's support, she signed a contract with Mingxing to make one film per year. She only made one more film under the new contract, before the Second Sino-Japanese War broke out, and the hard-fought Battle of Shanghai completely destroyed Mingxing and other Shanghai studios in 1937.

=== Sino-Japanese War ===
As the Empire of Japan invaded and occupied Shanghai and much of east China, Hu Die and Pan Yousheng fled to British Hong Kong. Hu Die gave birth to a daughter and a boy during this time. Pan worked for a trading firm in Hong Kong, while she also made two films. After the outbreak of the Pacific War in December 1941, Hong Kong also fell to the Japanese. The Japanese pressured her to make a documentary film entitled Hu Die Touring Tokyo for their war propaganda, but Hu Die refused to become a collaborator, and secretly planned her escape to Chongqing, the war-time capital of the Republic of China resistance. It was a long and circuitous journey through the war zone. She entrusted her belongings to the underground, and casually walked out of her Hong Kong home one day. Resistance partisans guided her through the New Territories to Guangdong province. She stayed in Shaoguan for a year and a half before leaving for Guilin in Guangxi, and did not reach Chongqing until the end of 1943.

Soon after arriving in Chongqing, Hu Die starred in the film The Road to Nation Building to aid the war effort. While she was filming on location in Guilin, the Japanese launched the major offensive Operation Ichi-Go. The film crew lost all their equipment, and had to join the tens of thousands of refugees fleeing the war front on foot. The Road to Nation Building was Hu Die's only unfinished film, and she later described the incident as "the most tragic moment of my life".

While in Chongqing, Hu Die became connected with the powerful spy master Dai Li. She had been previously introduced to Dai Li in Shanghai by her colleague Xu Lai, who was married to a close friend of Dai Li's. According to the memoir of Dai Li's lieutenant Shen Zui, Hu Die became Dai Li's mistress during the period.

=== Post-World War II ===
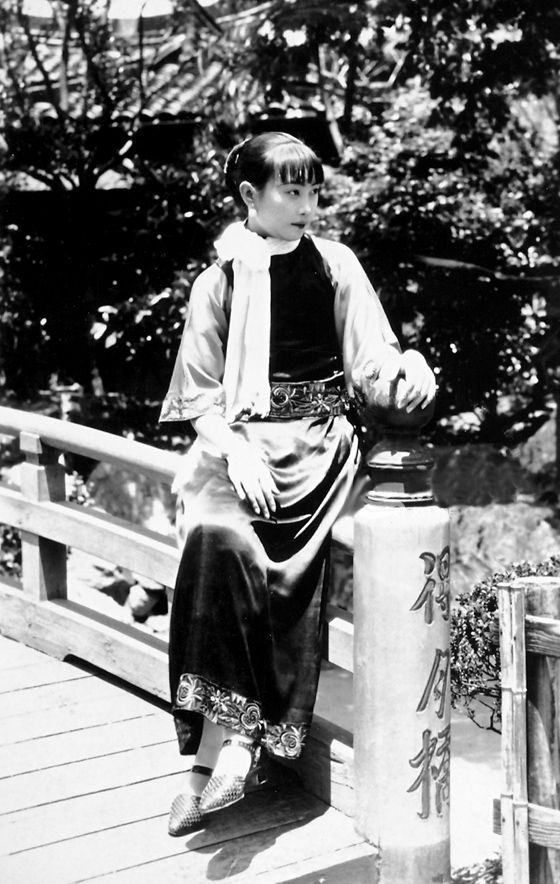
Hu Die, photo by Wang Kai Studio

Hu Die returned to Shanghai after the surrender of Japan in 1945. Dai Li was killed in a plane crash in March 1946. In the midst of the Chinese Civil War, Hu Die again moved with her husband to Hong Kong in 1946. Pan Yousheng started a company making thermoses with the brand Butterfly, and she actively promoted her namesake product in Hong Kong and Southeast Asia. They lived a few happy years together, until Pan died soon after being diagnosed with liver cancer in 1958.

After her husband's death, Hu Die returned to the film industry in 1959, now taking roles as older women, which took her some time to adjust to. She made several films for Shaw Brothers Studio, a successor company of Tianyi, and her performance in Li Han-hsiang's Rear Door (Houmen) won her the Best Actress Award at the Seventh Asian Film Festival held in Tokyo in 1960. It also won the Best Film Award.

Hu Die retired in 1966, after a career spanning more than four decades. It was said that in 1967 she married an admirer named Zhu Fangkun (or Song Kunfang), who had given her financial support in the difficult period following Pan Yousheng's death. She emigrated to Vancouver, British Columbia, Canada in 1975 to join her son. She lived a low-key life and avoided attention by using the name Pan Baojuan. She dictated her memoir in 1986, which first appeared in Taiwan's United Daily News in serials, and was published in Taiwan in 1987. She died on 23 April 1989, after suffering a stroke.

=== Illegitimate daughter ===
Hu Die had an illegitimate daughter named Hu Ruomei (胡若梅), later renamed to Hu Yousong (胡友松), who was born in 1939. The identity of her father is unknown. She was raised by a foster mother and stayed in mainland China while Hu Die moved to Hong Kong. In 1966, Hu Yousong married Li Zongren, who had briefly served as president of the Republic of China, and was 49 years her senior. After Li Zongren died in 1969, she was persecuted during the Cultural Revolution, and later became a Buddhist nun.

== Selected filmography ==
- The Burning of the Red Lotus Temple (1928–1931), a martial arts film
- Sing-Song Girl Red Peony (1931), a sound film
- Twin Sisters (1934)

== Bibliography ==
- Lee, Lily Xiao Hong; Stefanowska, A. D.; Wiles, Sue (2003). Biographical Dictionary of Chinese Women. M.E. Sharpe. ISBN 978-0-7656-0798-0.
- Perkins, Dorothy (2013). Encyclopedia of China: History and Culture. Routledge. ISBN 978-1-135-93562-7.
- Wakeman, Frederic E. (2003). Spymaster: Dai Li and the Chinese Secret Service. University of California Press. ISBN 978-0-520-92876-3.
- Xiao, Zhiwei (2002). Encyclopedia of Chinese Film. Routledge. ISBN 978-1-134-74554-8.
- Ye, Tan; Zhu, Yun (2012). Historical Dictionary of Chinese Cinema. Rowman & Littlefield. ISBN 978-0-8108-6779-6.
