= Shaw House and Centre =

Shaw House
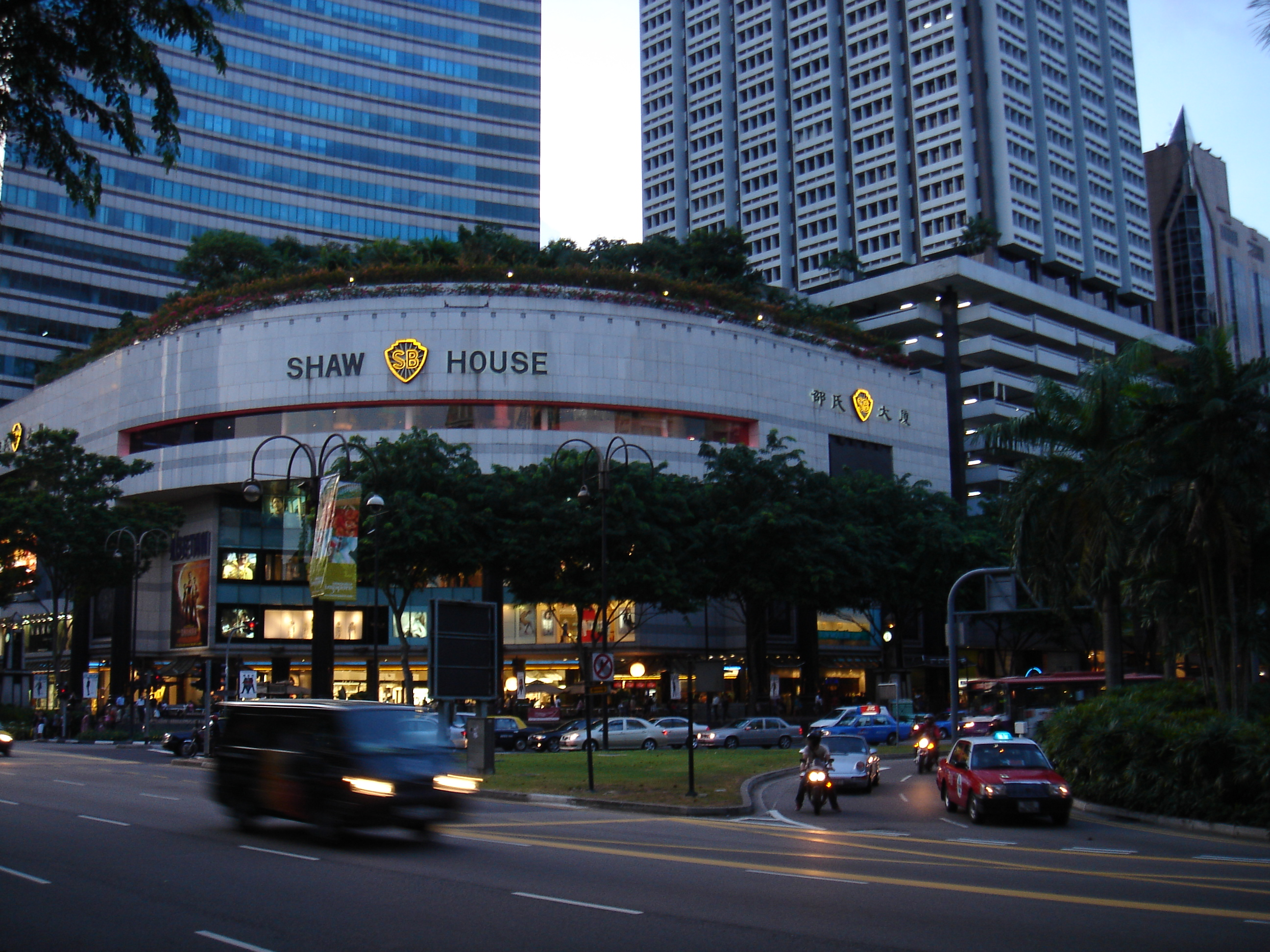
- Shaw House
- Location: Singapore
- Coordinates: 1°18′21″N 103°49′53.5″E
- Address: 350 Orchard Road
- Opened: 1993
- Developer: Shaw Organisation
- Manager: Shaw Organisation
- Owner: Shaw Organisation
- Num. of stores: 12
- Num. of anchor tenants: 2
- Floors: 22
- Public transit: NS22 TE14 Orchard
- Website: shaw.com.sg

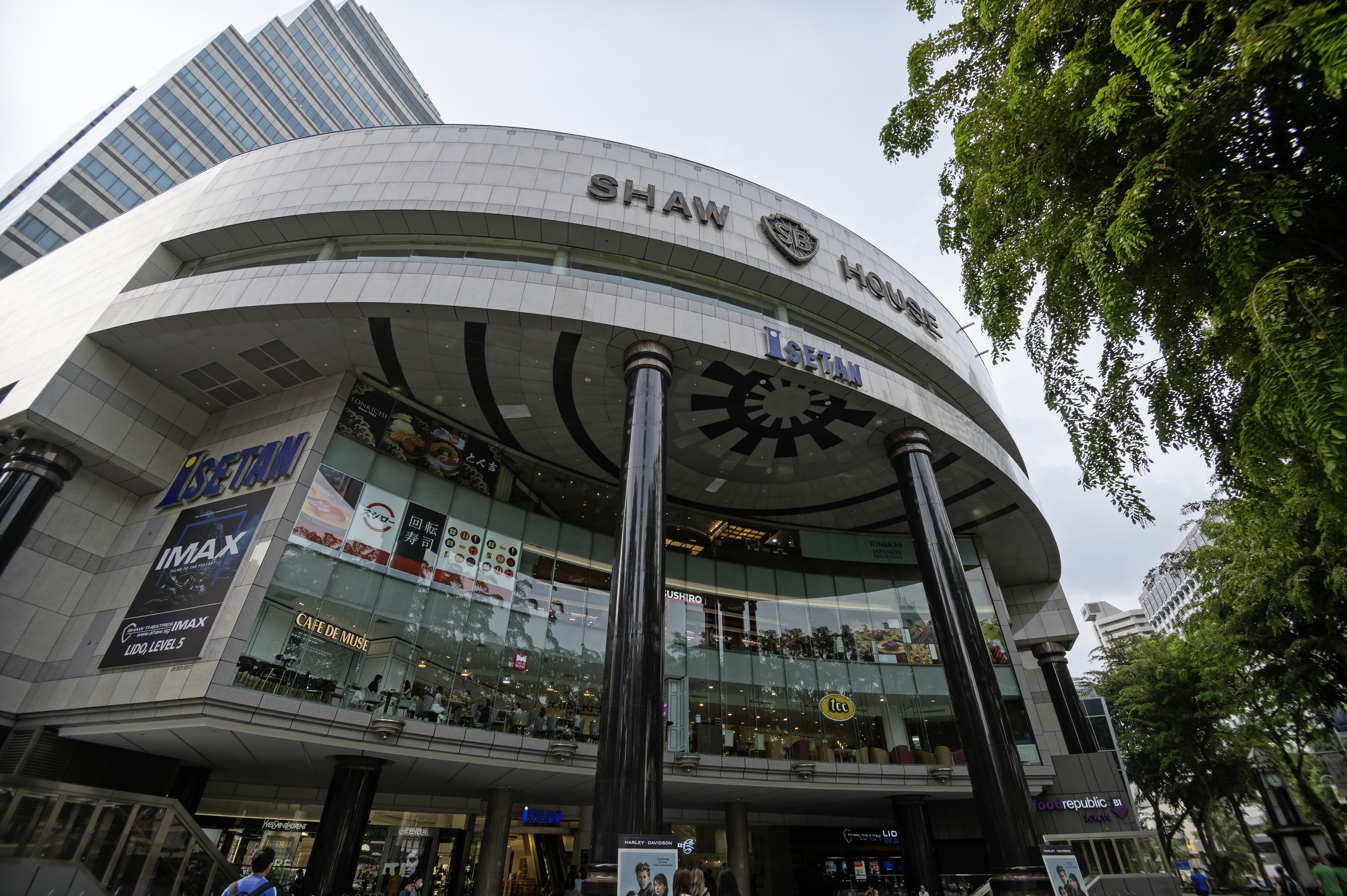
Shaw House in June 2024.

Shaw House and Shaw Centre is a complex of two neighbouring buildings built by the same developer, Shaw Organisation. Located at the junction of Orchard Road and Scotts Road in Singapore, it features the flagship Lido Cineplex for the Shaw Organisation, a major shopping mall with Isetan as an anchor tenant, and two office buildings.

== Shaw House ==
Shaw House is a shopping mall and the home of Lido Cinema (now Lido 8 Cineplex). Lido Cinema was constructed in 1958 as a 10-storey office block, and was officially opened by Lim Yew Hock on 22 November 1958.

In the late 1980s, owner Shaw Organisation decided to tear down the old Lido Cinema, and build a 21-storey building with a basement. This project, which was the Shaw Organisation's largest in Singapore to date, was completed in 1993 after three years of construction. Shaw House houses the main store of Isetan in Singapore, and occupies five floors. It has a Japanese supermarket in the basement, and has offices on the upper floors of the building.

In mid-2010, plans were made to add two more 3D theatres and one IMAX theatre. The Cineplex closed in late 2010 for renovations to add the new theatres. It reopened on 5 May 2011. The IMAX theatre officially opened on 19 May 2011 to screen its first film, Pirates of the Caribbean: On Stranger Tides.

== Shaw Centre ==
Shaw Centre
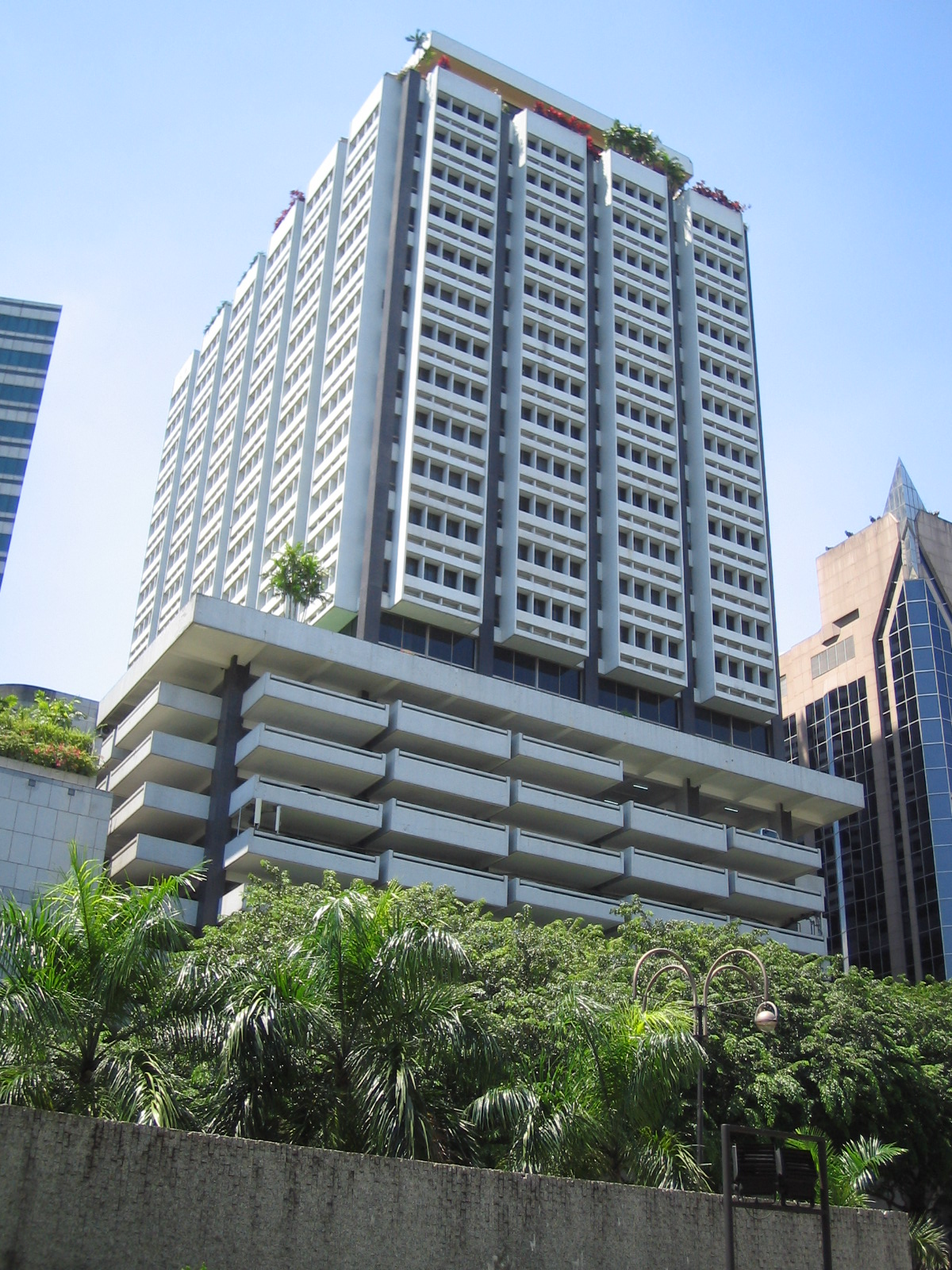
- Shaw Centre
- Location: Orchard, Singapore
- Address: 1 Scotts Road
- Opened: 1972
- Developer: Shaw Organisation
- Manager: Shaw Organisation
- Floors: 28 (B, 1-27)
- Public transit: NS22 TE14 Orchard

Shaw Centre lies adjacent to Shaw House, and was the tallest building in Singapore when it was completed in 1972. The head office of Shaw & Shaw Pte Limited, the precursor of Shaw Organisation, moved into Shaw Centre in 1978.

The old Lido Cinema and Shaw Centre were designed by architect, Gordon Dowsett of Van Sitteren & Partners.

The high commission of Pakistan is situated on the 24th floor of the building.

== See also ==
- Runme Shaw, founder of Shaw Organisation.
- Run Run Shaw, co-founder of Shaw Organisation.
