= Sing-Song Girl Red Peony =

1931 Chinese film by Zhang Shichuan

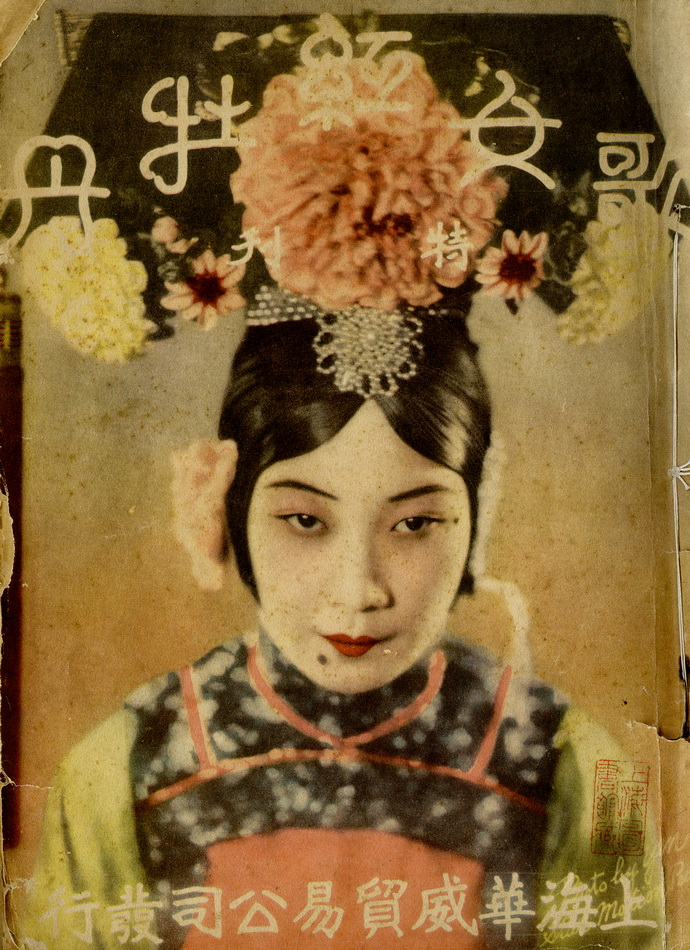
- Promotional booklet
- Traditional Chinese: 歌女紅牡丹
- Simplified Chinese: 歌女红牡丹
Transcriptions
Standard Mandarin
- Hanyu Pinyin: Gēnǚ gōng mǔdān
- Directed by: Zhang Shichuan
- Screenplay by: Hong Shen
- Starring: Hu Die; Wang Xianzhai; Xia Peizhen
- Cinematography: Dong Keyi
- Production company: Mingxing Film Company
- Release date: 15 March 1931 (China)
- Running time: 9 reels
- Country: China
- Language: Mandarin

Sing-Song Girl Red Peony (simplified Chinese: 歌女红牡丹; traditional Chinese: 歌女紅牡丹; pinyin: Gēnǚ gōng mǔdān) is a 1931 film directed by Zhang Shichuan for the Mingxing Film Company. It follows the actress Red Peony, played by Hu Die, who is trapped in an abusive marriage but feels obligated to persevere. The first sound film made in the Republic of China, production took six months and involved an expansive crew, including language coaches, to surmount the technical difficulties. The film, now thought lost, was well received by audiences.

== Plot ==
The prominent actress Red Peony lives with her abusive husband, supporting his expensive habits through her career. Forced by customary mores to remain in this unhappy relationship, she grows depressed and damages her voice. As her career suffers, her husband continues his spending habits, leading him to sell their daughter to a brothel when he runs out of money. Her freedom is purchased by one of Red Peony's suitors. The husband is soon arrested for involuntary manslaughter. Despite their history, Red Peony forgives him and campaigns for an early release. The husband, touched, begins to strive to become a better man.

== Production ==
Sing-Song Girl Red Peony was directed by Zhang Shichuan for the Mingxing Film Company, with Cheng Bugao acting as assistant director. It was based on a screenplay by Hong Shen. Cinematography was handled by Dong Keyi. Production, which took place over six months, cost 120,000 yuan (equivalent to ¥10,720,000 in 2019); this was six times the cost of an ordinary Mingxing production. More than a hundred crew members were involved.

The cast of Sing-Song Girl Red Peony included Hu Die, Xia Peizhen, Wang Xianzhai, Gong Jianong, Wang Jiting, Tang Jie, Tan Zhiyuan, and Xiao Ying. Hu, who had been one of Mingxing's bankable stars since joining the company in 1928, took the starring role of Red Peony. Having only had experience with silent films, she experienced significant challenges making a sound film. Hu's vocals were later overdubbed by Mei Lanfang, a male Peking opera singer who had risen to prominence playing female roles.

For Sing-Song Girl Red Peony, Mingxing sought to use sound technology, which had gained popularity through imported works. Local productions such as Wild Flower had attempted to use sound to some extent. However, these were only partial sound films, and many contemporary Chinese cinemas lacked the technology to properly screen films with integrated sound. Unable to afford imported equipment from the United States, Mingxing adopted sound-on-disc technology. The film included four songs from Peking opera: "Mu Ke Zhai", "Yu Tang Chun", "Silang Visits His Mother", and "Na Gao Deng"; the genre was popular among contemporary cinema-goers.

This use of sound technology created stress for the cast and crew. Rather than rely solely on an outline, a detailed script was required. Many of the performers were required to practice the Mandarin language, which had been mandated for national distribution, and language coaches were brought in to help them achieve the correct accent. The film was shot first, with the cast and crew later dubbing their lines at the Shanghai studios of Pathé. Zhang recalled that the first four attempts ended in failure, due to technical problems and pacing issues. Ultimately, he began to use opium to alleviate the stress of production.

== Release and reception ==
Making its debut at the Strand Theatre on 15 March 1931, the nine-reel Sing-Song Girl Red Peony was well-received by audiences. The film was later distributed to the Dutch East Indies and the Philippines, with prints sold for 16,000 to 18,000 yuan (¥1,430,000 to ¥1,610,000 in 2019). Writing in the Encyclopaedia of China, Huang Jiaming describes Sing-Song Girl Red Peony as highlighting the damage caused by feudal ethics.

Sing-Song Girl Red Peony has been considered the first sound film to have been produced in the Republic of China. However, as its dialogue and songs were recorded to a phonograph cylinder, which was played together with the film during showings, the Tianyi Film Company's Spring on Stage (1931) – which used sound-on-film technology – has also been given this label. In subsequent years, silent and sound films continued to be produced simultaneously. Mingxing would only release its final silent film, Season of Falling Flowers, in 1935.

== Works cited ==
- Huang Jiaming (黄加明) (20 January 2022). 歌女红牡丹 [Sing-Song Girl Red Peony]. Encyclopaedia of China (in Chinese).
- Huang, Xuelei (2014). Shanghai Filmmaking: Crossing Borders, Connecting to the Globe, 1922–1938. Leiden: Brill. ISBN 978-90-04-27933-9.
- Luo, Dan; Ye, Tan; Zhu, Yun (2024). Historical Dictionary of Chinese Cinema. Lanham, Maryland: Rowman & Littlefield. ISBN 978-1-5381-5730-5.
- "Mei Lanfang". Encyclopaedia Britannica. 18 October 2024. Archived from the original on 25 September 2024.
- Xiao, Zhiwei (1998). "Chinese Cinema". In Zhang, Yingjin; Xiao, Zhiwei (eds.). Encyclopedia of Chinese Film. New York, London: Routledge. pp. 3–30. ISBN 978-0-415-15168-9.
- Xiao, Zhiwei (1998). "Sing-Song Girl Red Peony". In Zhang, Yingjin; Xiao, Zhiwei (eds.). Encyclopedia of Chinese Film. New York, London: Routledge. pp. 305–306. ISBN 978-0-415-15168-9.
- Xu, Gary (2012). "Chinese Cinema and Technology". In Zhang, Yingjin (ed.). A Companion to Chinese Cinema. Hoboken, New Jersey: Wiley. pp. 449–465. doi:10.1002/9781444355994. ISBN 978-1-4443-5599-4.
- Yeh, Yueh-Yu (2002). "Historiography and Sinification: Music in Chinese Cinema of the 1930s". Cinema Journal. 41 (3): 78–97. doi:10.1353/cj.2002.0012. JSTOR 1225700.
- Zhang, Yingjin (2004). Chinese National Cinema. London: Psychology Press. ISBN 978-0-415-17289-9.
- Zhang Yue (张岳) (2014). 于无声处听惊雷 ——浅析中国早期有声电影的试制 [Hearing Thunder in Silence: A Brief Analysis of the Trial Production of Early Chinese Sound Films] (PDF). Media Research (in Chinese). 12 (1): 1–13. Archived from the original (PDF) on 28 November 2024.
- Zhu, Ying (2022). Hollywood in China: Behind the Scenes of the World's Largest Movie Market. New York: The New Press. ISBN 978-1-62097-219-9.
