= Chen Yumei =

Chinese actress and singer

- 陳玉梅
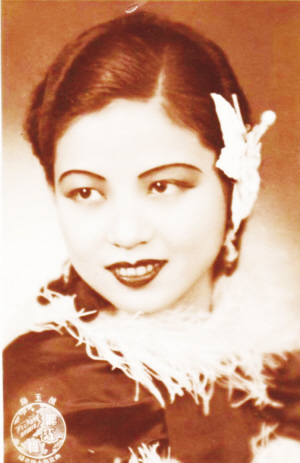
- Born: Fei Mengmin (simplified Chinese: 费梦敏; traditional Chinese: 費夢敏; pinyin: Fèi Mèngmǐn); 1910; Menghe, Changzhou, Jiangsu, Qing dynasty
- Died: 1985 (aged 75)
- Occupation(s): Actress, singer
- Notable work: The Flirting Scholar (1926); A Girl Named Yunlan (1932); Livelihood (1933)
- Spouse: Runje Shaw (m. 1934; died 1975)
- Children: 6

Chen Yumei
- Traditional Chinese: 陳玉梅
- Simplified Chinese: 陈玉梅
Transcriptions
Standard Mandarin
- Hanyu Pinyin: Chén Yùméi

Chen Yumei (Chinese: 陳玉梅; born Fei Mengmin (Chinese: 費夢敏); 1910–1985) was a Chinese film actress and singer active during the 1920s and 1930s. In her heyday she was one of the biggest stars in China, crowned "Movie Queen" in 1934. At the peak of her career she married Runje Shaw (Shao Zuiweng), the boss of Tianyi Film Company, and retired from acting. She was nicknamed the "frugal star" for her efforts at promoting the virtue of frugality.

== Career ==
Chen Yumei was born in the town of Menghe (孟河) in Changzhou, Jiangsu province in 1910. Her name at birth was Fei Mengmin (费梦敏).

Chen made her film debut at age 13, playing a minor role in the film Song Bai Yuan (松柏缘) made by the film division of the Commercial Press in Shanghai. At age 15 she enrolled at the actress training school of the Laughter Stage, a theatre run by Runje Shaw (Shao Zuiweng), her future husband. In 1926 she joined Tianyi, the film studio recently founded by Shaw, and was selected by Shaw to play the starring role of Qiu Xiang in the film The Flirting Scholar (唐伯虎点秋香). The film was not a great success, and Chen remained a secondary star of Tianyi after Hu Die (Butterfly Wu) and Wu Suxin (吴素馨).

In 1928 Tianyi's star actress Hu Die defected to the Mingxing Film Company, Tianyi's main rival, and Chen Yumei replaced her as Tianyi's number one actress. She starred in more than 30 movies made by Tianyi, most notably A Girl Named Yunlan (芸兰姑娘, 1932), Livelihood (生机, 1933), and The Struggle (挣扎, 1933). Many of her roles were of a tragic nature. During an interview, she named Livelihood, a progressive movie banned by the Shanghai Municipal Council, as one of her favourite films. She sang many of the theme songs in her movies, several of which topped the charts, and she released a record by Pathé Records.

Chen Yumei was known for extolling the virtue of frugality and was nicknamed the "frugal star". She frequently appeared in public wearing a cheongsam made of plain cloth, and was once seen smoking a very cheap brand of cigarettes at a high-profile party.

== Awards ==
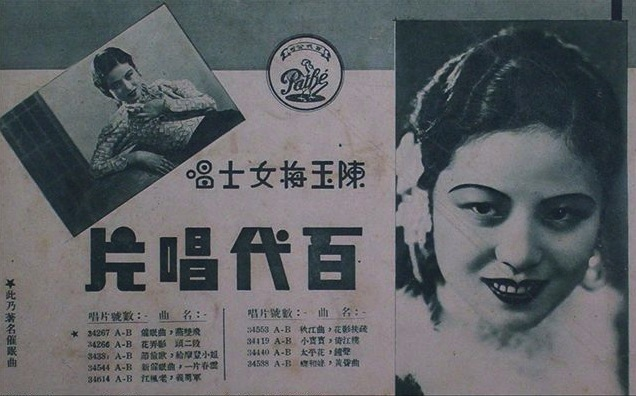
Chen Yumei's music record, released by Pathé Records

In 1933, Chen Dieyi (陈蝶衣), publisher of the newspaper Star Daily (明星日报), organized China's first public poll for the most popular movie stars. Fans across the country, as well as some from Japan, participated in the poll, and the results were unveiled in a public ceremony on 28 February. Chen Yumei's former colleague Hu Die was the runaway winner, and was crowned the "Movie Queen" with 21,334 votes. Chen Yumei was the first runner-up with 10,028 votes, ahead of Lianhua's star Ruan Lingyu, who was the second runner-up with 7,290 votes.

In 1934, the newspaper Movie Life organized the second poll for the "Movie Queen", and Chen Yumei won the title with 30,232 votes. However, it was alleged that Tianyi's boss Runje Shaw bought numerous copies of the newspaper and cast multiple votes to help her win.

== Marriage and retirement ==
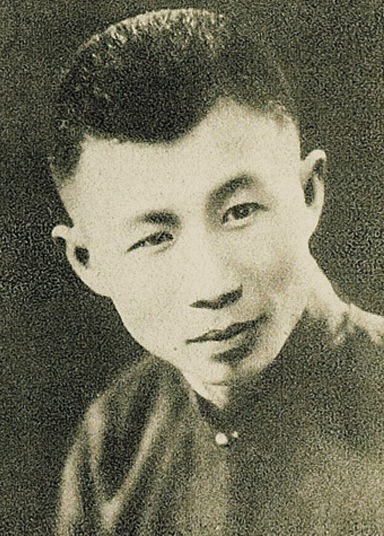
Chen's husband Runje Shaw

Soon after she won the "Movie Queen" title, Chen Yumei married her boss Runje Shaw in 1934 and retired from acting. In the same year Tianyi expanded to Hong Kong and built a studio in Kowloon. Shaw went to Hong Kong to supervise the company's operations, and Chen accompanied him there. After the Second Sino-Japanese War destroyed Tianyi's business in Shanghai and the subsequent Communist victory in China, Shaw retired from film-making and later died in Shanghai in 1975. Chen kept a low profile and reportedly died in 1985.
