= Runme Shaw =

Hong Kong businessman

Yang Berbahagia Tan Sri Dato' Runme Shaw PMN DIMP
- 邵仁枚
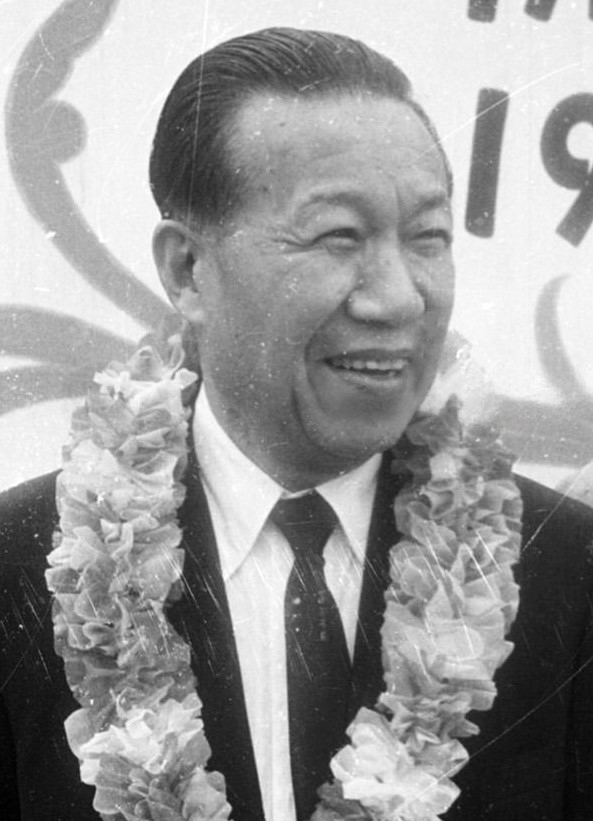
- Shaw in 1964
- Born: 1 January 1901; Zhenhai County, Zhejiang Province, Qing Empire
- Died: 2 March 1985 (aged 84); Singapore
- Occupation: businessman
- Years active: 1925–1983
- Title: Shaw Organisation (founder and former chairman)
- Spouse: Peggy Shaw
- Children: 6
- Relatives: Run Run Shaw (brother); Runje Shaw (brother); Runde Shaw (brother)
- Awards: Panglima Mangku Negara (1965); Meritorious Service Medal (from the Singapore Government); Doctor of Letters (from the National University of Singapore)

Runme Shaw, K.St.J (Chinese: 邵仁枚; pinyin: Shào Rénméi; 1 January 1901 – 2 March 1985) was the chairman and founder of the Shaw Organisation of Singapore. Runme Shaw and his brother, Run Run Shaw, together known as the Shaw Brothers, were pioneers in the film and entertainment industry in Singapore and Malaya, and brought to life the movie industry in Asia, especially the Southeast Asian region.

Runme Shaw was also a philanthropist who started the Shaw Foundation, a charitable organisation. In addition, Runme was the chairman and president of several government boards, and a patron of many organisations. As a result, Runme won many local and foreign awards for his philanthropic work and contribution to the movie industry in Southeast Asia.

== Early life and education ==
Runme Shaw was the third of six sons of Ningbo city textile merchant, Shaw Yuh Hsuen (1866–1921). A native of Zhenhai in China, Shaw Yuh Hsuen married Wang Shun Xiang (1871–1939), and had a total of 10 children, three of whom died at an early age. He had his own import-export company, and was also the owner of an opera hall in which Runme Shaw's brother, Runje Shaw, was its principal playwright and director. However, the opera business failed.

Runme was educated in traditional Shanghainese schools, learning Confucian classics and classical Chinese literature.

== Business in Shanghai ==
With the Chinese movie industry still in its infancy in the early 20th century, Runje Shaw saw the potential in producing and distributing films in China. In 1925 he established Tianyi Film Company (also known as Unique) in Shanghai, and started off with producing silent movies. Run Run and Runme (who was then working as a sales manager in his father's trading company) soon joined Runje in the venture.

Not satisfied with their domestic market, the Shaw brothers wanted to seek business opportunities elsewhere. Runme, who was the distribution manager, was given this task. Originally, Runme's destination was Indochina where he hoped to meet with the film distributors, but he was denied permission to land there. When the Shaw brothers saw great distribution potential in the Southeast Asian market where many Chinese immigrants lived, Runme chose Singapore as his base.

== Establishment of Shaw Organisation ==
=== The Empire ===
Runme Shaw arrived in Singapore in 1925 to test the market for the Shaw brothers' films. He was later joined by Run Run and they together founded the Hai Seng Co (later Shaw Brothers Pte Ltd, the precursor of Shaw Organisation) in Singapore in 1927.

However, for new arrivals like Runme, finding distributors and exhibitors for their brand of silent movies proved a hurdle. As Shanghainese, Runme and Run Run found themselves locked out of the highly protected market by the dominant dialect factions – Cantonese, Hokkien and Teochew – who controlled the local film business. The film distributors believed that these businessmen imported films from China directly and showed them in their cinemas, and so very few wanted to release the Shaw's silent films. There was also an alliance between a major exhibition circuit run by Malayan cinema king Wang Yu Ting and Shanghai's Liuhe Film Company, a cartel that boycotted Shaw films.

Undaunted by the opposition and prejudice, Runme and Run Run persevered to carve out a market share for themselves. By 1927, they began operating their own cinema in Tanjong Pagar so as to show their films. The makeshift timber cinema, known as The Empire, was leased to the Shaw brothers at a monthly rent of S$2,000, a large amount by today's value.

The first film shown at The Empire was a Chinese theatre play, called "Romance of the Opera", produced by Runme's own company. White cloth hung from the ceiling served as the projection screen for the cinema, where the audience sat on hard wooden benches and chairs. During screening, musicians, usually pianists, were hired to accompany the action, and this was meant more to mask the noise from projectors and the audience than to provide the sound effect. Only two evening shows were screened per day. Despite this, the theatre attracted crowds with its offering of Chinese movies.

=== Expansion into Malaya ===
As profits grew, Runme ventured into Malaya in the 1920s and 1930s, with Run Run taking charge of business in Singapore. He travelled to small towns and major cities, including Kuala Lumpur, Penang, and Ipoh, to distribute and show his films. Ipoh was chosen as his base in Malaya, from where smaller towns could be explored for business potential.

Many of the small towns in Malaya did not have cinemas. One of the ways the Shaw brothers would test the market was to set their own temporary cinemas in open fields. Another means was to retrofit local Malay opera houses into cinemas, by entering into joint ventures with the local owners. Wherever their films proved very popular, the Shaw brothers would build a permanent theatre. In more rural areas, mobile cinemas were operated.

In setting up cinemas throughout Malaya, the Shaw brothers usually bought more land than was needed around the theatres. These were Runme's first real estate ventures, as he reasoned correctly that a successful cinema would benefit surrounding businesses thereby raising land value. With the growing chain of cinemas in Malaya, the Shaw brothers split their duties, with Runme eventually taking charge of northern Malaya while Run Run the southern half, which included Singapore.

=== Expansion in the pre-war years ===
Although the Great Depression of the late 1920s affected their business, it recovered sufficiently for the Shaw brothers to buy over more cinemas. By 1939, the Shaws operated a chain of 139 cinemas across Singapore, Malaysia, Thailand, Indonesia and Indochina. All the cinemas were managed under Malayan Theatres Limited, a subsidiary of Shaw Brothers Limited. In Singapore, the Shaw brothers expanded The Empire and moved to a brick building, the Alhambra, on Beach Road. The Alhambra was the first Singapore cinema to have air conditioning and played films like Errol Flynn's The Adventures of Robin Hood.

The Shaw brothers not only made their own movies, but also imported foreign ones which Runme brought in the early 1930s. Runme attributed the success of the Shaw brothers' film business to hard work and consumer foresight, knowing intuitively the public's taste in films and what appealed to them.

Besides the film industry, the Shaw brothers also expanded into the business of amusement parks, first in Singapore, then in Malaya. These were modelled after the ones in Shanghai where they were popular with the locals. They acquired and operated two of the three amusement parks in Singapore – New World Amusement Park at Jalan Besar and Great World Amusement Park at River Valley – from the mid-1930s to the 1980s. The Shaw brothers also started amusement parks in major cities in Malaya like Kuala Lumpur and Ipoh.

=== Japanese Occupation ===
In 1942, the beginning of the Japanese Occupation of Singapore put an immediate stop to all the Shaw brothers' cinema and amusement park shows. Runme and Run Run had planned to leave for Australia with their families, but their plans were dashed when a quota based on age was enforced on young men leaving the country which Run Run did not qualify. Leaving their respective homes, the families of Runme and Run Run moved into the newly built Shaw villa at Queen Astrid Park in December 1941.

With the surrender of the British forces to the Japanese in 1942, the Shaw brothers and their families fled from their home at Queen Astrid. The Imperial Japanese Army wanted Runme to produce and distribute propaganda films. Despite his attempts to hide, Runme was eventually captured by the Japanese. All Shaw cinemas were immediately seized by the Japanese propaganda body known as the Bunka Eiga Gekijio and the Shaw brothers interrogated. Runme was paid $350 each month to run the films during World War II, and he continued to supervise the operation of theatres in Singapore and Malaysia. The Shaw brothers were also allowed to reopen their amusement parks to the public.

After the Japanese occupation, the Shaw brothers returned to their movie business. With the impending invasion of Singapore, the Shaw brothers converted their assets into gold, jewellery and cash, and buried them in their back garden. After the war, Runme dug these up, and rebuilt his theatres and restarted his movie business.

=== Post-war years ===
The movie industry thrived after the end of World War II, and Runme saw his company's profits multiply. By 1965, the Shaw brothers owned 19 cinema halls in Singapore. There were also 30 independent halls in Singapore contracted to play only Shaw's distributed films. The Shaw brothers had the widest cinema network in Singapore. They also expanded rapidly into the region, and had a chain of more than 150 cinemas and 6 amusement parks in both Malaya and Singapore.

From the mid-1960s to the early 1980s, Runme became famous for bringing kung-fu films to cinemas in Singapore. By 1988, the company was reorganised under the umbrella of The Shaw Organisation Pte Ltd. Besides movies, the Shaw brothers had also diversified into various commercial and residential property developments, and have more than 15 subsidiaries operating office blocks, apartment buildings, shopping arcades, hotels, amusement centres and multiplexes.

== Other appointments ==
Runme Shaw also served on the boards of several government bodies and corporations, besides his own Shaw Organisation group of companies.

On 1 March 1969, Runme was appointed as chairman of the Singapore Tourist Promotion Board, succeeding P. H. Meadows. During his tenure, Runme revamped the running of the board, added more staff and capital input, and opened tourist offices abroad in countries such as Australia, Japan, the United Kingdom and United States. Runme held the position till 1976.

His success in turning the Board around prompted an offer for Runme to run as chairman for the Singapore Turf Club which he accepted. He was also a director at the Oversea-Chinese Banking Corporation, Fraser and Neave, presidents of St. John Ambulance Brigade and Alliance Francaise, and served at the Bank of Singapore, Bukit Timah Saddle Club, National St. John Council and the Shangri-La Hotel Singapore.

Runme was a patron of the National Kidney Foundation, Metropolitan YMCA, Singapore Association for Mental Health, Singapore National Heart Association, St. John's Council, Society for Aid to the Paralysed, Diabetic Society of Singapore and the Singapore Academy of Medicine.

== Philanthropy ==
Runme Shaw set up the philanthropic Shaw Foundation in 1958. The foundation's main purpose was to "return" his company's profits to society.

The Shaw Foundation donated millions of dollars to many charitable organisations and causes. Many of the beneficiaries were schools, such as Maris Stella High School, Anglo-Chinese School and St. Patrick's School, where a part of its buildings are now named after the Shaw Foundation. As the chairman of the Singapore Turf Club for 19 years, Runme instituted the club's charitable use of funds for medical research and charitable purposes.

He was also involved in the St. John Ambulance.

== Personal life ==
Runme Shaw was married to Peggy Soo Wei Ping, and had two sons and four daughters.

== Honours ==
For his contributions to the society, Runme Shaw received numerous awards including the Panglima Mangku Negara by the Yang di-Pertuan Agong of Malaysia in 1965. This award gave him the title Tan Sri, an honorific which is the second most senior in the system of Malay titles. Among his many honours, Runme Shaw also received a Meritorious Service Medal from the Singapore Government and a Doctor of Letters awarded by the National University of Singapore.

- Malaysia :
  - Commanders of the Order of the Defender of the Realm (PMN) – Tan Sri (1965)
- Pahang :
  - Dato Kurnia Perkasa (1966)
  - Knight Companion of the Order of the Crown of Pahang (DIMP) – Dato' (1968)

== Death ==
On 1 September 1982, in Singapore, Runme Shaw fell accidentally. Although he was able to walk home, he soon thereafter collapsed and went into a coma for two and a half years. On 2 March 1985, Runme Shaw died at the age of 84.

== In popular culture ==
Portrayed by Reuben Kang in P. Ramlee The Musical.

== See also ==
- Runde Shaw, second of Runme Shaw's brothers
- Cinema of Hong Kong
- Shaw Brothers Studio
- Shaw House and Centre
