= Runde Shaw =

Hong Kong businessman

- Chinese: 邵仁棣
Transcriptions
Standard Mandarin
- Hanyu Pinyin: Shào Réndì

Shao Cunren
- Chinese: 邵邨人
Transcriptions
Standard Mandarin
- Hanyu Pinyin: Shào Cūnrén

Runde Shaw (1898–1973), also known as Shao Cunren and Shao Rendi, was the second-oldest of the Shaw brothers, originally from Ningbo, Zhejiang, China, who established Tianyi Film Company (also called Unique) in Shanghai in the early 1920s, setting the stage for what would become the most prolific film production company in Asia. His father was Shanghai textile merchant Shaw Yuh Hsuen (1867–1920).

The eldest Shaw brother Runje sent two of his younger brothers, Runme and Run Run to Malaya in 1925 to establish a South East Asian film distribution and cinema exhibition network for Unique's films. Under the direction of Runme, this Singapore-based operation would eventually grow to become known as the modern-day Shaw Organisation.

In 1937, Runde travelled to Hong Kong to establish operations there. Unique would be renamed Nanyang, later to become Shaw and Sons, with Runde replacing Runje as the Shaw Studios boss in Hong Kong. After many successful years of film production, Runde's younger brother Run Run took over as head of the studio, and by 1958 Runde began to focus his company, Shaw and Sons, more on property investment, cinema exhibition and film distribution. Run Run would go on to establish Shaw Brothers Studio and take control over Television Broadcasts Ltd., Hong Kong's dominant terrestrial television broadcaster, building an unrivaled position in the Chinese media industry.

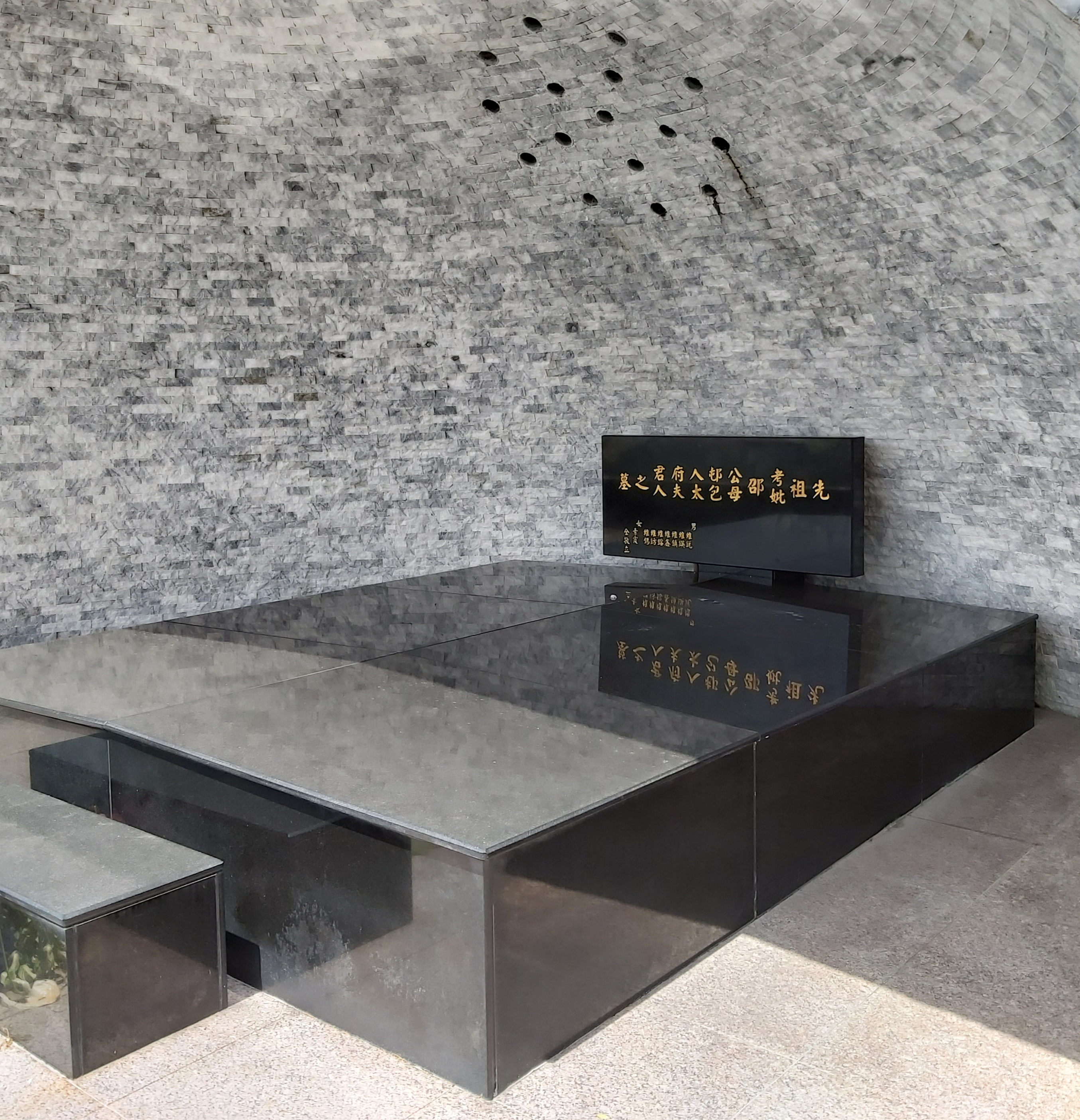
Grave of Runde Shaw in Yangmingshan Cemetery, Taipei.

Runde was married to Pao Lien Fung (包蓮鳳). He died in 1973 in Hong Kong and his company Shaw and Sons is now mainly engaged in property and investment management. Runde had one daughter and seven sons.

== See also ==
- Cinema of Hong Kong
- Cinema of China
