= Shaw Brothers Studio =

Film production company in Hong Kong

Shaw Brothers Holdings Limited
- The Shaw Brothers logo, modeled after the Warner Bros. logo
- Native name: 邵氏兄弟控股有限公司
- Formerly: Shaw Brothers (HK) Ltd. (1958–2011)
- Type: Public company
- Traded as: SEHK: 953
- Industry: Film production Television production
- Founded: 27 December 1958; 67 years ago
- Defunct: 28 November 2011; 14 years ago
- Fate: Merged with Shaw Brothers to form a new Clear Water Bay Land Company Limited
- Successor: Clear Water Bay Land Company Limited
- Headquarters: Hong Kong (main; English-speaking); Macau (main; Portuguese-speaking)
- Area served: Worldwide
- Products: Films; Television shows
- Subsidiaries: Shaw Brothers International Pictures
- Website: shawbrotherspictures.com

Shaw Brothers Studio
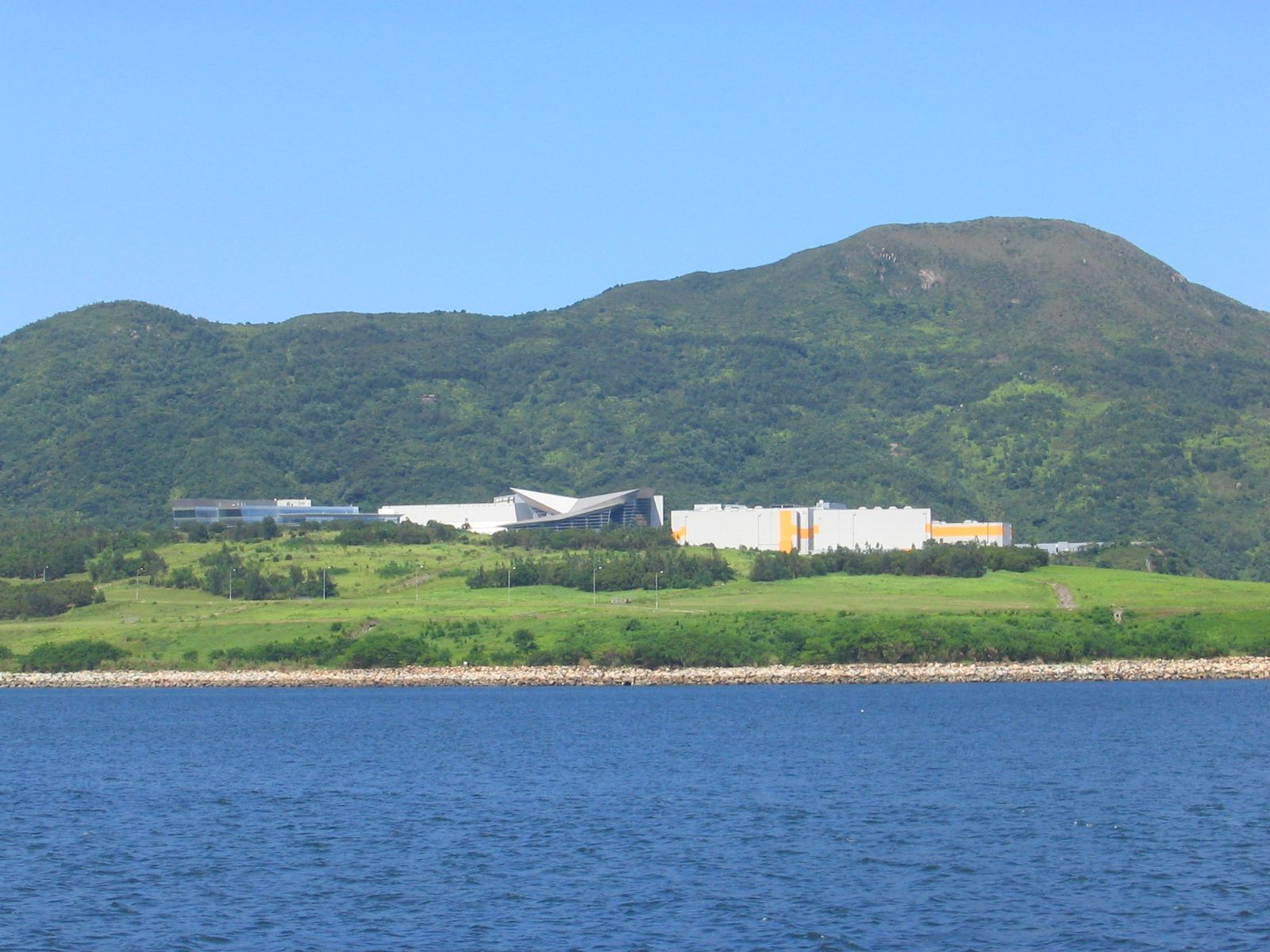
- Shaw Studios, Tseung Kwan O, Hong Kong
- Chinese: 邵氏片場
Transcriptions
Standard Mandarin
- Hanyu Pinyin: Shào Shì Piànchǎng
- Wade–Giles: Shao Shih P'iench'ang
- Yale Romanization: Shàu Shr̀ Pyànchǎng
- IPA: [ʂâʊ ʂɻ̩̂ pʰjɛ̂nʈʂʰàŋ]
Yue: Cantonese
- Yale Romanization: Siuh Sih pin chèuhng
- Jyutping: Siu6 si6 pin3 coeng4
- IPA: [ɕìːu ɕìː pʰɪ̄n tsʰœ̏ŋ]

Shaw Brothers (HK) Limited (Chinese: 邵氏兄弟(香港)公司) was the largest film production company in Hong Kong, operating from 1958 to 2011.

In 1925, three Shaw brothers—Runje, Runme, and Runde—founded Tianyi Film Company (also called "Unique") in Shanghai, and established a film distribution base in Singapore, where Runme and their youngest brother, Run Run Shaw, managed the precursor to the parent company, Shaw Organisation. Runme and Run Run took over the film production business of its Hong Kong–based sister company, Shaw & Sons Ltd; in 1958, a new company, "Shaw Brothers," was set up. In the 1960s, Shaw Brothers established what was once the largest privately owned studio in the world, Movietown.

The company's most famous works include The Love Eterne (1963), Come Drink with Me (1966), The One-Armed Swordsman (1967), King Boxer (1972), Executioners from Shaolin (1977), The 36th Chamber of Shaolin and Five Deadly Venoms (both 1978).

Over the years, the film company produced around 1,000 films, some becoming the most popular and significant Chinese-language films of the period. It also popularized the kung fu genre of films. In 1987, the company suspended film production in order to concentrate on the television industry through its subsidiary, TVB. Film production resumed in limited capacity in 2009.

In 2011, Shaw Brothers was reorganized into the Clear Water Bay Land Company Limited; its film production business was taken over by other companies within the Shaw conglomerate. However, the company continues to remain active in producing TV shows under the Shaw Brothers name to this day as of 2022.

== History ==
For list of films, please see List of Shaw Brothers films.

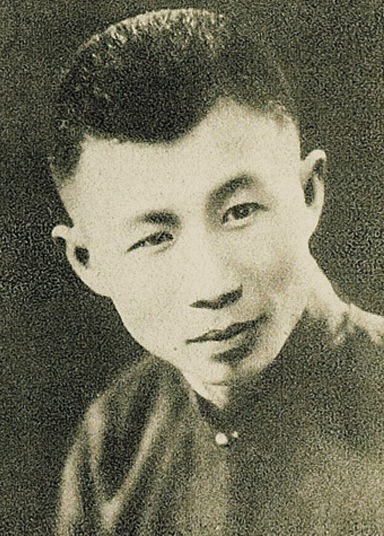
Runje Shaw, the eldest Shaw brother who started the film empire

Prior to their involvement in the filmmaking business, the Shaw brothers were interested in opera and owned a theater in Shanghai; their father also owned a cinema. One of the plays in their theater, The Man from Shensi, was very popular. The Shaw brothers then bought their first camera, and Runje Shaw made this play into a silent film that turned out to be a success. Runje Shaw and his brothers Runde and Runme formed a film production company in 1925 in Shanghai called the Tianyi Film Company (also known as Unique). The company's earliest films, New Leaf (立地成佛) and Heroine Li Feifei (女侠李飛飛), were shown in Shanghai in 1925.

A rival studio, Mingxing Film Company, formed a syndicate with five other Shanghai companies to monopolize the distribution and exhibition markets in order to exclude Tianyi films from being shown in theater chains in Shanghai and Southeast Asia. The brothers therefore became interested in forming their own network, and Runme Shaw, who was then the distribution manager, traveled to Singapore to establish a movie distribution business for Southeast Asia. Runme incorporated the Hai Seng Co. (海星, which later became the Shaw Brothers Pte Ltd) to distribute films made by Tianyi and other studios. In 1927, they operated their own cinema in Tanjong Pagar in Singapore, expanded in Malaya, and opened four cinemas there. The number of cinemas owned by the Shaw chain in Southeast Asia would eventually reach 200 by the 1970s before it declined. In 1928, Run Run Shaw moved to Singapore to assist Runme.

In 1931, the Tianyi Studio in Shanghai produced what is considered by some to be the first sound-on-film Chinese talkie, Spring on Stage (歌場春色). In 1932, they teamed up with Cantonese opera singer Sit Gok-Sin (薛覺先) to make the first Cantonese talkie, White Golden Dragon (白金龍). This film proved to be very successful, and in 1934, they established the Tianyi Studio (Hong Kong) in Kowloon to make Cantonese films. The move to Hong Kong was accelerated as the Nanjing government had issued a ban on martial arts films as well as Cantonese films, and two years later, they moved the entire film production operation from Shanghai to Hong Kong. Tianyi was reorganized into Nanyang (南洋) Productions with Runde Shaw as the studio head. They also announced plan for their first film production studio in Singapore in 1937 to make films in Malay; a studio was built in 1940 to make Malay and Cantonese films, followed by another called Singapore Film Studios in 1941 on Jalan Ampas. It produced Malay films under the studio named Malay Film Productions (formally incorporated in 1949) which lasted until 1967. The most prominent Malay actor, director and producer of this period was P. Ramlee.

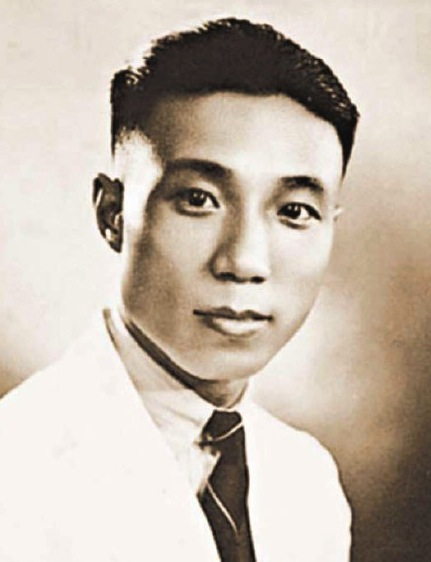
Run Run Shaw in 1927

The Shaw Brothers continued to expand but suffered a setback during the Second World War when the Japanese occupied Malaya and Singapore. After the war, they began to rebuild. In the 1950s, Nanyang started to switch film production from Cantonese to Mandarin as the communist takeover of mainland China had cut off the supply of Mandarin films to overseas Chinese communities. In this period, Nanyang Studio operated under the company name of Shaw and Sons Ltd. The Mandarin films of the 1950s were primarily wenyi films (文藝片) in a contemporary setting as well as a few period dramas.

In 1957, Run Run Shaw moved to Hong Kong, set up a new company, Shaw Brothers (Hong Kong) Ltd., and built a new studio at Clearwater Bay, which officially opened in 1961 as Movietown. In the mid-1960s, Movietown was the largest and best-equipped studio in Chinese filmmaking as well as the largest privately owned studio in the world, with 15 stages, two permanent sets, state-of-the-art film-making equipment and facilities, and 1,300 employees. Period and music dramas were popular in the 1960s, and later in the decade Kung fu films also became popular. Some of Shaw Brothers' most notable films were made in this period, including The Magnificent Concubine, The Love Eterne, as well as One-Armed Swordsman, which broke the box office records and some spawned multiple sequels. The studio popularized the kung-fu genre of films, which included Five Fingers of Death and The 36th Chamber of Shaolin made in the 1970s. The 1960s was a period of intense rivalry between Shaw Brothers and Cathay Organisation, but eventually Shaw Brothers gained the upper hand and Cathay ceased film production in 1970. Sir Run Run Shaw became involved in television when TVB was launched in 1967. In 1969, Shaw Brothers (HK) issued shares and became a public listed company.

In the 1970s, Shaw Brothers faced a strong challenge from a new studio, Golden Harvest, which had considerable success internationally with the martial arts film, Enter the Dragon starring Bruce Lee. Shaw Brothers then also began to co-produce films with Western producers for the international market and invest in films such as Meteor and Blade Runner. However, Shaw Brothers ceased film production in 1986 because of competition from Golden Harvest and increasing piracy, focusing instead on TV production. In 1986, Movietown became TV City, which was leased to TVB for TV production. In 1988, the company was reorganized under the umbrella of the Shaw Organization. In the 1990s, Shaw again started making a few films, but no longer on the same scale as before. Shaw has since relocated to a new site in Tseung Kwan O, Hong Kong.

== Legacy ==
=== Directors ===
Shaw Brothers is noted for film directors such as King Hu, Lau Kar-leung, P. Ramlee and Chang Cheh. King Hu was an early director who is best remembered for his film, Come Drink with Me, a martial arts film which differed from those of Chang Cheh in that it featured a capable female protagonist and revolved around romance in the martial arts world, rather than fast-paced action and the tales of brotherhood which Chang Cheh would later popularize. Chang Cheh, who was more fond of the latter components, would go on to be Shaw Studio's best-known director, with such films as Five Deadly Venoms, The Brave Archer (based on the works of Jin Yong), One-Armed Swordsman, and other classics of Wuxia and Wushu film. Almost equally as famous was fight-choreographer-turned-director Lau Kar-leung, who would produce such highly regarded kung fu films as The 36th Chamber of Shaolin and The Eight Diagram Pole Fighter, while P. Ramlee was known for Malay style romantics and comedy such as Nujum Pa' Belalang, Seniman Bujang Lapok and Do Re Mi.

=== Actors ===
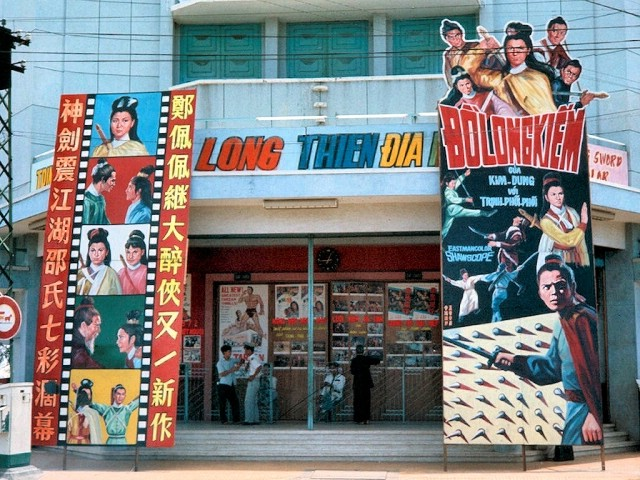
A movie theater in Saigon (today's Ho Chi Minh City), South Vietnam, 1967, advertising The Thundering Sword starring the "queen of swords" Cheng Pei-pei.

Shaw Brothers was modeled after the classic Hollywood system, with hundreds of actors signed to exclusive contracts. While other studios rotated cast members, Shaw Brothers assigned certain groups of actors to work exclusively with certain directors.

Shaw Brothers productions during the late 1950s to early 1960s were dominated by actresses like Li Li-Hua, Ivy Ling Po, Linda Lin Dai, Betty Loh Ti, Li Ching in dramatic and romantic features. In particular, the Huangmei opera The Love Eterne, starring Ivy Ling Po and Betty Loh Ti and based on the Butterfly Lovers folk legend from the Jin Dynasty, is one of the highest-grossing features of the Shaw Studio. Its huge success is in part due to the ingenious casting of Ivy Ling Po, who was a relatively unknown supporting actress, as the male lead. In the story of Butterfly Lovers, the female lead, played by Betty Loh Ti, disguised herself as a male to attend college because social mingling between the sexes was forbidden. The film resonated with its audience, and reportedly some members of the audience in Hong Kong and Taiwan repeatedly bought tickets and watched the feature in theaters over and over again in 1962, with some having watched it over 20 times.

From the late 1960s onward, production of dramatic features was reduced in favor of martial arts features. The group of actors from the 1978 release, Five Deadly Venoms, and the subsequent series of films—known by the name the Venom Mob—were among the most memorable. They were Lo Mang, Lu Feng, Sun Chien, Chiang Sheng, and Kuo Chui, who had been stars in the Shaw Studio for years, but did not become memorable faces until Five Deadly Venoms. Wei Pai, who played the Snake (referred to as "Number Two" throughout the film Five Deadly Venoms), was also part of the Venom Mob, which numbered over 15 actors who appeared in almost all of the Venom movies.

In the first half of the 1970s, two other stars were particularly renowned and favored by the "Million-Dollar Director" Chang Cheh in his movies: Ti Lung and David Chiang. He is also accredited as a capable actor who reinforced his muscular glamor with strong characterization over his many films. Chiang, on the other hand, was slight and wiry and often played the sarcastic antihero to Lung's standard archetype. Chang Cheh, with his stars Ti Lung and David Chiang, were known as the cinematic "Iron Triangle" throughout Southeast Asia. In the middle of that decade, the duo was overshadowed by the rise of Alexander Fu Sheng, who had played supporting roles opposite them on many occasions. Fu was killed in 1983 in a car accident, at age 28, ending a brief but spectacular career.

Members of the Peking Opera School, including Jackie Chan, Yuen Biao, and Sammo Hung, played extras and bit parts in several Shaw Brothers films in the 1970s, although they were unknowns at the time.

Better-known female martial arts actresses of Shaw Brothers include Cheng Pei-pei, Lily Ho, Shih Szu, Lily Li, and Kara Hui Ying-Hung. Cheng Pei-pei in particular is relatively well-known for her starring role in King Hu's Come Drink with Me and more recently in Ang Lee's Crouching Tiger, Hidden Dragon as Jade Fox.

=== Influences ===
The films produced by the Shaw Brothers Studio were highly popular among Chinese communities in Hong Kong and Southeast Asia and they would have a significant influence on later filmmakers, particularly in the kung fu genre. These films also reached the West and were popular for a time in the 1970s and early 1980s, having some influence on filmmakers such as Quentin Tarantino, who paid homage to the studio by displaying their logo in his Kill Bill: Volume 1 and 2 films and adapting the styles of some of their films.

The 2023 animated film Teenage Mutant Ninja Turtles: Mutant Mayhem also paid homage to the studio by featuring clips from classic Shaw Brothers films when the title characters were trained in martial arts by their father figure, Master Splinter (voiced by Jackie Chan, who played smaller roles in a few Shaw Brothers films), by showing them various video clips containing martial arts techniques, including clips from The 36th Chamber of Shaolin, Dirty Ho, The Magnificent Ruffians and Mad Monkey Kung Fu.

The 2025 martial arts comedy film Love Hurts also pays homage to the studio by having a poster of The Avenging Eagle (1978) placed in a video store owned by the antagonistic Alvin "Knuckles" Gable (portrayed by Hong Kong actor Daniel Wu), the leader of "The Company" who is an estranged brother of its former member Marvin Gable (played by Ke Huy Quan). Additionally, "the Raven" (played by Mustafa Shakir), uses a bladed gauntlet similar to that of Cheuk Yi Fan, played by Alexander Fu Sheng in The Avenging Eagle.

== Celestial Pictures acquisition and distribution ==
Many Shaw Brothers classic films have been bootlegged due to the popularity of particular kung fu/martial arts titles. Celestial Pictures acquired rights to the Shaw Studio's legacy and is releasing, on DVD, 760 out of the nearly 1,000 films with restored picture and sound quality. Many of these DVDs have come under controversy, however, for remixing audio and not including the original mono soundtracks.

=== Karmaloop TV's licensing deal ===
Karmaloop TV, a multi-platform programming network designed to help operators "reclaim" viewership among the 18- to 34-year-old demographic, announced its first film licensing deal with Celestial Pictures. The Hong Kong–based company owns, restores and licenses the world's largest collection of Chinese-made films including the Shaw Brothers library of fan-favourite kung fu and action classics such as The 36th Chamber of Shaolin, Five Deadly Venoms, and The One-Armed Swordsman.

The licensing deal with Karmaloop TV means that kung fu and action fans in the United States will see these films in their digitally restored versions, many of which will be premiering for the first time on U.S. television in high definition. The licensed collection includes more than 60 of the greatest martial arts masterpieces—movies which launched the careers of stars like Jimmy Wang Yu, Cheng Pei-Pei, Ti Lung, David Chiang, Alexander Fu Sheng, Chen Kuan-Tai, and Gordon Liu.

== Shaw Studios ==
The Clearwater Bay site at Clearwater Bay Road and Ngan Ying Road is the former home of Shaw Studio (built 1960 to 1961), as well as the vacated TVB headquarters and studios (1986–2003, since relocated to TVB City) and Celestial Pictures. There are also apartment blocks used to house Shaw actors. The newer Shaw House and Shaw Villa are there. The site has been vacant since 2003 and has been targeted for redevelopment several times since 2006. In 2015, Hong Kong's Antiquities Advisory Board declared the entire studio complex a site of cultural significance and subsequent redevelopment plans have included measures to restore and preserve the existing structures.

A new Shaw Studios (note the plural s) was built at Tseung Kwan O Industrial Estate and opened in stages between 2006 and 2008.

== See also ==
- Celestial's Shaw Brothers Film Library
- Golden Harvest
- Hong Kong action cinema
- List of Shaw Brothers films
- Shanghainese people in Hong Kong
