= Run Run Shaw =

Hong Kong entertainment mogul and philanthropist (1907–2014)

The Honourable Sir Run Run Shaw GBM, CBE
- 邵逸夫
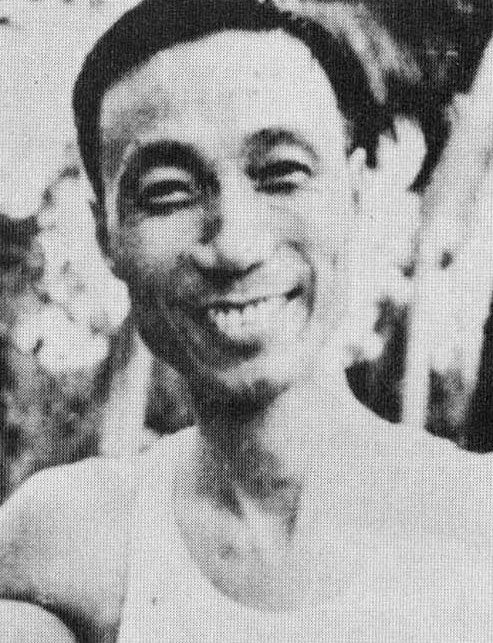
- Shaw in 1955
- Born: Shao Renleng (邵仁楞); 19 November 1907; Ningbo, China
- Died: 7 January 2014 (aged 106); Kowloon, Hong Kong
- Other names: Shao Yifu (邵逸夫); Siu Yat-fu; Uncle Six (六叔, Luk Suk)
- Occupations: Businessman, filmmaker, philanthropist
- Years active: 1925–2012
- Board member of: Shaw Brothers Studio, Television Broadcasts Ltd.
- Spouses: Wong Mee-chun (黃美珍) (m. 1931; died 1987) Mona Fong (m. 1997)
- Children: 4
- Relatives: Runje Shaw; Runde Shaw; Runme Shaw

Run Run Shaw
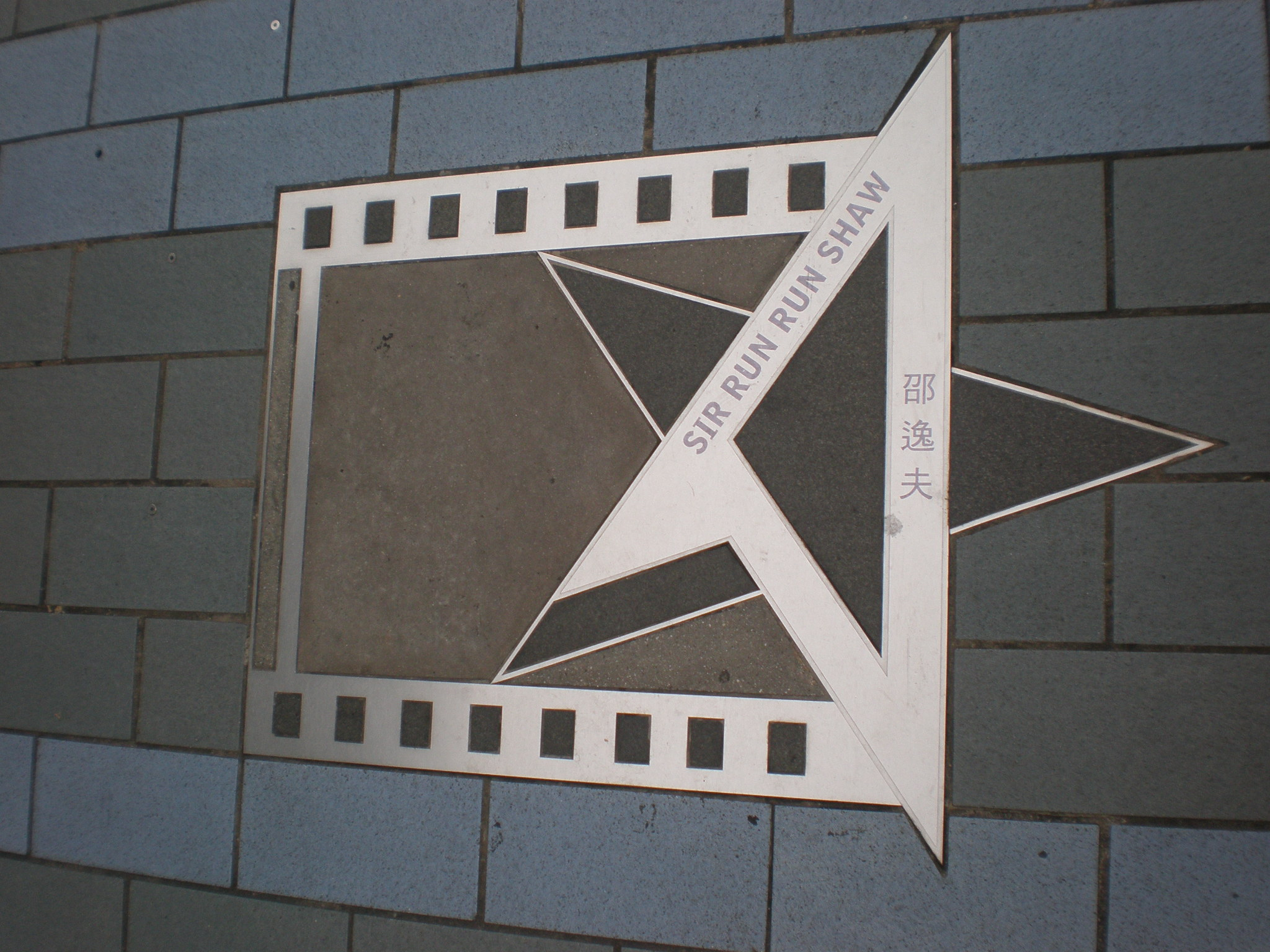
- Shaw's star on the Avenue of Stars
- Chinese: 邵逸夫
Transcriptions
Standard Mandarin
- Hanyu Pinyin: Shào Yìfū
- Wade–Giles: Shao^{4} I^{4}-fu^{2}
- Yale Romanization: Shàu Yìfū
- IPA: [ʂâʊ îfú]
Yue: Cantonese
- Yale Romanization: Siuh Yaht-Fū
- Jyutping: Siu6 Jat6 Fu1
- IPA: [ɕìːu jɐ̀t fúː]

Sir Run Run Shaw GBM CBE (born Shao Renleng; 19 November 1907 – 7 January 2014), also known as Shao Yifu and Siu Yat-fu, was a Hong Kong business tycoon, filmmaker, and philanthropist. He was one of the foremost influential movie moguls in the East Asian and Hong Kong entertainment industry. He founded the Shaw Brothers Studio, one of the largest film production companies in Hong Kong, and TVB, the dominant television company in Hong Kong.

A well-known philanthropist, Shaw donated billions of Hong Kong dollars to educational institutions in Hong Kong and mainland China. More than 5,000 buildings on Chinese college campuses bear his name, as does Shaw College of the Chinese University of Hong Kong. He also established the Shaw Prize for Astronomy, Life Science & Medicine and Mathematical Sciences.

== Early life ==
Shaw was born in Ningbo, as the youngest of the six sons of a Ningbo textile merchant who was based in Shanghai, Shaw Yuh Hsuen (邵行銀; 1866–1921), and his wife, Huang Shun Xiang (黃順香; 1871–1939). His name at birth was Shao Renleng (邵仁楞), which was later changed to Shao Yifu (邵逸夫) because he thought that the average Chinese person would not know how to pronounce the character 楞 (léng). There are a number of explanations given for the use of his English name Run Run Shaw, but Shaw reportedly said that it was simply a transcription of his birth name Shao Renleng in the Ningbo dialect.

He celebrated his birthdays on the 14th day of the 10th month of the Chinese lunisolar calendar, which fell on 23 November 2007, his 100th Chinese calendar birthday. However, the 14th day of the 10th month of the Chinese calendar corresponds to 19 November 1907 on the Gregorian calendar, which according to China Daily was his birthdate.

As a child, his family moved to Shanghai. He graduated from the Shanghai YMCA School, where he learned English.

== Career ==
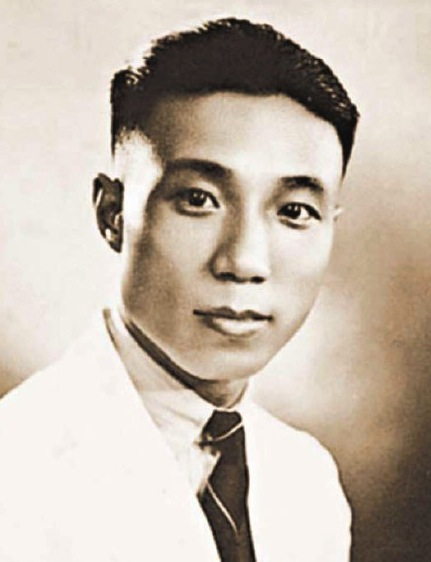
Run Run Shaw in 1927

=== Early ventures ===
In 1925, Shaw's brothers, led by the eldest brother Runje Shaw, established Tianyi Film Company (also called Unique Film Productions) in Shanghai, and Run Run Shaw began his film career doing odd jobs for the company. In 1927, Run Run Shaw, then 19 years old, went to Singapore to assist his third elder brother Runme Shaw in their business venture there, initially to market films to Southeast Asia's Chinese community. They established the company that would later become the Shaw Organisation, and were involved in distributing and producing films in Southeast Asia. Tianyi produced what is considered the first sound-on-film Chinese talkie in 1931, and made the first Cantonese sound film in 1932. It was highly successful, and Tianyi established a branch in Hong Kong in 1934.

Just before the Japanese invasion of Shanghai in 1937, Tianyi moved its operation to Hong Kong, shipping its equipment from Shanghai. Its studio in Shanghai was destroyed when the Japanese occupied the city. In Hong Kong, Tianyi was reorganised as Nanyang Studio, which later became Shaw Brothers Studio. Run Run Shaw was credited with scripting and directing the 1937 comedy film Country Bumpkin Visits His In-laws.

In his early days in Singapore, Run Run Shaw supervised the company's business while Runme travelled north to Malaya to establish ties with local theatre owners. In 1927, having noticed that there were few cinemas in Malaya, Runme decided to open four cinemas there to show their films. By 1939, the brothers owned a chain of 139 cinemas across the region; the chain would later include Singapore's first air-conditioned cinema, at Beach Road. They also established a number of amusement parks throughout the region, including Borneo, Thailand and Java, such as the Great World Amusement Park at Kim Seng Road. The brothers began to make Malay films in Singapore in 1937. Inspired by the success of films intended for Malay audiences, for example Leila Majnun in 1934, and other films from the Dutch East Indies, the brothers established Malay Film Productions (MFP). This company would eventually produce over 160 Malay films, many of them starring and directed by P. Ramlee, until their studio at Jalan Ampas ceased production in 1967. The period between the end of the 1940s and the beginning of the 1960s is known as the Golden Age of Malay Cinema, with over 300 films made between MFP and Cathay Keris. In 1941, the Japanese invaded Singapore and Malaya and confiscated their film equipment. According to Run Run Shaw, he and his brother went into hiding during the war and buried more than $4 million in gold, jewellery and cash in their backyard, digging it up after the war and using it to rebuild their business.

=== Shaw Brothers Studios ===
In 1957, Run Run Shaw moved to Hong Kong, which was emerging as the new centre of Chinese-language cinema, and reorganised Tianyi's operations there as Shaw Brothers Studio. Shaw copied Hollywood by setting up a permanent production site where his actors worked and lived on 46 acres purchased from the government in Clearwater Bay. At the opening of the Shaw Movietown in December 1961, Shaw Studios had the world's largest privately owned film-production outfit with about 1,200 workers shooting and editing films daily. Shaw productions ran up to two hours and cost as much as $50,000, a lavish sum by Asian standards in the 1960s.

By the 1960s, Shaw Brothers had become the biggest producer of movies in Asia. Notable films produced by Shaw include director Li Han-hsiang's The Magnificent Concubine, which took the Grand Prix at the 1962 Cannes Film Festival; the 1963 blockbuster musical film The Love Eterne, also directed by Li Han-hsiang; King Hu's 1966 pioneering wuxia film Come Drink with Me; and Chang Cheh's 1967 The One-Armed Swordsman, which broke box office records. His companies in Shanghai, Singapore and Hong Kong made more than 1,000 movies, with annual production peaking at 50 pictures in 1974 when Shaw was described as the "Czar of Asian Movies". The popular nostalgic costume dramas of Shaw Brothers celebrated traditional Chinese values and culture, which was in contrast to the then anti-traditional ideology of Communist mainland China (particularly during the Cultural Revolution), but fit with the policy of the Nationalist government of Taiwan and US anti-Communist strategy, while not conflicting with the less provocative approach of the colonial government of Hong Kong. Shaw Studios also popularised an early (Wuxia) variant of kung fu film genre that had influence on directors such as John Woo and Quentin Tarantino.

The studio, which held virtual monopoly of filmmaking in Hong Kong, declined in the 1970s, partly due to competition from Golden Harvest formed by Raymond Chow and employing many former ex-employees of Shaw that have been dismissed. Golden Harvest came to prominence through Bruce Lee whom Shaw Brothers had previously turned down. Shaw began to focus his efforts on television. Shaw also looked for opportunities in the United States and co-produced a handful of US films, including the 1982 sci-fi classic Blade Runner. In 2000, through his company, Shaw Brothers (Hong Kong) Limited, he sold his library of 760 classic titles to Celestial Pictures Limited. Shaw Studios also entered a new era with Shaw's majority investment (through his various holding companies) in the US$180,000,000 Hong Kong Movie City project, a 1,100,000 square feet (100,000 m^{2}) studio and production facility in Tseung Kwan O.

=== Television Broadcasts Limited ===
In 1967, he co-founded TVB, the first free-to-air television station in Hong Kong, growing it into a multibillion-dollar TV empire with channels broadcast in 30 markets including the US, Canada and Taiwan, making it the world's largest producer of Chinese-language programs. Shaw took a greater interest in TVB after succeeding the deceased Harold Lee as its chairman in 1980. Shaw leased most of Shaw Brothers' filmmaking facilities to TVB in 1983. Under his chairmanship, TVB successfully launched the careers of international stars such as Chow Yun-fat and Maggie Cheung, singers such as Leslie Cheung and Anita Mui, and directors like Wong Kar-wai. In 2006, TVB had 80 percent of Hong Kong's viewers and 78 percent of the city's TV advertising market.

On 31 December 2011, Shaw retired as chairman of Television Broadcasts Ltd. at the age of 104 after more than 40 years at Hong Kong's biggest television company, after selling his controlling stake to a group of investors including HTC Corporation chairman Cher Wang and ITC Corporation chairman Charles Chan for HK$6.26 billion in March. He was then named chairman emeritus. Shaw was one of the largest shareholders in Macy's after buying 10 percent of its preferred shares for US$50 million when it was nearly bankrupt in 1991.

== Community life ==
Shaw was an advocate and financial supporter of the Hong Kong Arts Festival in which he became the first chairman of the festival. He was also the chairman of the Hong Kong Arts Centre's board of governors. He was a member of the board of trustees of United College, one of the colleges of the Chinese University of Hong Kong when the university began in 1967. He became the vice-chairman of the board of trustees in 1972 and was appointed to the University Council of the Chinese University in 1977. Other public posts included vice-president of the Hong Kong Girl Guides Association and the Hong Kong Society for Rehabilitation. He was also the first Asian president of the Hong Kong Red Cross, and a leading figure in the fund raising of the Community Chest of Hong Kong since its inception.

== Philanthropy ==
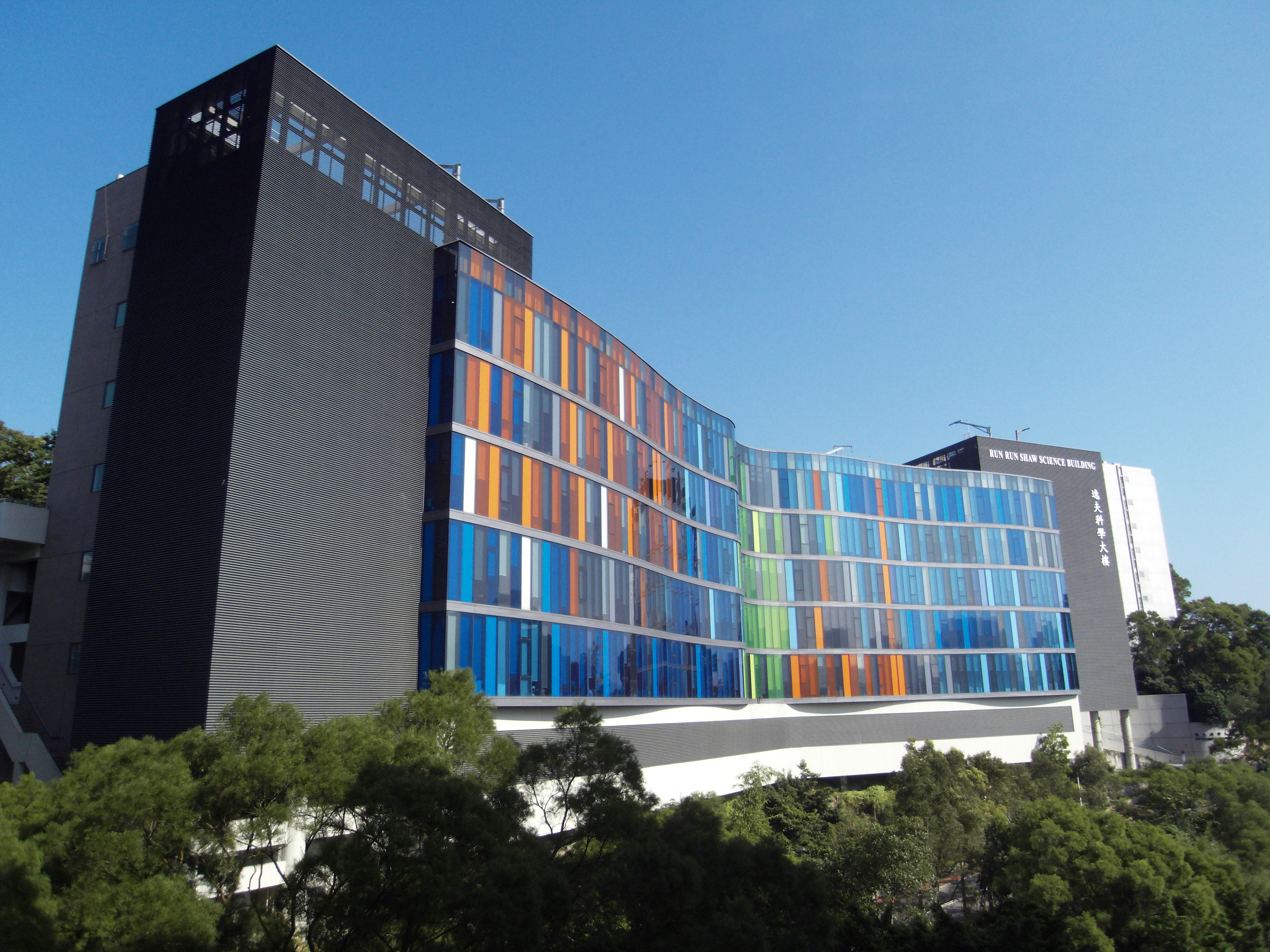
Run Run Shaw Science Building, Chinese University of Hong Kong

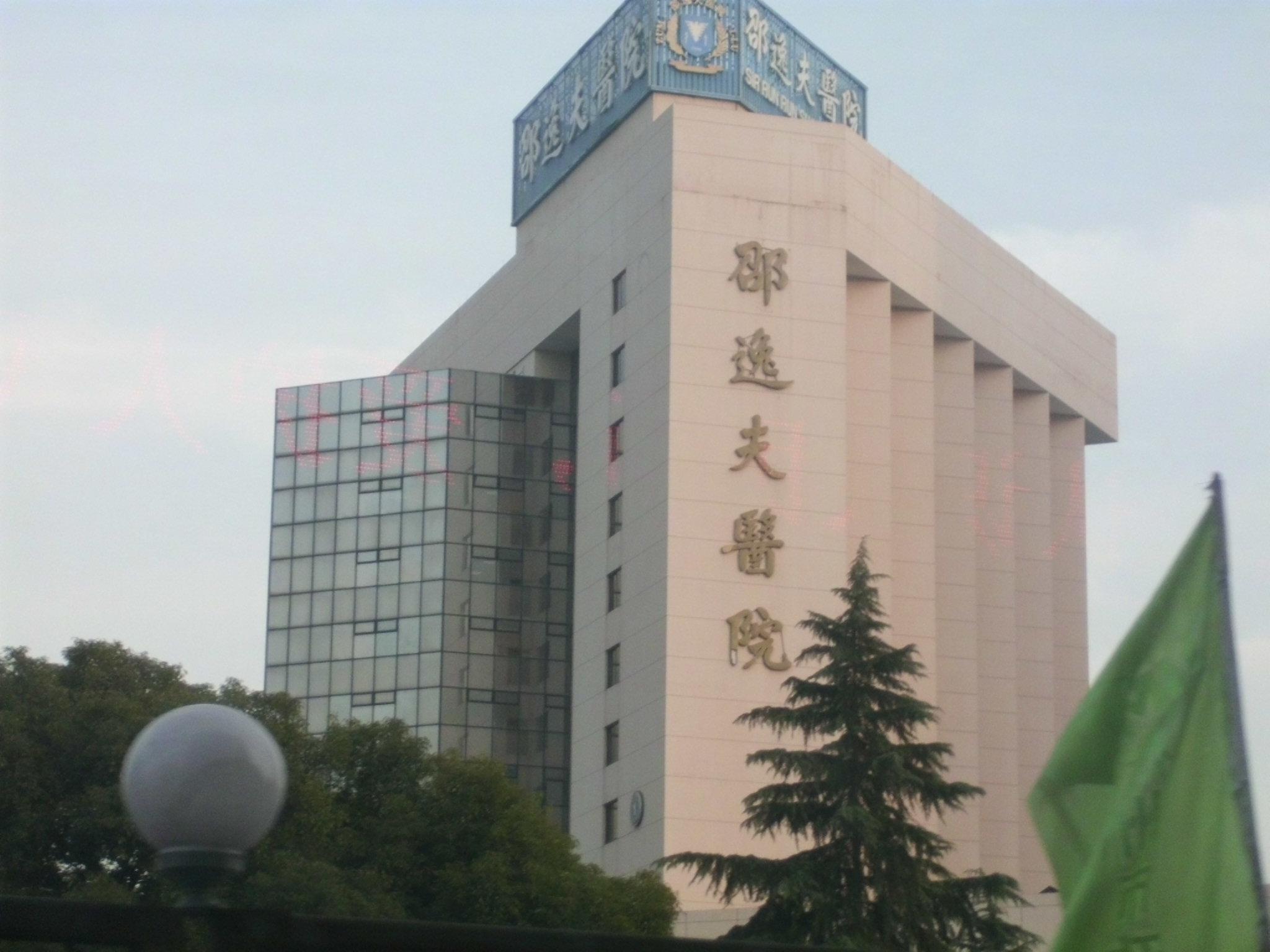
Sir Run Run Shaw Hospital in Hangzhou, China

Over the years, Shaw donated HK$6.5 billion to charities, schools and hospitals in Hong Kong and mainland China through the Sir Run Run Shaw Charitable Trust and the Shaw Foundation, including donations of HK$4.75 billion to educational institutions in mainland China, which helped to build 6,013 construction projects ranging from primary schools to university libraries. More than 5,000 buildings in China's college campuses bear Shaw's Chinese name, "Yifu", which has become so ubiquitous that many mistake it as a generic name. Shaw College, the fourth constituent college of the Chinese University of Hong Kong, is also named after him, whose donations made the establishment of the college possible. His other major donations include 10 million British pounds in 1990 to help establish the Run Run Shaw Institute of Chinese Affairs at Oxford University, and US$13 million for disaster relief after the 2008 Sichuan earthquake.

=== Shaw Prize ===
In 2002, Shaw established an international award, the Shaw Prize, for scientists in three areas of research, namely astronomy, mathematics, and life and medical science. The award is up to US$1 million, and the first prize was awarded in 2004.

== Personal life ==
The sixth of the seven children in the Shaw family, he was nicknamed Uncle Six (Luk Sook). His three elder brothers, Runje Shaw, Runde Shaw and Runme Shaw, were all heads of the Shaw Studio. Runme Shaw, the third elder brother, who co-founded the Shaw Studio with him, died in 1985.

Shaw's first wife was Lily Wong Mee-chun, who died at age 85 in 1987. In 1997, he married Mona Fong in Las Vegas. A former singer, Mona Fong joined TVB as a procurement manager in 1969 and became the deputy chairman of TVB in 2000. Shaw had four children with his first wife: sons Vee Meng and Harold, and daughters Violet and Dorothy. All of his children studied at Oxford University.

Shaw was a lover of Rolls-Royce limousines and a keen practitioner of qigong. Mr. Bean was reportedly his favourite show.

== Death ==
Shaw died at his residence on 7 January 2014, at the age of 106. He was survived by his four children, nine grandchildren and several great-grandchildren. The family did not provide the cause of death.

His body was transferred from the United Christian Hospital to the Hong Kong Funeral Home in North Point on 10 January 2014. Many local leaders attended the funeral that day, including former chief executives Tung Chee-hwa and Donald Tsang. Shaw's remains were brought to the Cape Collinson Crematorium in Chai Wan later the same day. General Secretary of the Chinese Communist Party Xi Jinping, former Premier of China Wen Jiabao and Chairman of the National People's Congress Zhang Dejiang sent messages of respect.

== Honours ==
In 1964, after their discovery of a small main belt asteroid between Mars and Jupiter, Chinese astronomers at the Purple Mountain Observatory named it "2899 Runrun Shaw" in Shaw's honour.

In 1974, Shaw was appointed a Commander of the Order of the British Empire (CBE). He received a knighthood in 1977 from Queen Elizabeth II and the Grand Bauhinia Medal (GBM) from the Hong Kong government in 1998.

He was awarded an honorary degree of Doctor of Social Science by the Chinese University of Hong Kong in 1981 for his contribution to the university and community. In 1984, he was awarded an honorary degree of Doctor of Laws by the University of Hong Kong to honour an outstanding contribution to applied visual arts, as well as to the community and cultural developments.

In 2007, coinciding with his 100th birthday, he was honoured with the Lifetime Achievement Award at the Hong Kong Film Awards.

In 2013, Shaw received the BAFTA Special Award for his outstanding contribution to cinema.

== In popular culture ==
Portrayed by Douglas Lim in P. Ramlee The Musical.

== See also ==
- Shaw Professor of Chinese
- Asteroid 2899 Runrun Shaw
- Brothers Runje Shaw, Runme Shaw and Runde Shaw
- Cinema of Hong Kong
- List of centenarians (businesspeople)

Business positions
Preceded by Harold Lee	Executive Chairman of TVB; 1980–2010	Succeeded by Mona Fong
