= Shaw Organisation =

Singaporean film distributor and movie-theatre chain

- Type: Private company
- Industry: Media, Entertainment
- Founded: 1928; 98 years ago
- Founders: Run Run Shaw; Runme Shaw
- Headquarters: Singapore
- Products: Cinemas, Film distribution
- Divisions: Shaw Services (Pte) Ltd
- Website: shaw.sg

Shaw Organisation is a film distribution company and cinema chain founded by brothers Runme Shaw and Run Run Shaw who went to Singapore in the 1920s to expand their family business founded by Runje Shaw. The company originally operated as a distributor for the Shaw brothers' Tianyi Film Company (also called Unique) in Shanghai. Run Run Shaw later moved to Hong Kong in the 1950s to run Shaw Brothers Studio, whilst Runme Shaw stayed in Singapore to continue Shaw Organisation's operations. Unlike Tianyi, Shaw Organisation does not produce films, but distributes them in their theatres.

== History ==
The Shaw Organisation has a long history in Singapore since its founding in 1928. They bought the land on which the Shaw House now stands, in 1952. The plot of land was originally granted to William Scott in 1845. About 500,000 square feet of land was levelled to build the original Shaw House and the adjacent Lido Theatre.

The company managed single-screen cinemas until the late 1980s, when it decided to build cineplexes to give more flexibility in offering different types of films. The first cineplexes built were the Prince and Jade cineplexes in Shaw Towers, opened in February 1988. Cineplexes have now become the standard for cinemas offering varied shows for smaller crowds.

The Shaw Organisation was founded in 1928 when Tan Runme Shaw (1901–1985) arrived in Singapore from Shanghai. He was the third of seven children of a Shanghai textile merchant, Shaw Yuh Hsuen (1867–1920).

In Shanghai, Runme's eldest brother Runje Shaw had founded the Tianyi Film Company (a.k.a Unique). Not satisfied with the domestic market, the Shaw brothers sought business opportunities elsewhere, especially in Southeast Asia. Runme, as distribution manager, was tasked to search for a suitable investment city. Runme's original destination was Indochina where he hoped to meet with the film distributors. However, he was denied permission to land there and instead, he ended up in Singapore, creating the Shaw Organisation. He was joined by his younger brother, Sir Run Run Shaw, two years later.

After the Great Depression, the Shaws decided to diversify their risk by branching out from their entertainment business into areas such as amusement parks. They brought in ideas from abroad and modelled the parks after those in Shanghai, which proved to be popular amongst the local population.

From the mid-1930s to the 1980s, Shaw operated two popular fairgrounds – Great World Amusement Park and New World Amusement Park.

At its height, the company owned multiple cinemas and amusement parks across Singapore, Malaysia and Borneo, and established Shaw Brothers Studio in Hong Kong.

By August 2000, a computerised ticketing system, developed jointly with Singapore Computer Systems, was launched. This system linked all Shaw theatres into a single network for automated telephone credit card purchases. With its extensive infrastructure, Shaw is now the biggest distributor of Asian cinema. Today, it manages and runs 84 screens in 8 locations in Singapore.

== Business operations ==
Shaw Theatres currently operates eight cinemas and 84 screens in Singapore.

=== Current locations ===
Cinema	Screens	Seats	Location	Opening Year	Digital Hall	IMAX	3D Digital Hall	Shaw Premiere	Shaw Lumiere	Dreamers
Lido (Shaw House)	11	1978	Orchard	1993	✓	✓	✓	✓	✓	✓
Lot One	8	664	Choa Chu Kang	1996	✓	✗	✓	✗	✗	✗
Balestier (Shaw Plaza)	11	721	Balestier	1999	✓	✗	✓	✗	✓	✓
Nex	10	1285	Serangoon	2010	✓	✗	✓	✓	✗	✗
Waterway Point	11	1450	Punggol	2016	✓	✓	✓	✗	✗	✗
Jewel	11	828	Changi Airport	2019	✓	✓	✓	✗	✓	✓
Paya Lebar Quarter	12	986	Geylang East	2019	✓	✓	✓	✗	✓	✗
Jem	10	1186	Jurong East	2025	✓	✓	✓	✓	✗	✓

=== Former locations ===
Cinema	Screens	Seats	Location	Opening Year	Closed Year
Bugis Junction	3	1080	Downtown Core	2001	2016
Century Square	6	979	Tampines	1995	2017
Changi	3	1154	Bedok	1980	2000
Chinatown Point	2	684	Chinatown	1991	1999
Great World	4		River Valley	1936	1992
Hoover	1	900	Balestier	1960	1996
JCube	7	1010	Jurong East	2012	2023
Oriental	2		Chinatown	1990	2000
President	1	1200	Balestier	1973	1996
Republic	3		Marine Parade	1980	1999
Roxy	1	1200	Katong	1931	1978
Savoy	2		Boon Lay	1980s	1998
Seletar	8	764	Sengkang	2014	2024
Shaw Tower	4	1200	Downtown Core	2001	2009
Taman Jurong	1		Jurong	1970s	1990s
Vision	4	1200	Hougang	1993	2000
Woodlands	2	619	Woodlands	1980	1999

=== Commercial properties ===
Besides its involvement in film distribution, Shaw Organisation had investments in properties as well. The most prominent of which is Shaw House located at 350 Orchard Road with Isetan as its anchor tenant. To date, Shaw House is still the organisation's largest project in Singapore. It took three years to construct and was finally completed in 1993.

Other commercial properties owned by Shaw Organisation includes the Shaw Plaza, Shaw Centre, Shaw Corner, Oriental Plaza, Balestier Warehouse, North Bridge Road Shophouse and Mackenzie Road Shophouse.

Commercial Property	Type	Location	Description
Shaw Plaza	Shopping mall	360 Balestier Road, Singapore 329783	A modern 5-storey shopping mall with a 2-storey annexe block. Last renovated in 2023.
Shaw House	Office tower	350 Orchard Road, Singapore 238868	A 21-storey office building with a 6-storey retail/ entertainment complex.
Shaw Centre	Shopping mall & office towers	1 Scotts Road, Singapore 228208	A 27-storey office building with a 5-storey retail and F&B mall.
Shaw Corner	Intermediate apartment	12 Boon Teck Road, Singapore 329586	A 4-storey commercial building.
Oriental Plaza	Duplex apartment	291 New Bridge Road, Singapore 088756	A 4-storey commercial building.
North Bridge Road Shophouse	Duplex apartment	791/ 791A/ 791B North Bridge Road, Singapore	A 2-storey shophouse with an attic
Balestier Warehouse	Duplex apartment	12A Jalan Ampas, Singapore 329526	A 9-storey warehouse development.
Mackenzie Road Shophouse	Duplex apartment	13 Mackenzie Road, Singapore 228676	A 4-storey shophouse.

=== Residential projects ===
Shaw Organisation also owns residential properties in Singapore. The two notable ones are Twin Heights and Hullet Rise. Others are single houses, with the exception of Jalan Sampurna which is a plot of land with two houses.

Residential Property	Type	Location	Description
Twin Heights	Condominium	350 Balestier Road, Singapore 329779; 352 Balestier Road, Singapore 329780	Two 21-storey freehold apartment blocks comprising 2 and 3-bedroom apartments and four penthouses.
Hullet Rise	Apartment block	6 Hullet Rise, Singapore 229159	A 16-storey apartment block comprising bedroom apartments.
25 Jalan Sampurna	Semi-detached house	25 Jalan Sampurna, Singapore 268303	2 houses on the same plot of land with symmetrical layouts.
23 Fernhill Road	Intermediate apartment	23 Fernhill Road, Singapore 259075	A 3-storey intermediate apartment with a car porch.
45 Coronation Road West	Duplex apartment	Singapore 269261	2-storey detached duplex apartment with car porch and swimming pools.
43 Coronation Road West	Duplex apartment	Singapore 266204	2-storey detached duplex apartment with car porch and swimming pools.

== Subsidiaries ==
Shaw Organisation Pte Ltd owns the Shaw Properties Pte Ltd and Shaw Theatres Pte Ltd. Shaw Properties Pte Ltd oversees the operations in property development, acquisition and leasing whilst Shaw Theatres Pte Ltd oversees the operations in film purchase, distribution and the cinema's food and beverages.

== Charity ==
=== Shaw Foundation ===
The Shaw Foundation was set up in 1957 by the Shaw brothers and is currently one of the largest philanthropic organisations in the world. Most of the money comes from its revenue from the properties under Shaw Properties Pte Ltd. All earnings from the Shaw Centre since the late 1970s have been given to charitable organisations.

The largest amount that the Shaw Foundation has ever set aside was SGD 17.7 million in 1999. The largest share of the funding went to the National Kidney Foundation and most of its recipients were in the healthcare sector.

In the educational sector, the Shaw Foundation has been a regular donor to the National University of Singapore (NUS) since 1987, awarding around 240 scholarships to date.

Dr. Vee Meng Shaw is currently the chairman of the Shaw Foundation. He is also the eldest son of Run Run Shaw.

==== National Kidney Foundation Singapore scandal ====
The major recipient of Shaw Foundation's donations, the National Kidney Foundation (NKF) of Singapore was caught in a scandal mainly involving the misuse of donation funds of NKF. The incident circled around then chief executive officer, T.T Durai understating NKF's reserves and exaggerating the number of patients to encourage more donations, using the funds for personal reasons such as maintaining his personal car, travelling frequently on first class flights and an installation of a 'golden tap' in his private office suite. Durai dropped NKF's claims against the Singapore Press Holdings on 13 July 2005 after making several confessions during the trial and the entire board of NKF resigned on 14 July 2005.

Since the incident, there has been a said irreversible effect on trust issues for donations to charitable organisations in Singapore, including Shaw Foundation. For NKF itself, donations plummeted from $73 million in 2004 to $21 million in 2013 – signifying the lasting impact of the incident.

== Incidents ==
On 30 August 2020 at about 4.45pm, a piece of ventilation duct was dislodged on a cinema hall in the nex outlet while screening Tenet, resulting in two injuries. A spokesperson informed that the outlet would be temporarily closed until further notice. The theatre later resumed operations on 18 March 2021.

== See also ==
- List of cinemas in Singapore
- Cathay Cineplexes
- Golden Village
- WE Cinemas
- Shaw Theatre
