= Runje Shaw =

Hong Kong businessman

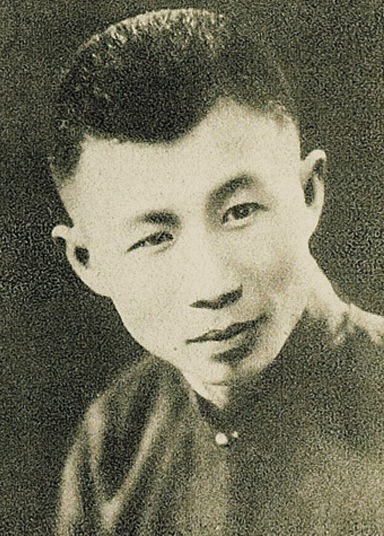
- Shaw's portrait on a 1934 issue of Liangyou magazine
- Born: Shao Renjie; 1896; Ningbo, Zhejiang, China
- Died: 1975 (aged 78–79); Shanghai, China
- Other name: Shao Zuiweng
- Education: Shenzhou University
- Occupations: Entrepreneur, filmmaker
- Known for: Founding Tianyi Film Company
- Spouse: Chen Yumei (m. 1934–1975)
- Children: 6
- Relatives: Runde Shaw; Runme Shaw; Run Run Shaw

Shao Zuiweng
- Chinese: 邵醉翁
Transcriptions
Standard Mandarin
- Hanyu Pinyin: Shào Zuìwēng

Shao Renjie
- Traditional Chinese: 邵仁傑
- Simplified Chinese: 邵仁杰
Transcriptions
Standard Mandarin
- Hanyu Pinyin: Shào Rénjié

Runje Shaw (1896–1975), also known as Shao Zuiweng (C.W. Shaw) and Shao Renjie, was a Chinese film entrepreneur, producer and director. The eldest of the Shaw brothers, in 1925 he founded Tianyi Film Company (also called Unique Film Productions) in Shanghai, which became one of the top three film production companies in pre-WWII Republic of China, and the beginning of the Shaw Brothers media empire.

Under Runje's leadership, his younger brothers Runde, Runme, and Run Run established branches of Tianyi in Hong Kong and Singapore. Runje retired from filmmaking after Tianyi's Shanghai base was destroyed in 1937 during the Japanese invasion, but his younger brothers, particularly Sir Run Run, rebuilt Tianyi's offshoots in Hong Kong and Singapore, of which Shaw Brothers Studio came to dominate filmmaking in Hong Kong.

== Early life ==
Shaw was born in 1896 in Zhenhai, Ningbo city, Zhejiang. His birth name was Shao Tongzhang (邵同章) and Renjie (仁傑) was his courtesy name. After founding Tianyi, he went by the hao Zuiweng (醉翁, literally "Drunken Man"). He was the oldest of six sons of Shao Yuxuan (or Shaw Yuh Hsuen, Chinese: 邵玉軒; 1866–1921), owner of the Shanghai textile firm Jin Tai Chang (錦泰昌).

In 1914 Shaw graduated from Shanghai's Shenzhou University with a law degree and worked as a lawyer for the local court of Shanghai. He later went into business, trading textile dyes, silk, paper, etc. He also cofounded the Sino-French Zhenye Bank (中法振業銀行) with several partners and started Huayou Egg Factory, before getting into the theatre business.

== Film career ==
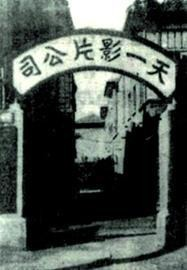
The gate of Tianyi Film Company in Hongkew, Shanghai

In early 1922, Shaw managed the theatre Xiao Wutai (Happy Stage or Laughter Stage) in Shanghai. Among his colleagues were Zhang Shichuan, Zheng Zhengqiu and Zhou Jianyun, who co-founded Mingxing Film Company. In 1923 Mingxing released the film Orphan Rescues Grandfather to great commercial success. Inspired by his former colleagues, Shaw established Tianyi Film Company (also known as Unique) in 1925. He served as general manager and director, while his younger brothers Runde Shaw (Shao Cunren) and Runme Shaw (Shao Renmei) managed accounting and distribution. The youngest brother, Run Run Shaw (Shao Yifu), did odd jobs for the company.

Tianyi's first film, A Change of Heart, directed by Runje Shaw himself and released in 1925, was highly profitable. A shrewd businessman who understood the audiences' preferences, Shaw was one of the first Chinese filmmakers to make extensive use of traditional literature, legends, and myths. Tianyi made highly successful genre films, including costume drama, swordplay, and gods and ghosts, inspiring numerous imitations from other studios. The studio's 1925 film Swordswoman Li Feifei is considered the earliest Chinese martial arts film.

In 1926, Tianyi released two highly successful costume dramas: The Lovers (Liang Zhu Tongshi, based on the legend of Liang Shanbo and Zhu Yingtai), and White Snake (based on the eponymous legend), both directed by Shaw. In addition to success in the domestic market, White Snake also became the most successful Chinese film in Southeast Asia.

Under Shaw's leadership, Tianyi was one of the first filmmakers to take the leap from silent films to sound. In 1931, Shaw produced A Singer's Story, one of the earliest Chinese sound films, directed by Li Pingqian. Unlike other major studios, which produced politically charged, socially conscious leftist films, Tianyi mainly focussed on making apolitical "entertainment" films. By the 1930s, Tianyi had become one of the top Chinese film studios, along with Mingxing and Lianhua.

Besides Shanghai, Shaw also established business operations in Hong Kong and Southeast Asia. Just before the Japanese invasion of Shanghai in August 1937, Tianyi shipped its equipment to Hong Kong, and amalgamated the main operation with its Hong Kong branch, Nanyang Studio. Its studio in Shanghai was destroyed when the Japanese occupied the city, and Shaw closed Tianyi.

== Personal life ==
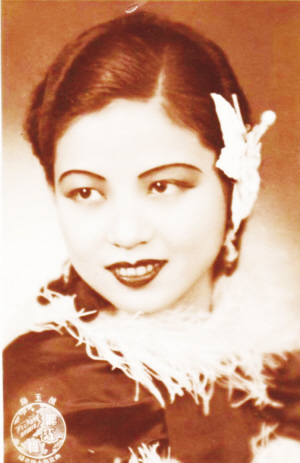
Shaw's wife Chen Yumei

Runje Shaw was married to actress Chen Yumei, who became Tianyi's number one star after Hu Die defected to rival Mingxing Studio in 1928. In 1934, Chen Yumei was voted the "Movie Queen" by the Shanghai newspaper "Movie Life", likely with the help of Shaw, who reportedly bought many of the votes. However, in the same year Chen married Shaw and retired from acting.

== Retirement ==
After World War II and the Communist victory in mainland China, Runje Shaw retired from the film industry and stayed in Shanghai. His younger brothers, meanwhile, rebuilt their businesses in Singapore and Hong Kong. Under Run Run Shaw's leadership, Shaw Brothers Studio became Hong Kong's largest and most influential film production company. After the founding of the People's Republic of China, Runje Shaw served as a member of the Shanghai Chinese People's Political Consultative Conference. He died in Shanghai in 1975, aged 80.

== Selected filmography ==
Shaw's works include:

- Reunion
- Flying General
- Incident in the Pacific
- Deadly Rose
- Compassion
- Fisherman's Girl
- Love and Morality
- Monster of the Secret Chamber
- My Friend, the Ghost
- Patriotic Woman
- Woman of Guangzhou
- Burning of The Efang Palace
- Butterfly Lovers, Part 1
- Butterfly Lovers, Part 2
- Country Bumpkin Tours the City
- Country Bumpkin Tours the City, The Sequel
- Country Bumpkin Tours the City, Part Three
- Life
- Nocturnal Morning
- Unworthy of Love
- Mourning of the Chaste Tree Flower
- Platinum Dragon
- Nightclub Colours
- Humanities
- Lady Mengjiang
- Love Eternal
- Swordswoman Li Feifei
- New Leaf
- Duel Between Monkey King and Gold-Spotted Leopard

== See also ==
- Cinema of China
- Cinema of Hong Kong
- Shaw Brothers Studio
- Shaw Organisation
