= Tianyi Film Company =

Film production company in Hong Kong

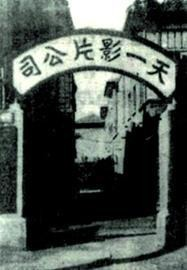
- Native name: 天一影片公司
- Industry: Film
- Founded: 1925
- Founder: Runje Shaw; Runde Shaw; Runme Shaw; Run Run Shaw
- Defunct: 1937
- Successor: Shaw Organisation; Shaw Brothers Studio
- Headquarters: Shanghai, China

Tianyi Film Company (Chinese: 天一影片公司; pinyin: Tiānyī Yǐngpiān Gōngsī), also called Unique Film Productions, was one of the "big three" film production companies in pre-Second World War Republic of China. Founded in Shanghai in 1925 by the Shaw (Shao) brothers led by Runje Shaw (Shao Zuiweng), the company also established operations in Malaya and Hong Kong. Although the company's Shanghai studio was destroyed in 1937 during the Japanese invasion, its offshoot in Hong Kong, later called Shaw Brothers Studio, blossomed into a media empire under the leadership of the youngest brother, Sir Run Run Shaw.

== Founding ==
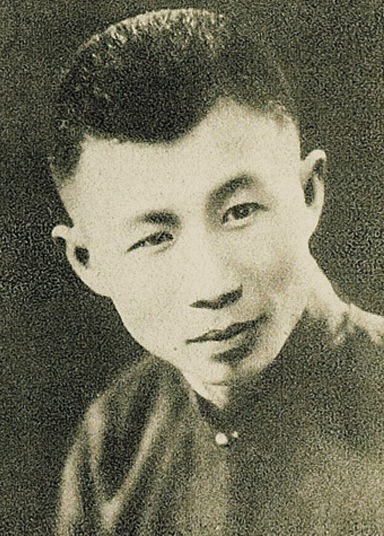
Runje Shaw (Shao Zuiweng), the oldest Shaw brother and founder of Tianyi

In 1922, Runje Shaw (Shao Zuiweng), the eldest Shaw brother who had been a lawyer and businessman, was the manager of the theatre Xiao Wutai (Happy Stage or Laughter Stage) in Shanghai. Among his colleagues were Zhang Shichuan, Zheng Zhengqiu, and Zhou Jianyun, who co-founded Mingxing Film Company. In 1923 Mingxing released the film Orphan Rescues Grandfather to great commercial success. Inspired by his former colleagues, Shao established Tianyi Film Company in 1925. He served as general manager and director, while his younger brothers Runde Shaw (Shao Cunren) and Runme Shaw (Shao Renmei) managed accounting and distribution. The youngest brother, Run Run Shaw (Shao Yifu), did odd jobs for the company.

== History ==
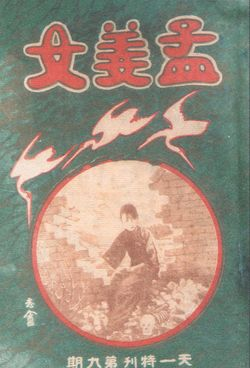
1926 Tianyi film Lady Meng Jiang, starring Hu Die

=== 1920s ===
Tianyi's first film, A Change of Heart (立地成佛), directed by Shao Zuiweng himself and released in 1925, was highly profitable. A shrewd businessman who understood the audiences' preferences, Shao was one of the first Chinese filmmakers to make extensive use of traditional literature, legends, and myths. Tianyi made highly successful genre films, including costume drama, swordplay, and gods and ghosts, inspiring numerous imitations from other studios. The studio's 1925 film Heroine Li Feifei is considered by some as the earliest Chinese martial arts film.

In 1926, Tianyi released two highly successful costume dramas: The Lovers (Liang Zhu Tongshi, based on the legend of Liang Shanbo and Zhu Yingtai), and White Snake (based on the eponymous legend), both directed by Shao Zuiweng. In addition to success in the domestic market, White Snake also became the most successful Chinese film in Southeast Asia.

=== 1930s ===
By the 1930s, Tianyi had become one of the top Chinese film studios, along with Mingxing and Lianhua. Unlike other major studios, which produced politically charged, socially conscious leftist films, Tianyi mainly focussed on making apolitical "entertainment" films.

Tianyi was one of the first filmmakers to take the leap from silent films to sound. In 1931, Shaw produced A Singer's Story (歌場春色), one of the earliest Chinese sound films, directed by Li Pingqian. The film White Gold Dragon (1933) was the first Cantonese language sound film, inspired by Shao's encounter with the popular Cantonese opera of the same name; the film was very successful in Hong Kong, Macao and throughout Southeast Asia. Starting in 1934, Tianyi made a series of Mr. Wang comedy films adapted from the popular comic strip of Ye Qianyu.

=== World War II ===
With the success of White Gold Dragon within the Cantonese-speaking Chinese communities, Shao moved Tianyi to Hong Kong in late 1933, following the Kuomintang censorship decrees against the Cantonese language in the arts and literature. Joined there by his brother RunRun, the company became a major in establishing Cantonese talking cinema in Hong Kong. After the Shao brothers recovered from the Japanese occupation of Hong Kong and Singapore during World War II, they expanded their film distribution business to include foreign films from the United States, England, France and India.

== International expansion ==
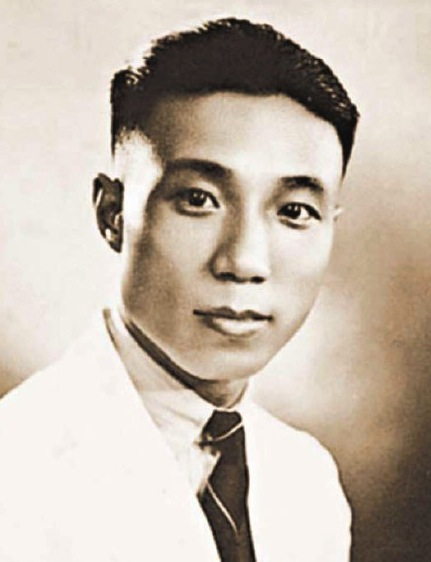
Sir Run Run Shaw (Shao Yifu), the youngest Shaw brother who expanded the business in Singapore and Hong Kong

Besides Shanghai, Tianyi also expanded its business to Southeast Asia and Hong Kong. In the mid-1920s, Shao Zuiweng sent Runme and Run Run to Singapore, then part of British Malaya, where they established a company called the Shaw Organisation to distribute films made by Tianyi. Around 1930, the Shaw brothers set up Nanyang (South Seas) Film Studio to produce films.

In 1933, Tianyi released White Gold Dragon, the first Cantonese talkie ever produced, which was a commercial success in southern China. Tianyi subsequently established a studio in Hong Kong in 1933–34 to produce Cantonese films. The move to Hong Kong was accelerated by the banning of martial arts films by the Chinese government as these films were thought to be morally decadent and promote superstition, as well as a ban on Cantonese films. Both of these genres were important to Tianyi as they were very popular among the Chinese diaspora communities, and Tianyi exported its Mandarin films produced in Shanghai and Cantonese films produced in Hong Kong throughout Southeast Asia. Its Hong Kong studio was destroyed by a fire in 1936, but Runde Shaw, the second eldest brother, reestablished the business as Nanyang Studio, later renamed Shaw and Sons.

== Demise in Shanghai ==
Just before the Japanese invasion of Shanghai in August 1937, Tianyi shipped its equipment to Hong Kong, and amalgamated the main operation with its Hong Kong branch, Nanyang Studio. Its studio in Shanghai was destroyed when the Japanese occupied the city, and Shao Zuiweng closed Shanghai-based Tianyi. The other major studios of Shanghai, Mingxing and Lianhua, also suffered fatal damage. The Shaws' operations in Hong Kong and Southeast Asia later also suffered setbacks during World War II, when the Japanese confiscated their theatres and imprisoned Run Run Shaw.

== Legacy ==
After World War II and the Communist victory in mainland China, Shao Zuiweng retired from the film industry and stayed in Shanghai. His younger brothers, meanwhile, rebuilt their businesses in Singapore and Hong Kong. When Hong Kong emerged as the new centre for Chinese-language filmmaking, Run Run Shaw moved there from Singapore in 1957, and reorganized the Tianyi operations (renamed Nanyang in Hong Kong in 1937) into Shaw Brothers Studio. Under Sir Run Run's leadership, Shaw Brothers became Hong Kong's largest and most influential film production company from the early 1960s until the mid-1980s. Shaw later concentrated on TVB, which became the dominant television company in Hong Kong.

== See also ==
- Cinema of China
- Cinema of Hong Kong
- List of Chinese film-production companies before 1949
