= Shaw (name) =

Shaw is primarily a surname of English or Chinese origin, rarely used as a given name. In English, it derives from Old English roots meaning "woodland" or "thicket". In Chinese contexts, Shaw is a romanization of the surname 邵 (Shao) or 萧 (Xiao) in Hong Kong, Taiwan, and among overseas Chinese communities especially in the United States.

== British surname ==
The name is of English and Scottish origin. In some cases, the surname is an Americanization of a similar-sounding Ashkenazic Jewish surname. In England and Scotland, the name is a topographic name for someone who lived by a copse or thicket. This name is derived from the Middle English schage, shage, schawe, and shawe, from the Old English sceaga meaning "dweller by the wood". The name can also be a habitational name derived from places named after these words. The English surname was established in Ireland during the 17th century. In Scotland, it relates to Clan Shaw.

=== People with the English given name "Shaw" ===
- Shaw Clifton (1945–2023), 18th General of The Salvation Army
- Walter Shaw Sparrow (1862–1940), British writer on art and architecture
- Shaw Taylor (1924–2015), British actor and TV presenter

=== People with the English surname "Shaw" ===
==== A–E ====
- A. G. L. Shaw (1916–2012), Australian historian
- A. R. Shaw (1922–2013), American educator and politician
- Aaron Shaw (representative) (1811–1887), U.S. Representative from Illinois
- Adam Shaw (journalist), British business journalist and presenter
- Adam Shaw (painter) (born 1957), American painter
- Aeneas Shaw (1740–1814), Canadian soldier and political figure
- Alfred Shaw (1842–1907), English cricketer
- Alice Marion Shaw (1890–?), American composer and pianist
- Alma Downes Shaw (1893–1969), English medical missionary doctor
- Amos F. Shaw (1839–1898), American politician
- Andrea Shaw (born 1983), American professional bodybuilder
- Andrew Shaw (ice hockey) (born 1991), NHL player (Montreal Canadiens)
- Anna Howard Shaw (1847–1919), American suffragette
- Anne Gillespie Shaw (1904–1982), Scottish engineer and businesswoman
- Archie Shaw (1922–1985), Scottish footballer
- Artie Shaw (1910–2004), American bandleader
- Ashley Shaw (cricketer) (born 1991), English cricketer
- Barbara Shaw (politician) (1942–2021), American politician
- Bernard Shaw (disambiguation), several people
- Bill Shaw (footballer, born 1886), Scottish footballer
- Bill Kennedy Shaw (1901–1979), British army captain, explorer
- Billy Shaw (born 1938), American football player
- Brewster H. Shaw (born 1945), retired U.S. Air Force colonel and former NASA astronaut
- Brian Shaw (basketball) (born 1966), American former basketball player
- Brian Shaw (strongman), American professional strongman and winner of World's Strongest Man
- Bryan Shaw (baseball) (born 1987), American baseball player
- Caroline Shaw (born 1982), American Pulitzer-Prize-winning composer
- Charles Thurstan Shaw (1914–2013), English archaeologist
- Clay Shaw (1913–1974), charged by Jim Garrison with conspiracy to murder John F. Kennedy
- Cliff Shaw, computer programmer
- Dan Shaw (1934–1992), Canadian football player
- Darci Shaw (born 2002), British actress
- David Shaw (disambiguation), several people
- Donald Douglas Shaw (1834–1859), New York assemblyman-elect
- Eddie Shaw (1937–2018), American blues saxophonist, arranger and bandleader
- Eddie Shaw (rock musician), American bass guitarist and founding member of the rock band The Monks
- Emma L. Shaw, American magazine editor
- Enrique Ernesto Shaw (1921–1962), Argentine marine and Roman Catholic businessman
- Esther Popel Shaw (1896–1958), poet of the Harlem Renaissance
- Eyre Massey Shaw, British Army and London Fireman.

==== F–O ====
- Fiona Shaw (born 1958), Irish actress who plays Petunia Dursley in the Harry Potter films
- Flora Madeline Shaw (1864–1927), Canadian nurse and nursing teacher
- Florence Shaw, English vocalist, lyricist, and artist
- Frank L. Shaw (1887–1958), former mayor of Los Angeles, California
- Frankie Shaw (born 1981), American actress
- Frederick H. Shaw (1864–1924), British citizen who had a prominent role in the creation of the Spanish Institute of Provision, 1908
- Sir Frederick Shaw, 3rd Baronet from 1869, (1799–1876), Irish Conservative MP in the United Kingdom Parliament
- Gary Shaw, several people
- George Bernard Shaw (1856–1950), Irish playwright
- George Shaw (disambiguation), several people
- Graham Shaw (footballer, born 1934) (1934–1998), former Sheffield United footballer
- Henry Shaw (philanthropist) (1800–1889), English-American philanthropist
- Henry Wheeler Shaw (1818–1895), "Josh Billings", American humorist
- Herman Shaw (1892–1950), English geophysicist and museum director
- Hester Shaw (midwife) (c. 1580 – 1660)
- Ian Shaw (born 1969), British actor
- Irwin Shaw (1913–1984), American playwright, screenwriter and author
- JR Shaw (1934–2020), Canadian businessman
- Jaedyn Shaw (born 2004), American professional football player
- Jane Shaw (born 1963) Anglican/Episcopalian priest (England and United States)
- Jane S. Shaw, American free-market environmentalist
- Joe Shaw (footballer, born 1928), former Sheffield United footballer
- John Shaw (disambiguation), several people
- Jonathan Shaw (disambiguation), several people
- Joyce Cutler–Shaw (1932–2018) American multidisciplinary artist
- Julia Shaw (cyclist) (born 1965), British physicist and racing cyclist
- Julia Shaw (psychologist) (born 1987), Canadian psychologist
- Julian Shaw (born 1985), New Zealand actor and filmmaker
- Kathy Shaw, American politician
- Kathryn Shaw, Canadian theatre actor and director
- Kathryn L. Shaw, economist
- Khadija Shaw (born 1997), aka Bunny Shaw, Jamaican professional football player
- L. M. Shaw (1848–1932), American banker and politician, Secretary of the Treasury
- Leander J. Shaw Jr. (1930–2015), American jurist
- Lemuel Shaw (1781–1861), American jurist
- Leslie Shaw, (born 1989), Peruvian model and singer
- Lindsey Shaw (born 1989), American actress
- Luke Shaw (born 1995), English footballer
- Malcolm Shaw (born 1947), English lawyer and academic
- Malcolm Shaw (rower) (1947–2014), Australian rower
- Malcolm Shaw (soccer) (born 1995), Canadian soccer player
- María Pía Shaw, Argentine journalist
- Marlena Shaw (born 1943), American singer
- Martin Shaw (born 1945), English actor
- Melville J. Shaw (1872–1927), Marine Corps Brevet Medal recipient
- Michael Shaw (disambiguation), multiple people
- Naman Shaw, Indian television actor
- Napier Shaw (1854–1945), British meteorologist
- Nellie Shaw Harnar (1905–1985), American historian and educator
- Norman Shaw (rugby league), rugby league footballer of the 1920s and 1930s
- Oscar Shaw (1887–1967), American actor and singer

==== P–Z ====
- Pamela Shaw, British neurologist
- Patrick Shaw (diplomat) (1913–1975), Australian diplomat
- Paula Shaw (1941–2025), American actress
- Pauline Agassiz Shaw (1841–1917), American philanthropist and social reformer
- Percy Shaw (1890–1976), British inventor of the cat's-eye reflector for roads
- Peter Shaw (disambiguation), several people
- Prithvi Shaw (born 1999), Indian cricketer
- Quincy Adams Shaw (1825–1908), American investor and industrialist
- Rebecca Shaw (disambiguation), several people
- Reta Shaw (1912–1982), American actress
- Richard G. Shaw (born 1943), first African American insurance commissioner for West Virginia
- Richard Norman Shaw (1831–1912), British architect
- Robert Shaw (disambiguation), several people
- Robin Shaw, American politician
- Robin Shaw (lawyer), British media lawyer
- Ronald Shaw (1920–1945), Royal Air Force corporal during World War II
- Ruth Shaw (disambiguation), several people
- Sally Shaw (born 1978), Australian cricketer
- Sam Shaw (disambiguation), several people
- Samantha Shaw (born 1957), American politician
- Samuel Shaw (disambiguation), several people
- Sandie Shaw (born 1947), British singer
- Sebastian Shaw (disambiguation), several people
- Sharon Shaw (1957–1971), American murder victim
- Simon Shaw (born 1973), English rugby union player
- Spencer Shaw (1916–2010), American librarian
- Stan Shaw (born 1952), American actor
- Stanford J. Shaw (1930–2006), American historian
- Steve Shaw (1965–1990), American actor
- Susan Shaw (disambiguation), several people
- Suzanne Shaw (born 1981), British actress and singer
- Sylvia Shaw Judson (1897–1978), also known as Sylvia Shaw Haskins, American sculptor and teacher
- T. E. Shaw, pseudonym of T. E. Lawrence ("Lawrence of Arabia")
- Terrey Shaw (1946–1997), Australian chess master
- Tevin Shaw (born 1997), Jamaican footballer
- Thomas Shaw (disambiguation), several people
- Todd Shaw, birth name of American rapper Too Short
- Tom Shaw (disambiguation), several people
- Tommy Shaw (born 1953) American musician (Styx)
- Toni Shaw (born 2003), British Paralympic swimmer
- Tony Shaw (Australian rules footballer) (born 1960), Australian rules footballer & media personality
- Travis Shaw (born 1990), American baseball player
- Tyler Shaw (born 1993), Canadian musician
- Vero Shaw (1854–1905), Indian-born English cricketer and Scottish clan chief
- Victoria Shaw (1935–1988), Australian actress
- Vinessa Shaw (born 1976), American Actress
- Watkins Shaw (1911–1996), British musicologist
- Wayne Shaw (disambiguation), several people
- Wilbur Shaw (1902–1954), American race car driver
- William Shaw (1937–2008), American politician
- William Arthur Shaw (1865–1943), English historian and archivist
- William James Shaw (1877–1939), American entrepreneur and philanthropist
- Willis R. Shaw (1860–1933), American politician
- Woody Shaw (1944–1989), American jazz trumpeter
- Zed Shaw, Canadian writer, software developer and musician

=== Fictional characters ===
- Benny Shaw, protagonist in two children's novels by Irish author Eoin Colfer
- Daniel Shaw, in the TV series Chuck
- Sebastian Shaw, a member of the Hellfire Club from Marvel Comics
- Sameen Shaw, in the TV series Person of Interest
- Hester Shaw, from Mortal Engines
- Deckard, Hattie, Magdalene, and Owen Shaw, from the Fast & Furious film series; see List of Fast & Furious characters
- Shaw, from the animated films Open Season and Open Season 4: Scared Silly
- Brandon Shaw, from the Alfred Hitchcock film Rope
- Reverend Shaw Moore, from the film Footloose
- Leah Shaw, from the TV series The Walking Dead
- Henry Shaw Sr and Henry Shaw Jr, from Fantastic Beasts
- Helena Shaw from Indiana Jones and the Dial of Destiny
- Mathias Shaw, an NPC in World of Warcraft
- Liz Shaw, a companion scientist in Doctor Who
- Sienna Shaw, heroine in Terrifier franchise

== Chinese surnames ==
Shaw is a romanization of Chinese surname "邵" with various Latinized spellings, including Shaw, Siaw, Siew, Shao, Shiu, Siu and Sho. The origin of the Shaw ("邵") surname traces back to the Zhou dynasty in ancient China. It is believed to have originated from the royal lines, specifically from the Duke of Shao (召公), a loyal subject of the King.

A notable example of the Chinese surname "Shaw" in modern history is the Shaw Brothers Studio (邵氏片場), established by the Shaw family. Founded in 1925 by Runje, Runme and Runde Shaw, and later joined by Run Run Shaw, the studio became one of Hong Kong's largest film production companies. It played a key role in popularizing the kung fu genre, producing iconic films like Come Drink with Me (1966), The One-Armed Swordsman (1967), and The 36th Chamber of Shaolin (1978).

Shaw is also a romanization of the Chinese surname "萧" (traditional Chinese: "蕭"). This usage is mostly seen in Taiwan and among overseas Chinese communities, predominantly in the United States. The connection between "Shaw" and "萧" is influenced by phonetic resemblance and is exemplified in the transliteration of notable figures such as Irish playwright George Bernard Shaw, rendered in Chinese as "萧伯纳", and English actor Robert Shaw. This reflects established conventions for translation between foreign and Chinese names, as outlined in resources like the English Name Translation Manual (英语姓名译名手册), ensuring that translated names resonate with native speakers and maintain phonetic consistency with the original pronunciation.

Historically, individuals bearing the surname "Shaw" (萧) who emigrated from China over the past 400 years predominantly originated from the provinces of Guangdong and Fujian. These migrations have contributed to the surname's presence in various overseas Chinese communities.

=== People with the Chinese surname "Shaw" ===
- Shaw Han-yi (邵漢儀), Taiwanese academic and research fellow at the National Chengchi University
- Luna Shaw (邵美君), Hong Kong stage actress and eight-time Hong Kong Drama Award winner
- Mei-Chi Shaw (蕭美琪), Taiwanese-American mathematician and Professor of Mathematics at the University of Notre Dame
- Runde Shaw (邵邨人, 1899–1973), pioneer Chinese filmmaker and co-founder of Tianyi Film Company
- Runje Shaw (邵仁傑, 1896–1975), eldest of the Shaw brothers and founder of the Tianyi Film Company in Shanghai
- Runme Shaw (邵仁枚, 1901–1985), pioneer filmmaker, chairman, and founder of the Shaw Organisation in Singapore
- Run Run Shaw (邵逸夫, 1907–2014), Hong Kong entertainment mogul, philanthropist, and founder of Shaw Brothers Studio and TVB

== See also ==
- Quintyne Schaw, makar mentioned in "Lament for the Makaris"
- Shaw (disambiguation)
- Clan Shaw of Tordarroch, Scottish clan
- Shao, Chinese family name also spelled as "Shaw"
- Shah (surname)
- Xiao (surname), Chinese family name also spelled as "Shaw"
- Zzxjoanw, fictitious dictionary word purportedly pronounced as "Shaw"
