= Cripps =

Cripps is a surname of English origin. It is an occupational surname for a pouch maker, derived from the Middle English word crippes "pouch". It may also be the metathesized form of Crisp. It may refer to:

== Surname ==
- Alan Cripps (born 1930), Australian cricketer
- Andrew Cripps (born 1981), Australian politician
- Annabelle Cripps (born 1968), British swimmer
- Arthur Shearly Cripps (1869–1952), Anglican priest and writer
- Brock Cripps (born 2009), Canadian ice hockey player
- Charles Cripps, 1st Baron Parmoor (1852–1941), British politician
- Colin Cripps (born 1961), Canadian musician
- Cripps–Appiah–Edun family, international dynasty
- Elizabeth Cripps, British political philosopher
- Godfrey Cripps (1865–1943), South African cricketer
- Harry Cripps (1941–1995), English footballer
- Hayden Cripps (born 1990), New Zealand rugby union player
- Humphrey Cripps (1915–2000), British businessman and philanthropist
- Dame Isobel Cripps (1891–1979), British overseas aid organizer
- Jamie Cripps (born 1992), Australian rules footballer
- Jason Cripps (born 1976), Australian rules footballer
- Jeff Cripps, musical producer
- John Cripps (1927–2022), British–Australian horticulturalist
- Sir John Cripps (1912–1993), British journalist
- John Marten Cripps (1780–1853), English traveller and antiquarian
- Joseph Cripps (1765–1847), English businessman, banker and politician
- Kofi Cripps (born 2003), English rugby union player
- Kyllie Cripps, Australian sociologist
- Leslie Cripps (born 1977), Canadian rugby union player
- Lionel Cripps (1863–1950), Rhodesian politician
- Lucy Cripps (born 2001), Australian cricketer
- Marian Cripps, Baroness Parmoor (1878–1952), British anti-war activist
- Mick Cripps (born 1962), Australian musician
- Patrick Cripps (born 1995), Australian rules footballer
- Peggy Cripps (1921–2006), English children's author
- Sarah Cripps (1822–1892), New Zealand postmistress and midwife
- Sharon Cripps (born 1977), Australian sprinter
- Shirley Cripps (born 1935), Canadian politician
- Sir Stafford Cripps (1899–1952), British politician
- Thomas Cripps (1840–1906), American soldier
- Thomas Cripps (1932–2018), American film historian
- William Cripps (1805–1848), British politician
- William Harrison Cripps (1850–1923), British surgeon
- William Joseph Cripps (1841–1903), British writer on antique silver plate
- Winsome Cripps (1931–1997), Australian sprinter

== Middle name ==
- Amy Cripps Vernon (1869–1956), English children's author
- Eleanor Cripps Kennedy (1825–1913), Canadian businesswoman
- Louise Cripps Samoiloff (1904–2001), British-American writer, historian and journalist

== See also ==
- Crips, American gang, founded in Los Angeles
