= Shigeaki =

- Gender: Male

Origin
- Origin: Japanese
- Meaning: Different meanings depending on the kanji used

Shigeaki (written: 茂章, 茂昭, 成章, 成亮, 成彬, 成彰 or 重昭) is a masculine Japanese given name. Notable people with the name include:

- Shigeaki Abe (阿部 成章; born 1947), Japanese basketball player
- Shigeaki Hattori (服部 茂章; 1963–2025), Japanese racing driver
- Shigeaki Ikeda (池田 成彬; 1867–1950), Japanese politician and businessman
- Shigeaki Kato (加藤 成亮; born 1987), Japanese idol and singer
- Shigeaki Mori (森 重昭; 1937–2026), Japanese historian
- Shigeaki Saegusa (三枝 成彰; born 1942), Japanese composer
- Shigeaki Uchino (内野 重昭; born 1931), Japanese modern pentathlete
- Shigeaki Ushijima (牛島 茂昭; born 1977), Japanese luger
- Shigeaki Yokota (横田 茂昭; born 1969), Japanese Go player
