= Thomas Shaw =

Thomas Shaw is the name of:

== Politicians ==
- Thomas Shaw, 1st Baron Craigmyle (1850–1937), Scottish politician and judge
- Thomas Shaw (Halifax MP) (1823–1893), English Liberal politician, MP for Halifax
- Tom Shaw (politician) (1872–1938), British trade unionist and Labour Party politician

== Military ==
- Thomas Shaw (Medal of Honor) (1846–1895), American Indian Wars soldier
- Thomas Shaw (World War I veteran) (1899–2002), last Irish veteran of World War Ir

== Music ==
- Thomas Shaw (blues musician) (1908–1977), American blues musician
- Thomas Shaw (composer) (1752–1830), English composer
- Thomas Shaw, Canadian music producer with Project 46
- Tommy Shaw (born 1953), American guitarist

== Others ==
- Thomas Shaw, 3rd Baron Craigmyle (1923–1998), philanthropist
- Thomas Shaw (divine and traveller) (1694–1751), born in Kendal, Westmoreland
- Thomas Shaw (Methodist minister) (1916–2001), English author and historian
- Thomas Claye Shaw (1841–1927), British physician and hospital administrator
- M. Thomas Shaw (1945–2014), American Episcopal bishop of Massachusetts

== See also ==
- Tom Shaw (disambiguation)
- Thomas Shore (disambiguation)
