= Adam Shaw =

Adam Shaw may refer to:

- Adam Shaw (journalist), British business journalist and presenter
- Adam Shaw (painter) (born 1957), American painter
- Adam Shaw, musician in Lost City Angels
