= Bernard Shaw (disambiguation) =

George Bernard Shaw (1856–1950) was an Irish playwright.

Bernard Shaw may also refer to:

- Bernard Shaw (footballer, born before 1900), English football player, 1890–1891
- Bernard Shaw (footballer, born 1945), English football player
- Bernard Shaw (journalist) (1940–2022), American journalist and CNN anchorman
- Bernard L. Shaw (1930–2020), English chemist
- Bernie Shaw (born 1956), Canadian singer for the band Uriah Heep
- LÉ George Bernard Shaw, ship of the Irish Naval Service
- The Bernard Shaw, pub in Dublin, Ireland (2006–2019)
