= Samantha Shaw (disambiguation) =

Samantha Shaw (born 1957) is an American politician.

Samantha Shaw may also refer to:

- Samantha Shaw, designer of 1999 wedding dress of Sophie Rhys-Jones
- Samantha Shaw, voice actress in Brady's Beasts (2005–2006)

== See also ==
- Sam Shaw (disambiguation)
