= William Harrison Cripps =

English surgeon (1850–1923)

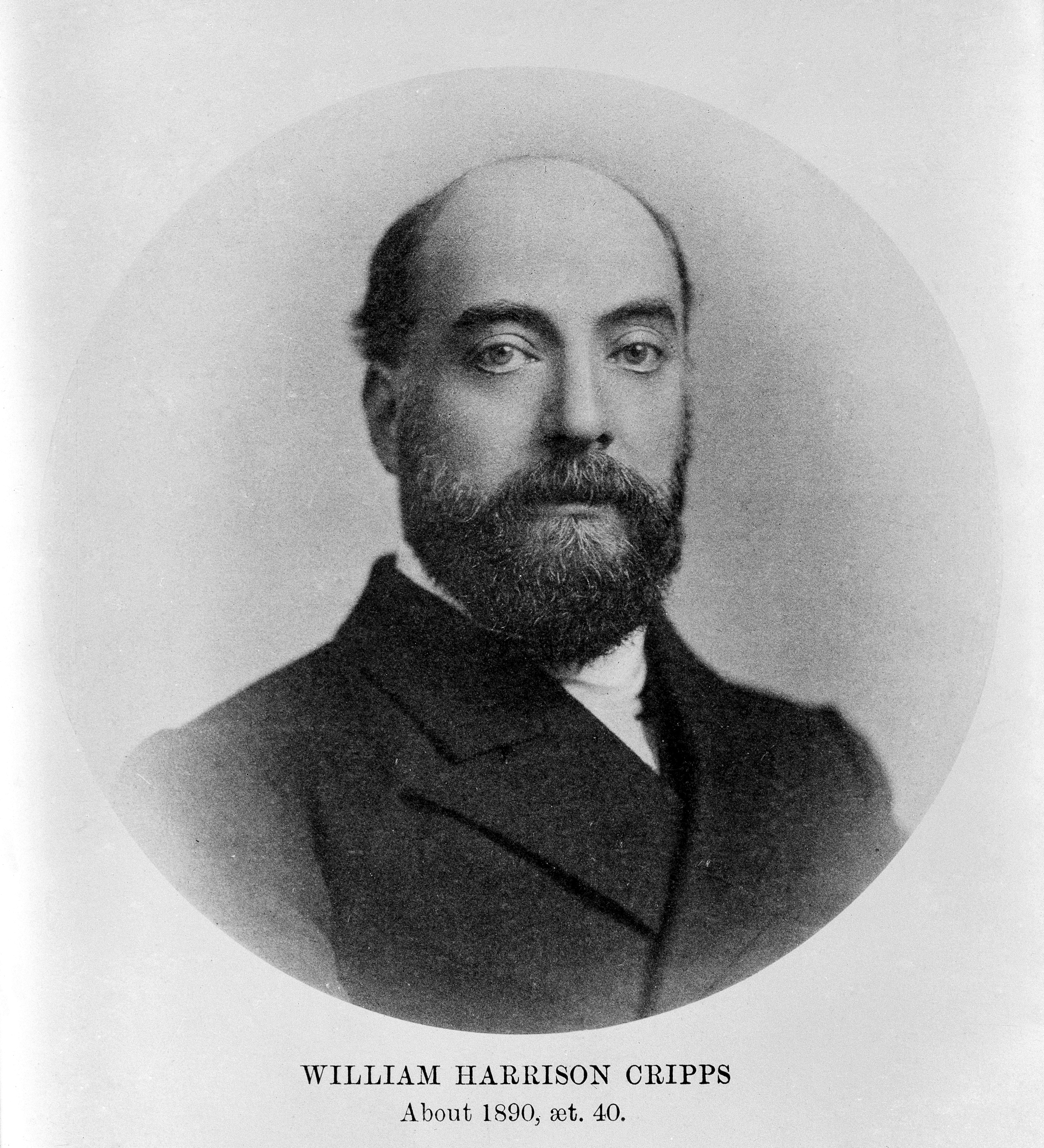
Portrait of William Harrison Cripps, about 1890

William Harrison Cripps (born West Ilsley, Berkshire, 15 January 1850; died London, 8 November 1923) was a prominent British surgeon. He was particularly noted for his expertise on cancer of the rectum.

== Early life ==
Cripps was the second son of Julia Lawrence and Henry William Cripps (1815-1899), QC, son of Joseph Cripps (1765-1847), a wealthy Cirencester banker and member of Parliament. Cripps' uncle William Cripps (1805-1848) and his younger brother Charles Cripps, 1st Baron Parmoor (1852-1941) also served in Parliament. Cripps had scarlet fever as a child and was educated at home by a tutor due to ill health. His mother's uncle Sir William Lawrence, 1st Baronet (1783-1867) was a prominent surgeon, and Cripps entered St Bartholomew's Hospital, where Lawrence had operated, for training about 1868–9. Cripps became a Member of the Royal College of Surgeons of England in 1872 and a Fellow in 1875.

== Surgical career ==
Cripps spent most of his career at St. Bartholomew's Hospital. He was at first House Surgeon to Thomas Smith, then an assistant demonstrator of anatomy at the medical school. In 1876 he won the Jacksonian Prize of the Royal College of Surgeons for an essay titled "The Treatment of Cancer of the Rectum, particularly as regards the possibility of Curing or Relieving the Patient by Excision of the Affected Part". In 1879 he was appointed surgical registrar. In 1882 he was elected Assistant Surgeon. In 1892 he also took on the position of surgeon to the gynaecological wards, working with Sir Francis Champneys. From 1880 to 1890 he was also Surgeon to the Great Northern Hospital and the Royal Free Hospital, although most of his work continued to be at St. Bartholomew's.

In 1902 Cripps was elected Surgeon of St. Bartolomew's and served in that position until retiring in 1909.

== Later life ==
Upon his retirement in 1909 he was made Consulting Surgeon and a governor of the hospital. He served as a Member until 1920 and was vice president in 1918 and 1919. He served on the finance committee where his financial acumen was useful in transferring the examination hall from the Embankment to Queen Square. Personally he was quite successful in business, becoming an early investor in the Metropolitan Electric Supply Company and later its chairman. When a large portion of the company was purchased by the Marylebone Borough Council, Cripps profited greatly.

== Accomplishments ==
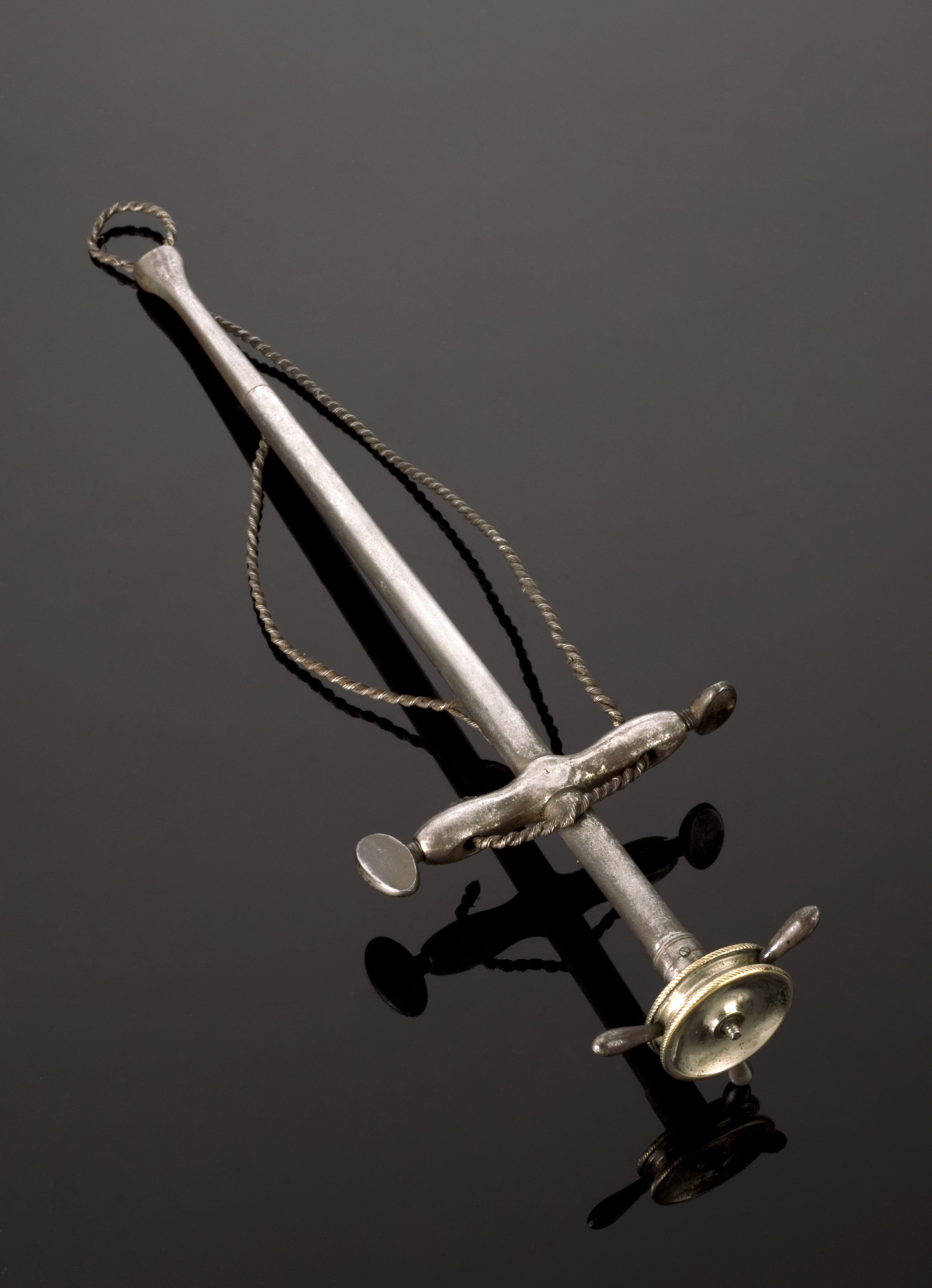
Cripps-type tongue écraseur

Cripps was well known as teacher and demonstrator; he taught "with dogmatism, enlivened by caustic wit and shrewd thrusts". He was an early advocate of inguinal colostomy. He suggested in 1882 that having multiple rectal polyps could be familial. Working with Thomas Claye Shaw, he tried to relieve paralysis and mental symptoms in patients by relieving fluid pressure on the brain. He was responsible for several surgical inventions - an écraseur for removing sections of the lower rectum (later adapted by oral surgeons for use on the tongue) and a rubber rectal dilator. He published a number of works on rectal and abdominal surgery. A section of his Carcinoma of the Rectum was reprinted in 1986 as part of a series of "Classic Articles of Colonic and Rectal Surgery" in the journal Diseases of the Colon & Rectum.

In a contribution appended to Cripps' obituary in the British Medical Journal, Francis Champneys said that "Cripps was a born surgeon" and "As regards operative work, he was rapid without being hurried; he had beautiful "hands," firm and gentle; he was absolutely concentrated on his work, never flurried, always unruffled and prompt in the face of a mishap."

== Publications ==
- Cancer Of The Rectum, Its Pathology, Diagnosis, And Treatment - 1880
- On Diseases of the Rectum and Anus - 1884
- The Passage of Air and Faeces from the Urethra - 1888
- Ovariotomy and Abdominal Surgery - 1898

== Marriage and family ==
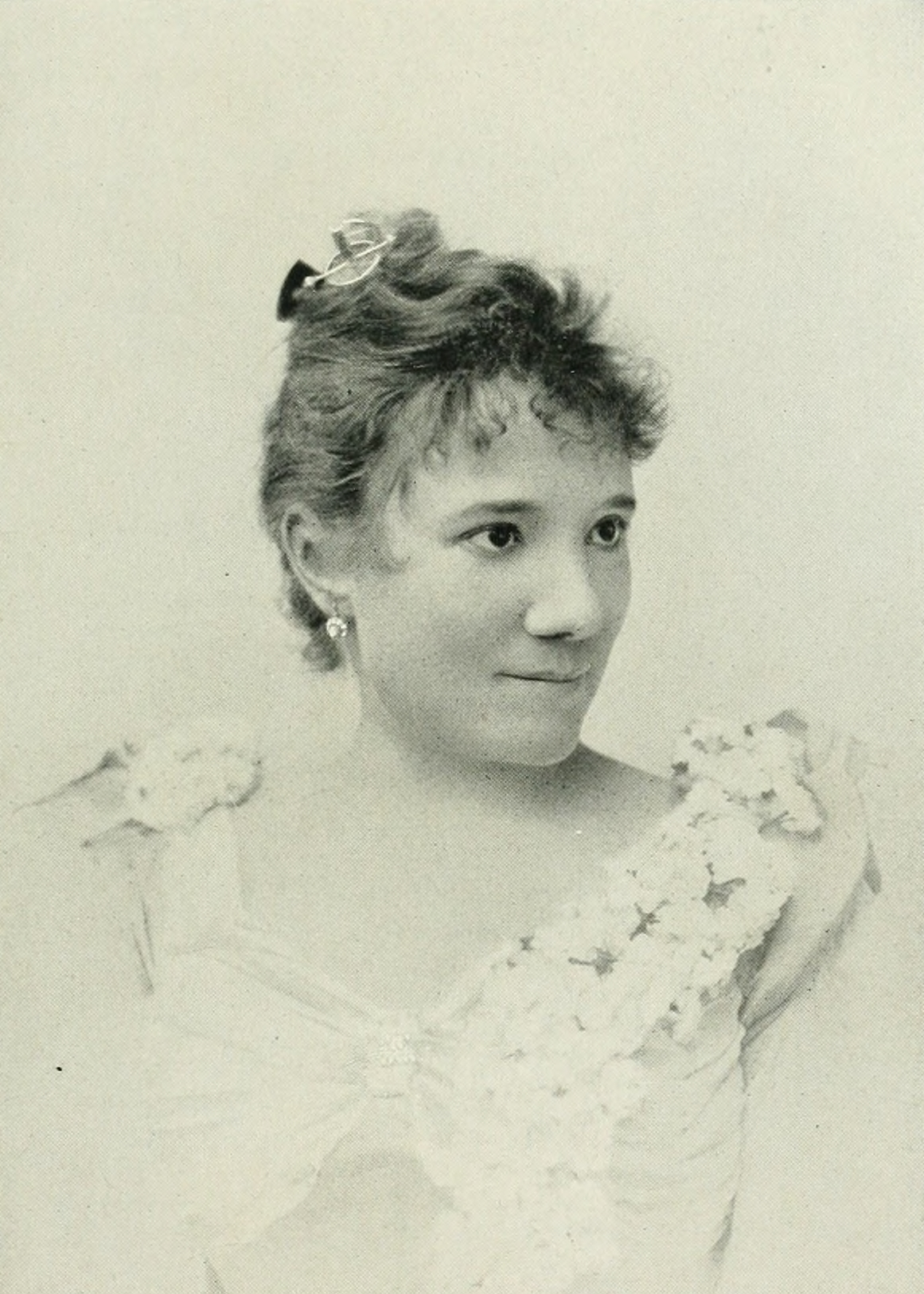
Giulia Ravogli, Cripps' second wife

Cripps's first marriage was to Blanche Potter (1851-1905), daughter of businessman Richard Potter of Standish, Gloucestershire and granddaughter of Liberal MP Richard Potter. Blanche had eight sisters; of them, Theresa Potter married William's brother Charles, Lord Parmoor. Another sister, Beatrice, was a notable economist and socialist, as was her husband, Sidney Webb, 1st Baron Passfield.

William and Blanche had three sons and two daughters. His second marriage, in 1907, was to Giulia Ravogli, an Italian prima donna.
