= Thomas Shore =

Thomas Shore may refer to:

- Thomas Shore (writer) (1793–1863), British writers
- Thomas Shore (MP) for Derby (UK Parliament constituency)
- Thomas William Shore (1840–1905), English geologist and antiquarian

== See also ==
- Thomas Shaw (disambiguation)
