= Pete Shaw =

Pete Shaw may refer to:

- Pete Shaw (author) (born 1966), British author, broadcaster, programmer and theatrical producer
- Pete Shaw (American football) (born 1954), American football player

== See also ==
- Peter Shaw (disambiguation)
