= Michael Shaw =

Michael Shaw or Mike Shaw may refer to:

- Michael Shaw, Baron Shaw of Northstead (1920–2021), British politician
- Michael Shaw (American football) (born 1989), American football player
- Michael Shaw (Maine politician), American politician from Maine
- Mike Shaw (1957–2010), professional wrestler
- Mike Shaw (Family Affairs), fictional character
- Mike Shaw (Alabama politician), member of the Alabama House of Representatives
- Mike Shaw (heart operation patient), early open-heart surgery patient of C. Walton Lillehei
- Mike Shaw (footballer) (1901–1976), English footballer
- Sir Hugh Shaw-Stewart, 8th Baronet (Michael Hugh Shaw-Stewart, 1854–1942), Scottish politician
- Michael H. Shaw (1924–2019), American politician
- Michael James Shaw (born 1986), American actor
- Michael Shaw (field hockey) (born 1991), Welsh field hockey player
