= Shigeaki Mori =

Japanese historian (1937–2026)

- 森 重昭
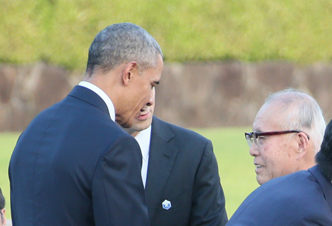
- Mori (at right) in 2016
- Born: March 29, 1937; Hiroshima, Japan
- Died: March 14, 2026 (aged 88); Hiroshima, Japan
- Education: Chuo University
- Occupation: Historian
- Notable work: Hiroshima POWs

Shigeaki Mori (森 重昭, Mori Shigeaki; March 29, 1937 – March 14, 2026) was a Japanese historian from Hiroshima and a survivor of its atomic bombing. He is known for his research into Allied prisoners of war who died during the air raids on Japan. His hug with U.S. President Barack Obama during the president's visit to Hiroshima in 2016 was reported in multiple countries.

== Early life and World War II ==
Mori was born in Koi, Hiroshima on March 29, 1937, to Toshio and Toshiko Mori, an engineer and homemaker, respectively. He was a young boy in Hiroshima during World War II, and was eight years old when the city was destroyed with an atomic bomb on August 6, 1945. At the time Hiroshima was bombed, he was walking on a bridge and was thrown into a river. He saw a large number of badly wounded people who he was unable to help.

After the war, Mori attended Chuo University, studying economics. He subsequently was employed at a brokerage, and as a salesman for a company that manufactured pianos.

== Postwar research ==
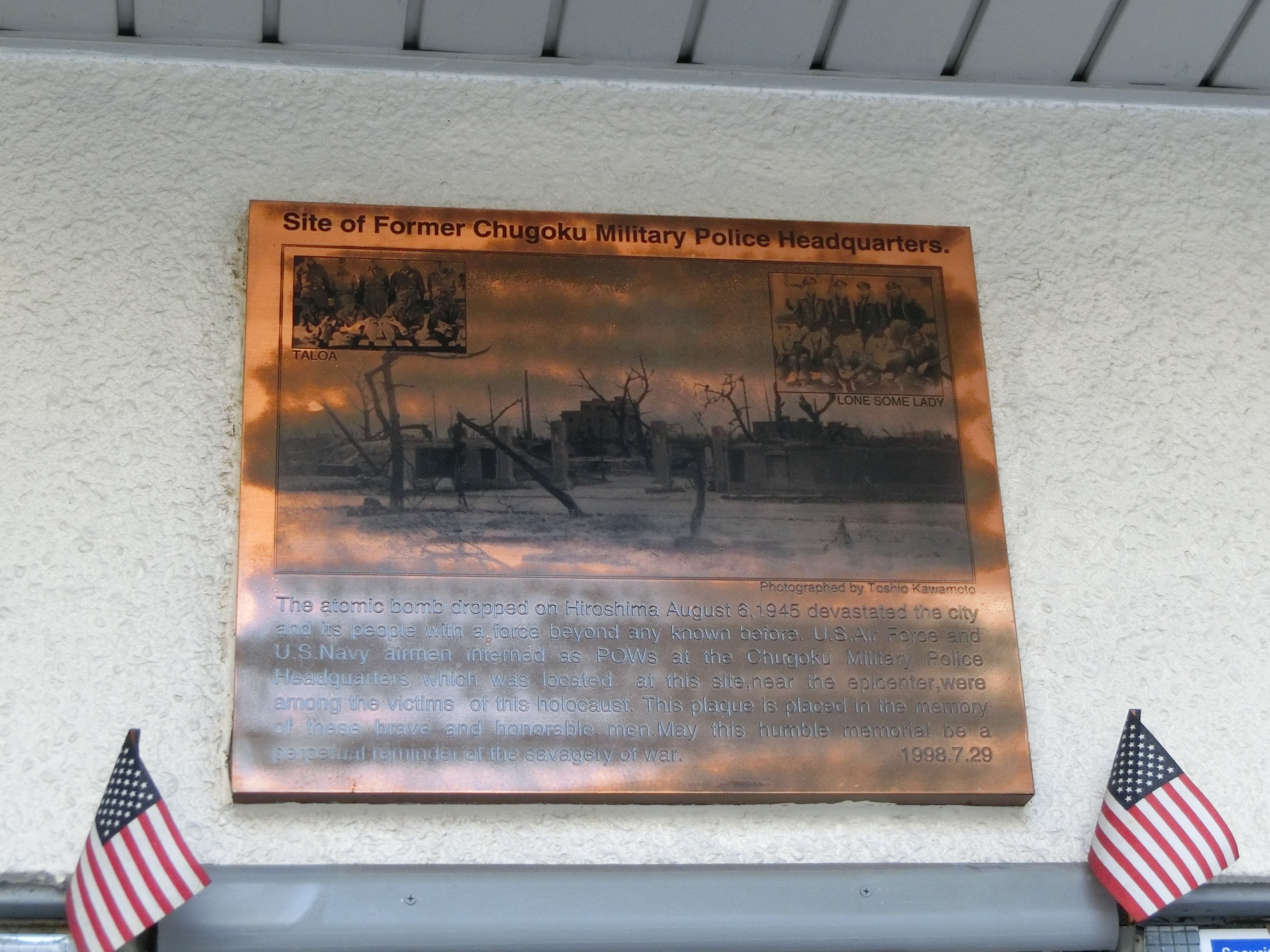
Plaque to commemorate American soldiers killed by the atomic bomb

An atomic bomb survivor, Mori spent over 30 years researching and obtaining official recognition for United States aviators who were killed while being held as POWs in the Chugoku Military Police Headquarters, approximately 400m from the explosion's hypocenter in Hiroshima. He authored a book on the subject titled A Secret History of U.S. Servicemembers Who Died in the Atomic Bomb. It has been translated to a web-based version in English. A documentary film, Paper Lanterns, tells the story of Mori's work over several decades to learn and share the fate of the Americans who were killed by the blast, fire, and radiation by the atomic bombing of Hiroshima.

For decades, Mori tried to locate relatives of airmen from one of the aircraft shot down during an air raid on Kure, from the B-24J bomber Taloa. The wreckage from the downed aircraft that had been hidden by local farmers was handed over to Mori with the hope of being returned to surviving family members for closure. Mori also was involved in recognizing other foreign victims of the bombing of Nagasaki, including British armed forces member Ronald Francis Shaw.

Mori met and was embraced by U.S. President Barack Obama during Obama's May 2016 visit to Hiroshima. In 2018, Mori traveled to the U.S. for the first time, visiting the Headquarters of the United Nations where Paper Lanterns was being screened.

== Death ==
Mori died in Hiroshima on March 14, 2026, at the age of 88.
