= Sam Shaw =

Sam Shaw may refer to:

== Sports ==
- Sam Shaw (baseball) (1863–1947), American professional baseball player
- Sam Shaw (wrestler) (born 1984), American professional wrestler
- Sam Shaw (footballer) (born 1991), Australian rules footballer
- Sam Shaw, (born 1992), New Zealand cyclist, represented New Zealand at the 2010 Summer Youth Olympics#Cycling

== Others ==
- Sam Shaw (photographer) (1912–1999), American photographer and film producer
- Sam Shaw (sound editor) (1946–2024), American sound editor
- Sam Shaw (politician) (born 1957), American politician

== See also ==
- Samuel Shaw (disambiguation)
- Samantha Shaw (disambiguation)
- Sam Shore (disambiguation)
