= Peter Shaw =

Peter Shaw may refer to:

- Peter Shaw (bowls) (born 1954), New Zealand lawn bowler
- Peter Shaw (footballer) (born 1956), English footballer active during the 1980s
- Peter Shaw (physician) (1694–1763), English physician and medical author
- Peter Shaw (producer, born 1918) (1918–2003), British actor and film producer, husband of actress Angela Lansbury
- Peter Shaw (producer, born 1942) (born 1942), British film producer
- Peter Stapleton Shaw (1888–1953), British Member of Parliament for Liverpool Wavertree, 1935–1945

== See also ==
- Pete Shaw (disambiguation)
