= Kyllie Cripps =

Australian sociologist

- Occupation: Sociologist
- Awards: Fellow of the Australian Academy of the Humanities (2023)

Academic background
- Education: University of South Australia; Monash University
- Thesis: Enough Family Fighting: Indigenous Community Responses to Addressing Family Violence in Australia and the United States (2005)

Academic work
- Discipline: Sociology
- Sub-discipline: Aboriginal domestic violence
- Institutions: UNSW Faculty of Law and Justice; Monash University

Kyllie Cripps FAHA is an Australian Aboriginal Tasmanian sociologist who specialises in Aboriginal domestic violence. Originally a professor at the UNSW Faculty of Law and Justice, she is currently Professor at the Monash Indigenous Studies Centre at Monash University.

== Biography ==
Cripps was educated at the University of South Australia, where she received her BA in Aboriginal Affairs Administration in 1998 and BA with first-class honours in Aboriginal Studies in 1999, and at Monash University, where she received her PhD in arts in 2005. Her doctoral dissertation was titled Enough Family Fighting: Indigenous Community Responses to Addressing Family Violence in Australia and the United States, and was featured on the 22 September 2007 episode of ABC Radio Sydney's Speaking Out.

After spending some time working at the Victorian Health Promotion Foundation's Koori Health Research and Community Development Unit, Cripps started working at the UNSW Faculty of Law and Justice as a senior lecturer in 2010. She received her master's degree in criminology from University of Sydney in 2020. In 2022, she was promoted to associate professor, and in 2023, she moved to Monash University, where she became professor and the director of the Monash Indigenous Studies Centre.

As an academic, Cripps specialises in Aboriginal domestic violence, being known as a leading expert in the field. She uses intersectionality in her research, which otherwise has included identifying causes and solutions to domestic violence. Her work also includes creating safe spaces, supporting local communities and organisations, and teaching the next generation. While at UNSW, she served as co-convenor of their Gendered Violence Research Network. She was elected Fellow of the Australian Academy of the Humanities in 2023.

Cripps is an Aboriginal Tasmanian. She is married to John.
