= Tom Shaw =

Tom Shaw may refer to:

- Tom Shaw (American football) (Thomas L. Shaw, 1928–2017), college football quarterback for Stanford University
- Tom Shaw (bishop) (1945–2014), American Episcopal bishop of Massachusetts
- Tom Shaw (footballer) (Thomas William Shaw, born 1986), English footballer currently playing for Chester F.C
- Tom Shaw (golfer) (Thomas G. Shaw, born 1938), American golfer
- Tom Shaw (politician) (Thomas Shaw, 1872–1938), British Labour politician in the 1920s and 1930s
- Tom Shaw (producer), founder & executive producer of Digital Theatre
- Tom W. Shaw (born 1961), American politician from Iowa

== See also ==
- Thomas Shaw (disambiguation)
