= The Bernard Shaw =

Former pub in Dublin, Ireland

- The front of The Bernard Shaw, showing the entrance to the traditional front bar, December 2016
- Interactive map of The Bernard Shaw
- Former names: Bambrick's
- Address: 11-12 South Richmond Street, Dublin 2, D02HX76
- Location: Portobello, Dublin
- Coordinates: 53°19′54″N 6°15′52″W
- Elevation: 19 metres
- Operator: Bodytonic
- Type: Pub

Construction
- Built: 1895
- Opened: 2006
- Closed: October 2019

The Bernard Shaw was a pub in Portobello, Dublin, which operated from 2006 to October 2019. Housed in a late 19th century protected structure, the pub previously known as Bambrick's was taken over in 2006 by Bodytonic who refurbished, reopened, and renamed it after writer George Bernard Shaw, who was born on nearby Synge Street. It became a popular venue, associated with alternative bohemian subcultures, and incorporated a basement venue, food yard, and beer garden in addition to a traditional style pub.

After the adjoining buildings had gradually been demolished or left fall into dereliction, the bar was refused planning permission to retain the beer garden in May 2019, and four months later announced the bar would close entirely in October of that year. The closure was polarising, with commentators lamenting a great loss to Dublin cultural life, while others celebrated it as eliminating a source of anti-social behaviour and an obstacle to regeneration and progress. The operators of the pub opened a pub of the same name in Glasnevin shortly after.

== History ==
=== Background ===
The pub was included in the Record of Protected Structures maintained by Dublin City Council. The National Inventory of Architectural Heritage dates the building to 1895, while a 2019 article in The Irish Times dates it to 1859, and a 2019 San Francisco Chronicle article reported claims of there having been a pub on the site since the 12th century. The 1862 Thom's Directory notes a spirit distiller at the site. A 2017 appraisal of the building by the National Built Heritage Service described it thusly:

This public house features prominently in the streetscape. While many of the surrounding structures have been demolished, this building retains much of its architectural character internally and externally, as indicated by salient features such as the sash windows, timber frontage, and interior timber panelling.

The pub ran as 'Bambrick's' before Bodytonic refurbished and reopened it as The Bernard Shaw in 2006. The name of the pub referred to writer George Bernard Shaw, who was born on nearby Synge Street. They received planning permission in 2008 for a smoking area beside the pub, which they converted into the beer garden three years later.

=== Interior ===
The Bernard Shaw was an old-fashioned pub with mahogany panels and a brass rail at the front entrance on South Richmond Street, that opened onto both a small 60-person venue space in the basement and an outdoor beer garden at the back; to the side of the pub was "Eatyard", an open area featuring food vendors and seating.

=== External appearance and artwork ===
The pub was known for exterior, which featured street art and murals. Irish political leader Daniel O'Connell and the band 12 Sundays shown depicted on its northern face here in December 2017.

A mural of Savita Halappanavar, by artist Aches, adorned the wall adjacent to the pub's facade during the campaign around the 2018 referendum on abortion. It became a shrine to her memory in May 2018 when mourners left over a thousand messages at its base. The notes were collected and archived by the Dublin City Library and Archive (DCLA) in collaboration with the Digital Repository of Ireland. After the pub's closure, a barrier over the former Eatyard entrance was painted by ESTR with a mural for Concern Worldwide with a QR code linking to a recording of a poem.

Christopher Jones of Dublin Live considered it to not look like much from the outside, but said it did have a charming and easygoing look, noting that it was a "reflection of many of the people that hung out there: scruffy but interesting".

The appearance of the pub (pictured here in September 2013), combining dilapidated elements of peeling paint and crumbling plaster with bright and varied street art, gave it a distinctive look.

Journalist Una Mullally of The Irish Times commented that it was "symbolic too because it revelled in its dilapidation", calling it a compelling visual environment"

== Activities and offerings ==
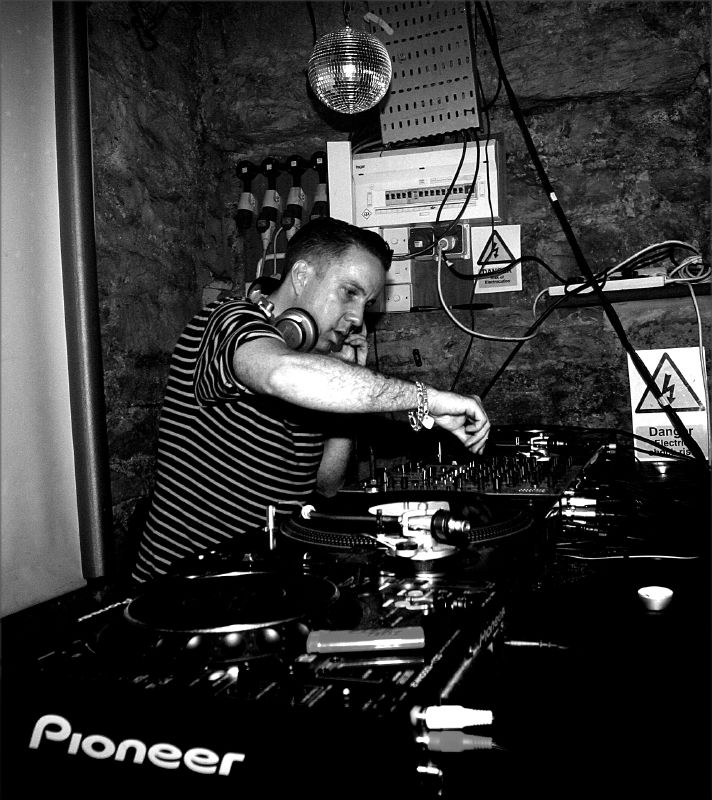
DJ Andrew Weatherall (pictured in 2006) was one of many artists to perform in the basement space

Acts who performed in the basement venue include Mr Saturday Night, Andrew Weatherall, Acid Granny, Optimo, Niall Byrne, Blue Niall, and Motor City Drum Ensemble.

The pub was also a centre of political activity, hosting events for Dublin Pride, International Women’s Day, and the Repeal the 8th abortion rights referendum campaign.

=== Recognition ===
The beer garden was named among the city's five best in a 2017 roundup in The Irish Independent, and its pool table was named the city's finest by The Daily Edge in 2015. Following public complaints that drinkers along the popular hangout spot of the nearby Grand Canal were causing public nuisance by leaving litter behind during the summer of 2018, the pub launched a publicity stunt whereby punters were offered branded bin bags, which once returned filled with rubbish from the canal, would be exchanged for free pints.

The entrance to the Eatyard open food area, pictured in December 2017.

In 2018, the pub stocked Pabst Blue Ribbon, and beers from Bodytonic's Rascals Brewing, Five Lamps Brewery, Whiplash Brewery, and White Hag Brewery, while food vendors in the Eatyard included Kinara Kitchen, Box Burgers, Just Wing-It, Vish Shop and Mr Doughnut. In the beer garden, a large blue bus dispensed pizza. A 2018 review of the food offerings by celebrity chef Darina Allen, which referred to the pub as "hipster central", concluded "the vendors in Eatyard vary in quality a little, but overall standards are high with the added bonus of getting to hang out with people far prettier and cooler than you."

== Planning issues and closure ==
=== 2019 planning permission refusal ===
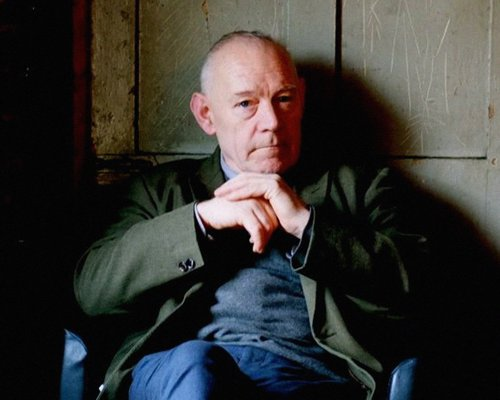
Independent councillor Mannix Flynn (pictured 2016), who supported the refusal to extend planning permission for the beer garden to operate

The operators applied for permission to continue to run the beer garden in May 2019, invoking "brewing unease and scepticism [at how] once-lauded cultural institutions are being replaced by hotels and short-term accommodation" in reference to the recent closure and demolition of Tivoli Theatre and Andrews Lane Theatre. Local residents had objected due to the noise generated by pubgoers in the space.

An Bord Pleanála's inspector's report described it as "clearly a vibrant enterprise with its own unique character within an area notable for the extent of dereliction", and recommended requesting further submissions from the applicants detailing greater evidence of noise mitigation efforts. An Bord Pleanála instead refused the application outright, on the basis that it would hinder the “emerging pattern of development in the vicinity” given that the surrounding buildings were being redeveloped.

The decision was celebrated by independent city councillor Mannix Flynn, who concluded "A bunch of cool hipsters can think it’s an amazing place. But the level of anti-social behaviour that goes on is incredible, and the noise is appalling." A petition opposing the decision as "drastic and harmful to Dublin’s development as an attractive and vibrant cultural hub" attracted 15,000 signatures.

=== Closure ===
The operators Bodytonic announced in September 2019 that The Bernard Shaw would be closing the following month, through a statement by company executive Trevor O'Shea:

We’ve tried really hard over the last few months to renew the lease, stay on longer, or buy the place. A lot of things didn’t go our way over the last 12 months either, but it’s out of our hands now unfortunately.

In an article called "Mystery at The Bernard Shaw", The Phoenix observed with suspicion that the exact reason for the closure was not made clear by Bodytonic's statement. A report in The Irish Times noted that the pub had been a highly successful business, earning €622,416 profit in 2018.

At the time of its closure The Bernard Shaw was described as "much loved" (Dublin Live, The Guardian), "iconic" (The Journal, Newstalk), "legendary" (The Irish Mirror), and "a staple of the city’s creative communities" (San Francisco Chronicle).

=== Reaction ===
==== Dublin City Council ====
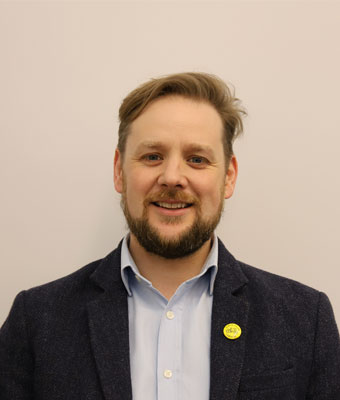
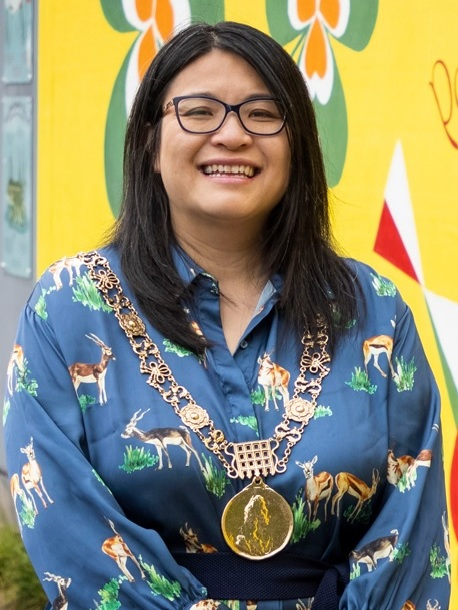
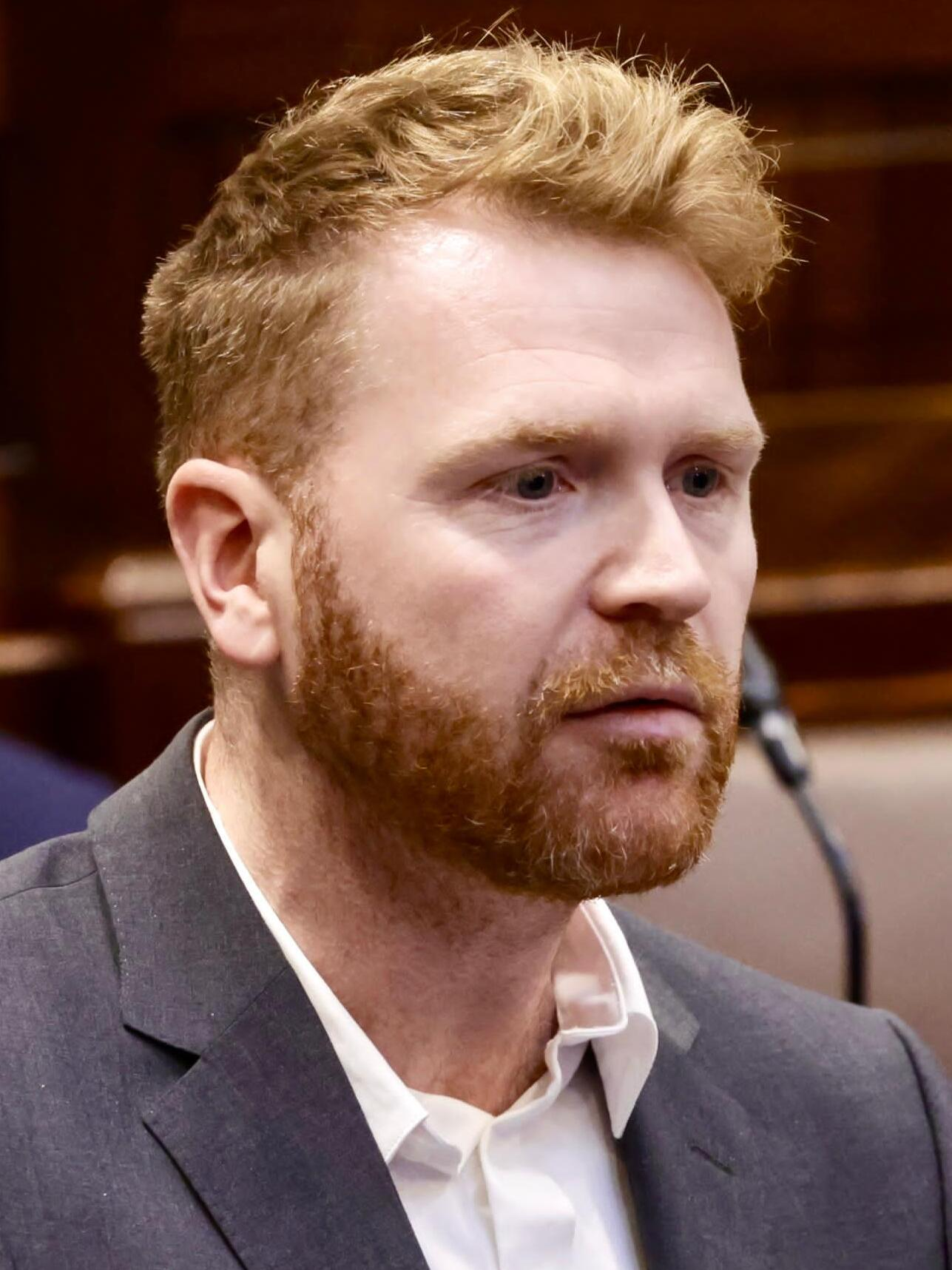
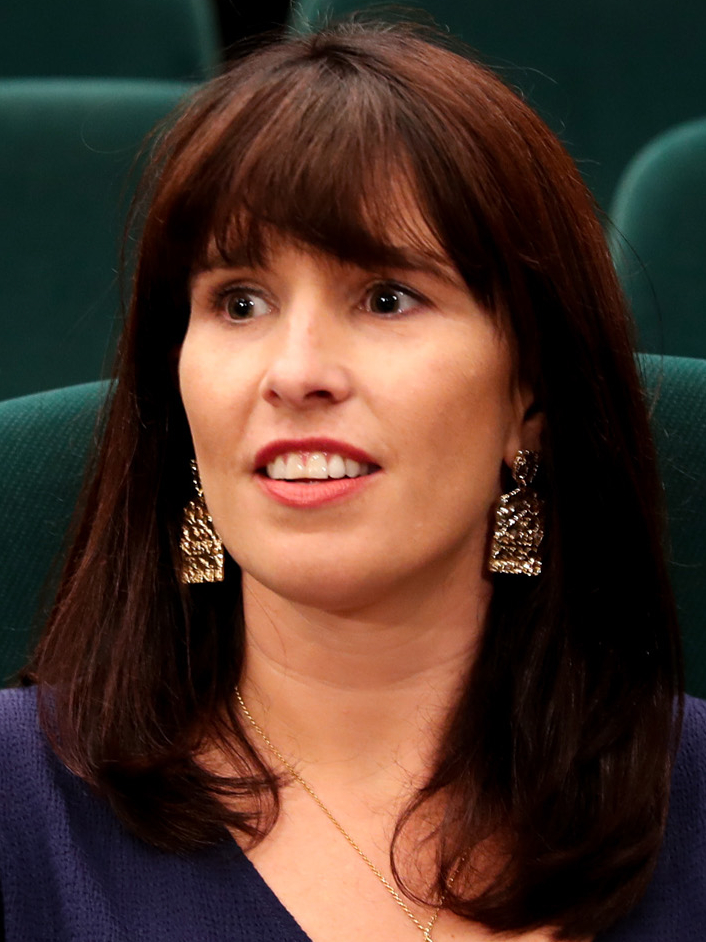
Patrick Costello, Hazel Chu, Gary Gannon, and Rebecca Moynihan, who were among the 12 members of Dublin City Council who demanded to meet with the Lord Mayor of Dublin to object to the closure.

A cross party group of Dublin City Councillors cited the "great anger" of the public in response to the closure to demand a special meeting with the Lord Mayor. The group was composed of Claire Byrne, Patrick Costello, Hazel Chu, Donna Cooney, Michael Pidgeon, Janet Horner, Sophie Nicollaud, Caroline Conroy and Lawrence Hemmings from the Green Party, Rebecca Moynihan and Kevin Donoghue from the Labour Party, and Gary Gannon of the Social Democrats.

Their statement called for the Dublin City Development Plan to be updated to curtail the spread of hotels and protect cultural venues, to appoint a night mayor, and for action to be taken by the government ministers for Tourism, Culture and Justice. Byrne commented: "It’s not only a great pub and venue, but its closure is a symbol of Dublin’s cultural crisis. Unique spaces which build Dublin’s culture and character are being replaced with homogenous hotels and chain restaurants."

Within weeks, motions were passed by the council to appoint a night mayor, promote street art, change the development plan to inhibit hotel development, and to require audits of any commercial development over 5,000 metres to ensure no cultural spaces would be lost.

A spokesperson for Dublin City Council remarked;"Recent office, hotel and student accommodation construction in the city has invariably been on long-standing, unsightly vacant sites. They have not resulted in the wholesale displacement of socio and cultural uses as stated in some media [...] Rather, they have contributed to employment and vitality in the city and are part of the rich fabric and character of the city as it evolves."

==== Musicians ====
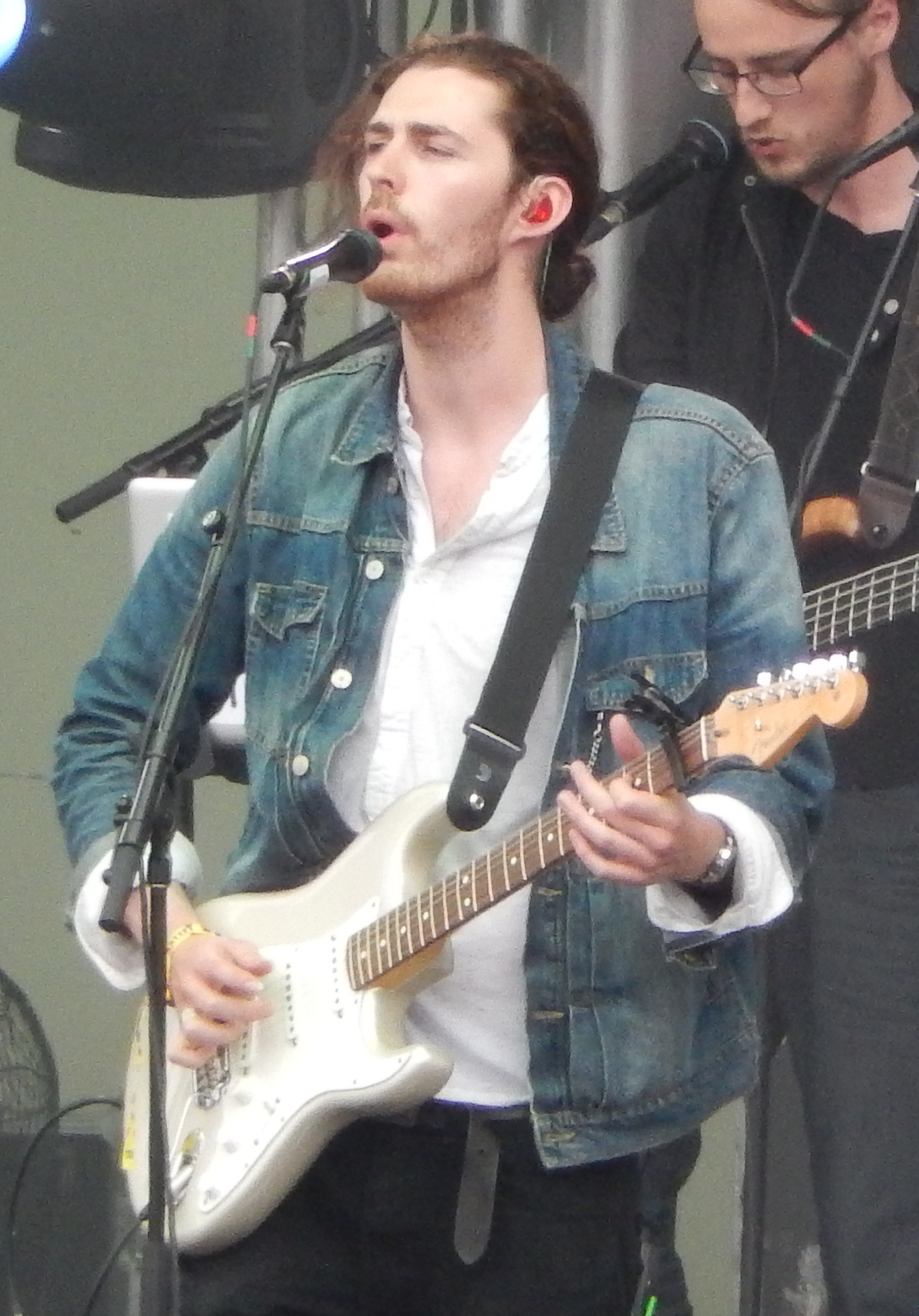
Musician Hozier (pictured in 2014) was one of many to express dismay at the pub's closure

Musician Hozier lamented "I’m sorry to read this. What is most special and unique about Dublin are Dubliners themselves, and spaces like this where culture and community is fostered & grows. Without interesting places like these the city loses its heartbeat."

Dublin post-punk band Fontaines D.C. and musician and podcaster Blindboy Boatclub also reacted despondently to the news, citing fond memories of the pub. Musician and Today FM radio presenter Kelly-Anne Byrne condemned the Irish government in the wake of the closure, and added "If Leo Varadkar turns up at any of my gigs trying to look trendy, I might jst drop kick him 2 the head".

DJ and chair of the Give Us the Night campaign for greater government support for Irish nightlife Sunil Sharpe was quoted in The Times as calling The Bernard Shaw "probably the most important cultural and social hub in Dublin". Sharpe criticised the proliferation of hotels, offices for tech companies, and chain pubs, and argued that their prioritisation over cultural spaces would result in a bland and inhospitable city that no-one would want to be in.

==== Columnists and cultural commentators ====
Peter McGoran of Hot Press called it a "seismic loss [that] will no doubt lead to people pushing even hard[er] for a change to Dublin's careless treatment of its social spaces". DJ Christopher Jones writing for Dublin Live remarked that the redevelopment surrounding the building lent an air of inevitability to the closure, saying "this part of Dublin has turned into something of a hostile environment for a bohemian drinking spot" and concluded "there’s no doubt that The Bernard Shaw will leave a colossal hole in Portobello’s nightlife, and in its many regulars’ lives."

Shane Morgan in Gay Community News remarked "To live in Dublin at the minute is to watch a play-by-play of a city’s slow death, and to be all the while conscious of the fact that the going rate for tickets to the funeral will be out of our price range" and wrote that the pub's closure should be seized upon as the start of a fight for the future of the city. This sentiment was echoed by The Irish Times columnist Una Mullally, a prominent commentator on Dublin culture and gentrification, who too issued a call to action:

Trying to carve out a life where one’s environment reflects and enables creativity, culture, curiosity, a sense of discovery, vibrancy, and a hint of transgression, feels so difficult in Dublin right now. The walls are closing in, like an Indiana Jones booby-trap, the cranes circling, the student accommodation and hotels and offices flying up like time-lapse videos. Do we emancipate ourselves by leaving or giving up, or do we emancipate the city by building an alliance that says: no more, these are our streets and our spots.

What’s it going to be?

The public uproar, and Mullally's article in particular, drew pushback from columnist Dónal Lynch, who in an opinion column for The Irish Independent entitled "Spare us the hysteria over the closure of the Bernard Shaw", contended that the local residents' success in having the beer garden closed was an example of "the people taking on The Man and winning, not the other way around". Lynch further accused devotees of the pub of confusing a bar with a community, and of "getting pissed in a place and calling it a cultural event".

== Successor ==
The new Bodytonic bar of the same name opened in Glasnevin in November 2019

A month after the closure of The Bernard Shaw, Bodytonic opened a new pub of the same name in the former Porterhouse Whitworth building, at Cross Guns Bridge in Glasnevin on the north side of the city. A post they made to Instagram to announce the new opening, showing youths in hoodies and tracksuit bottoms with a machete, a baseball bat and making obscene gestures, captioned "Northsiders before the Bernard Shaw moved", contrasted with an "After" image showing people in hipster outfits drinking over an electronic keyboard. The post drew immediate criticism on social media, calling out Bodytonic for being petty bourgeois, and classist capitalists profiting from gentrification of the area. The post was swiftly removed and replaced with an apology.

== Post-closure redevelopment ==
In October 2023, Dublin City Council rejected a request for planning permission for a proposed redevelopment of the former The Bernard Shaw site, citing a lack of residential units in the scheme and the level of intervention proposed to the protected structure: "The protected structure will be subsumed and diminished by the proposed development. It is considered that it would overwhelm the protected structure and would cause serious injury to its amenity, architectural significance, legibility, special architectural character and setting."

In October 2024, an appeal to overturn the decision was approved by An Bord Pleanála. Although the report from An Bord Pleanála's inspector recommended upholding the rejection on the grounds of compromising the protected structure, An Bord Pleanála again decided against their inspector's recommendation, saying the substance of the appeal adequately addressed the cited concerns. The approved proposal entailed an eight storey mixed use development incorporating office space, hospitality, retail and an arts and cultural space.

== See also ==
- The Cobblestone, a pub on Dublin's northside whose threatened replacement by a hotel in 2021 sparked major protest
