= Eleanor Cripps Kennedy =

Canadian businesswoman (1825–1913)

- Born: November 2, 1825; London, UK
- Died: October 4, 1913 (aged 87); Virden, Manitoba, Canada
- Spouse: William Kennedy (m. 1859–1890)

Eleanor Eliza Cripps Kennedy (1825–1913) was a Canadian businesswoman, musician, artist, and author.

== Biographic information ==
Born in London, England, on 2 November 1825, Kennedy emigrated to the Red River Settlement (now Manitoba) with her husband William Kennedy in 1861 to establish a mission school for the Church of England. Though they tried to return to England in 1862, they were trapped by a Sioux uprising in Minnesota that prevented them from leaving the province by their intended route. After returning to Red River, the couple imported the second piano to appear in the settlement, on which Kennedy performed. They built the first frame house in Manitoba in 1866, which they called "Maple Grove". Kennedy organized a clothing club during the "severe grasshopper plagues of the later 1860s". Known locally as "The Duchess", she was heavily involved in efforts to open a hospital in the settlement.

The Kennedys were next caught up in the Red River Rebellion in 1869 – Eleanor was said to have personally delivered a letter to Louis Riel asking him to stop the fighting. "Distressing" gossip arose that she had petitioned for the life of Riel and demanded the death of Thomas Scott. She appealed to Robert Machray to address the source of the rumours, her parish priest, from whom she refused to take communion; she threatened to leave the church if this was not done, and Machray had the priest apologize.

After the entrance of the province of Manitoba into Canadian Confederation, Kennedy established a millinery business to import clothing and foodstuffs, which provided the family with financial support while William was stricken with rheumatism. While it was initially successful, "William began stocking inferior products, accepting land deeds and scrip in payment", resulting in its eventual failure. William died in January 1890. Kennedy moved to Virden, Manitoba, where she painted nature works, played organ at the local church, and wrote poetry. She died on 4 October 1913 and was buried in St. Andrews, Manitoba.

== Family ==
In 1859 she married William Kennedy. They had a son, William Theodore Ballentine, and a daughter, Mary Louisa.
