= Mike Shaw (footballer) =

English footballer (1901–1976)

Personal information
- Full name: Michael Victor Shaw
- Date of birth: 3 February 1901
- Place of birth: Stockport, England
- Date of death: 1976 (aged 74–75)
- Position: Winger

Senior career*
Years	Team	Apps	(Gls)
1924–1925	Cheshire Regiment		
1925–1926	Barnsley	5	(1)
1926–1929	Crewe Alexandra	104	(31)
1930	Chester		
Total		109	(32)
- * Club domestic league appearances and goals

Michael Victor Shaw 3 February 1901 – 1976) was an English footballer who played in the Football League for Barnsley and Crewe Alexandra.
