= Écraseur =

Surgical instrument

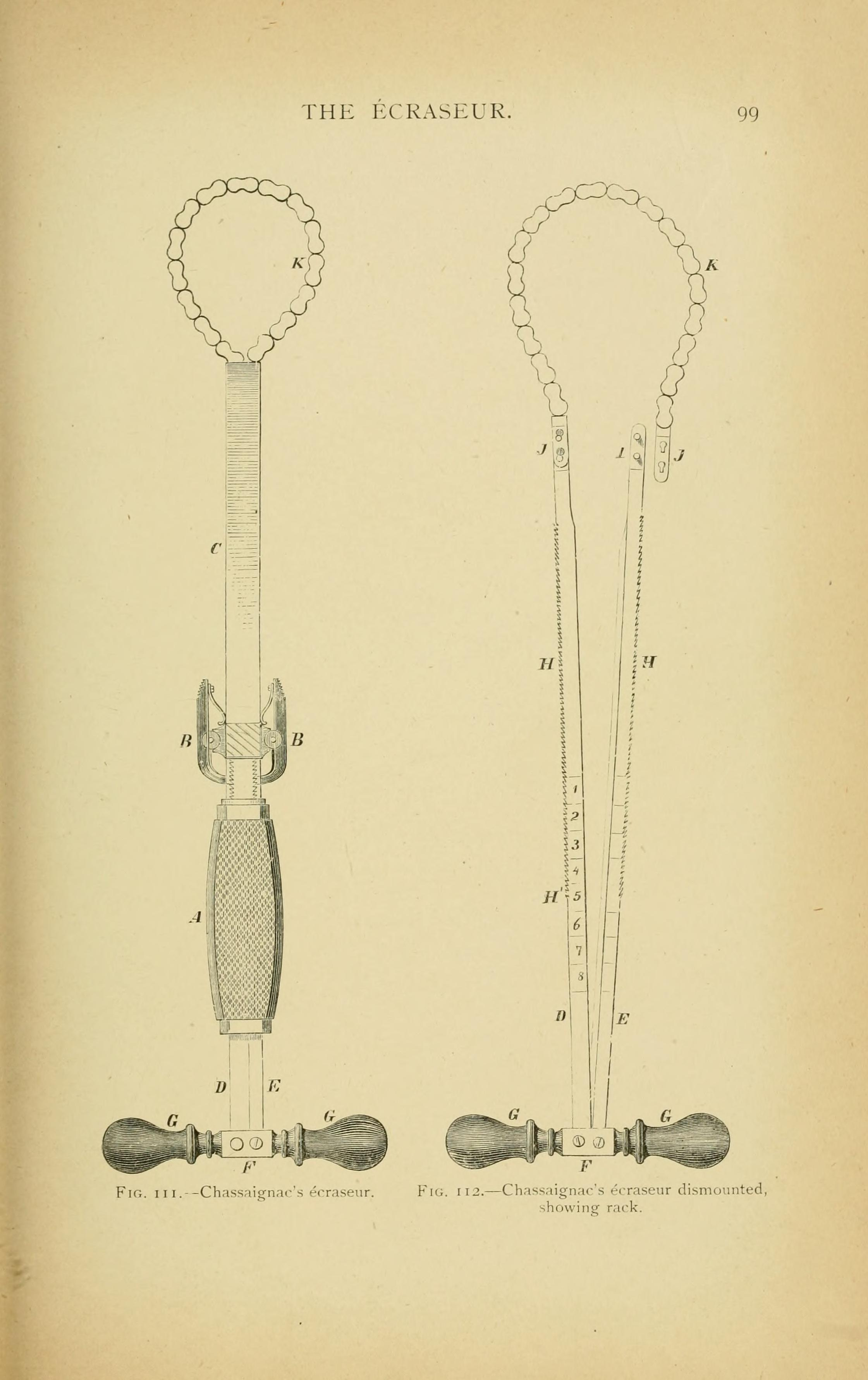
Chassaignac's écraseur, a veterinary surgical instrument

An écraseur is a surgical instrument containing a chain or wire loop that is used to encircle and sever a projecting mass of tissue (as the testicles of a horse or a pedicled tumor) by gradual tightening of the chain or loop.

== See also ==
- Instruments used in general surgery

== Sources ==
- http://www.merriam-webster.com/medical/%C3%A9craseur
