= Samuel Shaw =

Samuel Shaw may refer to:

== Sports ==
- Dexter Lumis (born 1984), American professional wrestler also known as Samuel Shaw
- Samuel Shaw (bowls player) from Lawn bowls at the 1996 Summer Paralympics
- Samuel Shaw (tennis), played in 1883 U.S. National Championships – Men's Doubles

== Others ==
- Samuel Shaw (consul) (1754–1794), first American consul to China at the consulate in Canton
- Samuel Shaw (minister) (1635–1696), English nonconformist minister
- Samuel Shaw (naval officer), first American whistleblower
- Samuel Shaw (New Zealand) (1819–?), New Zealand labour reformer
- Samuel Shaw (police officer) from Kingston Police
- Samuel Shaw (politician) (1768–1827), American politician
- Samuel Shaw (slave trader) (1718-1781), operating from the Port of Liverpool
- Samuel Shaw, commander of Amelia (1816 ship)
- Samuel R. Shaw (1911–1989), United States Marine Corps general
- Samuel Shaw Residence on National Register of Historic Places listings in Summit County, Ohio

== See also ==
- Sam Shaw (disambiguation)
- Samuel Shore (disambiguation)
