= Ruth Shaw =

Ruth Shaw may refer to:

- Ruth Shaw Wylie (1916–1989), United States-born composer and music educator
- Ruth Faison Shaw (1888–1969), American artist and educator
- Ruth Shaw (politician) (born 1920s), British politician
- Ruth Geyer Shaw (born 1953), evolutionary biologist and former editor of the monthly scientific journal Evolution
- Ruth G. Shaw (born 1948), former CEO of Duke Energy
- Ruth Shaw (Prisoner), character from Australian TV series Prisoner, played by Mary Murphy
- Ruth Shaw, character from the 1949 Western Down Dakota Way, played by Dale Evans

== See also ==
- Ruth L. Saw (1901–1986), British philosopher and aestheticist
