= Elizabeth Cripps =

British political philosopher

Elizabeth Blanche Cripps is a British political philosopher. She is a senior lecturer in Political Theory at the University of Edinburgh. Her research addresses environmental philosophy, including questions around climate change, population and parenting, environmental ethics, environmental politics, and environmental justice.

== Career ==
From 1995–9, Cripps studied at St John's, University of Oxford, initially reading Maths and philosophy, and then Politics, philosophy, and Economics. She subsequently worked as a journalist, both freelance and for the Financial Times Group. She returned to academia in 2003, undertaking an MPhil (2003–05) and PhD (2005–08) in philosophy at University College London (UCL). Her PhD thesis was entitled Individuals, Society and the World: A Defence of Collective Environmental Duties. During her studies, she taught variously at UCL, West London College, and Heythrop College, as well as continuing to work as a freelance journalist.

Upon completing her PhD, Cripps moved to the Department of Politics and International Relations at the University of Edinburgh, initially (2008–09) as a fixed term lecturer and then (2009–12) as a British Academy Postdoctoral Fellow. Her project was entitled Collective Action, Collective Responsibility and a New Environmental Ethics. After this, she remained at Edinburgh as a Lecturer in Political Theory. Her first book, the academic monograph Climate Change and the Moral Agent: Individual Duties in an Interdependent World, was published by Oxford University Press in 2013.

Cripps was promoted to Senior Lecturer in 2016. In 2022, she published What Climate Justice Means and Why We Should Care with Bloomsbury. The following year, she published Parenting on Earth: A Philosopher's Guide to Doing Right by Your Kids – and Everyone Else with MIT Press.

== Selected publications ==
- Cripps, Elizabeth (2013). Climate Change and the Moral Agent: Individual Duties in an Interdependent World. Oxford University Press.
- Cripps, Elizabeth (2022). What Climate Justice Means and Why We Should Care. Bloomsbury.
- Cripps, Elizabeth (2023). Parenting on Earth: A Philosopher's Guide to Doing Right by Your Kids – and Everyone Else. MIT Press.
