= Gary Shaw =

Gary Shaw may refer to:

- Gary Shaw (Australian footballer) (born 1959), Australian rules footballer for Collingwood and the Brisbane Bears
- Gary Shaw (footballer, born 1961) (1961–2024), English football striker for Aston Villa
- Gary Shaw (Irish footballer) (born 1992), Irish footballer for Bray Wanderers
