= Susan Shaw (disambiguation) =

Susan Shaw (1929–1978) was an English actress.

Susan or Suzanne Shaw may also refer to:

- Susan Shaw (conservationist) (1943–2022), American scientist and writer
- Susan Shaw (publisher) (1932–2020), British publisher
- Susan Shaw Devesa (born 1944), American cancer epidemiologist
- Siu Yam-yam (born 1950), or Susan Shaw, Hong Kong actress
- Suzanne Shaw (born 1981), English actress and singer
