= Thomas Shaw (Methodist minister) =

Cornish bard, historian, and Methodist minister

Thomas Shaw was a Cornish bard and historian, born in Manchester in 1916 who spent thirty- four years in Cornwall as a Methodist minister. He is best known as the author of many books on Cornish Methodism. In 1961 he was made a bard of the Cornish Gorsedd taking the bardic name 'Ystoryer Methysyeth' in recognition of his studies in Cornish Methodism.

== Works ==
- Menhinick Family: the History and Genealogy of a Cornish family (1950)
- The Bible Christians 1815-1907 (1961)
- Methodism in Probus, 1781-1961 (1961)
- Methodism in the Camelford and Wadebridge Circuit (1963)
- A History of Cornish Methodism (1967)
- Foolish Dick and his Chapel: The Story of Porthtowan Methodism 1796-1967
- Thomas Treffrey Senior (1969)
- The Pastoral Crook- Religion in Cornwall in the Mid- nineteenth century (1969)
- A Methodist Guide to Cornwall (updated by Colin Short, 2005)

== Death ==
Shaw died in 2001, aged 85.
