= Thomas Claye Shaw =

British physician (1841–1927)

Thomas Claye Shaw, FRCP (1841 – 14 January 1927), often published as T. Claye Shaw, was a British physician and hospital administrator with a special interest in mental illness.

== Life ==
Thomas Claye Shaw was born in 1841 at Stockport, the son of a chemist. He studied at King's College, London, as Senior Warneford Scholar, and graduated from the University of London with a bachelor of arts (BA) degree in 1860; he became a Member of the Royal College of Surgeons and Licentiate of the Society of Apothecaries (MRCS, LSA) four years later. He took the degree of bachelor of medicine (MB) in 1866 and a year later became a doctor of medicine (MD), winning a gold medal. He was interested in mental illness and was appointed to a junior position at Colney Hatch Asylum and then as medical superintendent at a temporary hospital in Hampstead, then the Metropolitan Asylum at Leavesden, and then at London County Council's Asylum at Banstead. He advised the LCC on the new asylum at Claybury and recommended Robert Armstrong-Jones to be its first director.

Claye Shaw was also appointed a lecturer in psychological medicine at St Bartholomew's Hospital and also in clinical immunity at St Luke's Hospital. With surgeon Harrison Cripps of St Bartholomew's he tried to relieve paralysis and mental symptoms in patients by relieving fluid pressure on the brain. He was involved in the foundation of the After-Care Association, president of the Society for the Study of Inebriety and was associated with the Psychological Section of the British Medical Association (Manchester secretary, 1877; London vice-president, 1895; and Exeter president, 1897). He elected a fellow of the Royal College of Physicians in 1880. A popular lecturer, he published articles in various medical journals (often hospital reports) and entries in medical dictionaries. His Ex-Cathedra Essays on Insanity (1904) was an original contribution to understanding mental illness. "Outspoken" and "dogmatic", he advocated the establishment of medical clinics in general hospitals. He espoused misogynistic views in his critique of the 'modern woman', telling an audience in 1913 that her pursuit of independence would "mar the beauty of her face, change her nature, and alienate male sympathy". When World War I broke out, he criticised the mentality of the German elite in a polemical attack.

Outside of work, he was an active sportsman, a keen musician and an amateur actor. In 1877, he married Hannah Gratix, a daughter of Isaac Ridgway of Leavesden; they had two daughters. Later in life he lived at Cheltenham and died on 14 January 1927.
