= Sarah Cripps =

New Zealand landlady (c1822–1892)

- Born: Sarah Rigelsford c. 1822; London, England
- Died: 1892; Wellington, New Zealand
- Known for: Running accommodation house, store and post office at Whareama, Wairarapa, New Zealand; also community midwife for the area

Sarah Ann Cripps (c. 1822 – 8 June 1892) was a New Zealand accommodation-house keeper, shopkeeper, postmistress and midwife.

== Biography ==
Sarah Ann (née Rigelsford) Cripps, born in London, England, established a dressmaking business and married Isaac Cripps, a police officer, in 1844.

After participating in Charles Enderby's failed whaling settlement at Hardwicke on the Auckland Islands from 1849, Isaac and Sarah moved to the Wellington Region with their four young children and lived in Island Bay. In 1857 the Cripps bought 40 acres of land at Whareama on the route to the Hawke's Bay Region and established and ran an accommodation house there called "Sevenoaks". The homestead (pictured) was built in wattle and daub with toi-toi and raupo thatching.

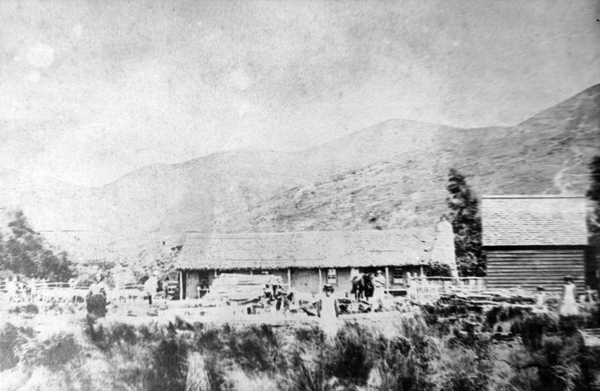
Cripps family homestead, known as Sevenoaks, also used as post office and store, Whareama, New Zealand, c. 1860s

Cripps was known in Wairarapa for running a guest house, a small shop and the local mail service. She also served as a mid-wife, which was important for the community as the nearest doctor was based in Masterton, some 20 miles (32 km) away. She home-schooled her ten children: Mary Ann, Caroline, Emily, Harriet, Margaret, Ellen and Sarah (twins), Isaac, Thomas and George.

Cripps later moved to Wellington, where she lived on Adelaide Road in Newtown. She died in Wellington on 8 June 1892 after a long illness and is buried at Karori Cemetery. After her death, she was called "the best loved woman from Wellington to Ahuriri", the latter being the Māori name for Napier. She was survived by her husband, who died in 1904 at their daughter's place in Upper Plain near Masterton.

Cripps is covered in volume 1 of Miriam Macgregor's book Petticoat Pioneers.
