= Shao =

- Pronunciation: Shào (Pinyin); Siu^{6} (Jyutping); Seu (Pha̍k-fa-sṳ); Sau^{4} (Guangdong); Siêu (Min Dong); Siō (Hokkien, Pe̍h-ōe-jī); Siao^{6} / siou^{6} / siên^{7} (Teochew, Peng'im); Zau^{3} (Wu)
- Language: Chinese, Vietnamese, Korean

Origin
- Language: Old Chinese
- Derivation: Duke of Shao (召公)

Other names
- Variant forms: So (Korean); Thiệu, Thiều (Vietnamese)

Shao (Chinese: 邵; pinyin: Shào; HKG Romanisation: Shiu; Gwoyeu Romatzyh: Shaw) is a common Chinese family name. It is the 86th most populous family name in China. It corresponds to last name So in Korean; Thiệu or Thiều in Vietnamese; Zau in Wu Chinese/Shanghainese and Siu, Chow, or Sho in other Chinese romanisations. The origin of the family name Shao is thought to have come from the royal lines of the Zhou dynasty in ancient China. The King's loyal subject Duke of Shao (召公), was thought to have originated the Shao lines. The Hundred Family Surnames also mentions a much rarer surname with the same pronunciation but with a different tone: Sháo (韶).

== Notable people ==
- Shao Yong (邵雍; 1011–1077), philosopher, cosmologist, poet and historian who greatly influenced the development of Neo-Confucianism in China during the Song dynasty
- Empress Xiaohui (Ming Dynasty) (d. 1522), concubine of the Chenghua Emperor and grandmother of the Jiajing Emperor
- Shao Mi (邵弥; c. 1592–1642), Chinese landscape painter, calligrapher, and poet during the Ming dynasty
- Shao Jiayi (邵佳一), Chinese soccer player
- Shao Ning (born 1982), Chinese judoka
- Shao Xunmei a.k.a. Zau Sinmay, Chinese poet and publisher
- Shao Tong (1994–2014), Chinese student murdered in Iowa
- The Shaw brothers:
  - Runje Shaw (1896–1975)
  - Runde Shaw (1899–1973)
  - Runme Shaw (1901–1985)
  - Run Run Shaw (1907–2014)
- Shao Yunhuan (邵云环), Chinese journalist killed in the 1999 United States bombing of the Chinese embassy in Belgrade
- Ivy Shao (Chinese: 邵雨薇; pinyin: Shào Yǔ Wēi) is a Taiwanese actress

== Fictional Characters ==
- Shao Kahn Emperor of Outworld in the Mortal Kombat universe.
