= Samuel Shore =

Samuel Shore (or Sam or Sammy Shore) may refer to:

== People ==
- Hamby Shore (Samuel Hamilton Shore, 1886– 1918), Canadian ice hockey player
- Samuel Shore (banker) (1738–1828), High Sheriff of Derbyshire for 1761
- Samuel Shore (of Norton Hall) (1761–1836), owner of Norton Hall, High Sheriff of Derbyshire for 1832
- Sam Shore (tennis), U.S. Pro Tennis Championships draws, 1927–1945
- Sammy Shore, founder of The Comedy Store
- Sam Shore (screenwriter) on List of Go Girls episodes
- Samuel E. Shore, New Zealand screenwriter, writer of 2023 drama series After the Party

== Fictional characters ==
- Samuel Shore, character in Stingray (TV series)

== See also ==
- Samuel Shaw (disambiguation)
