= Wayne Shaw =

Wayne Shaw may refer to:

- Wayne Shaw (footballer) (born 1972), English goalkeeper
- Wayne Shaw (linebacker) (born 1939), former Saskatchewan Roughriders player
- Wayne Shaw (politician), American politician
- Wayne Shaw (safety) (born 1974), Canadian Football League player
