= Ronald Shaw =

Royal Air Force airman

Ronald Francis Shaw (28 November 1920 – 9 August 1945) was a Royal Air Force corporal who was captured by the Japanese during World War II, and was killed by the atomic bombing of Nagasaki while in Japanese captivity.

Shaw was from Edmonton, London, and served as an engine fitter in the Royal Air Force. He initially served in Egypt before being transferred to the Far East. His plane took off from Java to fly to Sumatra; however, it turned back and then crashed roughly 16 miles south-east from Lahat, where he was assisted by Chinese civilians.

Shaw was later seen by the No. 84 Squadron R.A.F, who noted he was severely injured, and aboard a boat heading to either India or Colombo. Shaw sent a note to the Officer-in-charge which stated "plane got out of control and crashed". His boat did not reach the destination, and Shaw was declared missing in the Far East.

Shaw was captured in 1942 in Batavia (now Jakarta) and taken to Japan as a prisoner of war.

In 1944 he was sent by sea on a Japanese hell ship; however, the ship was sunk. Shaw survived and was taken to Kyushu, and then in August 1945 worked in a Nagasaki shipyard.

On 9 August 1945, the US atomic bombing of Nagasaki took place, and the bomb is believed to have exploded close to the area where Shaw was being held prisoner. He was killed when a wall fell on him.

Shaw was the first prisoner of war to be listed at the Nagasaki National Peace Memorial Hall for the Atomic Bomb Victims and the second non-Japanese (the first being a Chinese civilian).
