= Adam Shaw (painter) =

American painter

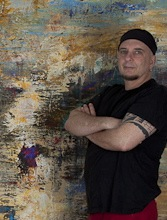
- Shaw in 2011
- Born: 1957 (age 68–69); New York City

Adam Shaw (born 1957) is an American painter. Shaw's work has been widely exhibited in the United States and is featured in hundreds of private and corporate collections throughout the United States, Canada, Mexico, and Europe, including Bank of America's, Gap's, Marriot's and eBay's.

== Life and work ==
Adam Shaw was born in New York City. He has been painting his entire life and began working with oils in the mid-1970s. He was educated in the Renaissance tradition, receiving a BA in Classics, with a minor in Russian and Italian. In 1979 and 1980 he lived in Italy, in Florence and Urbino, studying art history. In 1981 he moved to San Francisco to pursue a master's degree in Poetics. Following that he became a physician and was in private practice for 14 years. He has taught workshops and lectured at numerous institutions, including Palmer College and the College of Marin. He has published a number of his own poems and has translated poetry from Latin, Russian, and Italian.

His work combines abstract tradition with a sensibility to the present moment that is the result of an affinity for Eastern spiritual teachings. His paintings have lush surfaces built up over the course of 3 to 5 years or more, and a luminous tension that evokes a deep emotional response in the viewer.

=== Process ===
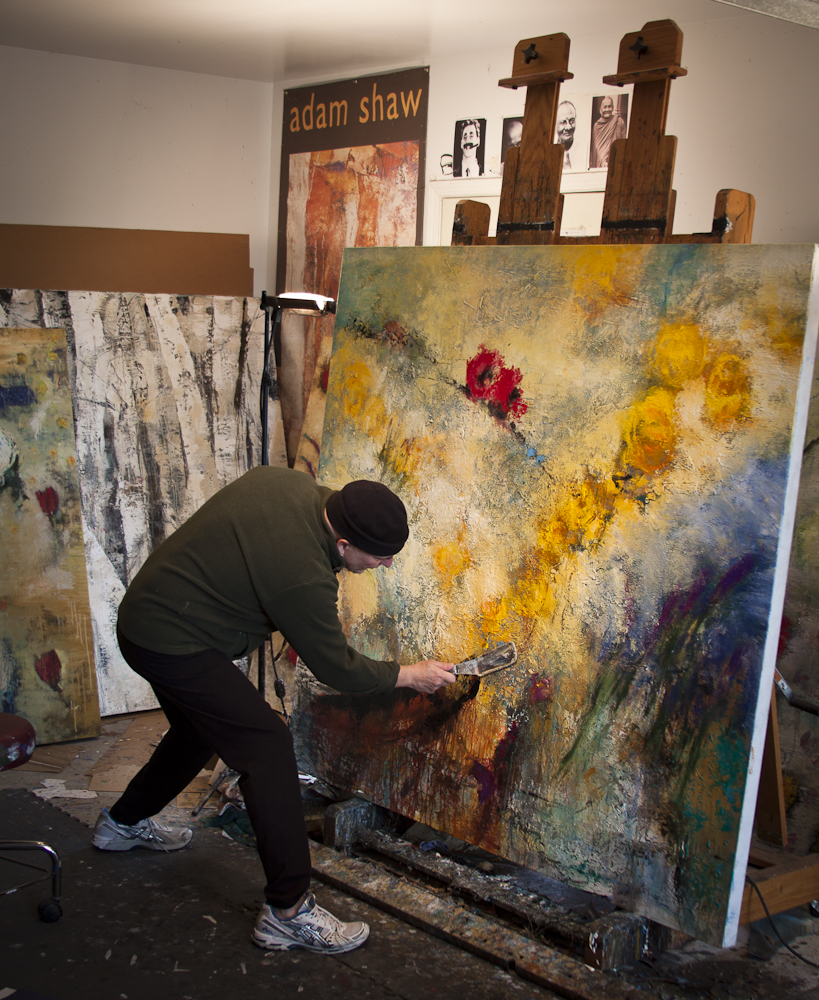
Adam Shaw in studio

In his early career, Shaw would often work on a single piece over many months, spending hours “just looking” interspersed with outbursts of painterly activity. At the time he was generally regarded as a “color field” painter. However, in the 1990s and beyond he became preoccupied with dense textural surfaces and his work habits evolved to exploring the development of an entire body of work simultaneously, with as many as 20 paintings in varying degrees of process. In creating his paintings he uses brushes, sticks, rags, pouring, sanding, grinding, scraping, etc., working both on the easel and the floor inside his studio in the Sonoma wine country north of San Francisco, as well as outside where his paintings often bake in the sun.

He will frequently work on a painting for an entire day, later to completely scrape off all the paint that was applied, leaving only remnants of the paint that found its way into previously gouged out areas. He works like this over the course of years to build a single painting, with its layers mostly never seen by the viewer though they impart a sense of history. Throughout the process the use of language — written, painted, or scraped into the paint — is actively employed, expressing poetic, philosophical and personal messages, most of which get covered over or remain as fragmentary relics.

His work expands the tradition of abstraction by reliance on classical painterly techniques and a view towards the referential. He has explored numerous directions loosely referred to as landscape, flowers, trees, and work using language as an element.

Adam Shaw's process involves the application and removal often of well over one hundred layers on a single painting, which may take over a decade to make, creating lush textural surfaces that retain a remarkable luminosity. His work is informed by lifelong study of esoteric western and eastern traditions evoking transformative spiritual experience.

== Gallery ==
The following images show representative work from four categories of Adam Shaw paintings.

=== Landscapes ===
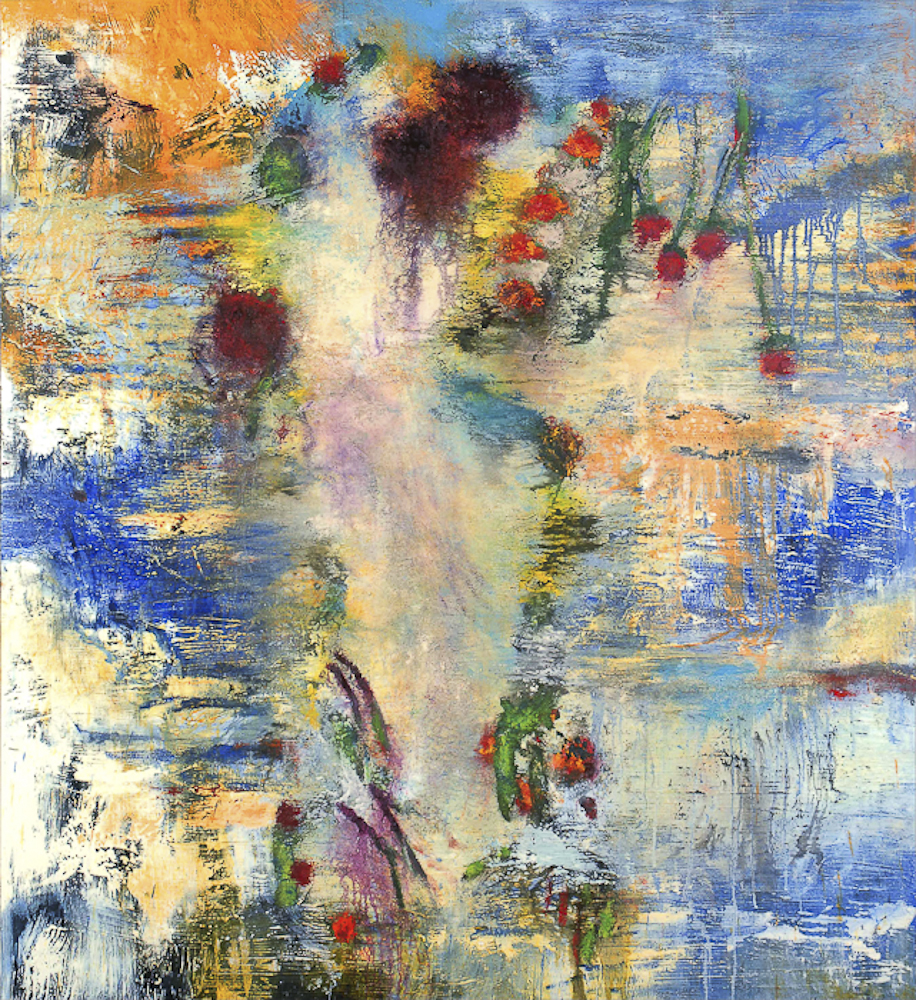
Adam Shaw, When I Was a Boy, 70x64

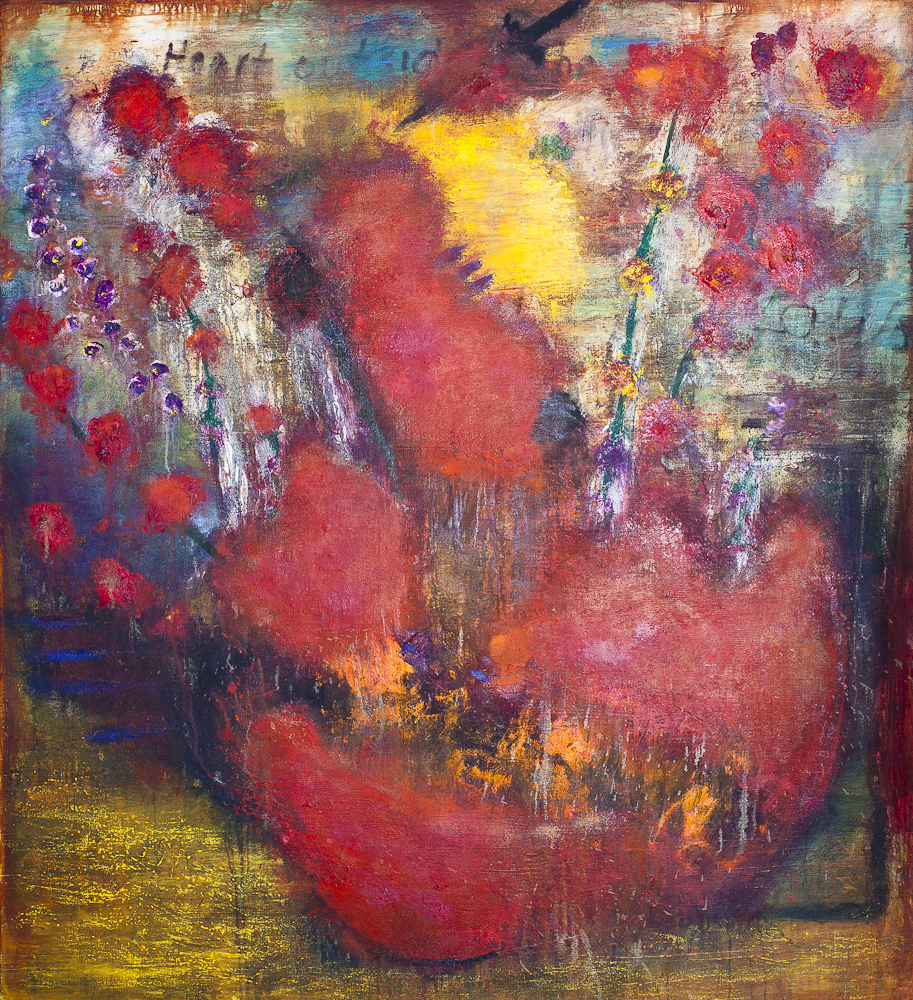
Adam Shaw, Heart Outside the Body, 66x60

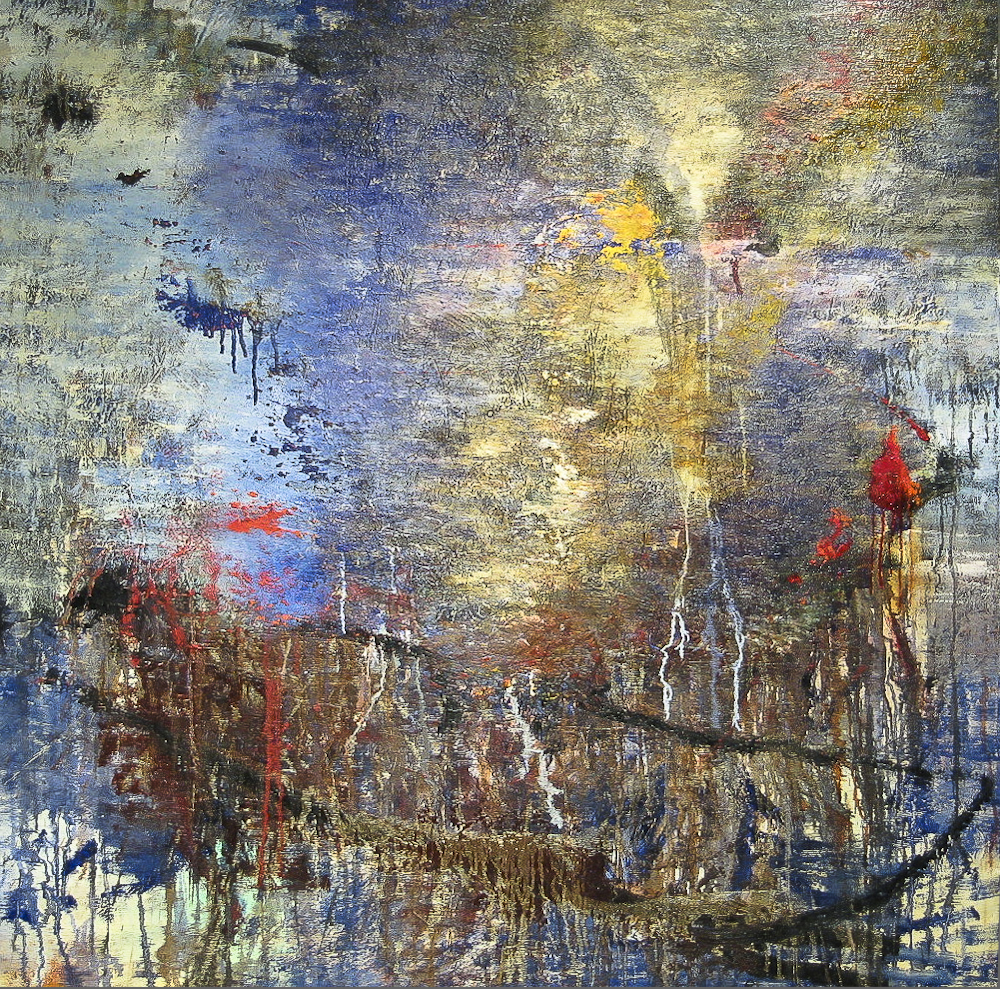
Adam Shaw, Dharma Vessel, 60x60

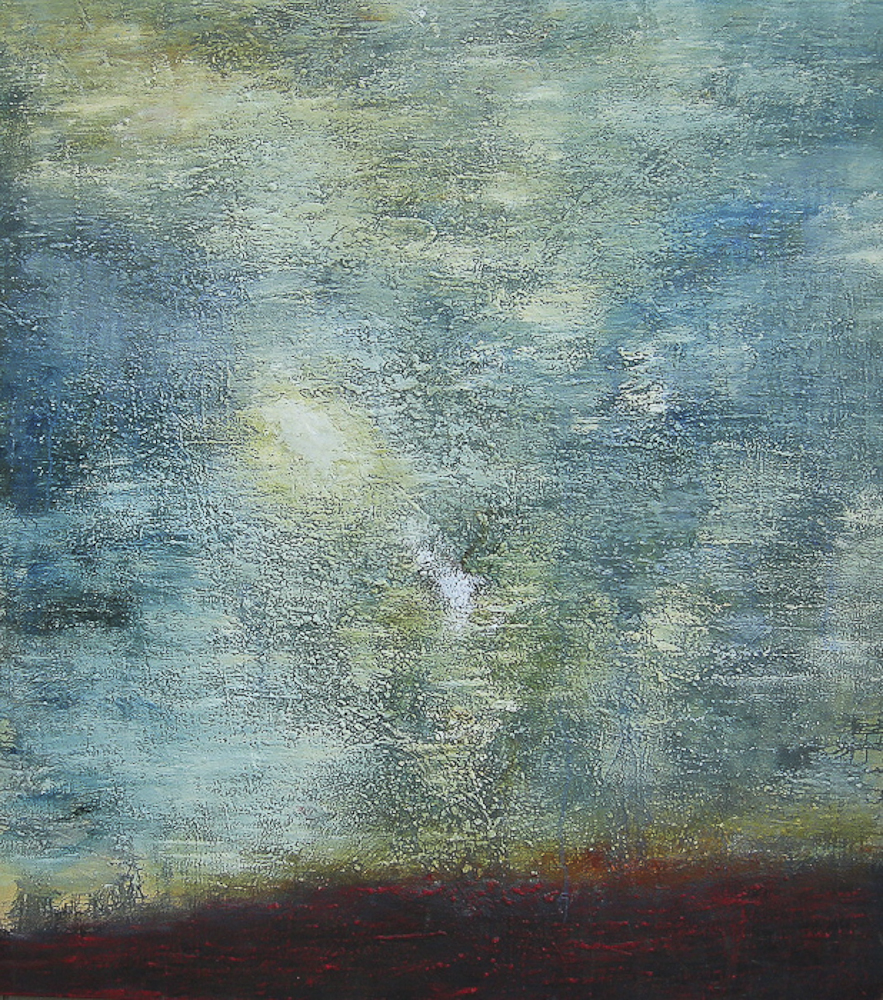
Adam Shaw, Meditation, 66x60

=== Trees ===
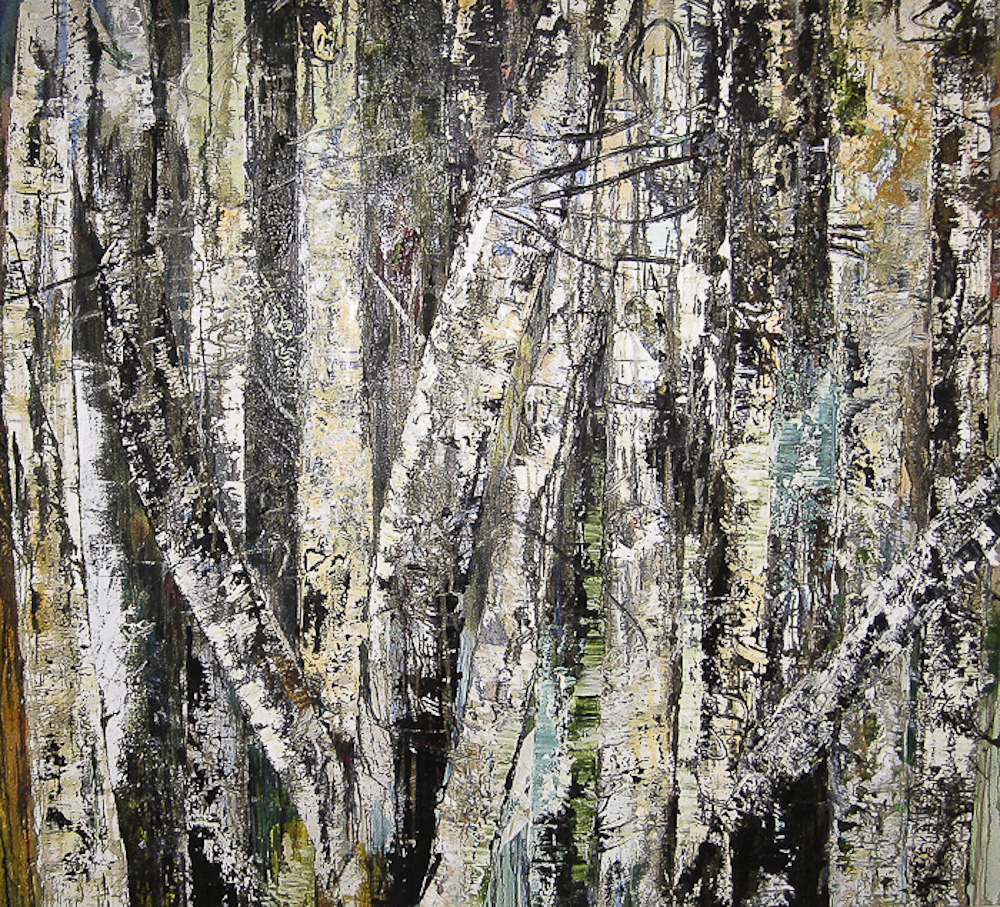
Adam Shaw, Sparta, 60x66

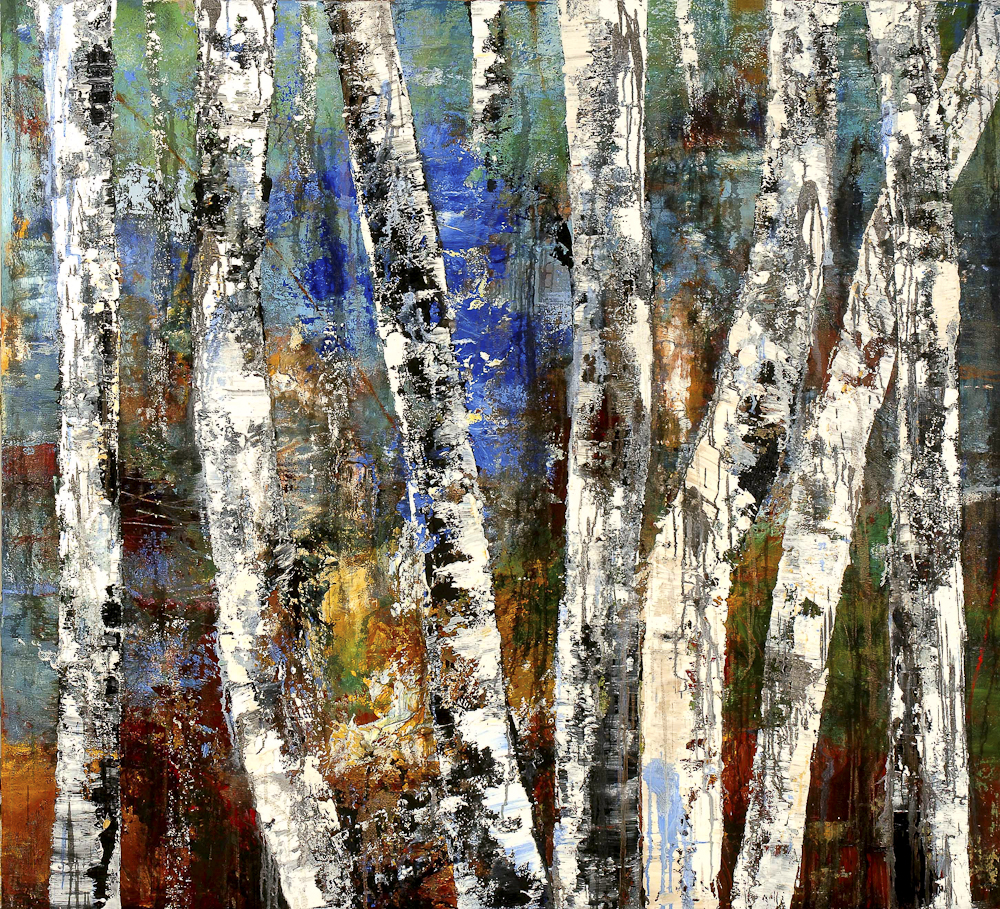
Adam Shaw, Sisters, 60x66

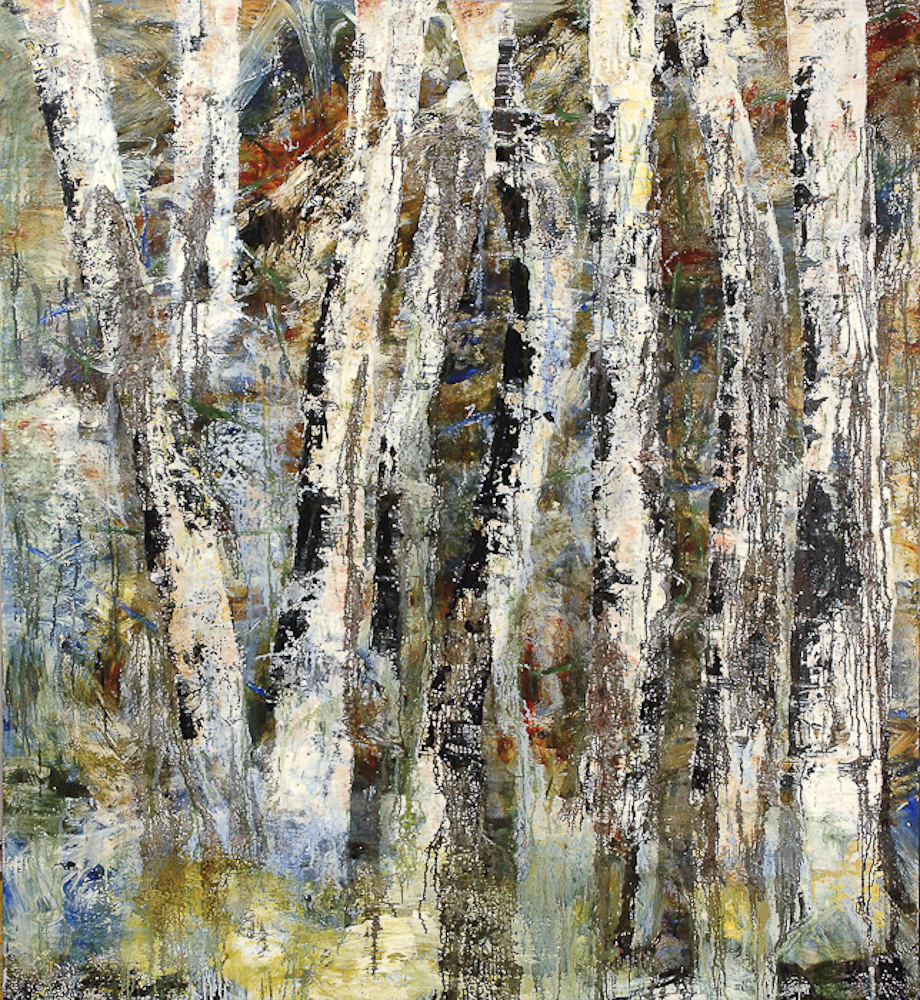
Adam Shaw, Once Were Angels, 70x64

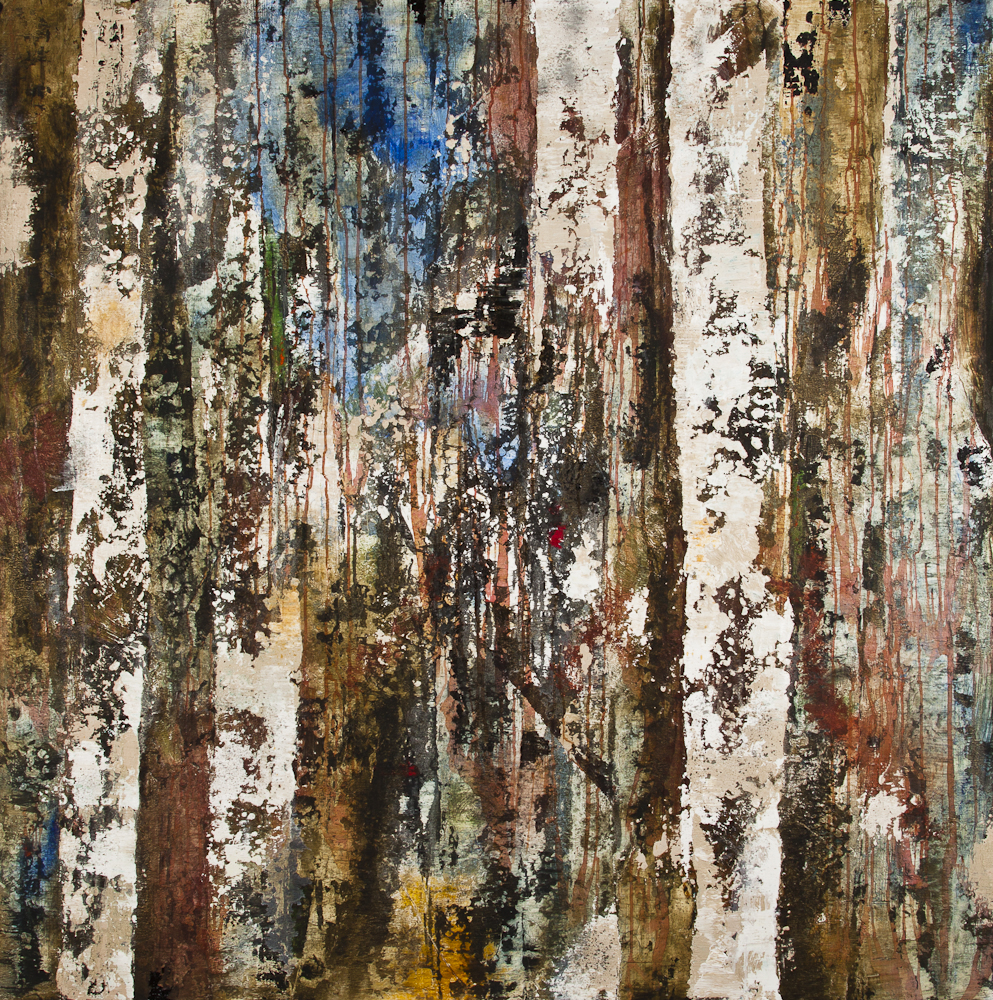
Adam Shaw, Little Red Bird, 66x60

=== Flowers ===
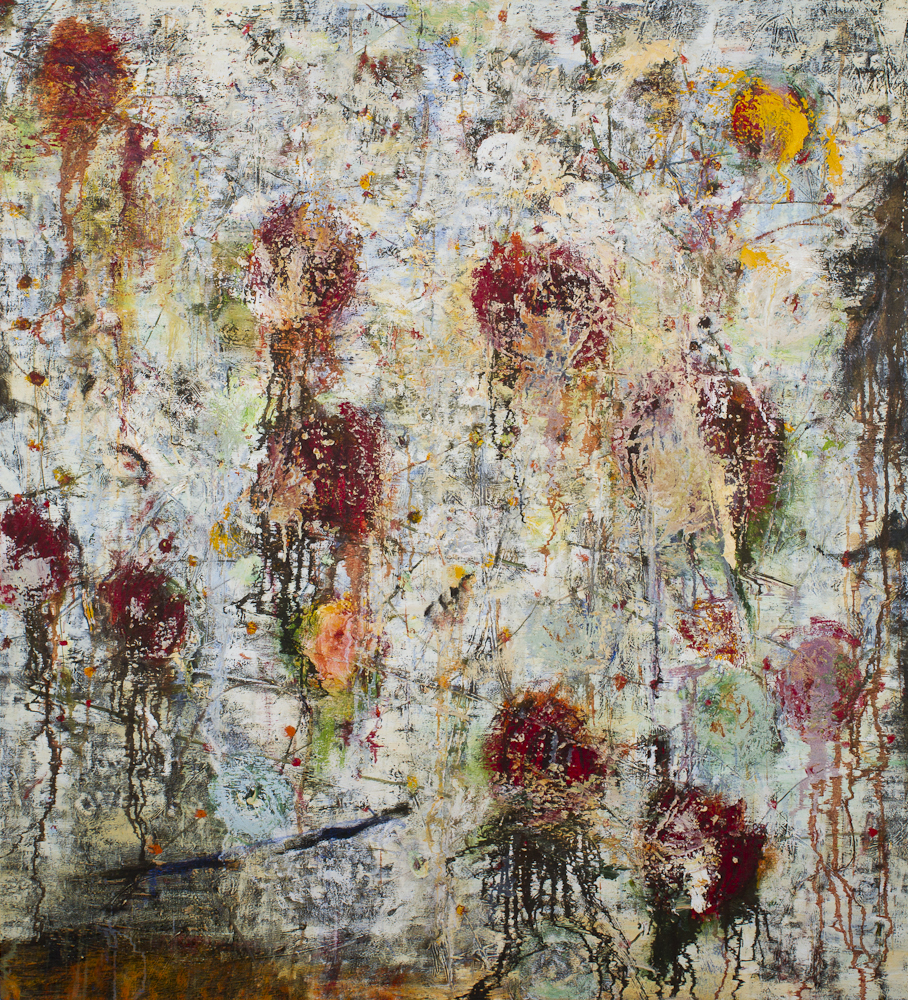
Adam Shaw, Garden of Earthly Delights 66x60

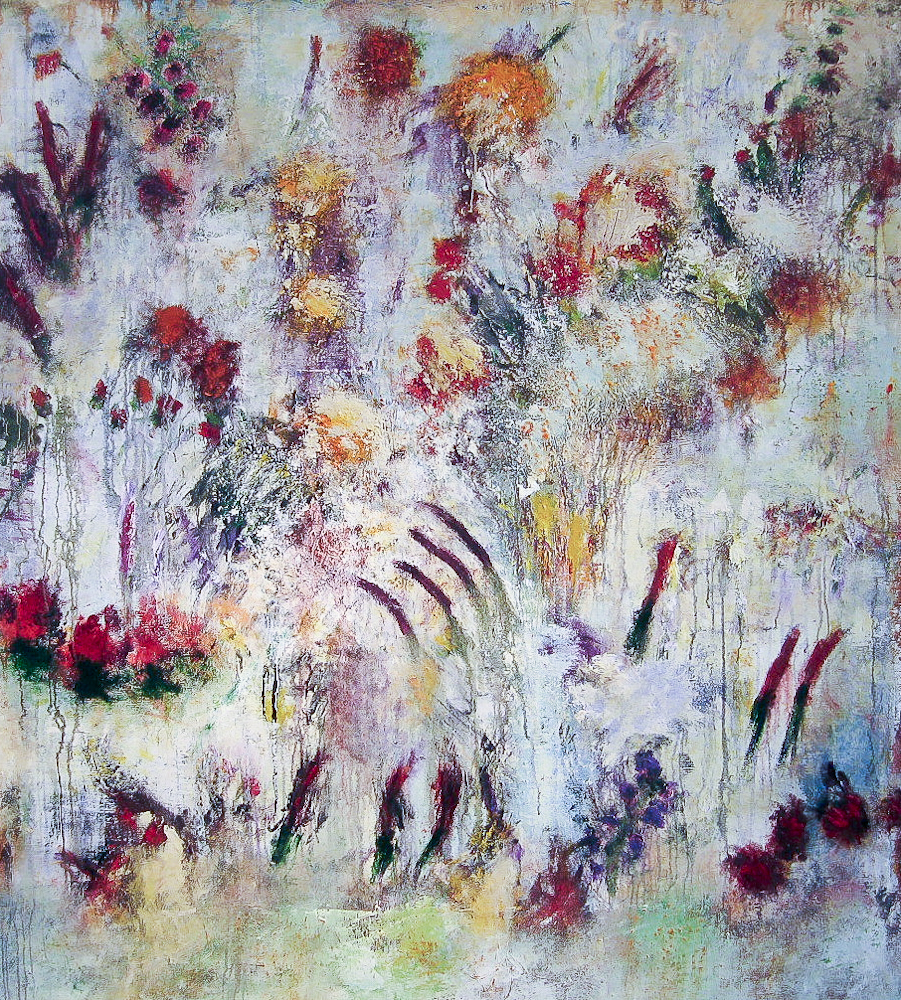
Adam Shaw, Near Shore Creates the Far, 66x60

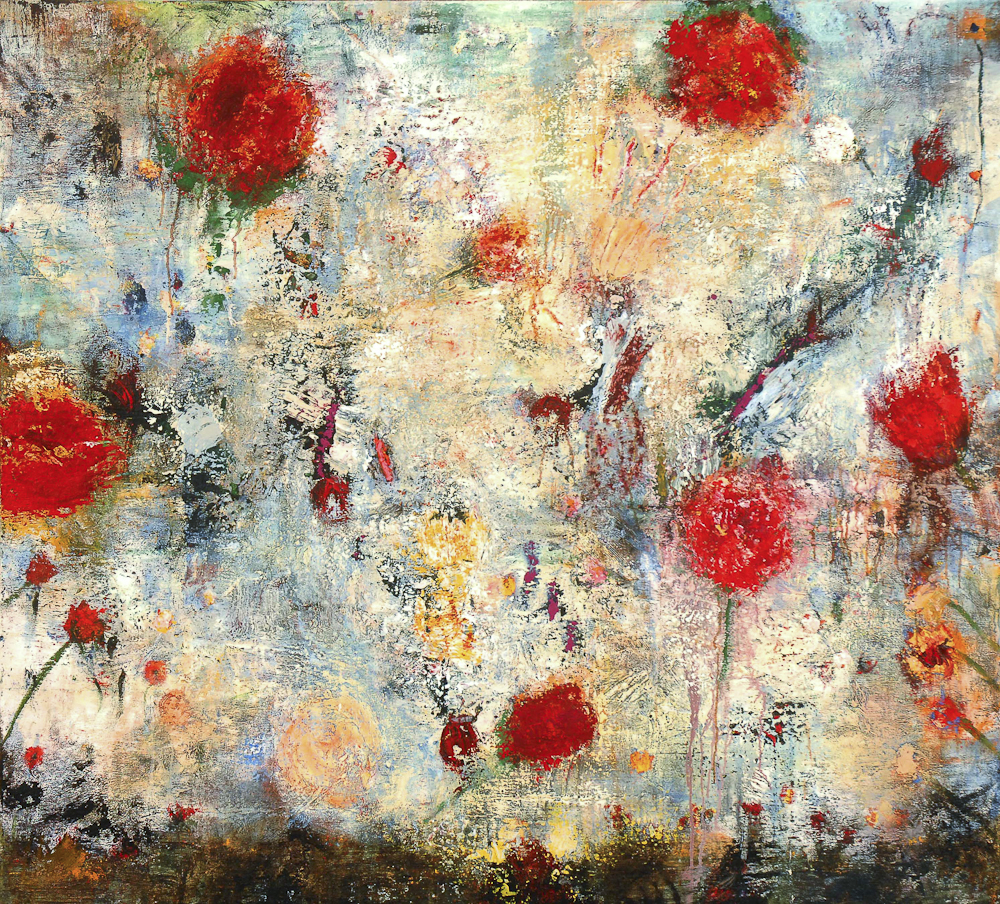
Adam Shaw, Evolution of Stars, 60x66

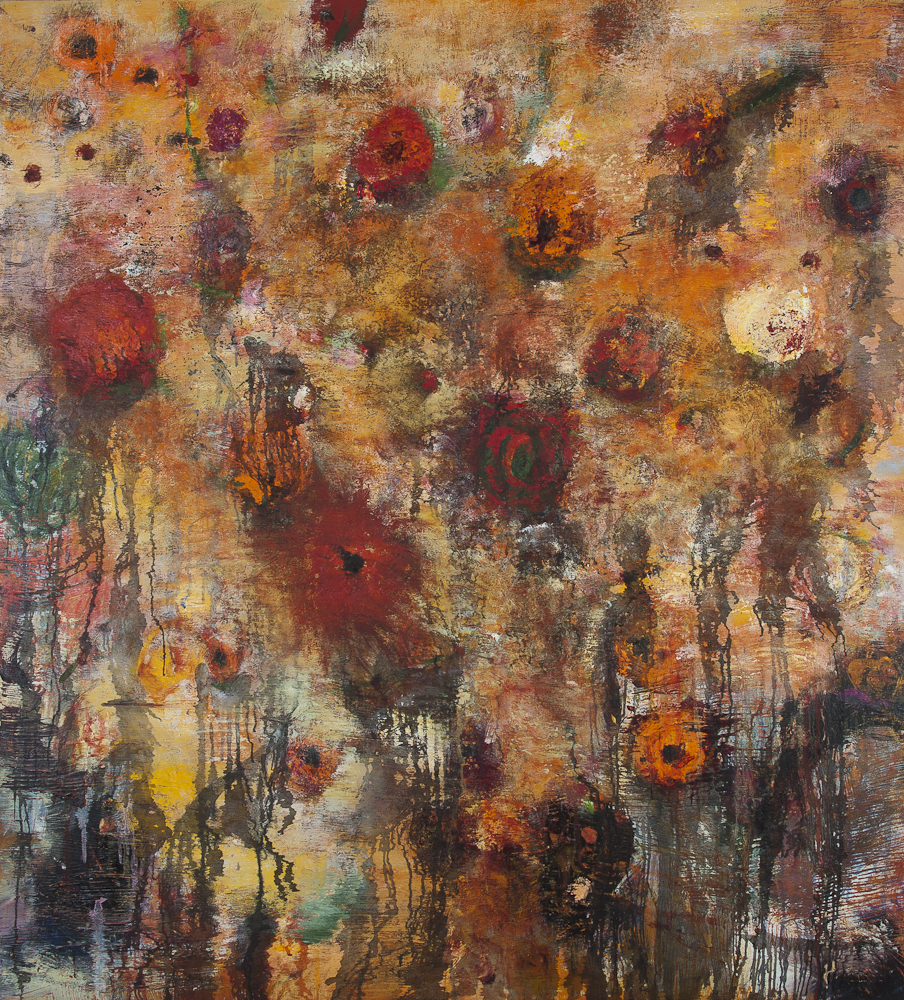
Adam Shaw, Basho's Flowers 66x60

=== Language ===
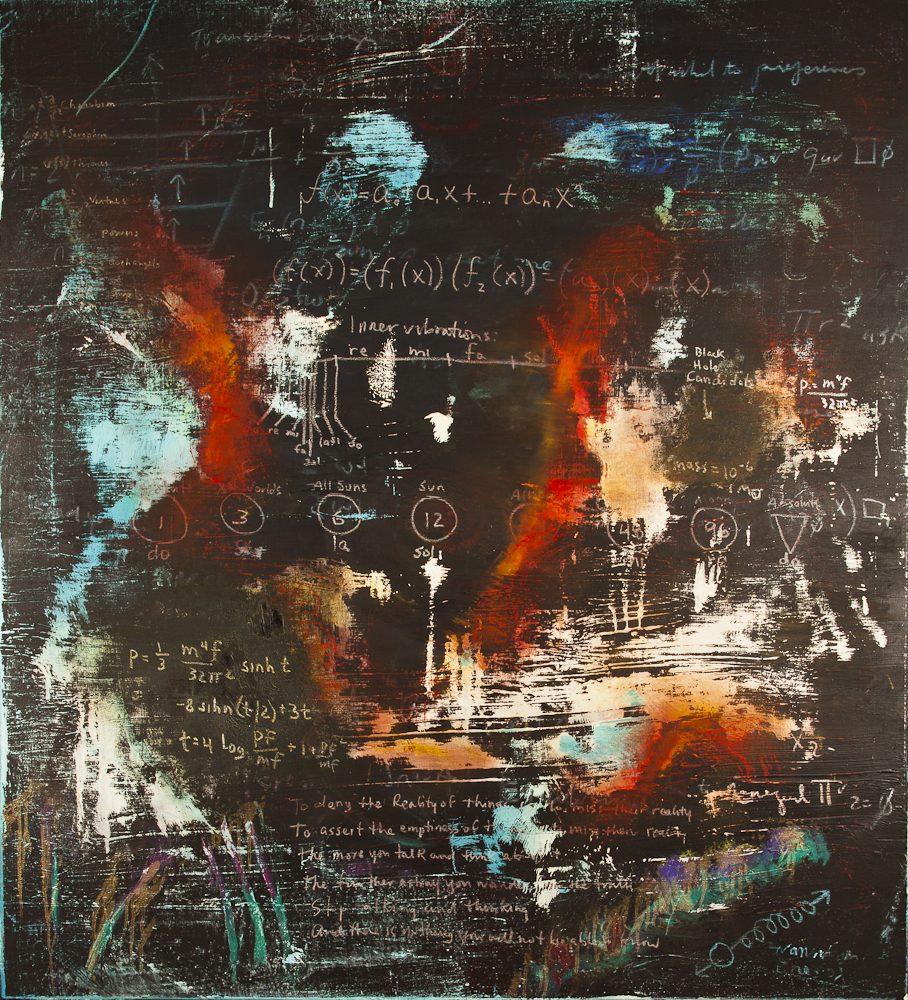
Adam Shaw, Theory of Everything, 66x60

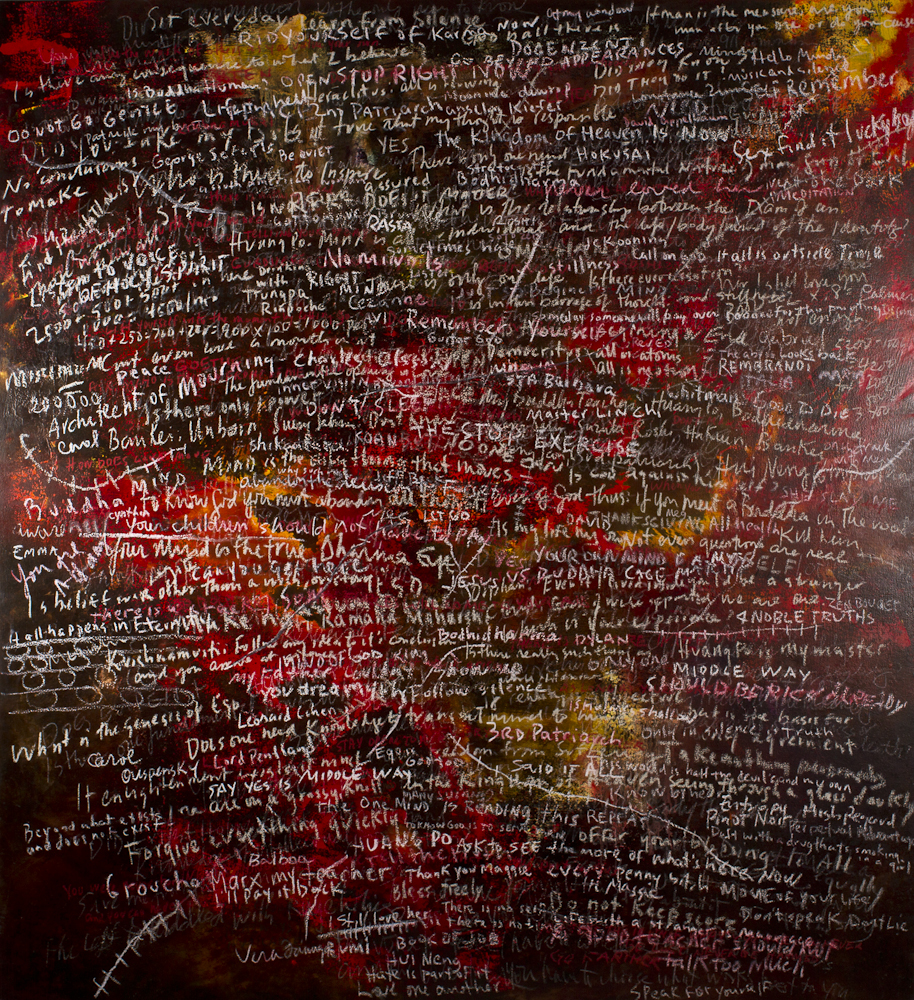
Adam Shaw, Arising of Thought, 70x64

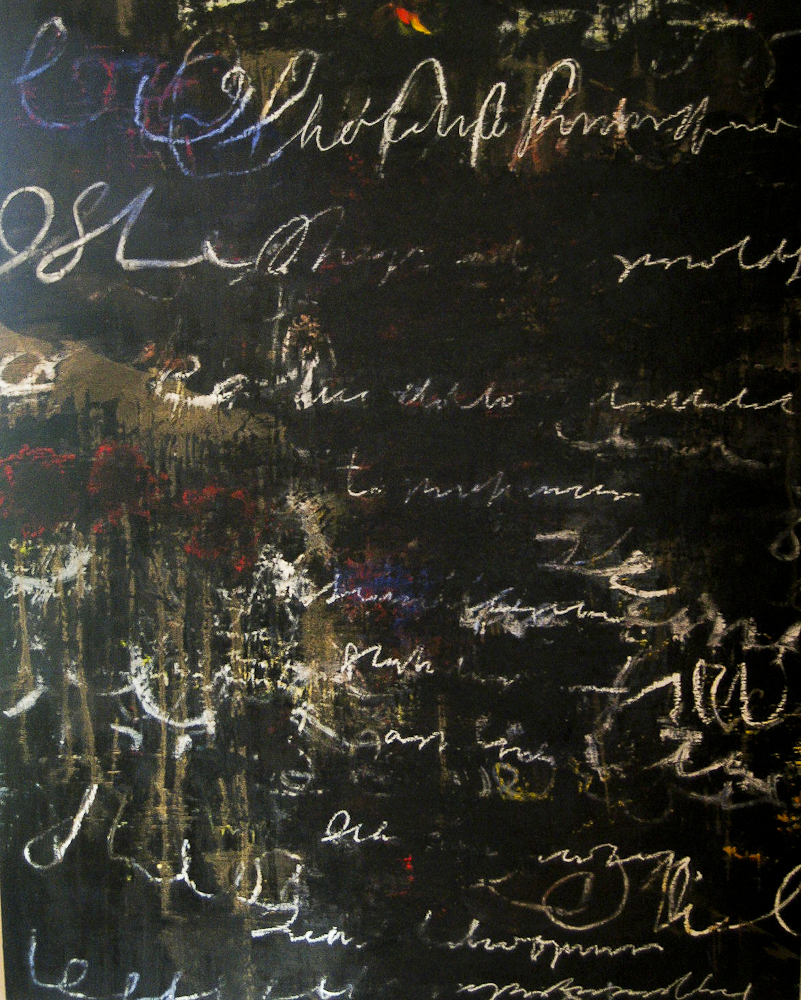
Adam Shaw, Sutra, 50x40

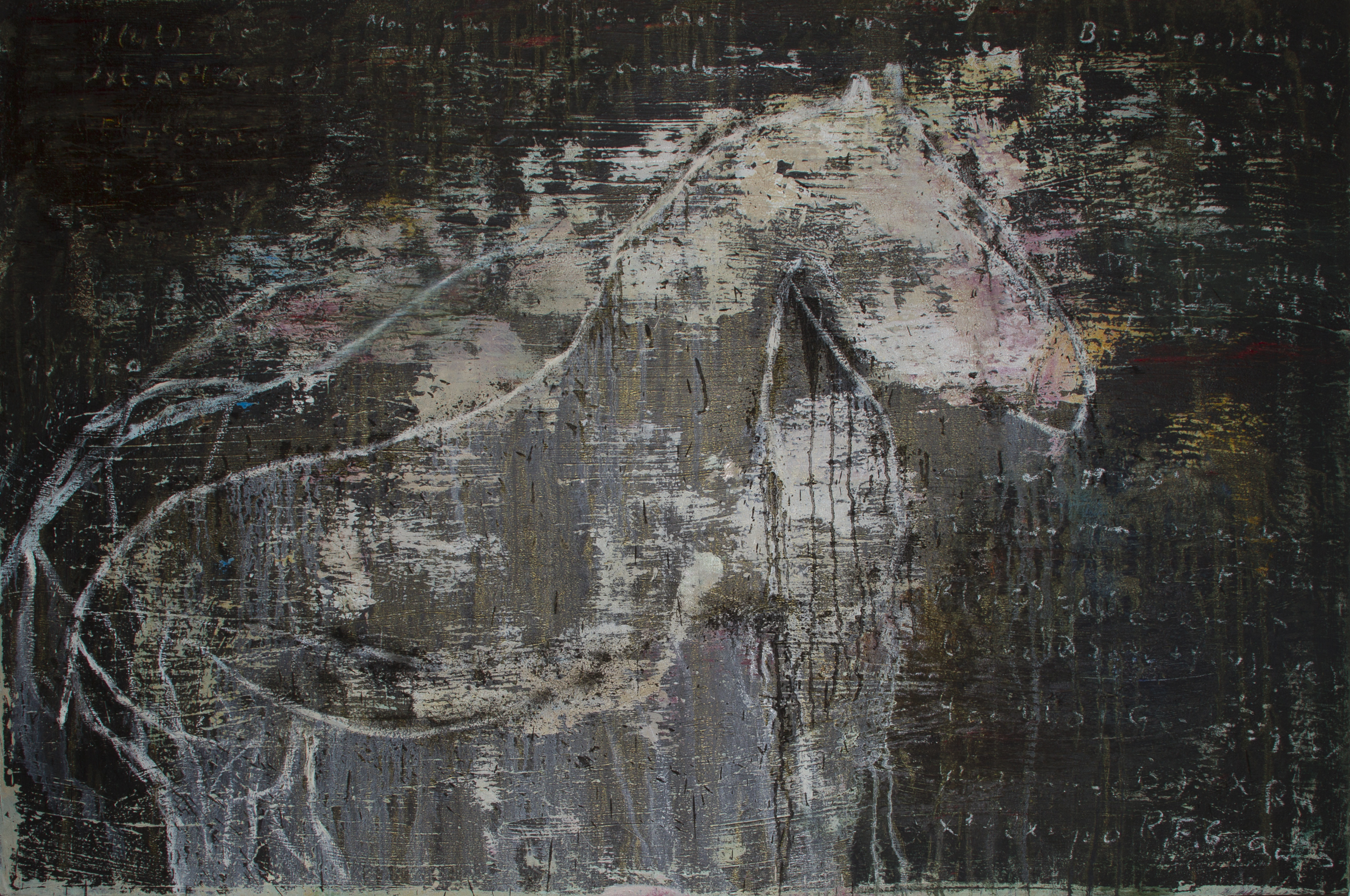
Adam Shaw, Lascaux, 40x60

From Shaw's website.

=== Public collections ===
- Bank of America Building, San Francisco, CA
- Gap Corporate Offices, San Francisco, CA
- Los Alamos National Bank, Santa Fe, NM
- Marriott Hotel, San Francisco, CA
- 3 Com Corporation, San Jose, CA
- Industrial Indemnity, San Francisco, CA
- Quantum Corporation, Santa Clara, CA
- Magley and Associates, San Francisco, CA
- Silicon Valley Bank, San Jose, CA
- Asante Partners, Menlo Park, CA
- Motion Picture Actors of America Association, Woodland Hills, CA
- eBay Corporation, San Jose, CA
- St. Francis Hospital Foundation, San Francisco, CA
- Cushman Wakefield, San Francisco, CA
- Shorenstein Realty, San Francisco, CA
- San Francisco Bay Club, San Francisco, CA
