= Cathay Cineplexes =

Cinema chain operating in Singapore and Malaysia

- Type: Private
- Industry: Media distribution
- Founded: 3 October 1939; 87 years ago
- Defunct: 1 September 2025; 14 months ago
- Headquarters: Singapore
- Products: Movie theaters
- Parent: mm2 Entertainment
- Website: cathaycineplexes.com.sg

Cathay Cineplexes Pte Ltd was a Singaporean cinema chain. Established in 1939 at the Cathay Building, it was Singapore's first air-conditioned cinema and the first to screen Western films. The company was owned and operated by Singapore-listed media conglomerate mm2 Entertainment. The cinema chain ceased operations in 2025 due to financial issues.

== History ==
The first Cathay Cinema was at the Cathay Building on 2 Handy Road, Singapore. It was Singapore's first air-conditioned cinema building, opening on 3 October 1939 with the film The Four Feathers. The cinema had a seating capacity of 1,321 and ancillary spaces such as a women's lounge and a spacious lounge bar. The theatre was leased to and operated by Associated Theatres Ltd, but was later seconded by the colonial government and Malayan Broadcasting Corporation during WWII. The cinema was reopened in September 1945 when the Cathay Organisation regained complete control.

Cathay became a household name in Singapore and Malaysia by the 1970s, where the chain owned and operated 75 cinemas at its peak. This included Singapore's only open-air drive-in cinema, the Jurong Drive-in, which opened on 14 July 1971. The drive-in cinema could accommodate around 900 cars and 300 people in its walk-in gallery. It was located on Yuan Ching Road, Jurong, next to the Japanese Garden. Citing poor attendance with only 200 customers daily for its two screening due to video piracy, the Jurong Drive-in Cinema was closed on 30 September 1985.

On 16 November 1990, Cathay opened The Picturehouse, showing art films, in the S$6.4-million-extension built next to the Cathay Building. The first movie shown was Come See the Paradise, an American historical drama film written and directed by Alan Parker.

On 1 September 1999, Cathay took over the 10 screens cineplex at Causeway Point which was formerly owned by Studio Cinema after it was evicted by the mall management.

In 2007, Cathay collaborated with Emaar Malls Group to run two cineplexes in Dubai, United Arab Emirates, and possibly up to 150 cineplexes across malls in the Middle East.

=== Acquisition by mm2 Asia ===
On 24 November 2017, mm2 Asia Ltd acquired the Singapore business operations operated by Cathay Cineplexes. MM2 Asia had earlier acquired Cathay's Malaysian cinema operations in September 2015. The two cinemas acquired were Cathay Cineplex Damansara at e@Curve in Petaling Jaya, Selangor, and Cathay Cineplex City Square at Johor Bahru City Square. The cinema chain added 3 more cineplexes in 2015, acquiring Mega Cinemas Management Sdn Bhd's sites in Prai, Langkawi and Bertam. In 2016, mm2 Asia further acquired 13 cinemas in Malaysia from Lotus Fivestar Cinemas.

In June 2017, mm2 Asia agreed to acquire the 50% stake of Golden Village Multiplex cinema business in Singapore, held by Australia's Village Cinemas. However, the deal was rejected by Orange Sky Golden Harvest Entertainment (Holdings), the owner of the other half-share of the Singapore business. In November of that same year (2017), mm2 Asia announced its intentions to acquire all Cathay Cineplexes' Singapore cinema operations. In December 2020, mm2 Asia announced that it was in talks with Golden Village Singapore for a possible merger of its cinema businesses. The deal would be subject to approval from the mm2 Asia and Orange Sky Golden Harvest shareholders, the Singapore Exchange, the Hong Kong Stock Exchange, and the Competition and Consumer Commission of Singapore.

MM2 Asia is the only cinema operator with operations in Singapore and Malaysia, trading under the Cathay Cineplexes and mmCineplexes brands, respectively.

=== Post COVID-19 and decline ===
The COVID-19 pandemic affected the movie production and cinema businesses, and Cathay Cineplexes was ordered to close for several months in 2020, before reopening at reduced capacities.

In August 2021, mm2 Asia entered into a sale and purchase agreement with Kingsmead Properties to sell its cinema business. The sale did not go through due to the "uncertainty around the Omicron variant dampening investors' appetites," as announced by Kingsmead in January 2022.

In June 2022, Cathay Cineplexes announced that it would be shutting down its eponymous location at Handy Road by the end of that month after 83 years. The cinema space was taken over by independent cinema operator The Projector as Projector X: Picturehouse until June 2023, when the mall shuttered for a 2-year revamp. Cathay Cineplexes closed its Cineleisure Orchard outlet in June 2023, followed by its Parkway Parade cineplex two months later, as both locations were deemed to be no longer profitable. However, the company stated that the closures were part of its efforts to "right-size" its cinema operations, as it was also opening a new cinema in Century Square at Tampines in the fourth quarter of 2023.

The cineplex at AMK Hub was shuttered in June 2024 as the space was redesignated for other uses following the expiry of its lease. As part of their rightsizing operations, they acquired the only WE Cinemas location at 321 Clementi in October that same year.

In January 2025, Cathay Cineplexes received letters of demand for approximately S$2.7 million (US$2 million) in unpaid rent and other related costs for its operations at Century Square and Causeway Point.

In February 2025, Cathay Cineplexes closed its outlet at West Mall due to lease expiry. It also shuttered its outlet at Jem shortly after in March 2025 as the landlord had seized its premises over rent due in arrears.

In September 2025, the remaining four locations at Causeway Point, Century Square, Clementi 321 and Downtown East were shuttered, as it prepares to undergo voluntary liquidation after months of failed negotiations with its creditors.

== Former locations ==
Prior to closing down, Cathay Cineplexes last operated 29 screens in four locations in Singapore.

Cinema	Location	Screens/Halls	Seats	Tenure	Notes	Ref
321 Clementi	Clementi	10	728	2024–2025	Formerly Empress theatre from 1981 to 2006, and distributed Eng Wah from 2015 to 1 November 2024.	
AMK Hub	Ang Mo Kio	8	1784	2007–2024		
Causeway Point	Woodlands	7	1307	1999–2025	10-hall cineplex previously operated by Studio Cinemas until 1999. Reduced to seven halls in 2001.	
Century Square	Tampines	6	720	2023–2025	Previously operated by Century Cineplex which was managed by Shaw Theatres from 1995 to 2017. It was then operated by Filmgarde from June 2018 until 24 April 2022.	
Cathay	Orchard Road	8	1812	1939–2022	Temporarily closed for refurbishment from 2000 to 2006.	
Galaxy/Gala	Bukit Timah	1	850	1978–1990s		
Jem	Jurong East	10	1600	2013–2025		
Jurong Drive-In	Jurong East	1	900	1971–1985	Largest drive-in in Asia when opened in 1971 until closure on 30 September 1985.	
Majestic	Outram	1	1194	1928–1998		
NTUC Downtown East	Pasir Ris	6	1200	2008–2025		
Odeon	Downtown Core	1	1546	1953–1984		
Odeon–Katong	Geylang	1	unknown	1950s–1993		
Parkway Parade	Marine Parade	7	898	2017–2023		
Regal	Bukit Merah	1	unknown	1979–1998		
Ruby	Novena	1	unknown	1958–1983		
West Mall	Bukit Batok	6	1006	2013–2025	Formerly operated by Eng Wah Organisation.	

== Cathay CineHome ==
Cathay CineHome is a direct-to-consumer rental streaming service for video on demand (VOD) offered by Cathay Cineplexes and mm2 Entertainment. The service was terminated in 2024.
