= Percy McNeice =

British colonial administrator (1901–1998)

Sir Percy McNeice OBE CMG
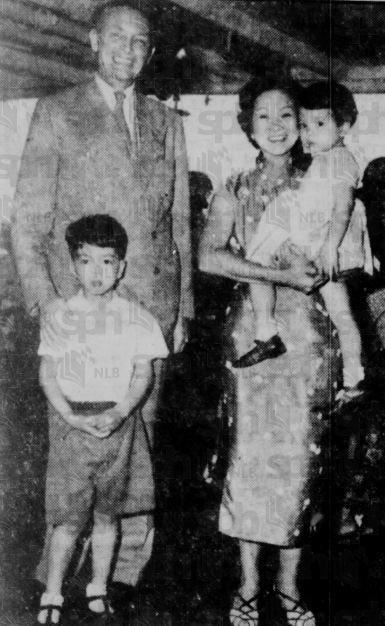
- Percy McNeice and family in 1954

President of Singapore City Council
- In office 1950–1955
- Preceded by: W. L. Blythe
- Succeeded by: James Taylor Rea

Personal details
- Born: Thomas Percy Ferguson McNeice; 16 August 1901 Kilskeery, County Tyrone, Ireland, United Kingdom
- Died: 8 February 1998 (aged 96) Gleneagles Hospital, Singapore
- Spouse: Loke Yuen Peng (m. 1947)
- Children: 2
- Education: Keble College, Oxford
- Occupation: Colonial administrator

Sir Thomas Percy Ferguson McNeice (16 August 1901 – 8 February 1998) was a British colonial administrator who was President of Singapore City Council from 1950 to 1955.

== Early life and education ==
McNeice was born on 16 August 1901 in Kilskeery, County Tyrone, Ireland, the son of Canon W. G. McNeice and Mary Masterson. He was educated at Bradford Grammar School and Keble College, Oxford (MA).

== Career ==
McNeice joined the Malayan Civil Service in 1925, and served mostly in the Chinese Protectorate at Ipoh, Kuala Lumpur, Seremban and Johor Bahru. Fluent in Cantonese, his work included rescuing children from neglect and abuse. During the Japanese occupation, he was captured and sent to work on the Death Railway on the Thai-Burmese border.

After the war, he established and headed the Social Welfare Department, Singapore in 1946 which organised social services. In response to substantial rises in the price of food and to combat black marketeering, he set up "People's Restaurants" offering nutritious meals for 35 cents to low paid workers. He also established child welfare centres which cared for neglected children. In 1947, he was awarded the OBE for his contributions to social welfare. In 1949, he founded the Singapore Family Planning Board at a time when contraception was a new idea in the region.

In 1949, he joined the Municipal Commission of Singapore, which shortly after became the Singapore Municipal Council. After serving as its acting president for five months, he was confirmed as President of Singapore Municipal Council in 1950. Responsible for a wide range of services including public health, utilities, housing and finance, it paved the way for the subsequent establishment of separate government bodies. As head of the council, he also served as head of Singapore Investment Trust, the forerunner of the Singapore Housing Board.

After retiring in 1956, he settled in the Channel Islands where he resided for ten years before returning to live in Singapore where he became the oldest surviving member of the old Malayan Civil Service.

== Personal life and death ==
McNeice married Loke Yuen Peng (1917–2012), the sister of Loke Wan Tho and the daughter of Loke Yew, in 1947 and they had a son, Anthony Terence McNeice, and a daughter, Shelagh McNeice. McNeice was a fellow of the Zoological Society.

McNeice died on 8 February 1998 at Gleneagles Hospital, Singapore aged 96.

== Honours ==
McNeice was appointed Officer of the Order of the British Empire (OBE) in the 1947 New Year Honours. He was appointed Companion of the Order of St Michael and St George (CMG) in the 1953 Coronation Honours. He was created a Knight Bachelor in the 1956 New Year Honours.
