= Loke Cheng Kim =

Malaysian–Singaporean businesswoman and philanthropist

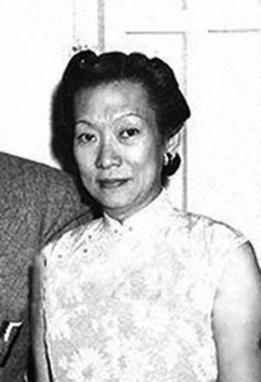
- Loke in 1947
- Born: Lim Cheng Kim; 5 May 1895; Penang, Straits Settlements, British Malaya (now Malaysia)
- Died: 17 January 1981 (aged 85); Singapore
- Education: Methodist Girls' School, Kuala Lumpur
- Spouse: Loke Yew
- Children: Son; Loke Wan Tho; Daughters; Loke Yuen Theng (Mrs Choo Kok Leong); Loke Yuen Peng (Lady Percy McNeice)
- Parent: Mother Soon Kui Sim
- Relatives: Lim Shuk Kwei (cousin and third wife of Loke Yew; deceased)

Loke Cheng Kim

Chinese name
- Traditional Chinese: 陸淑佳
- Simplified Chinese: 陆淑佳
- Hanyu Pinyin: Lù Shújiā
- Pha̍k-fa-sṳ: Lu̍k Su̍k-kâi
- Jyutping: Luk6 Suk6 Gaai1
- Hokkien POJ: Lio̍k Siok-ka
- Tâi-lô: Lio̍k Siok-ka

Loke Cheng Kim (simplified Chinese: 陆淑佳; traditional Chinese: 陸淑佳; pinyin: Lù Shújiā; Jyutping: Luk6 Suk6 Gaai1; Pe̍h-ōe-jī: Lio̍k Siok-ka; Pha̍k-fa-sṳ: Lu̍k Su̍k-kâi; 5 May 1895 – 17 Jan 1981) was a Malaysian–Singaporean businesswoman and philanthropist.

== Early life ==
Born the eldest daughter of Chinese businessmen of Hokkien-Hakka descent from Penang which owned tin mines in Selangor and had been established in Malaya for generations. Her Hakka mother, Soon Kui Sim, took over the management of her husband's tin mines in Rawang, when he was forced to retire due to illness. Being largely illiterate, she devised her own complex hieroglyphic bookkeeping system to manage the family's extensive finances. Loke's mother would even go to the mines personally and wake the labourers up to work by literally pulling them out of bed. Not having had the opportunity to be schooled, she was determined that her daughter would not be illiterate and sent the young girl to study at the Methodist Girls' School Kuala Lumpur [MGSKL] by train – a journey of 20 miles each way.

Once, Loke fell asleep on the train on her way home from school and she awakened just as the train was starting to leave Rawang Station. She was so scared of returning home late and receiving a good chiding from her mother that she leapt out of the moving train. Fortunately the train was not moving fast as it was just leaving the station so she escaped with a few bruises. However, she still received a chiding from her mother when the latter was informed by the station master of what had happened. Despite her domineering character, her mother's strength and determination became a great influence on Loke's life.

== Personal life ==
Loke was matchmade by other relatives and married Loke Yew in 1914, after his third wife and her distant cousin Lim Shuk Kwei died. After only three years of marriage and the birth of three children, Loke died. Upon his death, she had to bring up three children on her own, and was especially concerned with the poor health of her eldest child: her son Wan Tho. This spurred her to the point of bringing the children abroad for education and healthcare in Switzerland in 1929.

Life in Switzerland with its pure air and peaceful scenery inspired the Loke children and they developed a love of nature. Wan Tho excelled in sports at school and became an avid mountaineer, birdwatcher and photographer later in his life. Yuen Peng's interest in nature led her to become a renowned nature conservationist in Singapore and Malaya, and she devoted her life to nature photography.

Loke returned to Kuala Lumpur to oversee the management of her late husband's assets and businesses. In 1936 she incorporated Associated Theatres Ltd (later renamed Cathay Organisation), registering her son Wan Tho, as one of the owners of the business. At that time Wan Tho was still an undergraduate at Cambridge University. She proceeded to build the Loke family's first multiplex: the Pavilion Theatre in Kuala Lumpur. In 1937, she purchased a site at Dhoby Ghaut in Singapore where she constructed the modern Cathay Building and developed cinema, hotel and restaurant businesses. When the Cathay building was completed in 1939, it was the first skyscraper in Singapore before the war and the signature building of Cathay Organisation. Before their home was occupied by the Japanese, Loke was evacuated to British Raj India and, during the war years there, started a Chinese restaurant in Bangalore.

On the liberation of Singapore, Loke returned in 1946 whereupon she was presented with a plaque by Lord Louis Mountbatten commemorating his occupancy of the Cathay Building. She also bought another property in Katong which had been a hospital for the Japanese during the war, and converted it into the Ocean Park Hotel. The hotel grew to become a popular haunt by locals for alfresco dining and dancing. She was concurrently also actively involved with the management of the Cathay Hotel in the Cathay Building and developing many of her properties in the area surrounding the Cathay Keris Studios.

== Other passions in life ==
Loke was also an art lover collector, and had a passion for gardening. She was known to have arranged the flowers in the Cathay Chinese Restaurant herself on many special occasions.

From as long as Loke herself can remember, her mother Soon Kui Sim insisted that girls must become literate and having an education. This quality rubbed off on Loke, and for most her life she devoted much of her time to social welfare and education of children especially girls. Yuen Peng remembers her mother had helped two girls from St. Hilda's School in Katong and putting them through university education in Australia. She was President of the Singapore Chinese Ladies' Association, and of the Chinese Women's Athletic Association before the war, and President of the Chinese Relief Fund Ladies' Section in Kuala Lumpur when the Second Sino-Japanese War broke out.

Loke was known to enjoy her food, especially Peranakan food, a legacy of her Penang heritage and practised tai chi everyday until ill health disabled her. Even in her retirement years she was very active in all her businesses and continued to make stock investments. Loke's shrewdness and determination had been a great influence on the life of her son Loke Wan Tho, till the end of his life. In spite of her canniness, Loke was a very ethical woman, especially towards honesty and fair dealing and she held to what she said to others.

Loke died in 1981 at the age of 86. In memory of her lifetime of philanthropy, the Loke Cheng Kim Foundation in Singapore continues the tradition of helping needy students to pursue further education in foreign universities overseas, with the Loke Cheng Kim Scholarship. The Saint Andrew's Junior College Singapore also named one of their halls Loke Cheng Kim Hall in memory of Loke.
