= Lu You (disambiguation) =

Lu You may refer to:

- Loke Yew (Lu You), Malayan business magnate of Cantonese descent (1845–1917)
- Lu You, Chinese historian and poet of the Southern Song dynasty (1125–1210)
