= Loke Yew =

Pioneer of Kuala Lumpur

- 陸佑
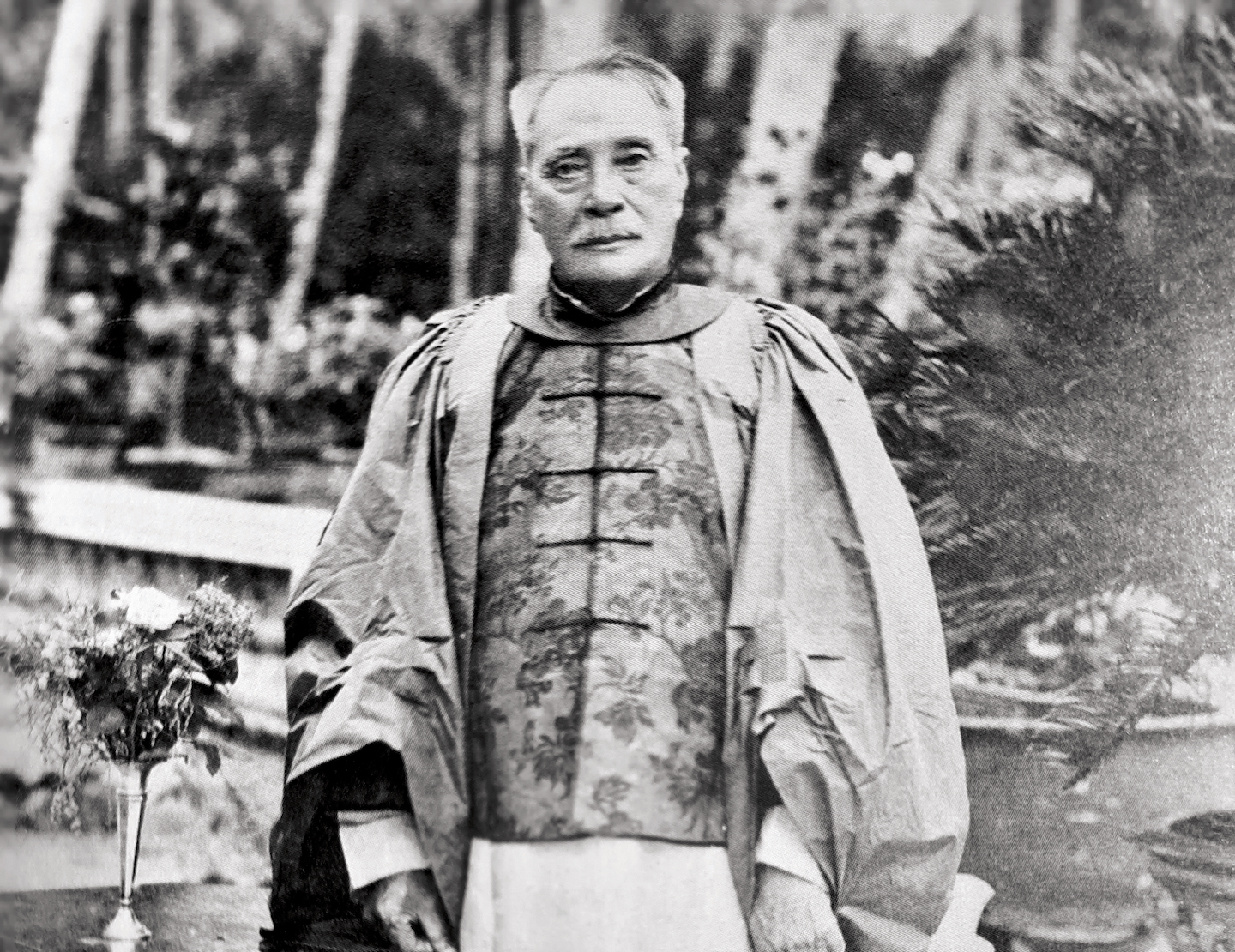
- Born: Wong Loke Yew; 9 October 1845; Heshan, Guangdong, Qing Empire
- Died: 24 February 1917 (aged 71); Kuala Lumpur, Selangor, British Malaya
- Resting place: Hawthornden Estate; 3°11′0″N 101°45′0″E
- Known for: Pioneer of Kuala Lumpur
- Spouse(s): Leung Suet (1st wife); Leung Jun (2nd wife); Lim Shuk Kwei (3rd wife;d. 1914); Lim Cheng Kim (4th wife; b. 1895, d. 1981)
- Children: 11, including Loke Wan Tho
- Relatives: Nancy Kwan (great granddaughter)

Loke Yew
- Traditional Chinese: 陸佑
- Simplified Chinese: 陆佑
Transcriptions
Standard Mandarin
- Hanyu Pinyin: Lù Yòu
Yue: Cantonese
- Jyutping: Luk6 Jau6
Southern Min
- Hokkien POJ: Lio̍k Iū
- Tâi-lô: Lio̍k Iū

Alternative Chinese name
- Traditional Chinese: 黃如佑
- Simplified Chinese: 黄如佑
Transcriptions
Standard Mandarin
- Hanyu Pinyin: Huáng Rúyòu
Yue: Cantonese
- Jyutping: Wong4 Jyu4 Jau6
Southern Min
- Hokkien POJ: N̂g Jû-iū
- Tâi-lô: N̂g Jû-iū

Loke Yew CMG (Chinese: 陸佑; pinyin: Lù Yòu; Jyutping: Luk6 Jau6; Pe̍h-ōe-jī: Lio̍k Iū; 1845–1917), born Wong Loke Yew, was a Malayan business magnate of Cantonese descent. During his lifetime, he played a significant role in the development of Kuala Lumpur and was also one of the founding fathers of Victoria Institution in Kuala Lumpur.

== Early life ==
Loke was born in Dongjiang village, Heshan, Guangdong, China, in 1845. He was the only son in a family of four children, and spent his childhood working as a farm hand before he decided to set sail to Malaya to seek his fortune. He was only 13 years old then.

The young Wong dropped his surname Wong upon arriving in Singapore, and changed his middle name to 陸(Lù) and adopted it as his surname as he thought the new name sounded more auspicious. His relatives recommended him for his first job at Kwong Man General Store, a provision shop in Market Street and earned $20 a month. Loke managed to save $99 after four years of hard work. With the money, he started his own provision store called Heng Loong.

== Business ==
Loke's business gradually grew and he left his staff and nephew, Cheong Yoke Choy, in charge of the store while he travelled to northern Malaya, particularly Perak to explore the tin mining business. Loke's initial mines at Kamunting did fairly well but tin prices fell during the Larut Wars which affected his business. He would lose $140,000 in his tin business. Loke would then profit from supplying food to members of the Ghee Hin Kongsi, of which he was a member, fighting during the Larut Wars.

After the Larut Wars and the Perak War, the Kinta District of Perak was opened up and Loke managed to re-established himself back in Perak.Loke would then go on to acquire and own many more tin mines, and rubber and coconut plantations in Perak. He also ventured into the pawnbroking business, and even obtained monopoly for liquor sales, gambling licences and other privileges from the colonial government.

Loke's other assets included several hundred hectares of land, real estate and properties in both Singapore, Malaya, Hong Kong and China. Loke Yew was the largest shareholder in Pahang Motor Car Service, owned shares in the Raub Straits Trading Company, Straits Steamship and Federal Engineers, partly owned Burmah Rice Mill, made investments in properties all over Singapore and Malaya. He played a leading role along with his nephews (sons of one of his sisters) named Cheong Yoke Choy and Cheong Yoke Choong in establishing Kwong Yik Bank, which opened in July 1915.

Loke also went into partnership with Thamboosamy Pillai in managing the New Tin Mining Company in Rawang. They were the first to use electric pumps for mining in Malaya.

In 1936, his son, Loke Wan Tho, along with his fourth wife, Lim Cheng Kim established Associated Theatres Ltd—later renamed Cathay Organisation. In 1939, the Loke conglomerate built Singapore's first skyscraper, the Cathay Building.

== Personal life ==
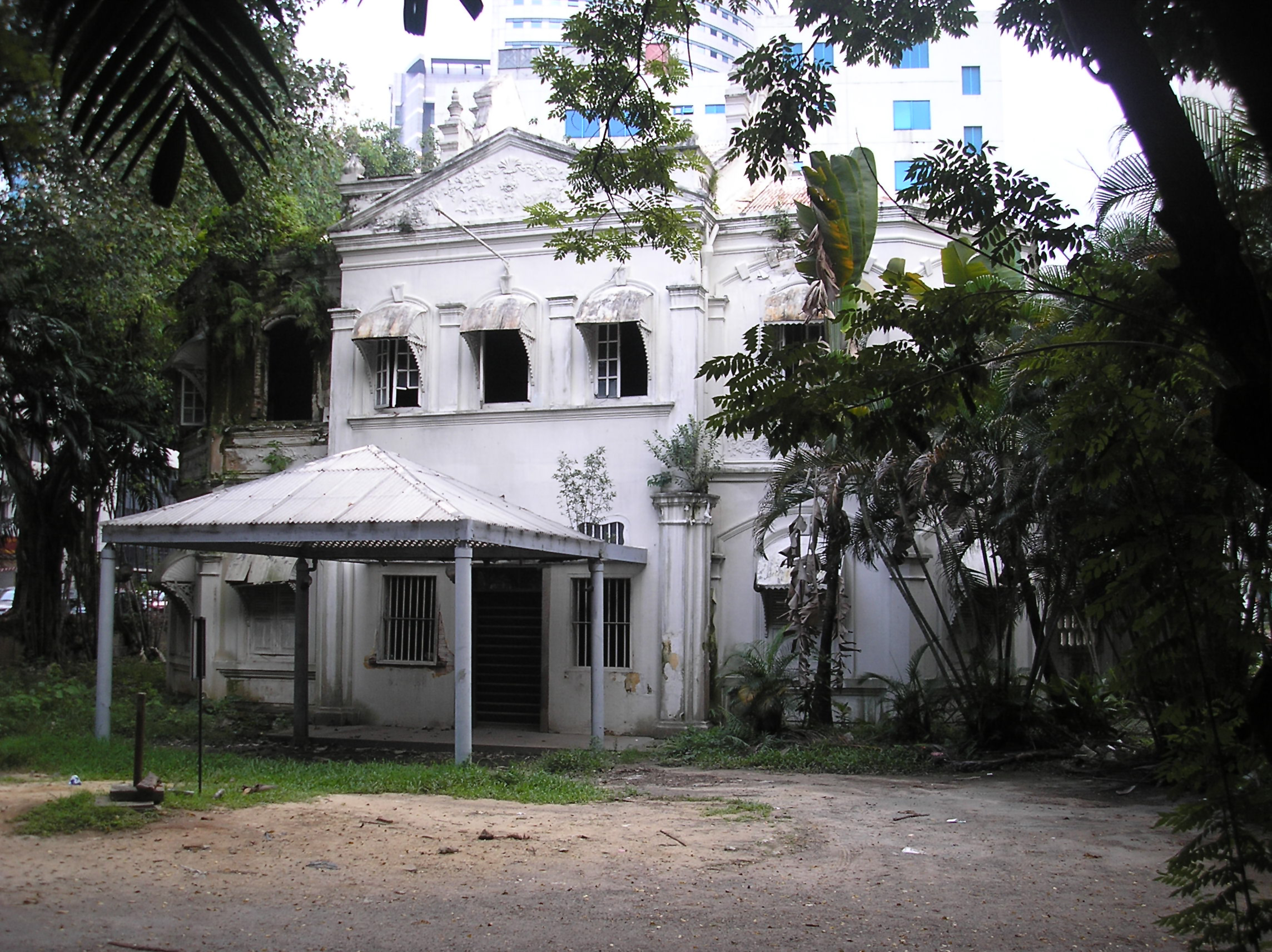
The Loke Mansion, Loke Yew's final residence in Kuala Lumpur. This is an old photograph taken before the current restoration.

Loke married four times upon the deaths of each of his prior wives. Loke did not have any children with his first wife. His second wife, Leung Jun, bore him a daughter. He also adopted a hardworking employee named Hon Chow as a son during this marriage. Hon Chow would change his surname but kept his given name. His third wife, Lim Shuk Kwei bore him a daughter, and two sons. His fourth wife, Lim Cheng Kim, whom he married in 1914, bore him three children – a son, Loke Wan Tho, and two daughters. In total the elder Loke had eight children from his four marriages, including his adopted son.

In a deviation from custom where children, biological or otherwise (and their descendants, if any), who predeceased the parent receiving nothing in inheritance and despite Loke Hon Chow predeceasing Loke Yew, Loke Yew ensured that Loke Hon Chow's male descendants bearing the Loke surname (this rule also extended to his biological children) were included in his Will. In another deviation from custom, Loke Yew also attempted to formally educate both his sons and daughters (in those days, daughters were seldom formally educated since they were married off into other clans while sons brought their wives into the clan). He sent some of his children to Robert Gordon's College in Aberdeen, Scotland, for their formal education that was unfortunately interrupted by the onset of World War I whereupon they returned home to British Malaya.

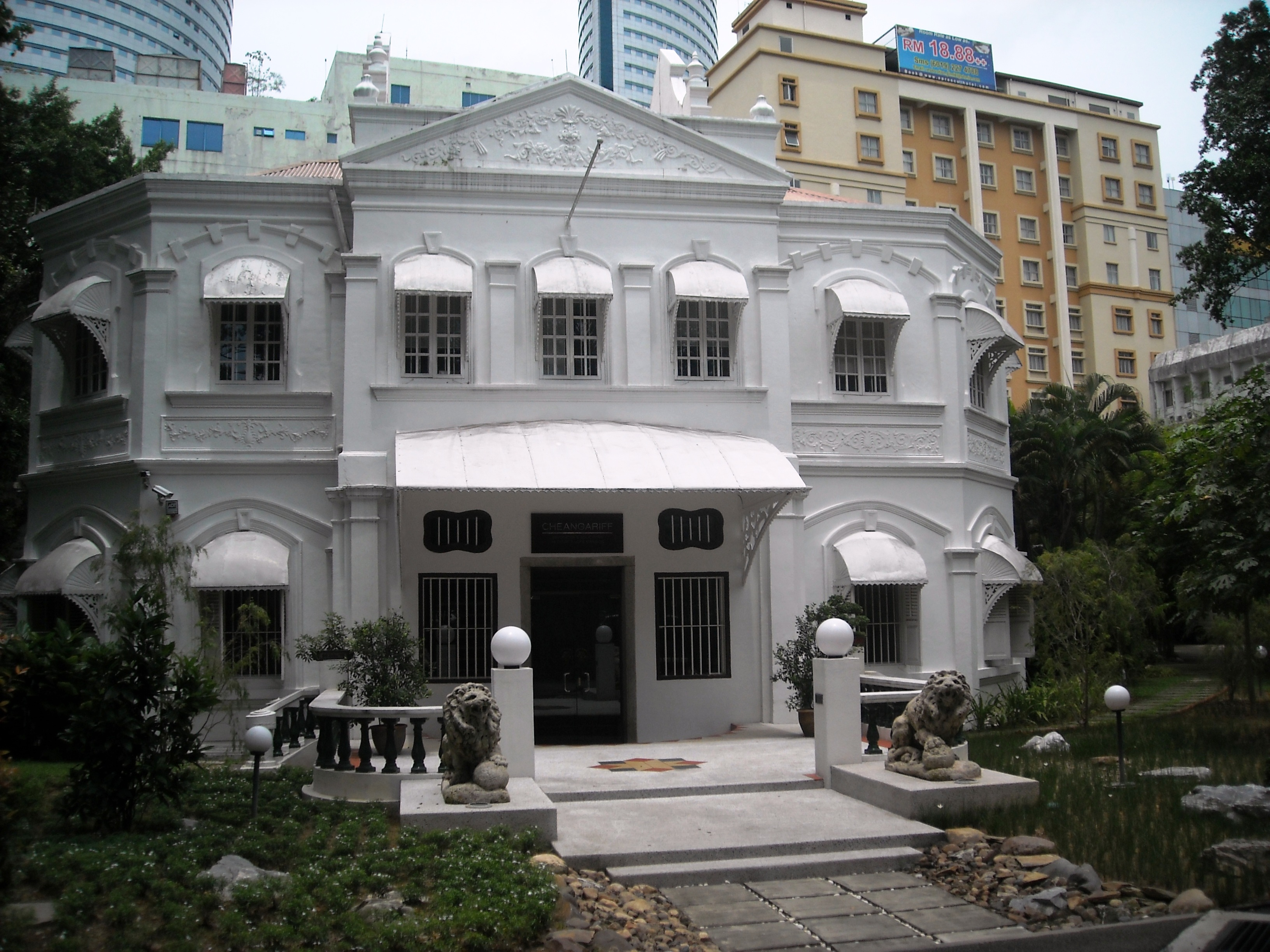
Loke Mansion after restoration

Loke Yew arrived in Kuala Lumpur in the late 1880s and stayed there for the last thirty years of his life. The Loke Mansion situated at No. 273A, Jalan Medan Tuanku, was built by Loke Yew over 12 years from 1892, the year he bought over the residence of tin miner and leader of the Cantonese community, Mr Cheow Ah Yoke. The Loke Mansion in its present form was completed in 1904 and was part of the former sprawling 11-acre (4.5 ha) Loke Estate. The Cheow home which was built between 1860 and 1862 with the famous Ching dynasty "Painted Gate" has been incorporated into the rear portion of the current Loke Mansion. Loke made sure his mansion became one of the most prestigious residences in Asia and was reputedly the first residence in Malaya to receive electricity. Loke's family lived there until the 1930s.

The Loke Mansion, accessible within walking distance from the Medan Tuanku Monorail station, was renovated and partially restored in 2006 by the law firm Cheang and Ariff, who have leased the property from its owner. Managing Partner, Dato' Loh Siew Cheang, hopes to be able to restore the mansion to its full glory in the course of time.

Loke Villa, also known as Loke Mansion, is a historical beach villa in George Town within the Malaysian state of Penang. It is located at Gurney Drive, adjacent to Gurney Paragon. It was originally built for Alan Loke Wan Wye, the son of Loke Yew. It was built between 1923 and 1924. The mansion was later bought over by Alan Loke's brother, Loke Wan Yat, and thus it became his family's residence.

Loke Wan Yat, one of his less mentioned sons, was a real estate developer and the co-owner of Penang Realty Ltd based in Penang.

== Contributions ==
Loke Yew was a canny businessman, who was excessively cautious with petty expenditure. Despite his wealth he was least expensively dressed man in his own office, owned second-hand motorcars and often went to work by rickshaw instead. There is a story that one rainy day his wife went in their car to fetch him home from their estate and found him soaking wet, with a hoe in hand showing a coolie how to dig. This showed his humility, and willingness to help others in need.

The successful businessman also strongly believed in the importance of education and was one of the founders, together with Thamboosamy Pillai, who established Victoria Institution and even donated a large sum of money to Methodist Boys' School Kuala Lumpur for them to build a field. He also donated to many charitable causes, including the establishment of the Tan Tock Seng Hospital in Singapore. His philanthropy earned him a seat on the Selangor State Council and many honours.

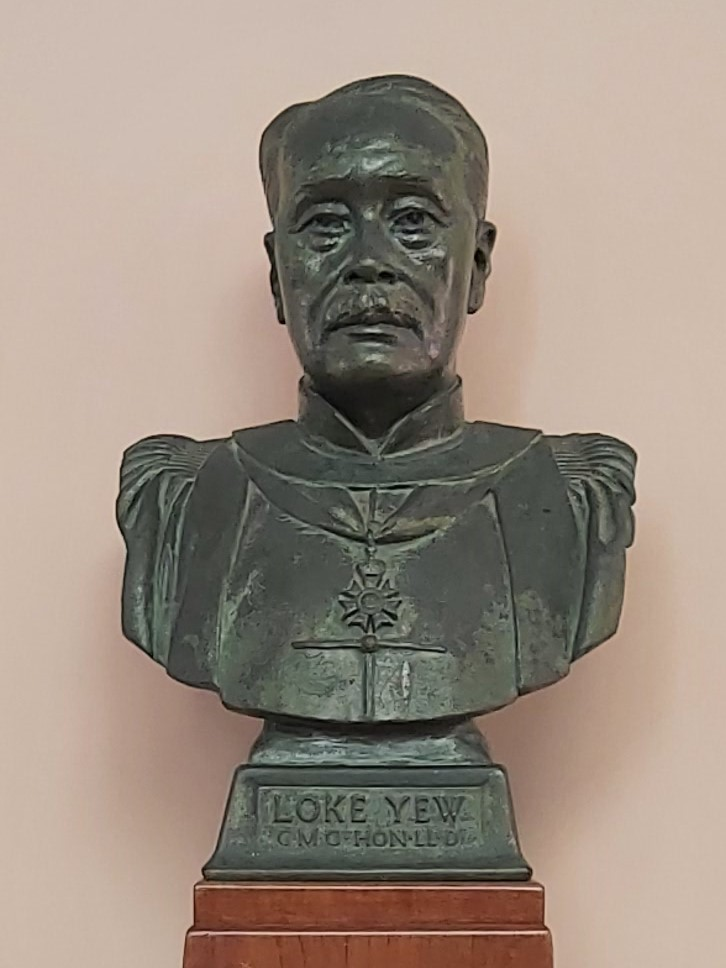
The bronze statue of Loke Yew in the Loke Yew Hall of the University of Hong Kong

Loke also helped organize the collection of $55,000 for the endowment fund in 1912 for The University of Hong Kong (HKU) and made a loan of $500,000 to the university interest-free for 25 years dating from 1915. He was the first Chinese to be awarded an honorary degree by the university, and Loke Yew Hall in HKU was subsequently named in his honour.

== Honours ==
Loke's many contributions to education and the growth of Kuala Lumpur earned him many honours. As Loke Yew was one of the pioneers of the developing Kuala Lumpur town, he was conferred the Companion of the Order of St Michael and St George (CMG) from the British Government in the 1915 New Year Honours, for his efforts and contributions on helping the people and the government of British Malaya.

Loke was also conferred an honorary Doctor of Laws (LL.D.) by the University of Hong Kong, for his generous contribution and steadfast belief in the value of education. The central Great Hall, Loke Yew Hall) was named after Loke and became a declared monument in 1984.

In tribute to the man's enormous contributions to society, the name "Loke Yew" has become identifiable with street names such as Loke Yew Street in Singapore, and Jalan Loke Yew in Kuala Lumpur and the name also appeared in several towns in Malaysia. Known as Jalan Loke Yew in Malay, this road together with Jalan Cheras makes up the Cheras Highway, built by Metramac Corporation and maintained and managed by Kuala Lumpur City Hall. It is part of the Federal Route 1 system. This road in KL is also known for its high traffic volume and congestion especially during peak hours, for its low-cost flats and the Viva Home shopping complex. (3°7′23″N 101°43′6″E). One of the Besraya Expressway's two toll plazas is named Loke Yew Toll Plaza, located just adjacent to the toll road's interchange with Jalan Loke Yew.

One of the sport houses in the Victoria Institution is named Loke Yew and is assigned the colour brown.

=== Loke Yew Professorship in Pathology ===
In the spirit of continuing education, The University of Hong Kong celebrated its Third Inauguration of Endowed Professorships on 17 April 2008, with the inception of the "Loke Yew Professorship in Pathology". This Professorship was established through the generosity of Mr Loke Yew's grandchildren, Ms Ruby Loke Yuen-Kin and Professor Charlie Loke Yung-Wai, as a testimony of the strong ties between the Hong Kong university and the Loke Family.

== Death ==
Loke Yew died on 24 February 1917 from malaria and his funeral was one of the grandest of those times. He was buried at Hawthornden Estate (a rubber estate he owned) in Setiawangsa constituency in north-eastern Kuala Lumpur, presently close to where army quarters of the Ministry of Defence are located, and a bronze statue of him was erected in front of his grave. Loke Yew also contributed to the Chinese communities in China, Hong Kong, Singapore and Taiwan. Loke Yew left an estate estimated at over £10 million a business empire composed of rubber plantations, factories and banks.

== Family graveyard ==
The Loke Yew Family Graveyard was built in 1910. The graveyard was originally located at what was known as Hawthornden Estate (3°11′1″N 101°43′57″E), and today it is surrounded by Jalan Jelatek and Jalan Semarak, near the Desa Tun Hussein Onn (a housing complex for army personnel) in Setiawangsa, Kuala Lumpur, where it is difficult for civilians to access the site. The complex consists of two buildings: The grand Tsui Lan Memorial Hall built with timber pavilions with its eclectic blend of Chinese and Western styles and the impressive larger-than-life bronze statue of Loke erected inline with his tomb. The statue was designed by Frederick J. Wilcoxson.

The tomb complex is oriented to the West, the vertical axis of Loke Yew's tomb and bronze statue are inline, while the other three tombs (Lim Shuk Kwei, Alan Loke Wan Wye and Loke Wan Tho) are slightly off with this line to its right. This is the traditional Chinese way of showing respect to the husband or father. The Loke tombs follow the traditional Fujian style of a square front courtyard with granite carved Imperial guardian lions for the purpose of "guarding" the graves. Within this courtyard, the altar itself is protected by a circular concrete fence. The Tsui Lan Memorial Hall is a rare and uncommon building, the style of which is not found elsewhere.

The complex was vandalised with its bas-relief chipped off and other damages. Loke's grandchildren maintained and repaired the complex as much as possible within the constraints of custom and the lack of skilled artisans made it harder.

== See also ==
- Lim Cheng Kim
- Cheong Yoke Choy
- Cathay Building
- Cathay Organisation
- University of Hong Kong
- Victoria Institution
