= James Taylor Rea =

Irish colonial administrator 1907–2001)

James Taylor Rea CMG
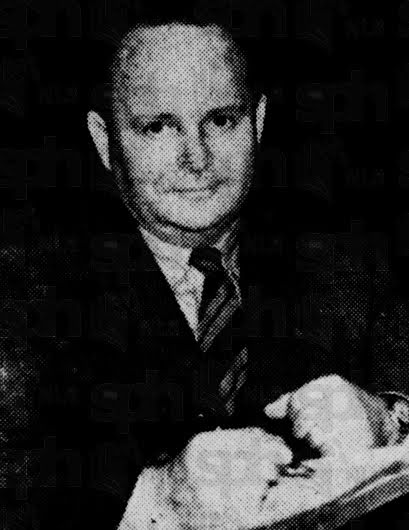
- Rea in 1954

President of Singapore City Council
- In office 1955–1958
- Preceded by: Sir Percy McNeice
- Succeeded by: Position abolished

Personal details
- Born: 19 October 1907
- Died: 23 September 2001 (aged 93)
- Children: 2
- Education: Queen's University Belfast, St John's College, Cambridge
- Occupation: Colonial administrator

James Taylor Rea (19 October 1907 – 23 September 2001) was an Irish colonial administrator and civil servant who was President of Singapore City Council from 1955 to 1958.

== Early life and education ==
Rea was born on 19 October 1907, the son of Rev Martin Rea, Presbyterian Minister, and Mary Rea (née Fisher) of Waterford, Ireland. He was educated at Royal School Dungannon; Queen's University Belfast (BA), and St John's College, Cambridge (MA).

== Career ==
Rea joined the colonial administrative service in 1931, and went to British Malaya where he served in various posts including: officer in the Chinese Protectorate, Federation of Malaya (1948); Deputy Commissioner for Labour, Federation of Malaya (1949), and Deputy Malayan Establishment Officer (1950).

In 1952, Rea transferred from the Malayan government establishment to Singapore where he held the appointment of Deputy President of Singapore City Council. While serving as acting president in 1954 he had to manage a strike by 10,000 city council workers. In 1953, he was appointed a member of the Legislative Council, and in 1955 was appointed to the substantive position of President of Singapore City Council. Intending to retire in June 1957, he agreed to a six months extension to oversee constitutional changes.

During the following year, Rea was appointed Chief Administrative Officer but after the 1958 Singapore City Council by-election, the People's Action Party led by Ong Eng Guan which controlled the council objected to his appointment because Rea was a member of the Malayan Civil Service and a government official. The last president of Singapore City Council, Rea retired in 1958.

After leaving Malaya, Rea returned to Ireland and joined the Northern Ireland Civil Service, serving in various posts including: chairman of the Hotel Grants Advisory Committee, Northern Ireland (1963–1975); member of the Headmasters' and Headmistresses' Conference (1966–1973) and as chairman (1971–1973); Eastern Health and Social Services Board (1974–1978); Northern Ireland Housing Trust (1959–1971) and as vice chairman (1970-71); Tailoring Wages Council, (1965–1982), and General Dental Council (1961–1979).

== Personal life and death ==
In 1934, Rea married an American, Catherine Bleakney whom he met in China while on a course of study in connection with his duties at the Chinese Protectorate, Perak. They had a son and a daughter. Rea was a well-regarded rugby player who played for the Selangor and Perak state teams.

Rea died on 23 September 2001, aged 93.

== Honours ==
Rea was appointed Companion of the Order of St Michael and St George (CMG) in the 1958 New Year Honours.
