= Loke Wan Tho =

Malaysian-Singaporean business magnate, ornithologist and photographer

Yang Berbahagia Tan Sri Loke Wan Tho PMN
- 陆运涛
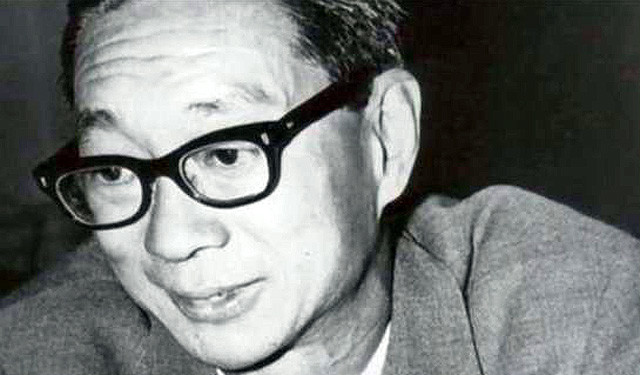
- Born: 14 June 1915; Kuala Lumpur, Selangor, Federated Malay States, British Malaya
- Died: 20 June 1964 (aged 49); Taichung, Taiwan
- Spouse(s): Kay White (m. 19??; div. 19??) Christina Lee (m. 1950; div. 1962) Mavis Chew (m. 1963; their deaths 1964)
- Parents: Loke Yew (father); Lim Cheng Kim (mother)

Loke Wan Tho

Chinese name
- Traditional Chinese: 陸運濤
- Simplified Chinese: 陆运涛
Transcriptions
Standard Mandarin
- Hanyu Pinyin: Lù Yùntáo
Hakka
- Pha̍k-fa-sṳ: Lu̍k Yun-thàu
Yue: Cantonese
- Jyutping: Luk6 Wan6 Tou4
Southern Min
- Hokkien POJ: Lio̍k Ūn-tô
- Tâi-lô: Lio̍k Ūn-tô

Tan Sri Loke Wan Tho (simplified Chinese: 陆运涛; traditional Chinese: 陸運濤; pinyin: Lù Yùntáo; Jyutping: Luk6 Wan6 Tou4; Pe̍h-ōe-jī: Lio̍k Ūn-tô; Pha̍k-fa-sṳ: Lu̍k Yun-thàu; 14 June 1915 - 20 June 1964) was a Malaysian business magnate, ornithologist, and photographer. He was the founder of Cathay Organisation in Singapore and Malaysia and the chairman of Cathay Organisation, which included Cathay Cinemas and Cathay-Keris Film Productions. He was associated with the Motion Picture and General Investments Limited (MP&GI) in Hong Kong.

== Early life and education ==
Loke was born on 14 June, 1915, in Kuala Lumpur, the ninth child of Loke Yew, an ethnic Chinese businessman of Cantonese descent, and his fourth wife Loke Cheng Kim, who was of mixed Hokkien-Hakka ancestry.

When Loke was 2 years old, Loke Yew died from malaria. Loke had his early education by a governess and then at age 12, studied at the Victoria Institution in Kuala Lumpur, a school established by the British for Chinese boys, of which his father was one of the founders.

In 1929, because of his poor health, Loke, his mother moved the family to Montreux, Switzerland where Loke studied at Chillon College. Loke would become the captain of the school soccer team and then set the 1932 long-jump record in the Swiss county of Vaud. Loke was noticed by British Olympic sprinter, Harold Abrahams, who encouraged Loke to train professionally but Loke broke his ankle and ended a possible athletics career.

Loke later attended King's College, Cambridge, where he obtained an honours degree in English Literature and History in 1936. Subsequently, for a short time, he studied at the London School of Economics before returning to Malaya shortly before the outbreak of the Second World War.

During World War II, in February 1942, Loke boarded the vessel Nora Moller, in order to leave Malaya to escape the war. While on board the Nora Moller in the Strait of Bangka, the ship was sunk by a Japanese aircraft. Lok was rescued, but suffered from temporary blindness and severe burns and evacuated to Batavia for treatment. Expecting the same fate for Indonesia, Loke left for India despite still recuperating from his injuries.

== Business career ==
Loke inherited a large fortune of tin mines, plantations, and properties from his father, and went on to grow the company which he formed together with his mother in 1935 called Associated Theatres Ltd. The Pavilion Cinema in Kuala Lumpur and the Cathay Cinema in Singapore were built.

By 1953, Loke and Ho had started the production of films at Cathay Keris Studios, which were purpose built. Loke's other studios have produced various films, such as Pontianak, Orang Minyak, Bawang Puteh Bawang Merah, Hang Tuah, and Hang Jebat.

Loke also bought a Hong Kong film studio in 1955 and started to produce a library of Chinese films to supply to his chain of cinemas which stretched from Singapore to Bangkok. The films were also distributed to the region and Cathay stars like Ge Lan, You Min, Lin Dai, and Yeh Fung. The films became household names in Indochina, Thailand, Burma, Hong Kong, Taiwan, Philippines, Indonesia, Brunei, Sarawak, Borneo, as well as Singapore and Malaya.

Partnerships were forged with other filmmakers such as Ho Ah Loke to form the Cathay cinema circuit, which counted 80 cinemas at its peak. Associated Theatres Ltd. later changed its name to Cathay Organisation in 1959.

The Cathay Organisation, of which Loke was chairman, owned and operated cinemas and film studios, produced Malay and Chinese films, and owned and operated hotels and restaurants. (The Cathay Hotel, Ocean Park Hotel, and their attendant restaurants in Singapore; and Grand Pacific Hotel and The Cathay Hotel Lautoka in Fiji.)

Loke also had interests in rubber, palm oil, and coconut plantations in Malaysia.

From the end of the war, Loke had become increasingly involved in the business world. Besides his own companies, he was Chairman of Malayan Airways Ltd, Singapore Telephone Board, Malayan Banking; and was among the board of directors at Wearne Brothers, Sime Darby, Kwong Yik Bank, Great Eastern Life, H.A. O'Connor's Ltd, Straits Steamship Co. Ltd, and Rediffusion Singapore Ltd.

In his lifetime, Loke was honored by the state of Kelantan in Malaysia, from which he received his Datoship.

== Personal life ==
In 1950, Loke married his second wife, Christina Lee. They divorced in 1962.

In September 1963, Loke married his third wife, Mavis Chew, in London.

In 1942, after arriving in Bombay from evacuating from Indonesia, Loke was introduced to the Indian ornithologist Salim Ali, who eventually became a lifelong friend and a frequent companion on many major expeditions. Loke credited Salim with inspiring his passion and wrote in his book A Company of Birds: "Under the guidance of an expert (Salim Ali) my interest in birds which hitherto had been but of a dilettante kind blossomed into a deeper passion."

== Death ==
On 20 June 1964, Loke and his wife were killed in the crash of Civil Air Transport Flight 106, along with his chief executives, leaving Taichung after attending the 11th Asian Film Festival.

== Legacy ==
In 2008, Bombay Natural History Society, published the book Loke Wan Tho's Birds. A large collection of his bird photographs is kept in the library of the Bombay Natural History Society at Mumbai.

On 15 November 1996, the Selegie Arts Centre was opened with an art gallery, Loke Wan Tho Gallery, dedicated to Loke.

== Honours ==
=== Honour of Malaya ===
- Malaya
  - Commander of the Order of the Defender of the Realm (PMN) – Tan Sri (1961)

== Memorials ==
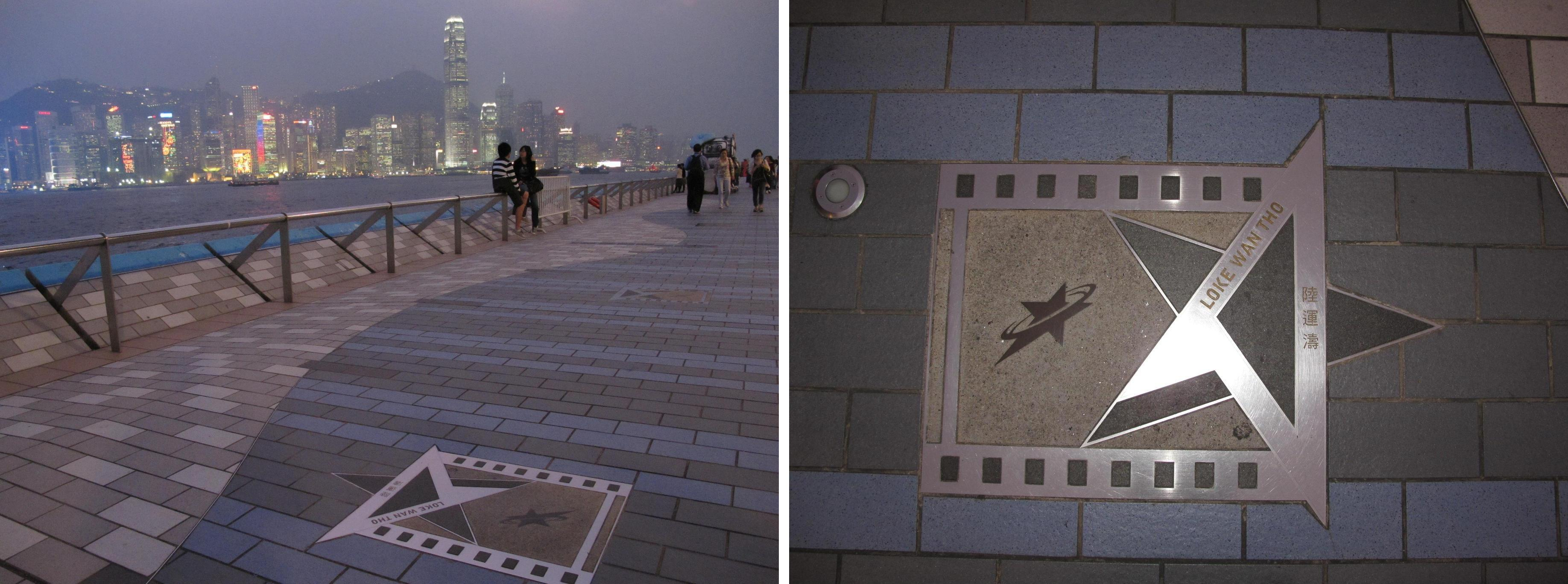
Loke Wan Tho memorial, Avenue of Stars, Hong Kong

- Loke Wan Tho Photography Exhibit is housed on 3rd floor of Singapore Photography Society
- Loke Wan Tho Library in Singapore Jurong Bird Park
- Wan Tho Avenue in Potong Pasir, Singapore
- Loke Wan Tho Star, No. 38 Avenue of Stars, Hong Kong
- Museum open to the public housed on 2nd floor of The Cathay

== Publications ==
- A Company of Birds. Michael Joseph, London 1959
- Angkor, by Malcolm MacDonald and Loke Wan Tho, Jonathan Cape, London, 1958,59,60.
- Text by Malcolm MacDonald, with chapters including "The History of Khmers"。"The Ruins of Khmers"。 111 Black and White Plates of Angkor Wat, taken by Loke Wan Tho and M.MacDonald。
