= The Cathay =

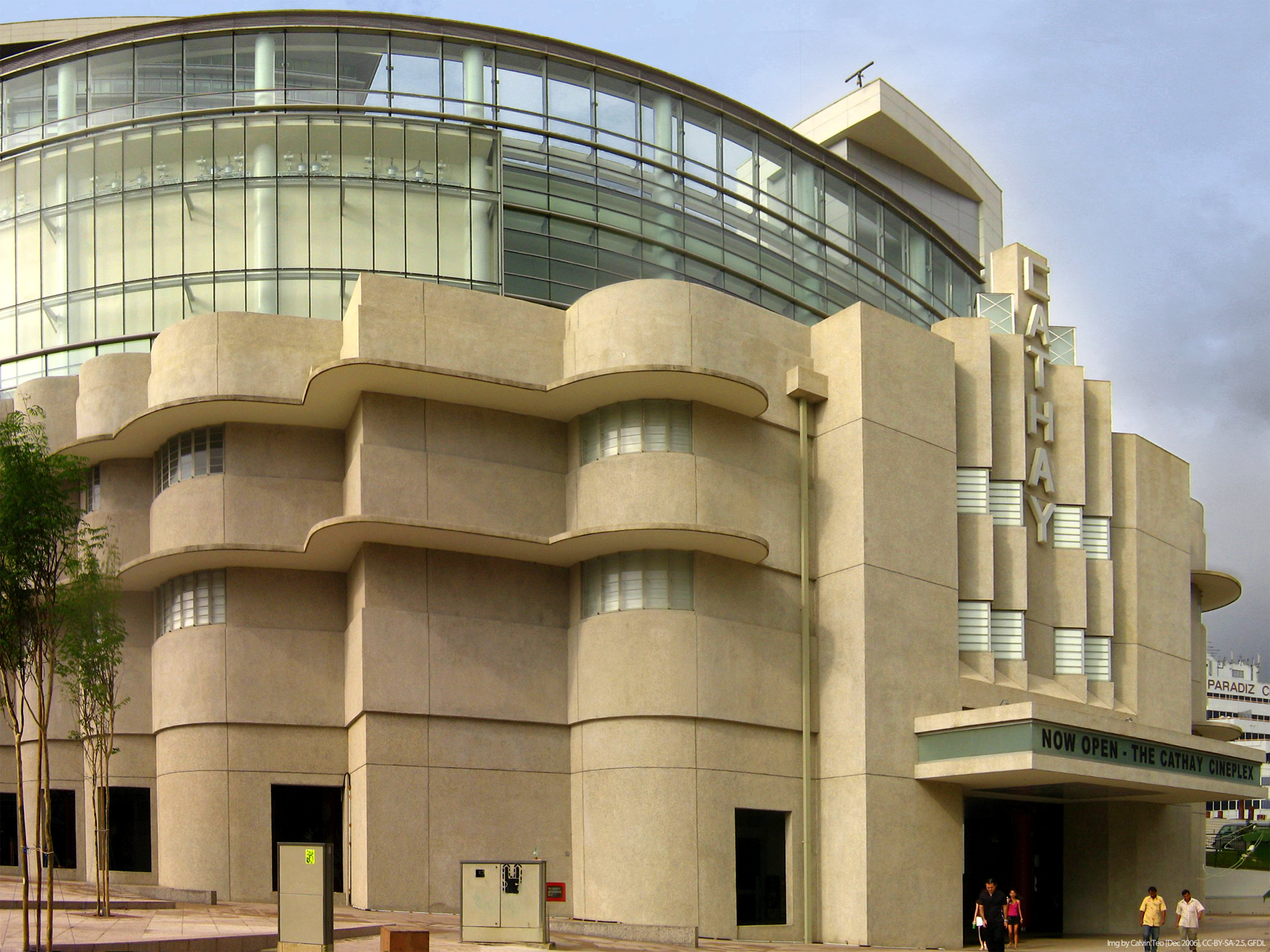
- The new Cathay Building was constructed behind the Art Deco frontal facade of the old Cathay Cinema, which was gazetted as a national monument.
- Location: Museum Planning Area, Singapore
- Coordinates: 1°17′57.5″N 103°50′51.5″E
- Address: 2 Handy Road, Singapore 229233 (retail podium); 30 Mount Sophia, Singapore 228464 (residential tower)
- Opened: 24 March 2006 (original opening); 28 March 2025 (soft reopening); 15 August 2025 (grand reopening)
- Developer: Cathay Organisation
- Manager: Cathay Organisation
- Owner: Cathay Organisation
- Floor area: 168,000 sq ft (15,600 m^{2})
- Floors: 17
- Website: The Cathay

The Cathay is a mixed-use 17-story shopping mall and apartment building located at Handy Road and Mount Sophia in the Museum Planning Area of Singapore.

== History ==
Owned and managed by Cathay Organisation, the original building was opened in 1939 as Cathay Building. In 2000, it was closed and partially demolished for redevelopment. Elements of the old Cathay Cinema, including its façade which was conserved as a national monument, together with a modern-day design by Paul Tange of Tange Associates Japan and RDC Architects Pte Ltd Singapore, were incorporated into the new building.

Opened in March 2006, the Cathay Building housed retail, food and beverage outlets and an eight-screen The Cathay Cineplex, comprising The Grand Cathay, a 590-seat hall, The Picturehouse, an intimate 82-seat hall that screens art films and six regular halls with a total of 1,846 seats. In late 2006, the 76-unit The Cathay Residences located above the mall was completed. The Picturehouse was then subsequently converted into Cathay's first premium hall concept, Platinum Movie Suites, in 2011.

In June 2022, The Cathay Cineplex was shuttered after 83 years, and four of the halls including The Grand Cathay and Platinum Movie Suites were taken over as a pop-up cinema by The Projector, Projector X Picturehouse. The mall was then subsequently closed in August the following year for a revamp and reopened in March 2025 with a refreshed tenant mix, a reconfigured interior layout, a sky garden at Level 4 and an enlarged atrium with a 3-floor multimedia display spanning the lower floors.

The cinemas were gutted and repurposed, such as the entirety of Level 5 and half of Level 6 taken up by PSB Academy for their Coventry University and foundation courses respectively, while the entrance lobby of The Cathay Residences at Adis Road was integrated into Level 6 of the mall, improving accessibility for residents living at Mount Sophia and Mount Emily. Other tenants include Sheng Siong's first supermarket in Orchard Road, the NTU Alumni Association's clubhouse, Iuiga's largest flagship store in South East Asia, 24-hour gym 24x7 Fitness, a Thermomix concept store, e-sports venue Elxir E-Sports and Thai golf brand Leonian.

== Gallery ==
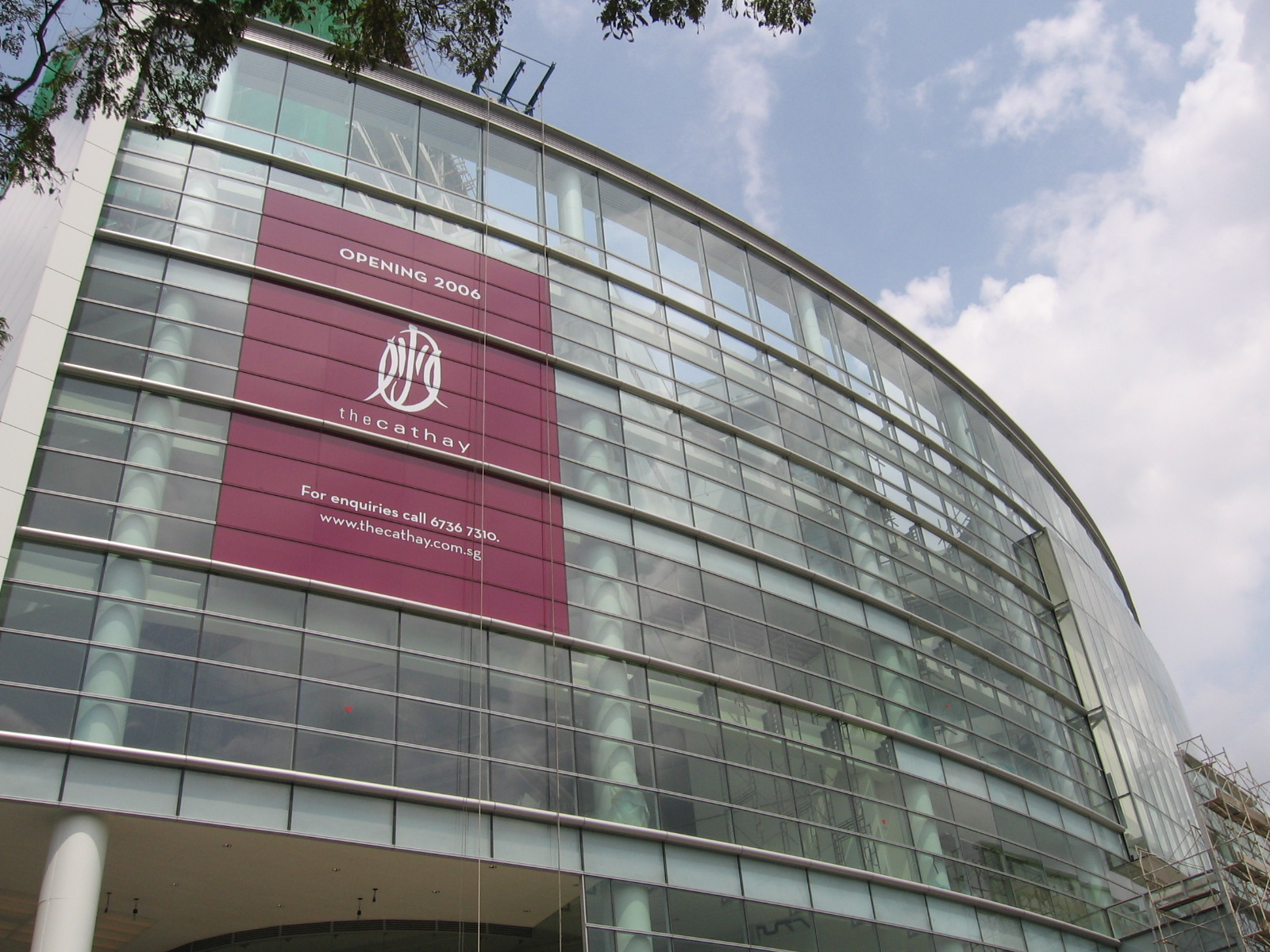
The glass panels of the pre-opening of The Cathay building

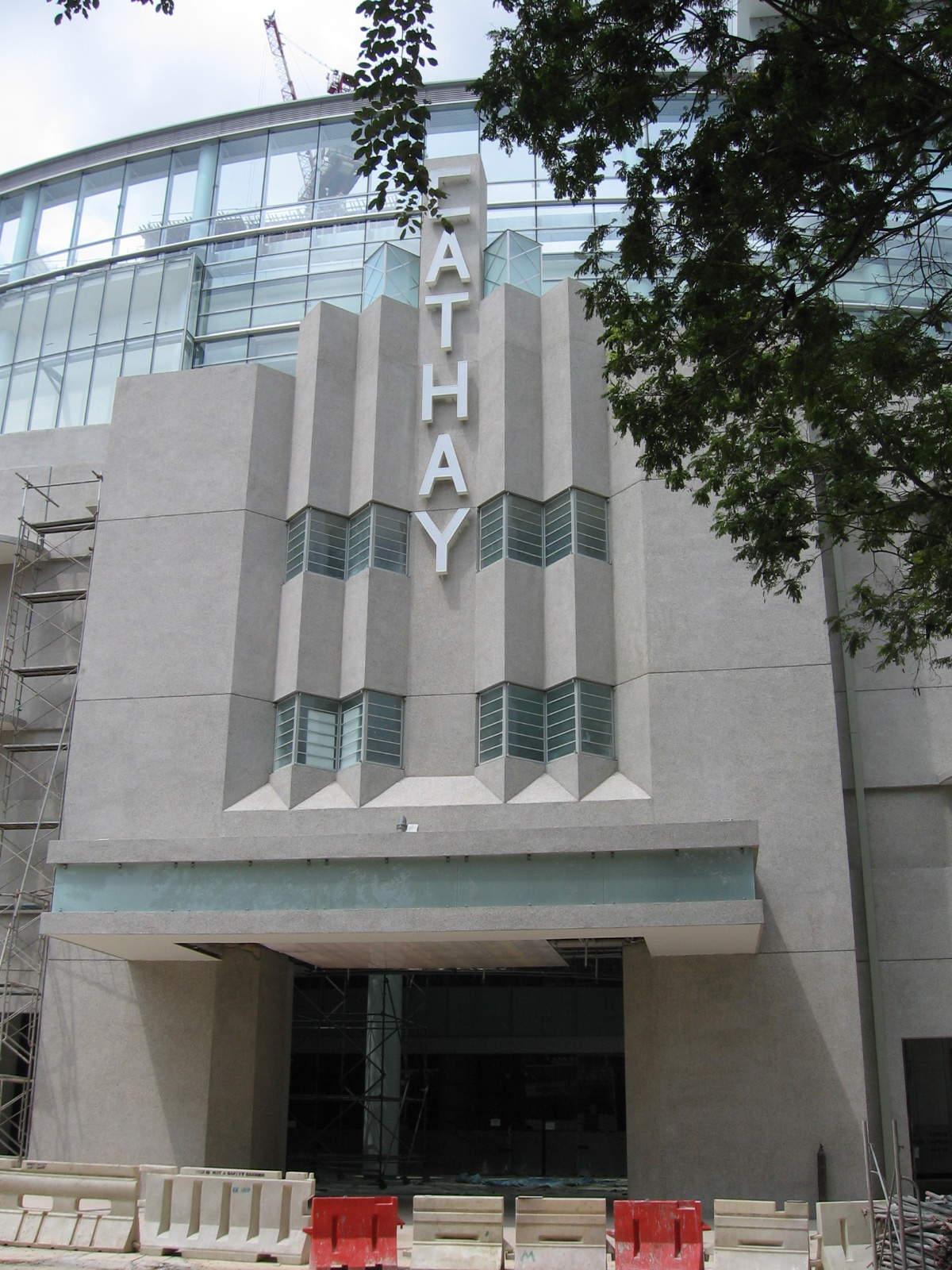
The Cathay

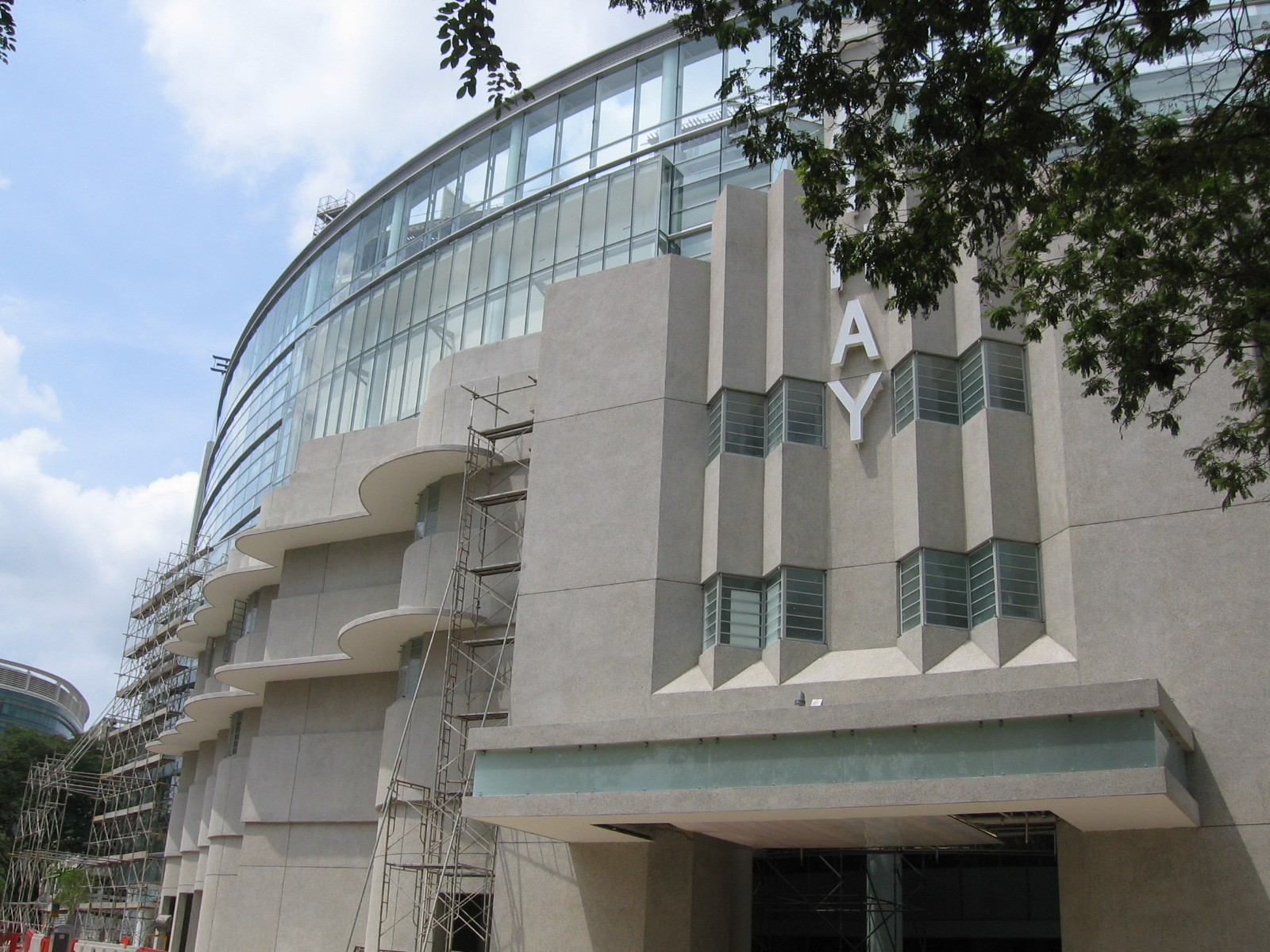
The Cathay

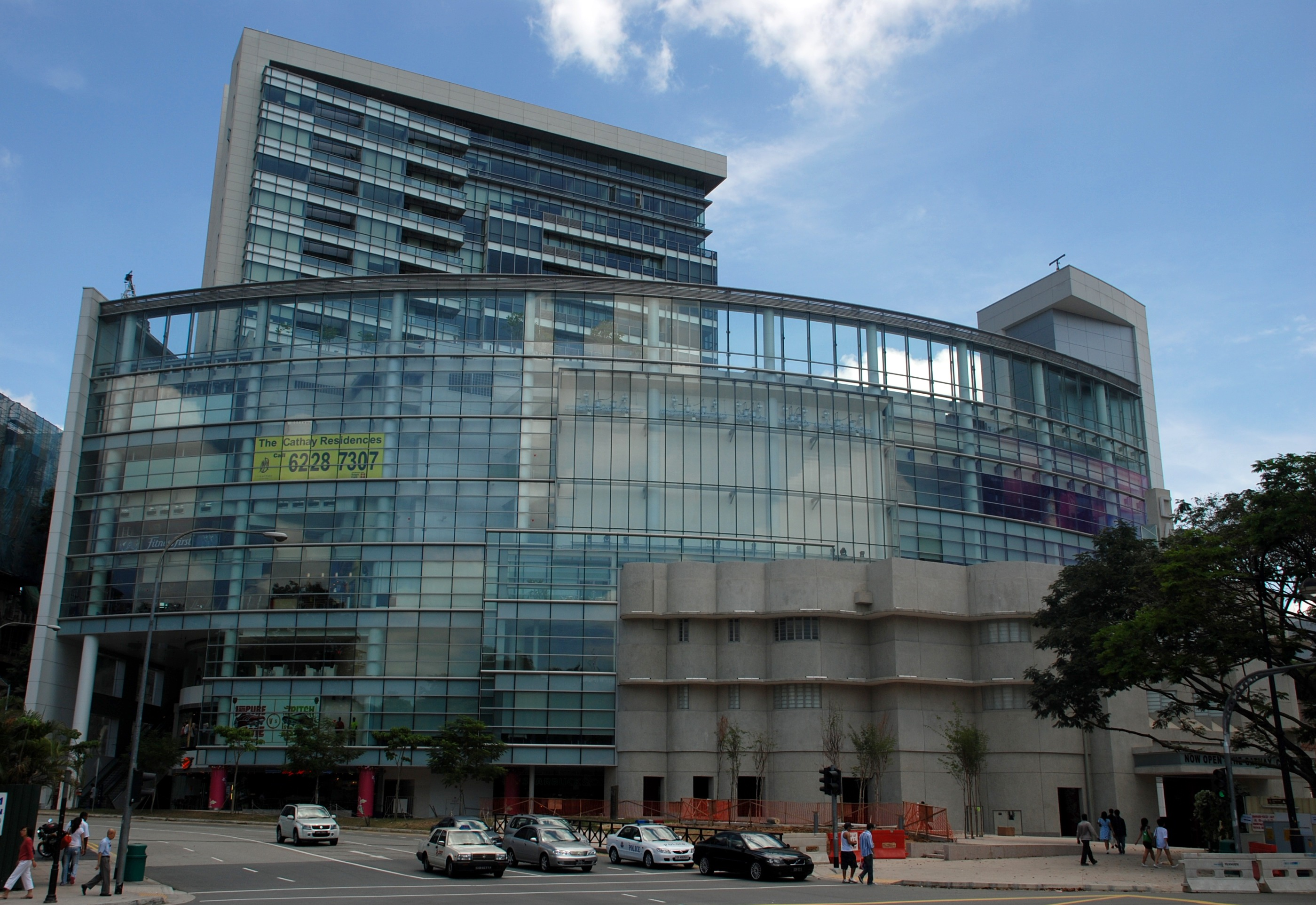
The Cathay

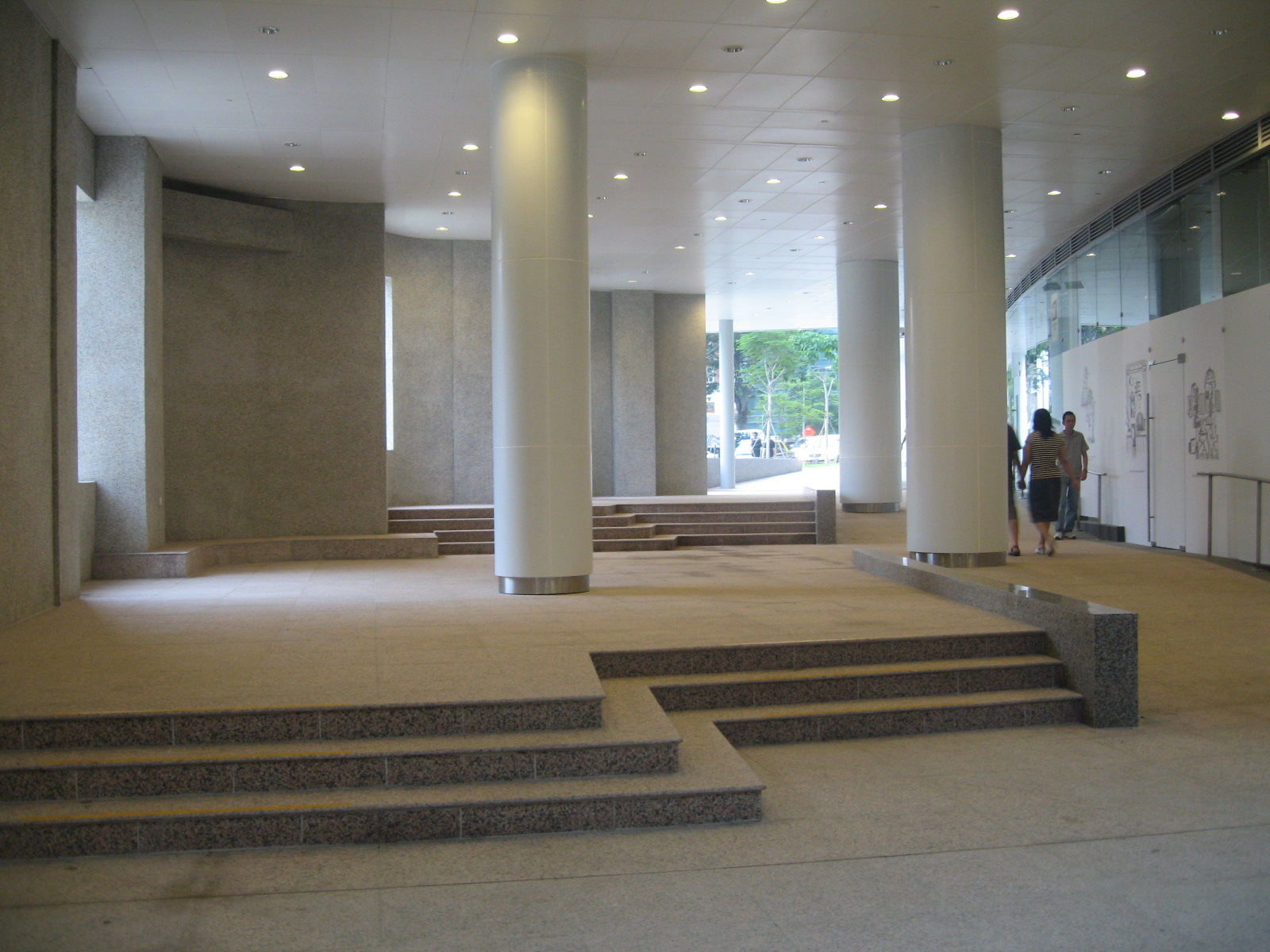
The Cathay

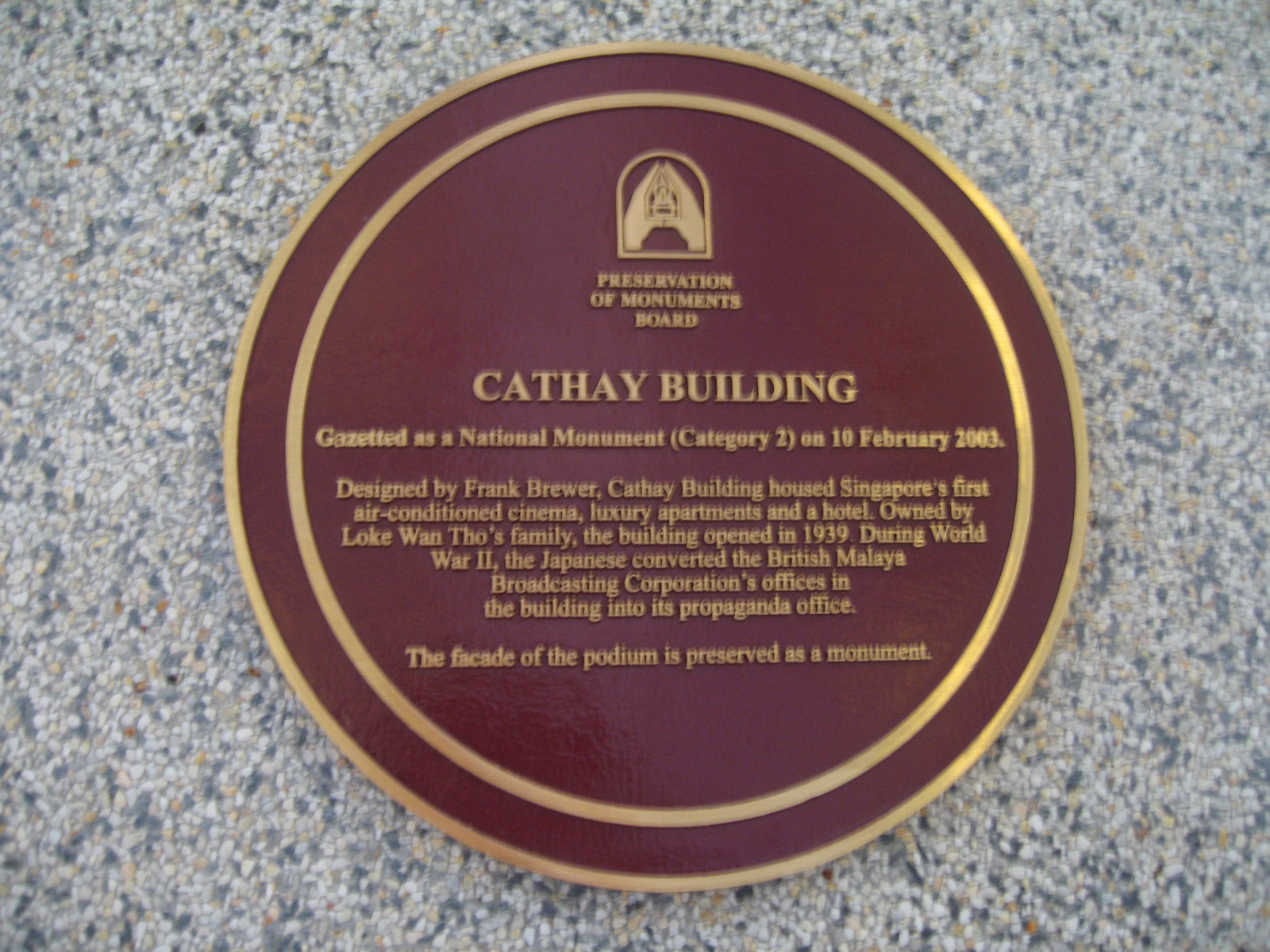
The Cathay

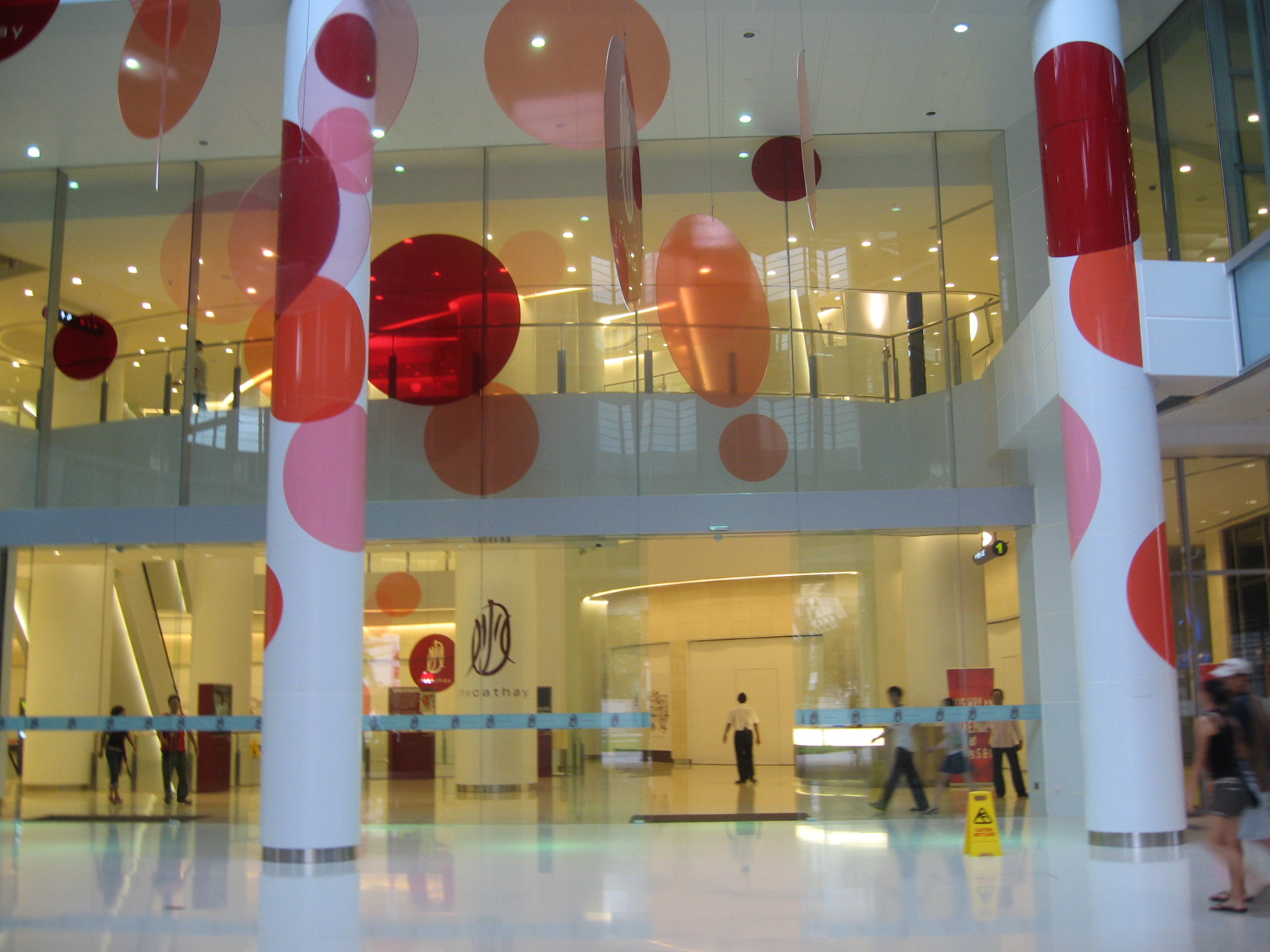
The Cathay

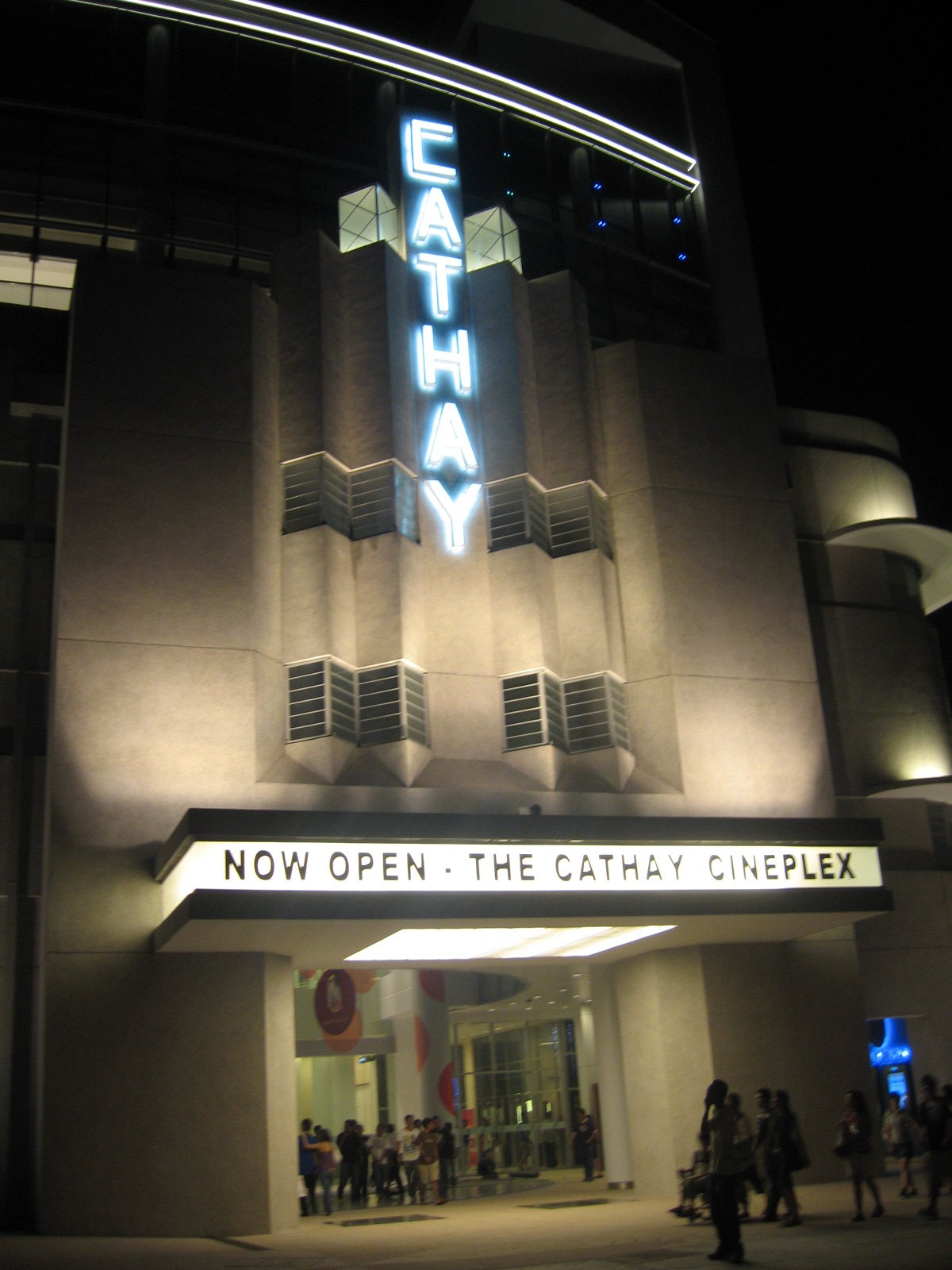
The Cathay

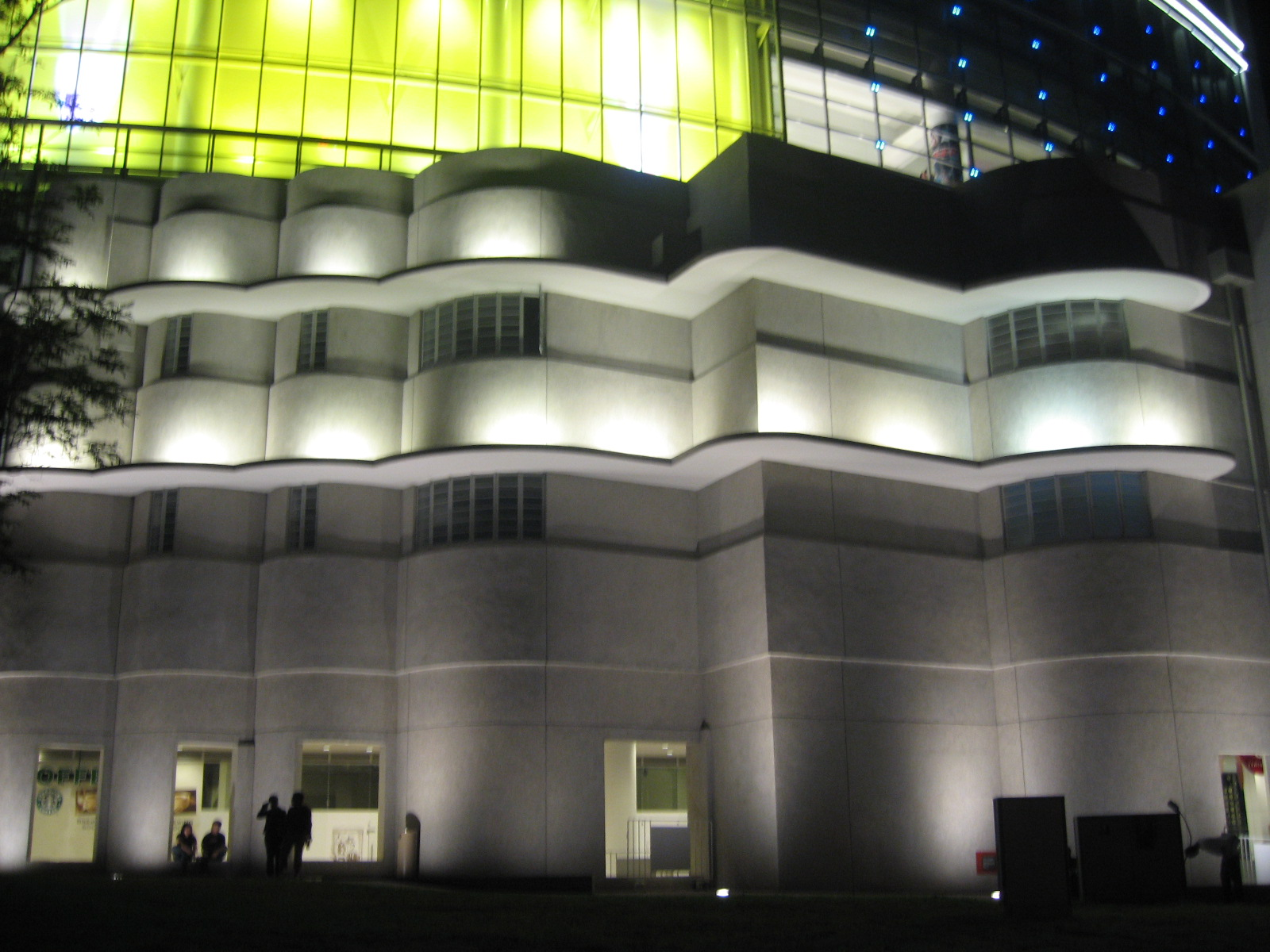
The Cathay

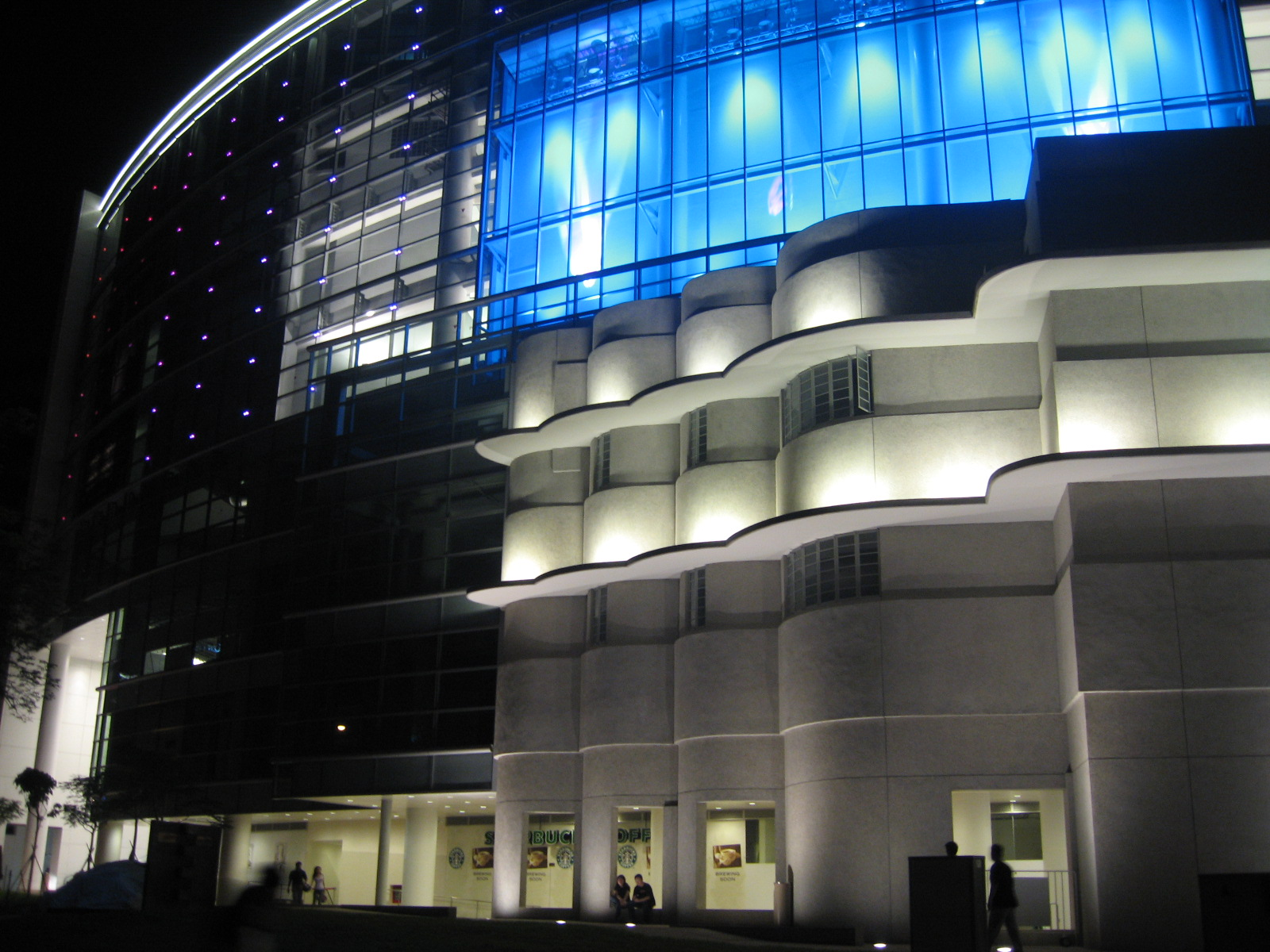
The Cathay

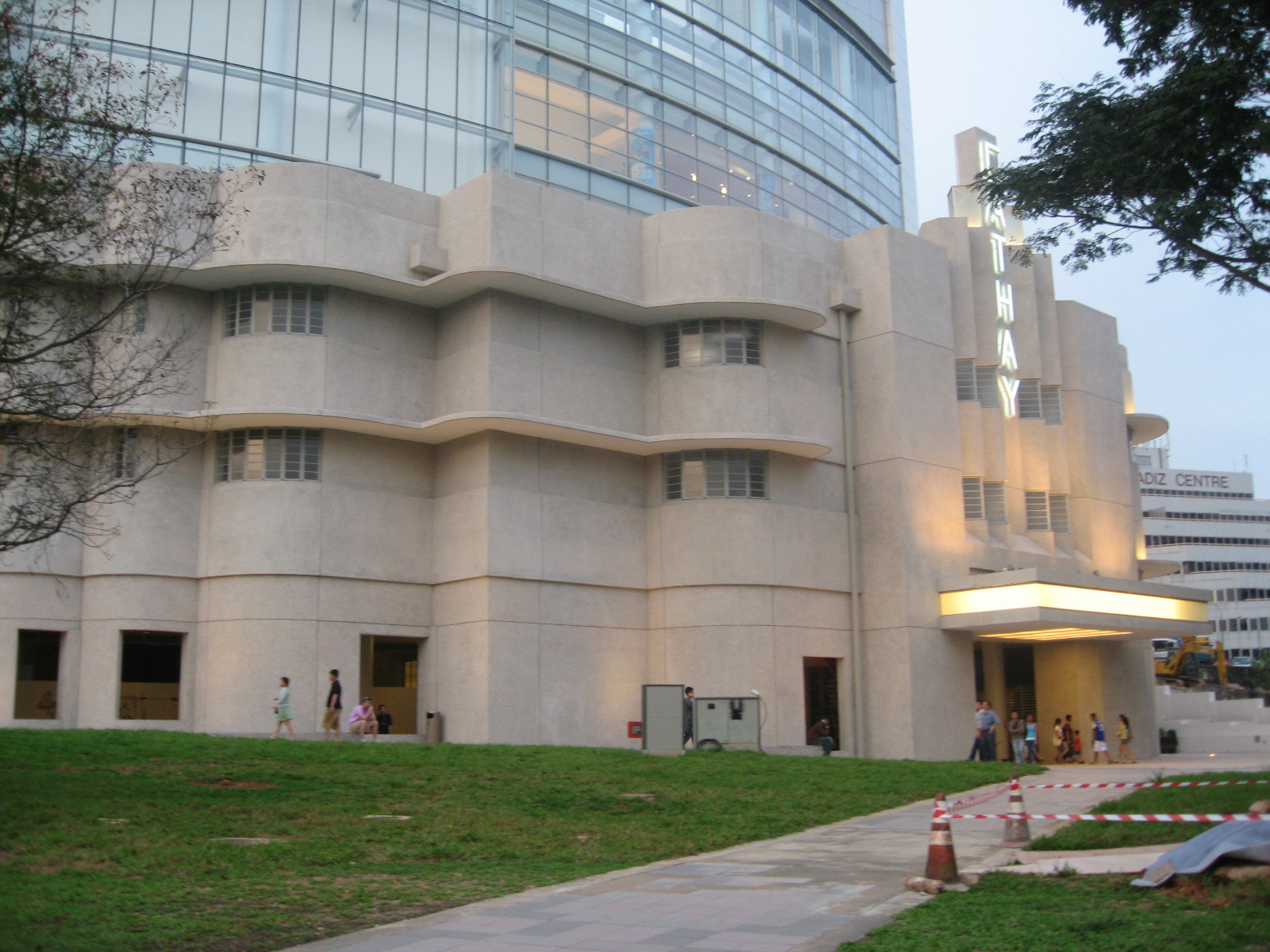
The Cathay

== See also ==
- List of shopping malls in Singapore
- Façadism
