= Ruby Theatre (Singapore) =

Theatre located in Balestier, Singapore

Coordinates: 1.3227°N 103.8497°E

Ruby Theatre, also known as the Ruby Cinema, was a theatre located along Balestier Road in Balestier, Singapore.

== History ==
The theatre first opened on 17 September 1958, along Balestier Road in Balestier, and was owned by the Cathay Organisation. The theatre was popular in the 1970s, with tickets for some performances being completely sold out. Due to this, a policy was implemented where only four tickets could be bought at a time.

The theatre offer was given to Golden Wall Realty in 1980, in which a new complex would be built on the site of the theatre, with a new cinema, which was to be handed back to Cathay Theatres. The offer was accepted, and the theatre later closed and was demolished in 1980, later being replaced by Balestier Point in 1986.
