= Balestier Point =

High-rise building in Singapore

Coordinates: 1.3227°N 103.8497°E

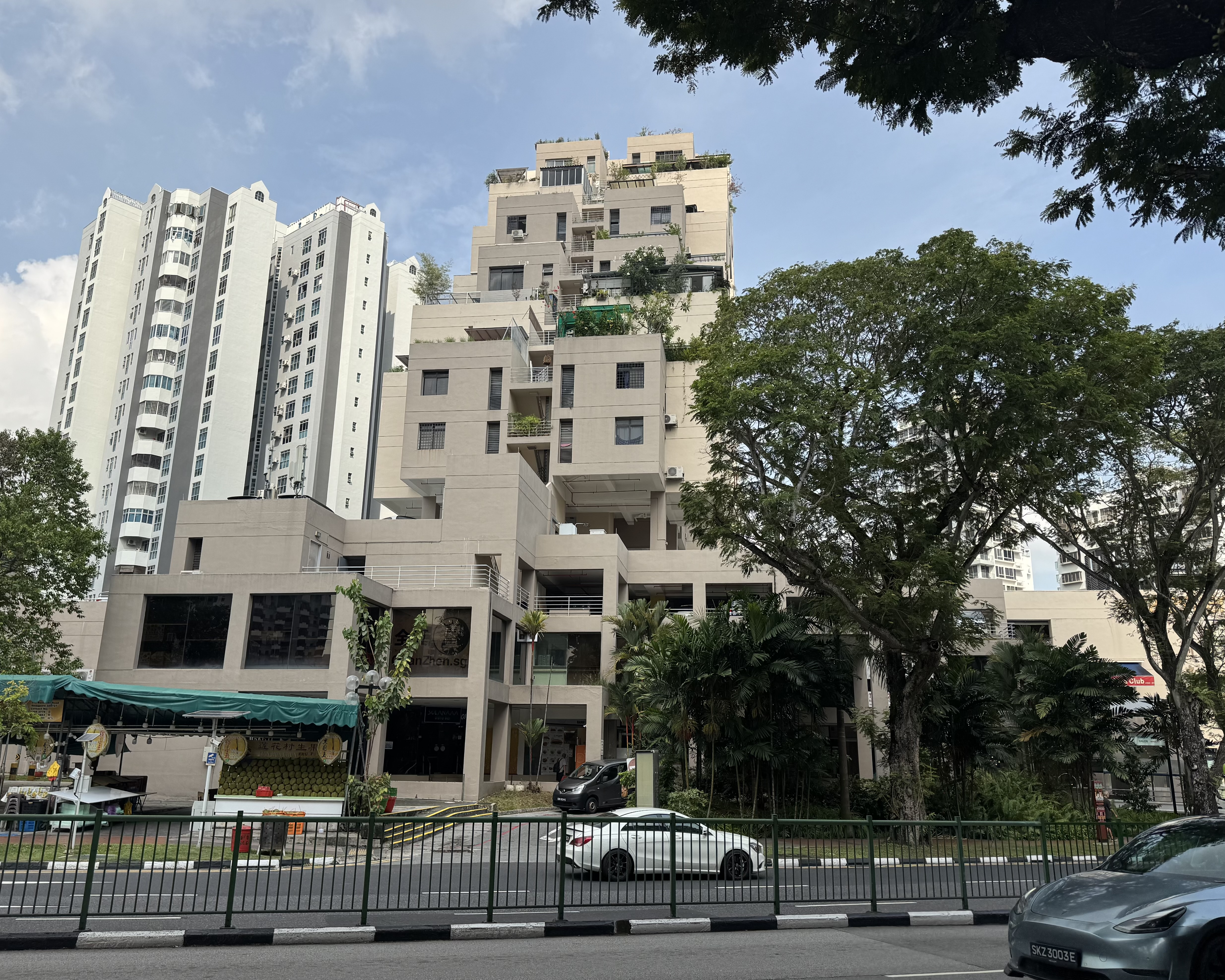
Balestier Point viewed from across Balestier Road in 2026.

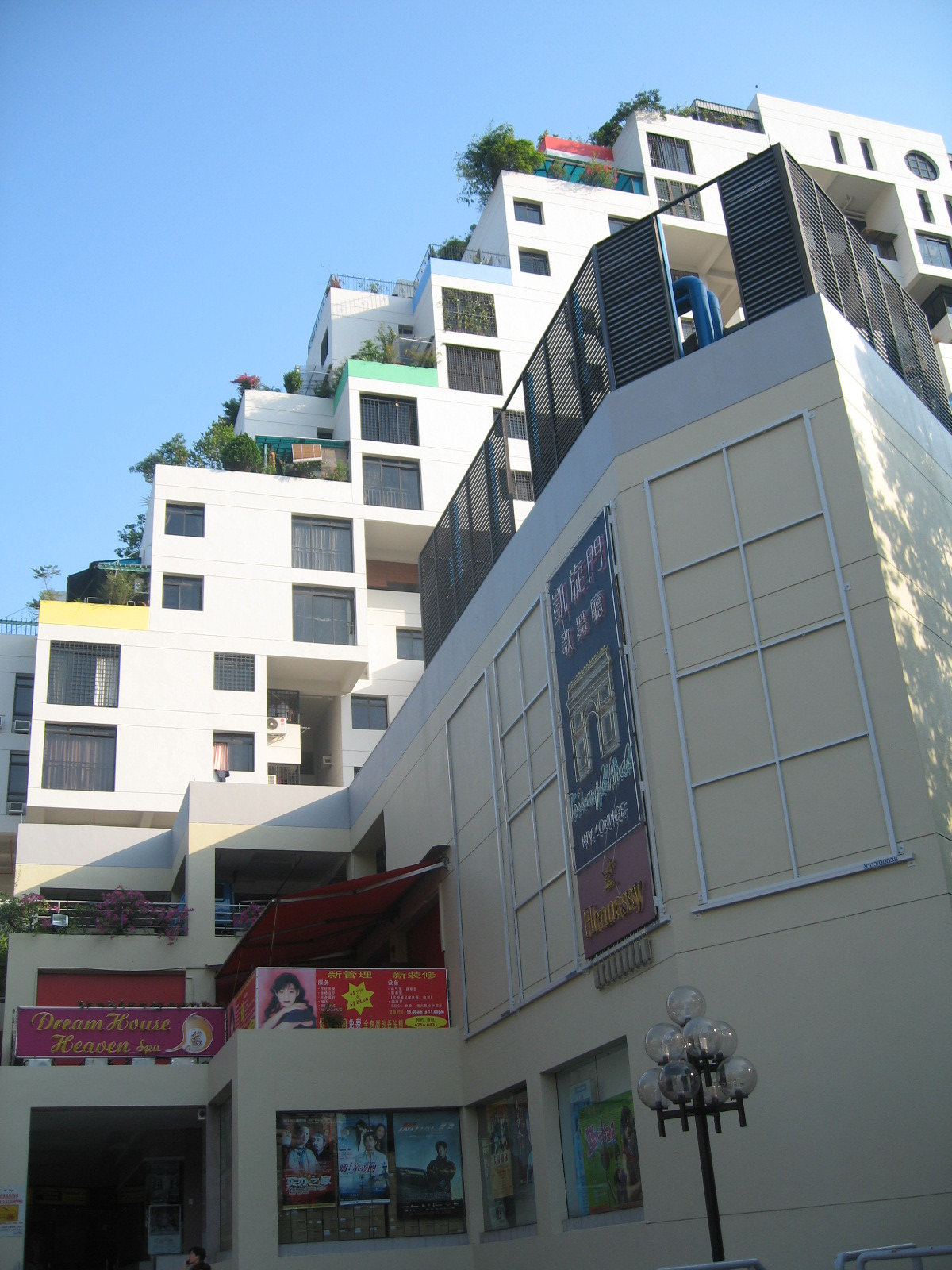
The left side of Balestier Point

Balestier Point is a high-rise mixed-use development in Balestier, Singapore with retail outlets on the lower floors, and residential units in the upper floors.

== History ==
Completed in 1986, Balestier Point, designed by architect Chan Fook Pong and constructed by architectural firm Regional Development Consortium, was one of the first high-rise buildings along Balestier Road. The building was originally known as the Central Plaza Complex and was inspired by Habitat 67. The building was built on the former site of the Ruby Theatre. The first two floors of the building are occupied by commercial shop units, followed by two floors of carparks, and thirteen floors of residential units. The building also has a KTV lounge. The building resembles blocks stacked on top of one another, and gained an honourable mention award from the Singapore Institute of Architects in 1986. The building's unique design also made it a local landmark.

The building was included in the Balestier Heritage Trail. In 2020, eleven freehold commercial units in the building went up for sale at $65 million.
