= Jurong Drive-in =

Open-air drive-in theatre in Singapore

Coordinates: 1°19′49″N 103°43′32″E

- Former location in Singapore
- Address: 8 Yuan Ching Road, Singapore 618658
- Location: Singapore
- Owner: Cathay Organisation
- Type: drive-in theater
- Acreage: 5.6 hectares (56,000 m^{2})

Construction
- Opened: 14 July 1971; 55 years ago
- Closed: 30 September 1985; 40 years ago

Jurong Drive-in was the only open-air drive-in theatre in Singapore. Opened in 1971, the cinema initially saw high rates of attendance. However, its popularity dwindled significantly by the early 1980s, and it was closed in 1985.

== History ==
Constructed next to Yuan Ching Road in Jurong for the Cathay Organisation on an estimated cost of $3 million, the Jurong Drive-in was inspired by the O'Halloran Hill Drive-in (1966 –1984) in Adelaide, South Australia. The cinema had a capacity of 900 cars and featured a sheltered viewing gallery situated in front of the screen which could seat 308 people. It occupied a site with an area of 5.6 hectares leased from the Jurong Town Corporation, making it the largest drive-in in Asia at the time. It also featured a projector with a range of 83.8 m and a 14.3 m by 33.5 m screen suspended 7.6 m above the ground and tilted by 6.5 degrees to allow for better viewing from within a car.

Jurong Drive-in was opened by the then Minister of Culture, Jek Yeun Thong, on 14 July 1971. It was the first drive-in in Singapore. On the opening night, the cinema screened the 1970 British comedy film Doctor in Trouble. During which the theatre was filled with around 880 cars, with an additional 300 patrons occupying the viewing gallery. Tickets were priced at $30 per car with a maximum of five passengers. Reserved lots cost an additional $20.

Earnings from the screening, an estimated $20,000, were donated to Jurong Town Creche and Jurong Town Community Centre.

During screenings, ice cream and cold drinks vendors would travel around the drive-in. There was also an air-conditioned cafeteria and a playground for children. Tickets initially cost $2 for adults and $1 for children, although this was raised in 1978 to $2.50 for adults and $1.50 for children.

The theatre held two screenings every night, with the first at 7 pm and the second at 9.30 pm. Those who had arrived early for the second screening could wait in a holding area with a capacity of 300 cars. The theatre typically screened English-language films from the United Kingdom and the United States, as well as action films from Hong Kong. Bruce Lee films were very popular, with a 1971 screening of The Big Boss, which featured Lee in his first lead role in a major film, earning $12,000 through ticket sales, breaking the theatre's box office record.

The theatre's popularity began waning in the late 1970s and the early 1980s. The novelty of the concept had worn off and the cinema suffered from poor weather conditions, gate-crashers, a poor sound system, video piracy and an unruly audience. Additionally, motorcyclists would illegally race around the theatre's site, disturbing both filmgoers and nearby residents through noise and air pollution. Its location was rather "out of the way" and many new cinemas were being built across Singapore. It also faced heavy competition from the rise of both television and video and struggled to attract younger adults as many of them did not drive cars. In an unsuccessful attempt to attract more patrons, Cathay began giving gifts to children attending screenings of Disney films, lowering the prices of tickets and screening first-run English-language films in the late 1970s. Although the organisation began considering closing down the theatre in 1980, it was decided that it would remain open until the land lease with Jurong Town Corporation expired in 1985.

In the theatre's last few years of operation, only roughly 200 people or 100 cars would attend on average per screening. The drive-in was closed following its last screening on 30 September 1985. The drive-in was replaced by the Fairway Country Club, which would later be demolished in the mid 2010s. The former site of the theatre, which is currently occupied by the ActiveSG Park section of the Jurong Lake Gardens, has been placed on the Jurong Heritage Trail by the National Heritage Board.
