= Selegie Arts Centre =

Singapore arts building

Coordinates: 1.3001°N 103.8476°E

Selegie Arts Centre is an "arts home" on 30 Selegie Road in Singapore. It houses the Photographic Society of Singapore.

== History ==
The building was originally an Indian coffee-shop with residential units located on the upper floors. The building was gazetted for conservation in October 1994 and was acquired by the National Arts Council under the Arts Housing Scheme to house the Photographic Society of Singapore. The arts centre was opened on 15 November 1996, with an art gallery named Loke Wan Tho Gallery after a former vice president Loke Wan Tho.
