= Viva Home =

Shopping mall in Kuala Lumpur, Malaysia

Viva Home is a shopping centre located along Jalan Loke Yew in the city of Kuala Lumpur, Malaysia. First opened in 1996 as Plaza UE3, it suffered a decline period and later was refurbished as Viva Home.

== As Plaza UE3 ==
Plaza UE3 or Plaza Uncang Emas was constructed in 1995 and opened sometime around January 1996. It had Xtra Supercenter as its anchor tenant. Plaza UE3 featured an elevator shaft topped by a clock tower. Xtra Supercenter suddenly wound up in early 2000 and marked the beginning of the decline period of the complex. Many shops were closed. Only a few managed to survive.

In late 2003, the complex was acquired by Danaharta and Hai-O Group. The complex was refurbished as MCC City (Malaysia-China Commerce). An influx of shops selling Chinese goods i.e. antiques, books, stationery, furniture and traditional Chinese medicine revived the complex, but not for long. A supermarket known as D-Choice Supermarket opened in the former premises of Xtra Supercenter. The supermarket closed in early 2007. The Chinese shops also begin to shut one-by-one. As of 2009, the complex is considered basically 'dead'.

== Gallery ==
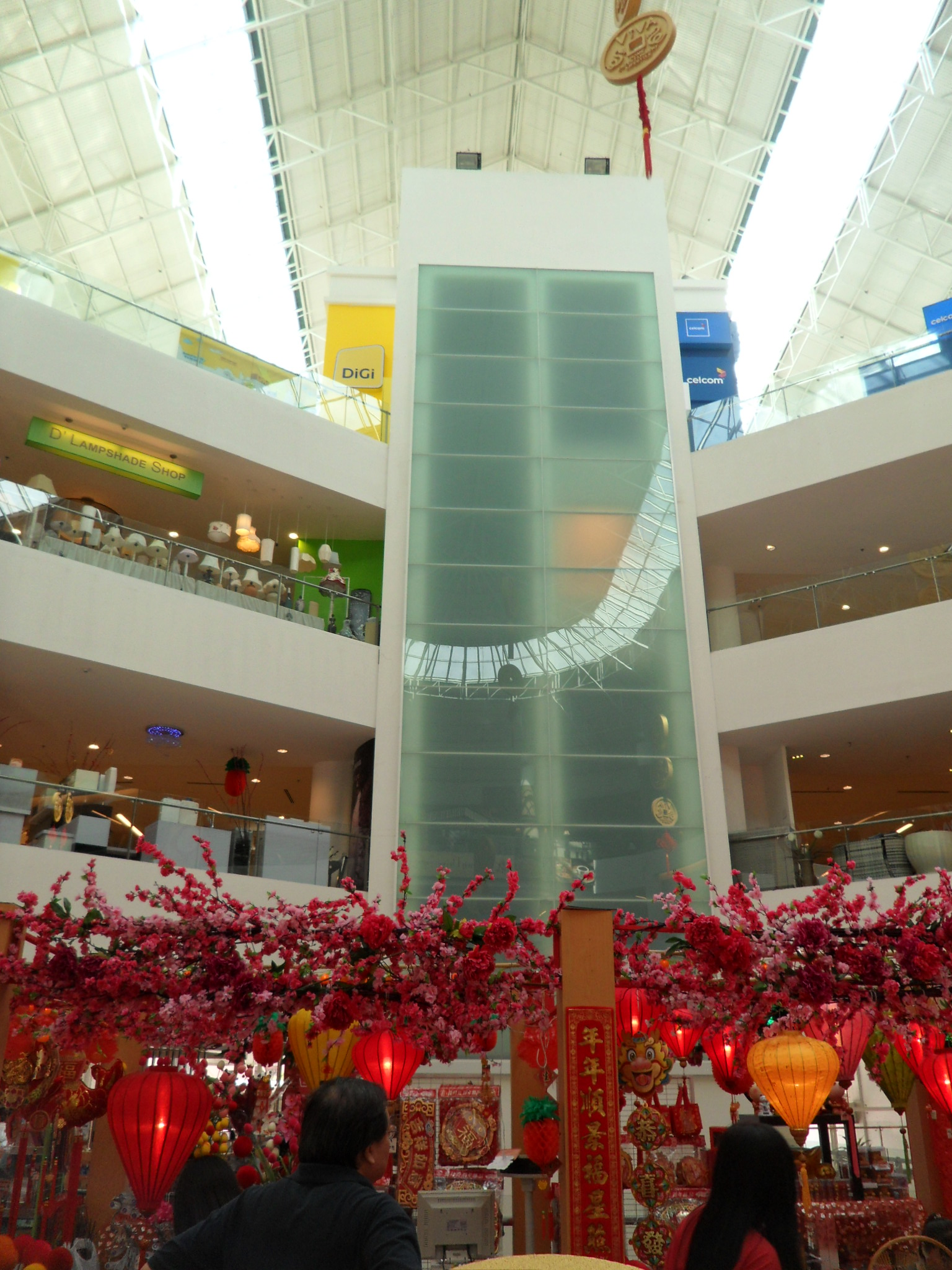
Lift tower of Viva Home

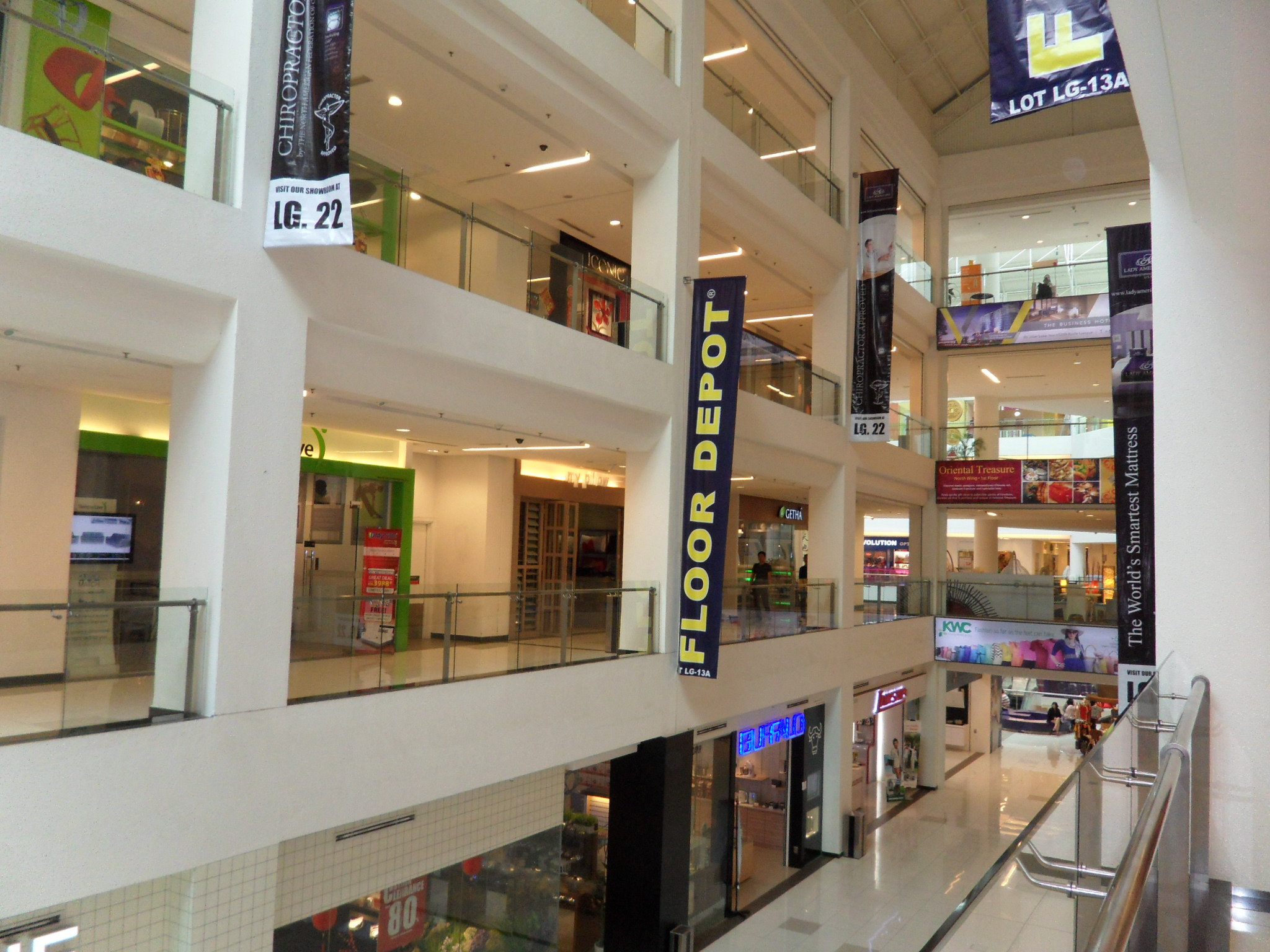
A section of the mall

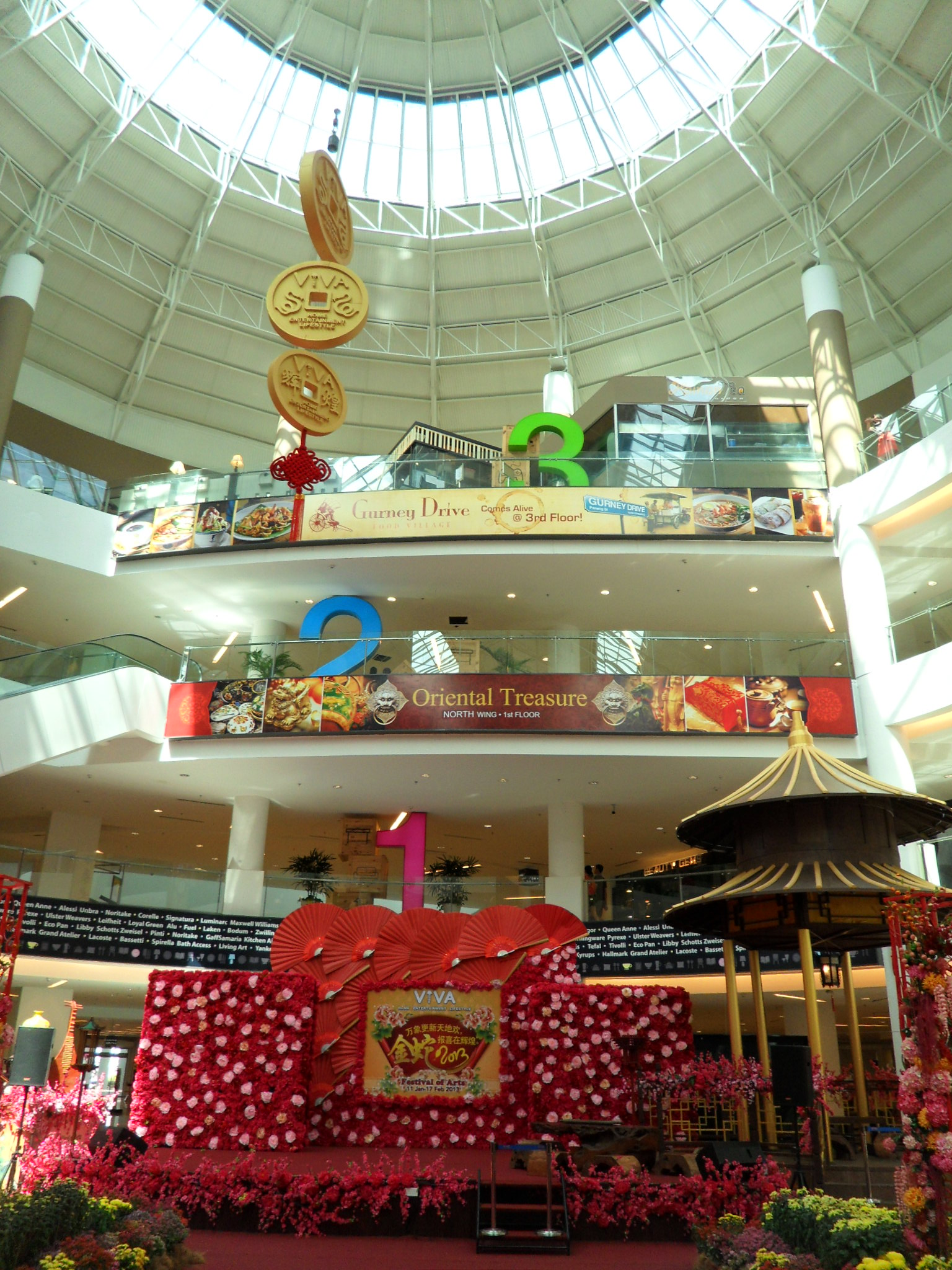
The three retail floors at a glance
