= Cathay Organisation =

Singaporean leisure and entertainment group

Cathay Organisation Holdings Limited
- Formerly: Associated Theatres Ltd
- Company type: Private Limited Company
- Founded: 18 July 1935; 90 years ago in Singapore, Straits Settlement
- Founders: Loke Cheng Kim; Loke Wan Tho; Khoo Teik Ee; Max Baker
- Fate: Active
- Headquarters: Singapore
- Website: www.cathay.com.sg

Cathay Organisation Holdings Limited is one of Singapore's leading leisure and entertainment groups. It operates the first THX cinema hall and digital cinema in Singapore. The group has operations in both Singapore and Malaysia.

== History ==
In July 1935, Loke Cheng Kim, her son Loke Wan Tho, Khoo Teik Ee and Max Baker incorporated Associated Theatres Ltd in Singapore. It served as one of Singapore's oldest cinema chain, its history predates World War II. In 1939, Associated Theatres Ltd introduced its first air conditioned cinema in the country. It was located at in the landmark Cathay Building at 2 Handy Road and screened its first movie, The Four Feathers (formally banned).

In 1959, Associated Theatres Ltd was rebranded as Cathay Organisation.

== Current Subsidiaries ==
- Cathay-Keris Films Pte Ltd
- Cathay Cineleisure International Pte Ltd
- Cathay Properties Pte Ltd
- Cathay Consultancy Services Pte Ltd
- Cathay Ed-Ventures Pte. Ltd
- Cathay Leisure Holdings Pte. Ltd.
- Cathay Hospitality Pte Ltd

== Past Subsidiaries ==
- Cathay Ad-house Pte Ltd
- Cathay Cineplexes Pte Ltd
- Hangout Hotels International Pte Ltd

== Hangout Hotels International ==
Hangout Hotels was a budget hotel chain operated by Cathay Organisation.

== See also ==
- List of cinemas in Singapore
- Golden Village
- Shaw Theatres
- WE Cinemas
