= List of cinemas in Singapore =

This is a list of cinemas in Singapore. All of Singapore's cinemas are fully digital, with the majority of them equipped with Dolby Surround 7.1 speakers. Most movies are presented in English and Mandarin Chinese subtitles along with English subtitles for non-English language films, though options for English subtitles-only films are also offered.

== Cinemas ==
Key:

– Operated by Carnival Cinemas
– Operated by Golden Village
– Operated by Shaw Organisation as Shaw Theatres
– Operated by mm2 Entertainment as Cathay Cineplexes, defunct since 2025
– Operated by Eng Wah Global as WE Cinemas, defunct since 2024
– Operated by other minor film chains

=== Currently operational cinemas ===
There are 29 cinema outlets currently operational across Singapore. Golden Village has the most outlets in the list than any other vendors, with 17. Then followed by Shaw Organisation with 8.

Cinema	Area	Operator	Year opened	Screens	Seats	Features								Notes	Ref
Cinema	Area	Operator	Year opened	Screens	Seats	3D (Note: For the sake of convenience, all cinema halls are screened digitally, with some outlets run with laser projection or RealD. Outlets with halls containing the option to upgrade to 3D screening (excluding IMAX) will be marked.)	Dolby (Note: For the sake of convenience, all cinema halls are equipped with Dolby 7.1 Surround system by default. Outlets with the option for different audio systems, such as Dolby Atmos, Auro 11.1 or DTS:X, will be marked.) Atmos	DTS:X	D-Box	IMAX	Premium (Note: Premium seatings are Deluxe and Gold Class (Golden Village), and premiere (Shaw). Golden Village also has Duo Deluxe, a combination of Couple seating.)	Family (Note: Kids feature are for Dreamers (Shaw) only; Golden Village also have family-oriented screenings at certain occasions, such instances which are indicated in yellow.)	English (Note: Most films are provided with Mandarin Chinese, along with English subtitles for non-English subtitles by default. Some cinema halls have options for English-only subtitles, which are marked.)	Notes	Ref
Balestier	Balestier	Shaw Organisation	1999	11	721	Yes		Lumiere 1-4			Lumiere 1-4	Dreamers		Merged from two cinemas, Hoover and President.	
Bugis+	Downtown Core	Golden Village	2023	8	1250	Yes					Gold Class Express 1 & 2		Yes	Formerly operated by Filmgarde until 2021.	
Capitol Theatre	Downtown Core	Golden Village	2015	1	800									Only operates from December to March every year.	
Causeway Point	Woodlands	MY Cinemas	2026	7	1784									10-hall cineplex previously operated by Studio Cinemas until 1999. Reduced to seven halls in 2001 and operated by Cathay Cineplexes until 2025.	
Century Square	Tampines	Golden Village	2026	6	668		Yes							Previously operated by Shaw Organisation as Century Cineplex from 1995 to 2017. It was then operated by Filmgarde, then Cathay Cineplexes until 2025.	
Cineleisure	Orchard Road	Golden Village	2023	6	1410	Yes							Yes	Previously operated by Cathay Cineplexes 1997-2023. Until 2025, ran concurrently with The Projector with three halls each.	
City Square Mall	Kallang	Golden Village	2009	6	1082						Gemini 4		Yes	Formerly a New World Amusement Park theatre location under Shaw Organisation.	
Djitsun Bedok	Bedok	Golden Village	2018	6	588	Yes							Yes	Formerly Princess Raja theatre from 1982-2008 under tenure of Chong Gay, then Overseas Organisation.	
Downtown East	Pasir Ris	Golden Village	2025	6	980									Formerly operated by Cathay Cineplexes from 2008 to 2025.	
Funan	Downtown Core	Golden Village	2019	7	441	Yes					Gold Class Express 5 Deluxe Plus 3 & 4 Gemini 2 & 7		Yes		
Grand, Great World City	River Valley	Golden Village	1999	5	566	Yes					Gold Class 2 & 3		Yes	Formerly a Great World Amusement Park theatre location under Shaw Organisation.	
Golden Mile Tower	Kallang	Carnival Cinemas	2014	4	1007									Previously operated by Chong Gay Theatres from 1973 as one large hall. Now run concurrently with Filmhouse (formerly, The Projector) with 3 halls and 550 seats.	
i12 Katong	Katong	Golden Village	2011	8	921	Yes					Gold Class 1 & 2		Yes		
Jem	Jurong East	Shaw Organisation	2025	10	1186					Yes	Premiere 1 & 2	Dreamers		Formerly operated by Cathay Cineplexes from 2013 to 2025.	
Jewel Changi Airport	Changi	Shaw Organisation	2019	11	828	Yes		Hall 5 Lumiere 1 & 2		Yes	Lumiere 1 & 2	Dreamers			
Junction 8	Bishan	Golden Village	1993	6	1148	Yes			Hall 1 & 2				Yes		
Jurong Point	Jurong West	Golden Village	1995	6	1080	Yes							Yes		
King Albert Park Mall	Bukit Timah	EagleWings Cinematics	2018	5	135						Gold/Platinum/Silver				
Lot One	Choa Chu Kang	Shaw Organisation	1996	8	664	Yes									
Lido	Orchard Road	Shaw Organisation	1993	11	1978	Yes				Yes	Lumiere Grand 1/Premiere 1 & 2	Dreamers	Yes	Formerly a small theatre of the same name from 1959 to 1990; originally a 5-hall cineplex, then expanded to eight halls in late 1996 before a major refurbishment in 2010, which expanded to 11 halls.	
Nex	Serangoon	Shaw Organisation	2010	10	1285	Yes					Premiere 1 & 2				
Oldham Theatre	Downtown Core	Asian Film Archive	2019	1	134	Yes	Yes								
Paya Lebar Quarter	Paya Lebar	Shaw Organisation	2019	12	986	Yes				Yes	Lumiere 1 & 2				
SingPost Centre	Paya Lebar	Golden Village	2017	8	772	Yes					Duo-Deluxe 1 & 2		Yes		
Suntec City	Downtown Core	Golden Village	2014	11	1410	Yes					Gold Class 1 & 2		Yes	Formerly operated by WE Cinemas as a 5-hall cineplex.	
Tampines Mall	Tampines	Golden Village	1996	8	1791	Yes						Event only	Yes		
VivoCity	Telok Blangah	Golden Village	2006	15	2194	Yes	GVmax		Yes			Event only	Yes	Includes one GVmax hall.	
Waterway Point	Punggol	Shaw Organisation	2016	11	1450	Yes				Yes					
Yishun 10	Yishun	Golden Village	1992	10	1499	Yes						Event only	Yes	Cinema outlet run as a multiplex building.	

=== Upcoming cinemas ===
Cinema	Area	Operator	Year to open	Screens	Seats	Notes	Ref
Oriental	Chinatown	Shaw Theatres	2027				

=== Outgoing cinemas ===
Cinema	Area	Operator	Screens	Seats	Tenure	Notes	Ref
Yishun 10	Yishun	Golden Village	10	1499	1992-2027	Closed down for redevelopment work into mixed-use complex by 2031. Also, it was the first and the only multiplex building.	

=== Defunct cinemas ===
There were 149 cinema outlets that were previously operational but now ceased operations due to various reasons such as low patronage, redevelopments, or transfer of operating vendor. The operator for each cinema outlet lists only the recent vendor, unless otherwise stated; furthermore, cinema outlets that are still available but replaced with a different vendor, or was temporarily closed due to refurbishment, are separate from this table.

Cinema	Area	Operator	Screens	Seats	Tenure	Notes	Ref
321 Clementi	Clementi	Cathay Cineplexes	10	728	2015-2025	Formerly Empress theatre from 1981 to 2006, and distributed Eng Wah from 2015 to 1 November 2024.	
AMK Hub	Ang Mo Kio	Cathay Cineplexes	8	1784	2007-2024		
Ang Mo Kio	Ang Mo Kio	Plaza Development	1	unknown	1980-1986		
Arcadia	Bedok	Independent	1	unknown	unknown		
Bedok	Bedok	Bombay Talkies	2	1427	1982-2006	Formerly operated by Cathay Organisation and then Golden Village.	
Broadway	Ang Mo Kio	Ayngaran International	2	1178	1981-2003	Formerly operated by Cathay Organisation and then Golden Village.	
Bugis Junction	Downtown Core	Shaw Organisation	3	1080	1995-2016	Formerly operated by United Artists until 2001.	
Cathay	Orchard Road	Cathay Cineplexes	8	1812	1939-2022	Temporarily closed for refurbishment from 2000 to 2006.	
Central, Toa Payoh	Toa Payoh	Independent	1	unknown	1972-1997	Formerly operated by Chong Gay Theatres, then Cathay Organisation and Golden Village.	
Central Mall	Clarke Quay	Studio City Cinemas	4	779	1997-1999		
Changi	Bedok	Shaw Organisation	3	1154	1981-2000		
Chinatown	Outram	Shaw Organisation	2	684	1990-1999		
Ciros	Telok Blangah	Shaw Organisation	1	unknown	1958-1986		
Clementi-Commonwealth	Clementi	Overseas Organisation	2	unknown	1981-2000	Formerly operated by Chong Gay Theatres.	
Da Dong Ya	Bukit Timah	Independent	1	unknown	1942-1946	Also known as Syonan-to Cinema.	
Dalit	Bukit Merah	Borneo Filem Organisation	1	unknown	1982-1995		
Diamond	Downtown Core	Independent	1	unknown	1947-1977		
Eastpoint	Bedok	Golden Village	6	1490	1997-2002	Formerly operated by Studio City Cinemas.	
East Shore	Kallang	Shaw Organisation	3	unknown	1982-2001	Formerly operated by Cathay Organisation and was known as Leisure-Drome.	
Empress	Clementi	Eng Wah Organisation	3	1326	1981-2006		
Empire	Hougang	Independent	1	unknown	1916-unknown		
Galaxy	Geylang	Golden Star Film Unit	1	unknown	1930s-1980s	Formerly known as Apollo then Garrick.	
Galaxy/Gala	Bukit Timah	Cathay Organisation	1	850	1978-1990s		
Gay/Happy World Amusement Park	Kallang	Eng Wah Organisation	3	unknown	1940s-1990s	Also called New Happy, Silver City, or Victory Amusement Park.	
Golden City	Queenstown	Golden Star Film Unit	1	unknown	1965-1984		
Golden Sultan	Downtown Core	D&D Trading	1	1080	1982-2003	Formerly operated by Cathay Organisation.	
Hollywood	Geylang	Eng Wah Organisation	1	unknown	1958-1995		
Imperial	Thomson	Independent	1	unknown	1970-1985		
Jade	Rochor	Carnival Cinemas	2	844	1976-2019	One of two cinemas in former Shaw Tower, the other being Prince. Previously operated by Shaw Organisation then Bombay Talkies until 2008. Reopened in 2017.	
JCube	Jurong East	Shaw Organisation	7	1010	2012-2023		
Jubilee	Ang Mo Kio	Eng Wah Organisation	4	734	1975-2010		
Jurong	Jurong East	Shaw Organisation	6	1003	1994-2008		
Jurong Drive-in	Jurong East	Cathay Organisation	1	900	1971-1985	Largest drive-in of Asia when opened in 1971 until closure on 30 September 1985.	
Kallang	Kallang	Chong Gay Theatres	1	1708	1972-1982		
King's Theatre	Bukit Merah	Eng Wah Organisation	1	unknown	1950s-1980s		
Kok Wah	Hougang	Independent	1	unknown	1960s-1980s		
Kreta Ayer People's Theatre	Outram	unknown	1	unknown	1969-1997	Formerly operated by Cathay Organisation and then Golden Village.	
Leisure Park Kallang	Kallang	Filmgarde Cineplexes	6	822	2002-2025	Formerly Leisure-Drome at East Shore from 1982 to 2001 under tenure of Cathay Organisation, then Shaw Organisation. Final Filmgarde outlet to cease operation.	
Liberty	Marine Parade	Shaw Organisation	1	unknown	1980-1990		
Liwagu	Bedok	Borneo Filem Organisation	1	1142	1982-1995		
Majestic	Outram	Cathay Organisation	1	1194	1928-1998		
Mandarin	Kallang	Eng Wah Organisation	2	unknown	1975-2000		
Marina	Downtown Core	Eng Wah Organisation	2	700	1986-1998		
Marina Leisureplex	Downtown Core	Golden Village	6	1451	1996-2014		
Marlborough	Rochor	Shaw Organisation	1	682	1909-1960s		
Mercury	Hougang	Independent	1	unknown	1960s-1980s		
Metropole	Tanjong Pagar	Kong Ngee Co Ltd	1	unknown	1958-1986		
New City	Geylang	Independent	1	unknown	1960s-1999		
New Town/New Crown	Ang Mo Kio	Overseas Organisation	2	1800	1982-2003	Formerly operated by Chong Gay Theatres.	
Ocean	Bedok	Independent	1	unknown	1960s-1986		
Odeon	Downtown Core	Cathay Organisation	1	1546	1953-1984		
Odeon-Katong	Geylang	Cathay Organisation	1	unknown	1950s-1993		
Oriental	Outram	Shaw Organisation	2	unknown	1990s-2000	Reopening in 2027.	
Palace/Paradise	Geylang	Overseas Organisation	1	unknown	1965-1992	Formerly operated by Cathay Organisation.	
Paramount	Serangoon	Independent	1	unknown	1958-1983		
Parkway Parade	Marine Parade	Cathay Cineplexes	7	898	2017-2023		
Pavilion	Tampines	Golden Village	4	unknown	1993-1998	Formerly operated by Cathay Organisation.	
Plaza	Kallang	Ayngaran International	1	unknown	1974-2009	Formerly operated by Plaza Development.	
Plaza Singapura	Orchard Road	Golden Village	10	1734	1998-2026	Closed due to low demand, and merging all into GV Cineleisure.	
Premiere	River Valley	Plaza Development	1	477	1978-1982		
Prince	Rochor	Shaw Organisation	2	1952	1976-2008	Formerly operated by United Artists for a period of time before returning to Shaw. Also called Alhambra and Marlborough, later as Shaw Tower.	
Queens	Geylang	Shaw Organisation	1	unknown	1932-1982		
Queenstown/Queensway	Queenstown	Overseas Organisation	2	1715	1977-1999	Formerly operated by Chong Gay Theatres.	
Regal	Bukit Merah	Cathay Organisation	1	unknown	1979-1998		
Republic	Marine Parade	Shaw Organisation	3	unknown	1982-1999		
Rex	Little India	Carnival Cinemas	3	734	2009-2018		
Riverside Point	River Valley	Studio City Cinemas	3	670	1996-1999		
Roxy	Geylang	Shaw Organisation	1	1200	1931-1978		
Ruby	Novena	Cathay Organisation	1	unknown	1958-1983		
S11 Dormitory Punggol	Punggol	Carnival Cinemas	2	404	2018-2023		
Savoy	Jurong West	Shaw Organisation	2	1578	1978-1998		
Seletar Mall	Sengkang	Shaw Organisation	8	739	2014-2024		
Singapura	Changi	Shaw Organisation	1	unknown	1960s-1990s		
Sin Wah	Bukit Panjang	Independent	1	unknown	unknown		
Straits	Woodlands	Independent	1	unknown	unknown		
Sun Plaza	Sembawang	Eng Wah Organisation	6	1243	2000-2009		
Taman Jurong	Jurong West	Shaw Organisation	1	unknown	1970s-1990s		
Tiong Bahru Plaza	Tiong Bahru	Golden Village	5	800	1994-2026	Closed due to low demand and duplicates with GV Great World.	
Toa Payoh	Toa Payoh	Eng Wah Organisation	5	934	1975-2010		
Venus	Queenstown	Kong Ngee Co Ltd	1	1200	1965-1985		
Vision	Hougang	Shaw Organisation	4	1200	1993-2000		
West Mall	Bukit Batok	Cathay Cineplexes	6	1006	1998-2025	Formerly operated by Eng Wah Organisation.	
White Sands	Pasir Ris	Eng Wah Organisation	4	800	1997-1999		
Woodlands	Woodlands	Shaw Organisation	2	619	1981-1999		
Yangtze	Outram	Independent	2	425	1977-2016		
Yong Hua	Kovan	Independent	1	unknown	1960s-1980s		
Zenith	Hougang	Independent	1	unknown	1975-1984		

==== Transfer of vendors ====
Defunct cinemas that are being transferred and redeveloped into new cinemas that are currently operational.

Cinema	Area	Operator	Screens	Seats	Tenure	Notes	Ref
Great World Amusement Park	River Valley	Shaw Organisation	4	unknown	1930s-1980s	Also called Atlantic, Canton, Globe and Sky. Would become Great World City.	
Hoover	Novena	Shaw Organisation	1	900	1960-1996	Merged with President at Balestier and retained vendor.	
Lido	Orchard Road	Shaw Organisation	1	unknown	1959-1990	Repurposed into Shaw House and retained vendor.	
New World Amusement Park	Whampoa	Shaw Organisation	3	unknown	1920-1980s	Also called Grand, Pacific and State. Would become City Square Mall.	
President	Novena	Shaw Organisation	1	1200	1973-1996	Merged with Hoover into Shaw Plaza at Balestier and retained vendor.	
Princess Raja	Bedok	Overseas Organisation	3	1900	1982-2008	Formerly operated by Chong Gay Theatres. Would become Djitsun Bedok	
