= Sachin: A Billion Dreams =

2017 film by James Erskine

- Theatrical release poster
- Directed by: James Erskine
- Written by: James Erskine; Sivakumar Ananth
- Starring: Sachin Tendulkar; MS Dhoni; Virender Sehwag
- Cinematography: Sudeep Chatterjee
- Edited by: Deepa Bhatia
- Music by: Songs: A. R. Rahman; Background Score: A. R. Rahman; Qutub-E-Kripa
- Production companies: 200 NotOut Productions and Carnival Motion Pictures
- Distributed by: AA Films; Cineestan AA Distributors
- Release date: 26 May 2017
- Running time: 2h 18 min
- Country: India
- Languages: Marathi; Hindi; English
- Budget: ₹39 crores
- Box office: est.₹76.86 crore (US$8.0 million)

Sachin: A Billion Dreams is a 2017 Indian documentary sports film directed by James Erskine and produced by Ravi Bhagchandka and Shrikant Bhasi under the banners 200 NotOut Productions and Carnival Motion Pictures. The film is a documentary on the life of Indian cricketer Sachin Tendulkar. It captures Tendulkar's cricket and personal life in substantial detail, as well as reveals a few aspects of his life which have never been heard of or seen before.

The film featured dialogues in Marathi, Hindi and English and was released on 26 May 2017, along with the dubbed versions in Tamil and Telugu. This film was declared tax free in Maharashtra, Chhattisgarh, Karnataka, Kerala, and Odisha. The film was an average grosser at the box office.

== Plot ==
The film follows two main plots. The first covers Sachin's childhood and cricket career up to 1999, while the second focuses on his transformation into the 'God of Cricket' and his eventual first World Cup win. Sachin provides most of the narration, with additional narration by Harsha Bhogle and Boria Majumdar. The story is told through interviews and scenes featuring cricketers, actors and other celebrities, alongside video recordings of Sachin's personal life and cricket matches.

Before the film, clips show the birth of Sachin's daughter Sara. It begins with Sachin tricking a friend into falling into a bore. He recalls his childhood and developing an interest in cricket after India's 1983 triumph. He trained under coach R. Achrekar and moved to his aunt's house to live closer to the park. Sachin gained prominence after forming a 664-run partnership with Vinod Kambli and continued practising daily until he was signed by Yorkshire.

Following a narration of the Indo-Pak rivalry, Sachin makes his international debut against Pakistan, where he performs well. He is selected for the 1992 Cricket World Cup, although India has a poor tournament. Sachin's career subsequently begins to rise rapidly.

The film then shows Sachin and his wife Anjali walking in a park as he recalls how they met and later married. His growing prominence leads into the 1996 World Cup, where India is eliminated by Sri Lanka in the semifinal despite Sachin's strong performance.

Before the 1999 World Cup, Sachin's father dies. Despite playing while depressed, Sachin performs well, although India fails to reach the final. The film then examines the darkest phase of Indian cricket, after which the BCCI rebuilds the team with new players. Sachin serves as captain twice, resigning both times under pressure, but continues improving his performances. He becomes the country's most prominent sporting celebrity and features extensively in TV ads, while Mark Mascarenhas becomes his agent.

The film depicts Sachin's rivalries with fellow cricketers developing into friendships and highlights India's famous Test victory over Australia. At the 2003 World Cup, Sachin is Player of the Series, although India loses the final. The narrative also follows his relationship with his son Arjun, who was born two weeks after Sachin's father's death. Sachin trains with him and hopes he will become a cricketer, bringing Arjun into the public eye.

Before the 2007 World Cup, the team loses confidence under coach Greg Chappell's advice and perceived discriminatory policies. India is eliminated early by Sri Lanka, after which Chappell is replaced by Gary Kirsten.

Depressed by the setbacks, Sachin is encouraged by his brother Ajit to win the World Cup. With the 2011 Cricket World Cup taking place in India, including the final in his home city, Sachin prepares for what may be his final opportunity. He also becomes the all-time leading Test run scorer. Away from cricket, he remains close to his childhood friends, whom he considers an important part of his life.

India reaches the final after Sachin scores two centuries in the group stage. He is dismissed for 18, seemingly ending his World Cup campaign, but Gautam Gambhir and MS Dhoni lead India to victory, with Dhoni sealing the win with a six. Sachin's lifelong dream is fulfilled, and the nation dedicates the victory to his 24 years of service. He later scores his 100th century against Bangladesh, reaching a milestone considered impossible.

Sachin plays his final Test in 2013. After scoring 74, he delivers an emotional farewell speech, thanking those who supported him throughout his career, and leaves the pitch in tears. Having achieved his ambitions, he walks along the beach and thanks God.

In a post-credits video, Sachin's father expresses that, despite loving every member of his family equally, Sachin is and will always remain special to him.

== Cast ==
- Sachin Tendulkar as himself
- MS Dhoni as himself
- Virat Kohli as himself
- Harbhajan Singh as himself
- Yuvraj Singh as himself

== Release ==
The film was released on 26 May 2017 in India. On 21 May, Sachin Tendulkar conducted a special screening of the film for the Indian Armed Forces personnel at the Indian Air Force Auditorium.

The film was released in five languages: English, Hindi, Marathi, Tamil and Telugu. Filmmakers cited the desire to appeal to fans across India.

== Marketing ==
The name of the film was selected via a contest that Sachin Tendulkar had announced on Twitter.

In May 2017, Sachin traveled to London to promote the film.

== Soundtrack ==
Sachin: A Billion of Dreams

Soundtrack album by A.R. Rahman
- Released: 28 April 2017 (Hindi); 23 May 2017 (Tamil, Telugu and Marathi)
- Genre: Feature film soundtrack
- Length: 12:00
- Label: Junglee Music

A.R. Rahman chronology
| Kaatru Veliyidai (2017) | Sachin: A Billion of Dreams (2017) | Mom (2017) |

The music was composed by A. R. Rahman, with lyrics written by Irshad Kamil, and the lyrics for Tamil, Telugu and Marathi were written by Madhan Karky, Vanamali and Subodh Khanolkar respectively. The complete album featuring three songs were released on 28 April 2017 in Hindi, Tamil, Telugu and Marathi.

=== Tracklist ===
Original Version (Hindi)
| No. | Title | Lyrics | Singer(s) | Length |
|---|---|---|---|---|
| 1. | "Hind Mere Jind" | Irshad Kamil | A. R. Rahman | 05:14 |
| 2. | "Sachin Sachin" | Irshad Kamil | Sukhwinder Singh, Kalee | 04:09 |
| 3. | "Marada Maratha" | Irshad Kamil | A.R. Ameen, Anjali Galikwad | 03:34 |
| Total length: | | | | 12:00 |

== Reception ==
Hindustan Times wrote in their review that the movie had "everything" to make its audience "nostalgic". The Times of India gave 3 stars out of five.

== Awards ==
The film won the trophy for the Best Director of a Long Documentary, the Special Award for the Best Film in the Long Documentary section and an honorary diploma at the 11th Tehran International FICTS Festival 2018.
