= Paras Downtown Square =

Shopping mall in Zirakpur, India

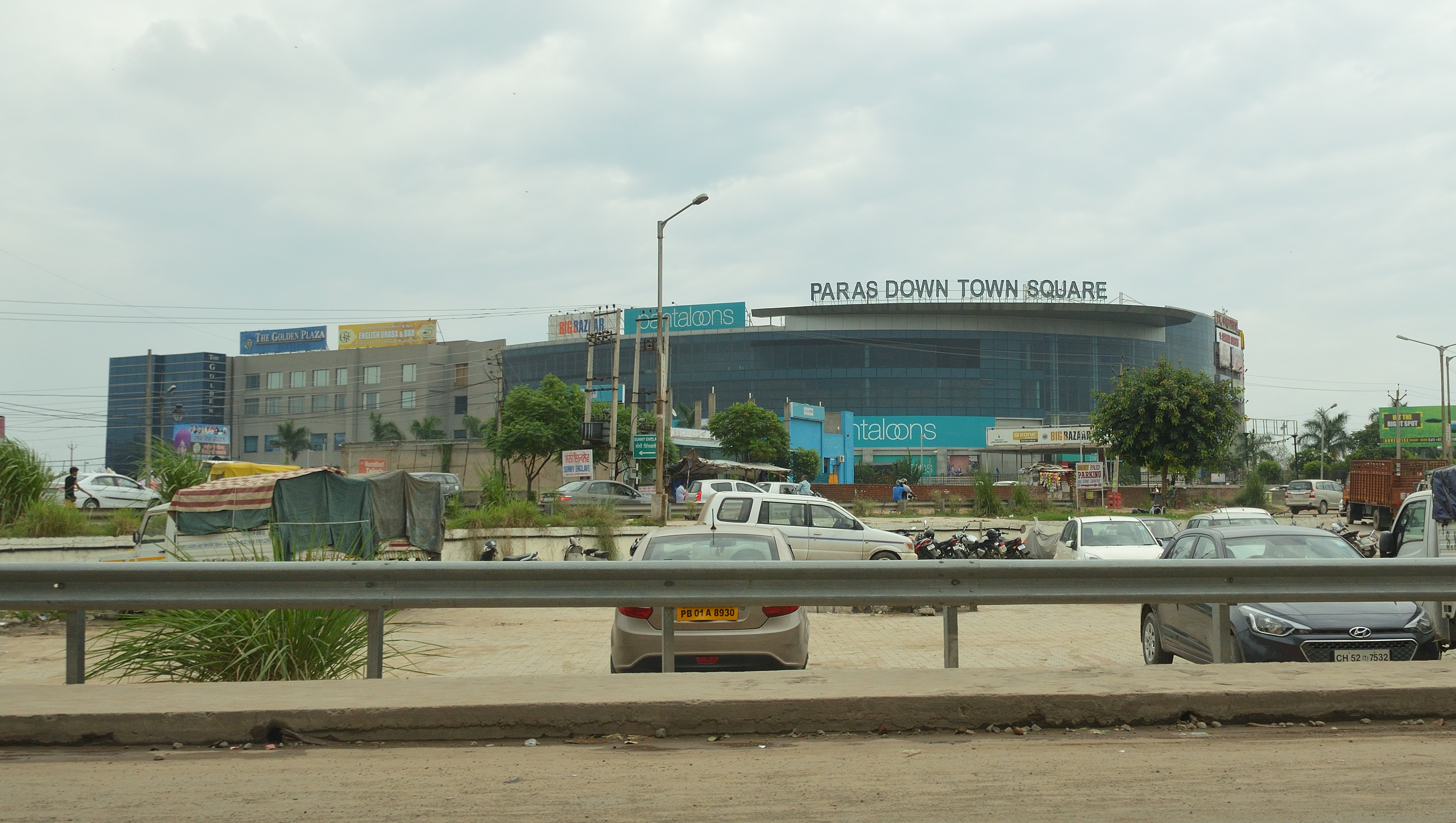
Paras Downtown Square at Zirakpur, Mohali district

Paras Downtown Square is a shopping mall in Zirakpur, Punjab, India. It is one of the largest shopping mall in the entire region comprising Chandigarh and its satellite cities. Built by lakshya garg of ambalaIt is strategically located just near the new overhead bypass under construction on 'Y' form of Delhi-Chandigarh-Kalka highway on 350,000 sq ft (33,000 m^{2}) area and is the hub of entertainment for the people living in and near Chandigarh, Patiala, Panchkula, Ambala, Zirakpur and Mohali.

== Features ==
The project won the Best Commercial Property Award at the Indian Property Awards 2007 in November 2007 and the key highlights include North India's first Rooftop Football Ground by Tiki Taka Football Ground, a four-screen multiplex by BIG Cinemas, a Big Bazaar hypermarket, anchor store, sprawling food court and children entertainment centre with many specialty restaurants such as Mcdonald's, Domino's etc.

The major brands that are present here include Tiki Taka Football Ground, Pantaloon, Big Bazaar, BIG Cinemas, United Colors of Benetton, McDonald's, Cafe Coffee Day, Liberty, Levi's, Domino's Pizza, Nike, Woodland and many others.
