= List of ice rinks in Southeast Asia =

The following is a list of ice skating rinks in Southeast Asia.

== Indonesia ==
Venue	City	Tournaments	Opened	Seats	Ref
Skyrink	Jakarta		1996		
BX Rink	South Tangerang		2014		

== Malaysia ==
Venue	City	Tournaments	Opened	Seats	Ref
Malaysia National Ice Skating Stadium	Kuala Lumpur	2017 Southeast Asian Games (Ice hockey)	2017	600	
Sunway Pyramid Ice	Selangor		1997		

== Philippines ==
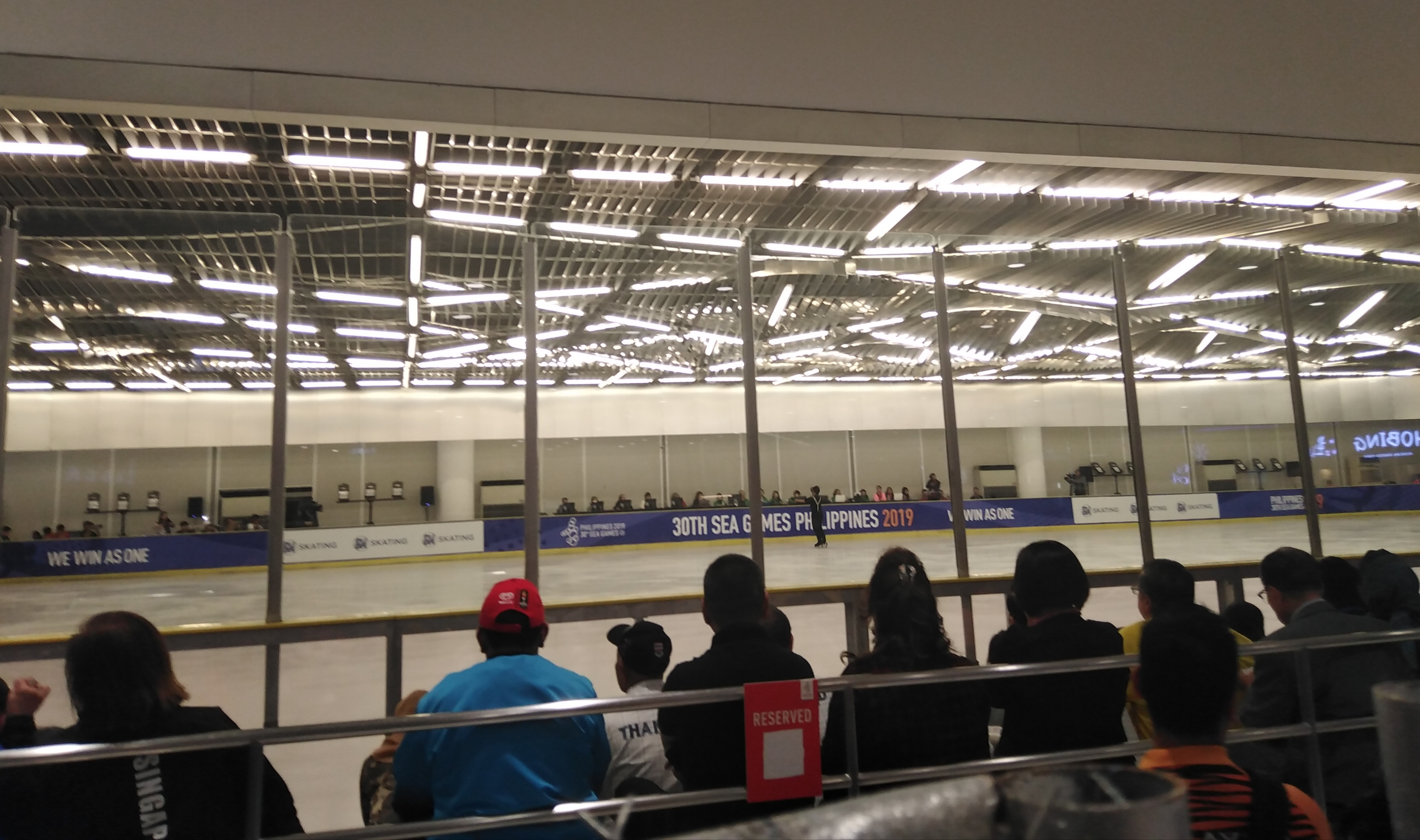
SM Skating Megamall

Venue	City	Tournaments	Opened	Seats	Ref
SM Skating Mall of Asia	Pasay	2019 Southeast Asian Games (Ice hockey)	2017	300	
SM Skating Megamall	Mandaluyong	2019 Southeast Asian Games (Figure skating, Short track speed skating)	2014		
SM Skating Southmall	Las Piñas	—			
SM Skating Seaside City Cebu	Cebu City	—	2015		

Former venues

Venue	City	Tournaments	Opened	Closed	Seats	Notes	Ref
SM Mall of Asia Ice Skating Rink	Mandaluyong	—	2006	?		Located on the ground floor of the main mall. Replaced by another ice skating rink on the third level.	
SM City Cebu Ice Skating Rink	Cebu City	—	1993	late 2000s		Located within the foodcourt area on the lower ground floor of the main building. It was closed and was replaced with a bigger entertainment plaza. SM Skating was reintroduced in Cebu when SM Seaside City Cebu opened in 2015.	
SM Megamall Ice Skating Rink	Mandaluyong	—	1992	2006		Another ice skating rink was built in another portion of the mall.	
New Frontier Theater Skating Rink	Quezon City	—	1968	?			

== Singapore ==
Venue	Location	Tournaments	Opened	Seats	Ref
The Rink SG	Jurong East	—	2012	460	
