= SIHA =

SIHA is a four-letter acronym that may refer to:

- Schweizerischer Eishockeyverband, The Swiss Ice Hockey Association
- Scottish Ice Hockey Association
- Swedish Ice Hockey Association
- Singapore Ice Hockey Association
