= Marlborough Cinema =

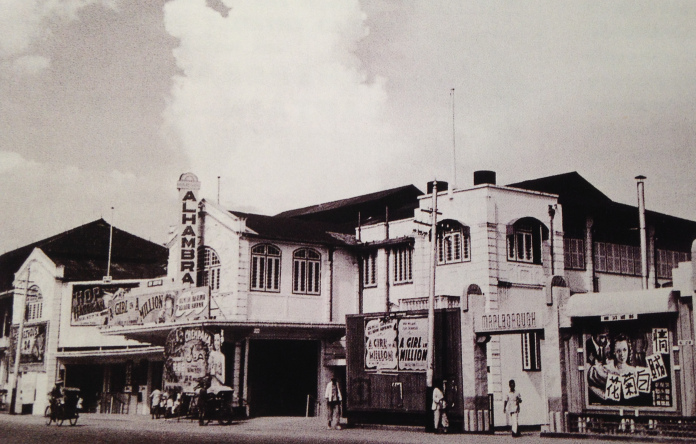

General information
- Status: Demolished
- Type: Movie theater
- Location: Beach Road, Singapore
- Owner: 1909–1938: Tan Cheng Kee (former); 1938–late 1960s: Shaw Brothers

Other information
- Seating capacity: 682

Marlborough Cinema was a single-screen cinema hall located on Beach Road in Singapore. It was in operation from 1909, before the building was demolished in the early 1970s. to make way for the construction of Shaw Tower.

== History ==
Records showed that Marlborough Cinema, owned by Peranakan businessman Tan Cheng Kee, was in operation by January 1909. Before the establishment of Marlborough Cinema, another cinema, French Cinema, was set up as a tent on its site in 1906.

The advent of “talkies”, or sound films, led the cinema hall to undergo extensive interior and exterior renovations in 1930. On 1 May 1933, Marlborough Cinema came under the management of Amalgamated Theatres Limited.

The first “all-Malay talkie” film, Leila Majnun, premiered at the Marlborough on 27 March 1934.

=== Ownership under Shaw ===
In 1938, the lease for Marlborough Cinema under Tan Cheng Kee ran out, and thus the cinema changed hands to the Shaw Brothers. During this period of time, Marlborough Cinema showed mainly Chinese films, interspersed with the occasional Tamil film.

=== Demolishment ===
The cinema hall closed down in the late 1960s, before it was demolished in the early 1970s in order to build Shaw Tower.

== Architecture ==
Marlborough Cinema was built on Beach Road, on a site known as the Raffles Reclamation Ground, which was created from past reclamation projects in the 1840s and 1890s

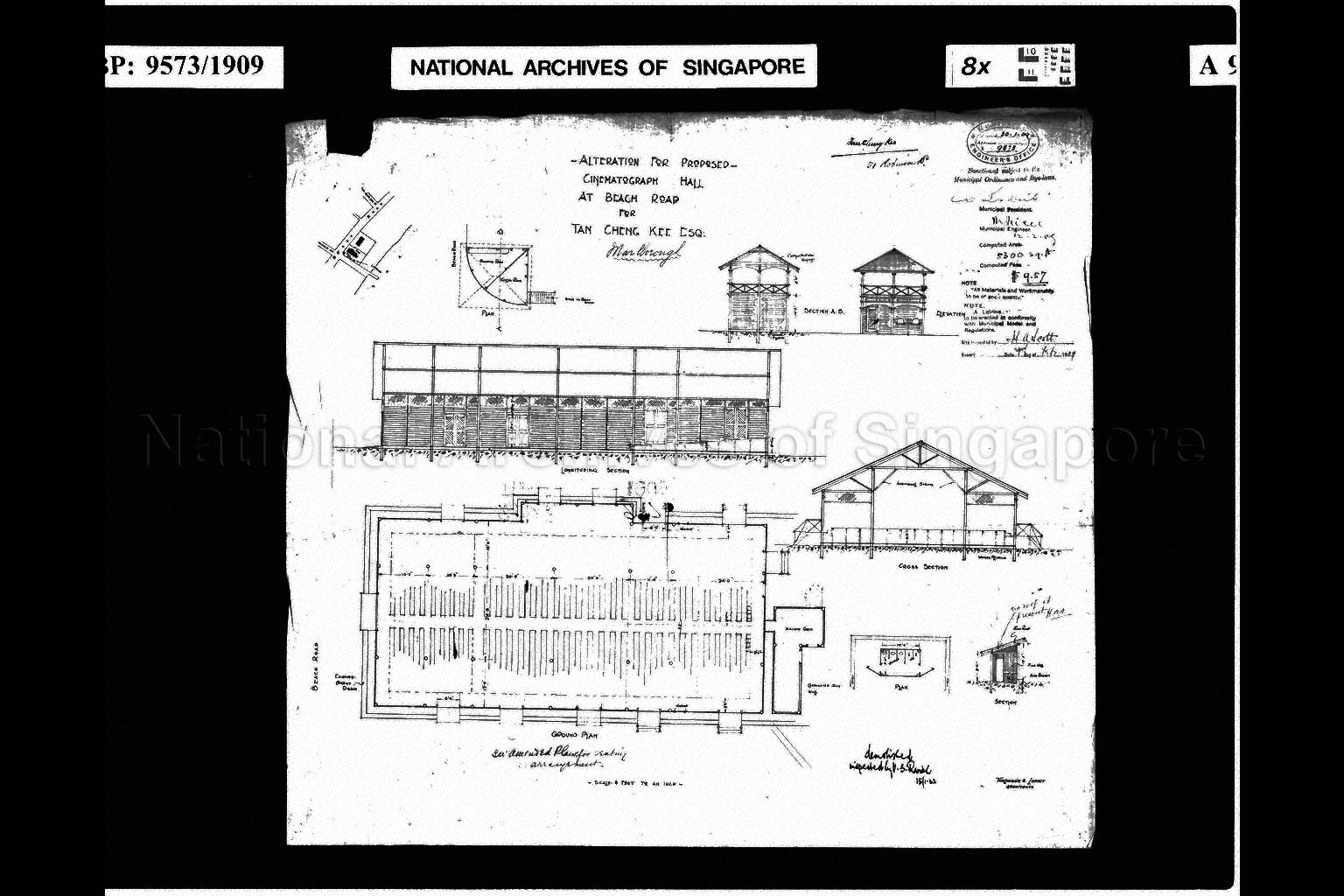
Plans and sections of Marlborough Cinema dated 1909, showing a simple gabled structure that was internally lined with wooden benches.

Building plans dated 1909 showed that Marlborough Cinema was a structure of simple construction: a large, corrugated zinc hall with a gabled roof. It was situated on a narrow, elongated plot of land. Wooden benches lined its interior, and were separated by aisles.

From oral interviews, a recessed orchestral pit was presumed to have taken up space in front of the screen between 1909 and 1930, to house musicians who would play accompanying music to silent films.

The topmost photo, dating to the 1920s, shows a flat-arch entrance way, with marquees displaying posters of movies currently showing at the cinema.

Renovations carried out in 1930 wired the cinema hall for sound, and electric fans were also installed. The wooden benches were replaced by flip-up chairs, expanding the seating from 550 to 682, and presumably filling up the orchestral pit.

== Gallery ==
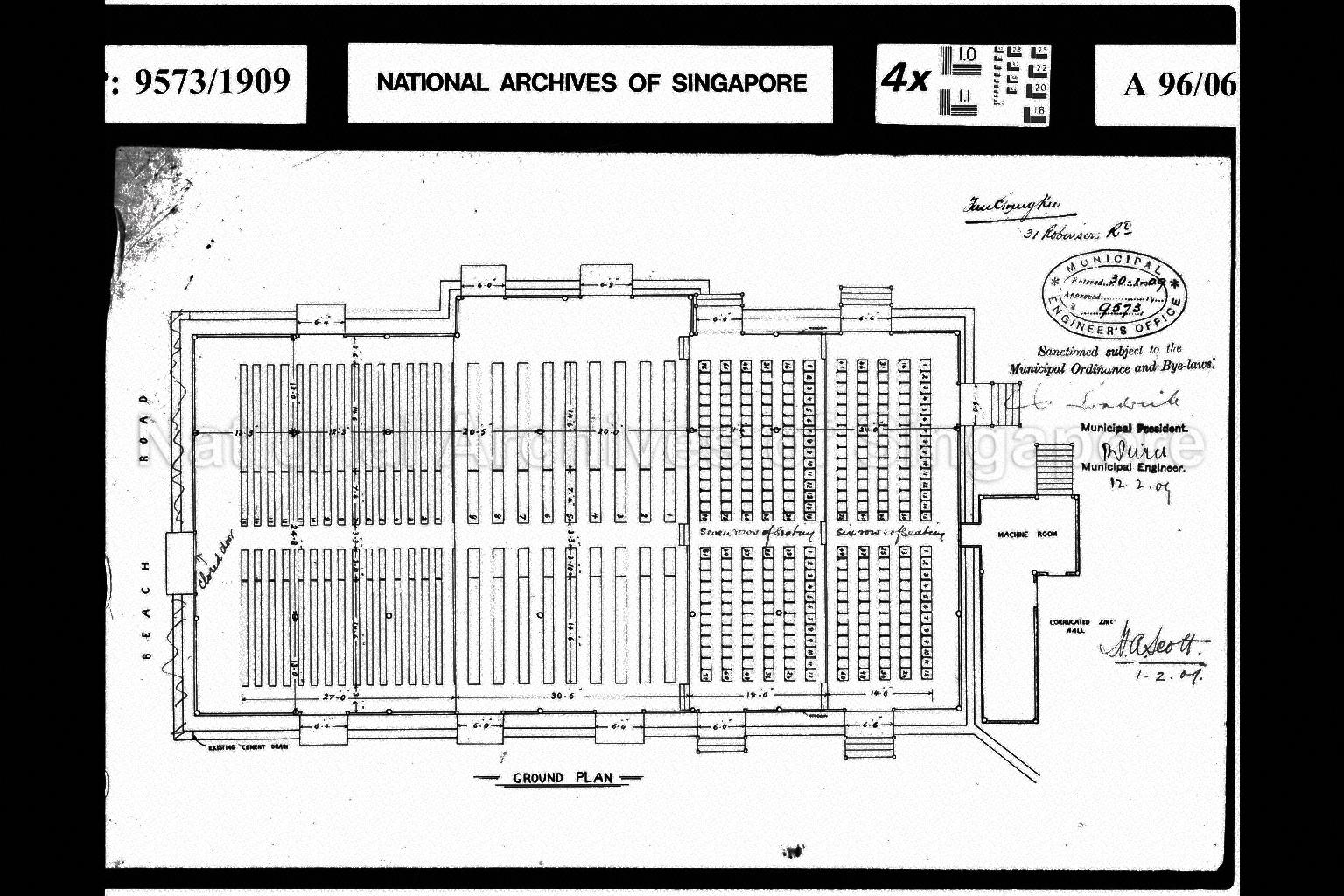
1909 ground plan of Marlborough Cinema showing seating arrangement in detail.

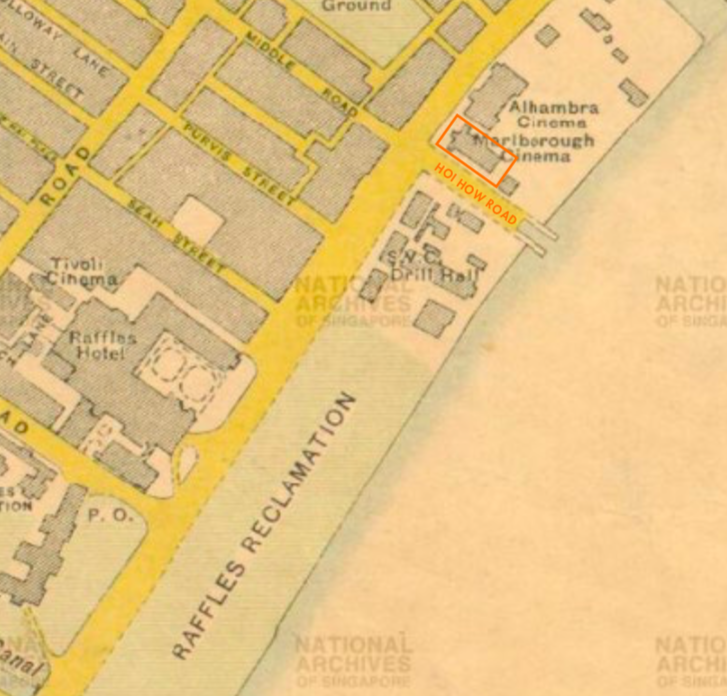
1932 Singapore survey map with the location of Marlborough Cinema highlighted in orange.

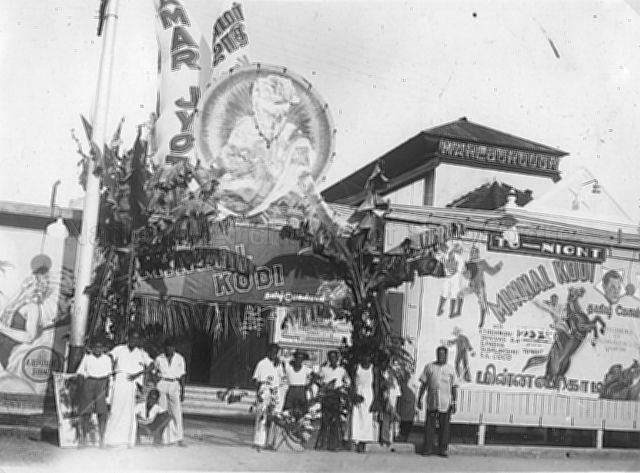
1938-9 photo of Marlborough Cinema at Beach Road.

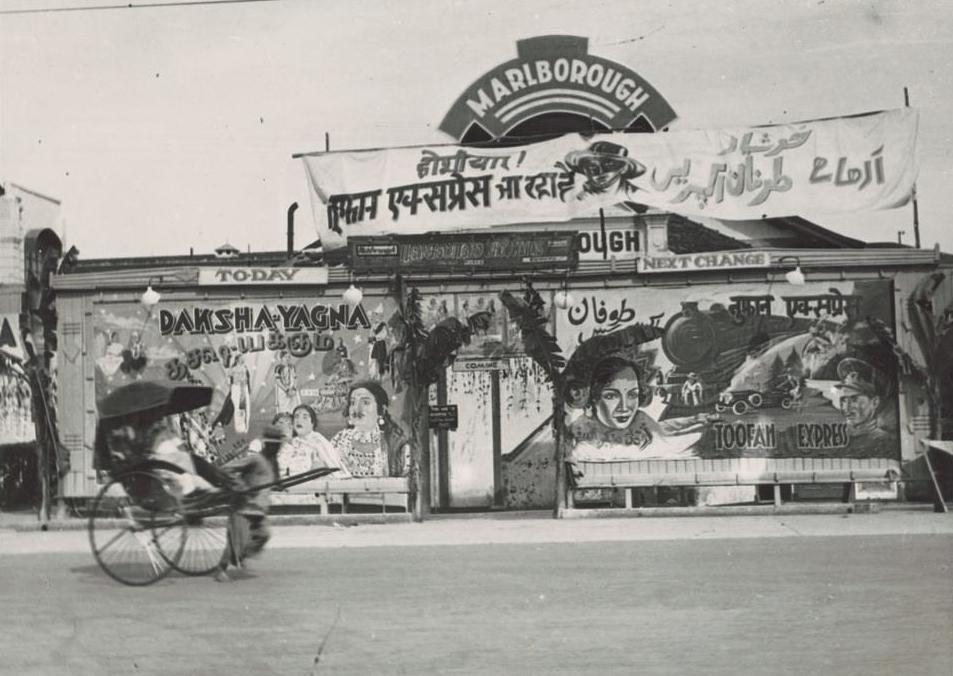
Marlborough Cinema at Beach Road around 1938 and 1939.

== See also ==
- List of cinemas in Singapore
