= Singapore Ice Hockey Association =

Singapore
- Association name: Singapore Ice Hockey Association
- IIHF Code: SIN
- IIHF membership: 2 May 1996
- President: Alphonsus Joseph

The Singapore Ice Hockey Association (SIHA Singapore) is a non-profit organisation that has been running the National Ice Hockey League of Singapore (NIHL Singapore) since 2000, hosting ice hockey tournaments in Asia since 2001, and funding several developmental activities over this time. The association is funded by player fees and private sponsorship.

== History ==
In 1988, an ice skating rink was built in Singapore by a private investor Fuji Ice Palace in the outskirts of the City Central. In the mid-1990s, the Fuji Ice Palace found a new location at Jurong Entertainment Centre where it has operated until 2008. By 16 October 2008, Fuji Ice Palace had ceased its operations. By the year 2012, three more ice skating rinks have been built, Kallang Ice World, Marina Bay Sands and The Rink @ JCube, in which The Rink @ JCube stands on the previous location of the Fuji Ice Palace.

In 1997 a local league was started at Fuji Ice Palace, organized by the Ice Hockey Association, Singapore with six teams. Due to the high costs for individual players, the league shut down after one year of operation. Between that time and the formation of the AIHA and NIHL in late 2000, "pick-up" sessions of informal games were organized by various local and expatriate players. The Canadian Association of Singapore has also run various hockey activities over the years, most recently a comprehensive youth hockey program since at least 1997.

In 2001, the SIHA was founded.

The National Ice Hockey League of Singapore and its parent body, the Amateur Ice Hockey Association (Singapore) were the brainchild of Greg Blakney, a longtime Asian and Singaporean resident. Greg had a vision of creating a comprehensive infrastructure for developing hockey in Singapore, from bringing together the top players on the island (locals and expats) to play in the NIHL, to helping recruit and develop local talent. It has only been since the creation of the AIHA and NIHL, that Singapore has had the foundation on which to build a meaningful national ice hockey body.

The SIHA has also formed a national junior team.
