= Shrikant Bhasi =

Indian entrepreneur

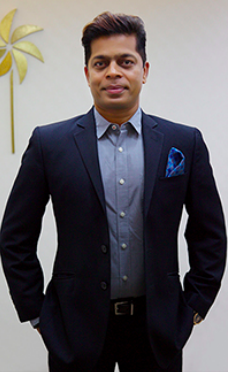
- Born: 23 November 1968 (age 57); Angamaly, Ernakulam, Kerala, India
- Education: Barkatullah University, Bhopal
- Occupation: Businessman
- Years active: 1998 – present
- Parents: C. M. Bhasi (father); C. P. Ally (mother)

Shrikant Bhasi (born 23 November 1968), is an Indian entrepreneur. He is also the founder and chairman of the Carnival Group, a diversified corporate group with interests in multiplex, media, entertainment, hospitality and real estate.

== Early life and career ==
Shrikant Bhasi was born to C. P. Ally and C. M. Bhasi in the small town of Angamaly in Kerala on 23 November 1968. He was a commerce student and graduated in 1987 from Barkatullah University, Bhopal.

In 1988, Shrikant joined Britannia, where he worked in its agri- division. He quit the company in 1992 and leased out a soybean crushing unit called Action Management Group, however changing government policies meant that the industry did not remain profitable.

== Carnival Media ==
Carnival Media was founded in 2011 and is a Mumbai-based company and a part of the diversified corporate group. It focuses on creating, producing, and developing media properties in live events and also manages shows and concerts in India and abroad. The company works in multiple areas that include television shows, Bollywood movies and music, corporate seminars and training, education workshops, and various promotional and entertainment events in India and overseas.

== Carnival Cinemas ==
Shrikant Bhasi began working in the entertainment industry after he launched a project to test the market of film trade financing in India during which he realized that there was a dearth of screens in India. This led to the opening of Carnival Cinemas' first theatre in Angamaly which was built on the top floor of a bus terminal complex. The venture was a success, prompting the company to expand to Kerala and Tamil Nadu, and eventually to the rest of India.

In 2014 Carnival Cinemas acquired HDIL's Broadway Cinema chain, which had screens across Mumbai, Delhi and Indore. They also acquired Anil Ambani's Big Cinemas, which made them one of the top three exhibition companies in India. The following year the company purchased the commercial real estate projects Larsen and Toubro Ltd for Rs. 1,785 crore. Bhasi and Carnival's next major step was the acquisition of Anil Ambani owned Big Cinemas with 250 screens across the country for around Rs 700 crore. During this time Bhasi also took over Mukesh Ambani's Network 18 Media and Investments Ltd owned Glitz Cinemas. Subsequently, all the Big Cinemas multiplex screens were re-branded as Carnival Cinemas by 2016. As a result of the merger, Carnival had operations in 20 states: Kerala, Chhattisgarh, Karnataka, Tamil Nadu, Andhra Pradesh, Telangana, Maharashtra, Madhya Pradesh, Rajasthan, Punjab, Gujarat, Haryana, Delhi NCR, Jharkhand, Uttar Pradesh, Uttarakhand, West Bengal, Assam, Bihar, Himachal Pradesh and Goa with 470 screens in 120 locations. There were plans to double the screen count to 1000 screens by 2023.

Shrikant Bhasi had further stated that he follows both organic and inorganic growth plans and the company has laid out a large scale growth plan in Madhya Pradesh. The company has named the project "Project Jalsa" and they have expressed the belief that this will contribute to the overall development of the state while also providing other benefits to the government and community. If successful, Bhasi would expand the project to another 50 towns in the state and to other states like Bihar, Jharkhand, and Orissa.

However, due to the COVID-19 pandemic, Carnival Cinemas was unable to continue operations in a sustainable manner and ended in debt.This led to closure of operations in many cities and filing of several petitions against the cinema chain for insolvency.

== Travancore Foods India Pvt Ltd ==
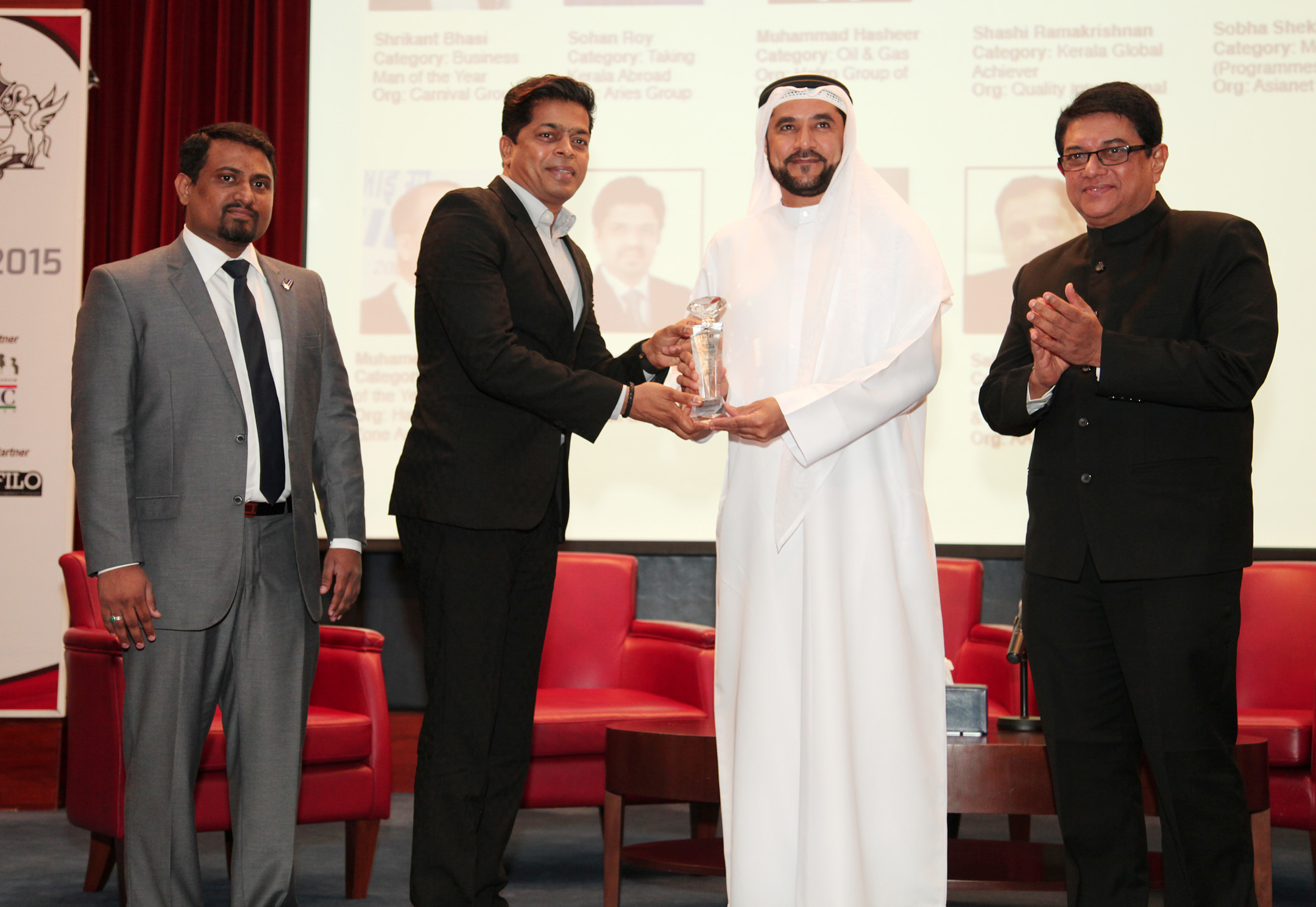
Mr. Shrikant Bhasi, Chairman of Carnival Group receiving Businessman of the Year award from Dr. Rashid Al Leem, Chairman (SEWA) in presence of Shri M.P. Joseph IAS and Mr. Ansif Merchant, Editor in Chief, Cochin Herald

Travancore Foods India Pvt.Ltd (TFIPL) is the food and beverages division of the Carnival Group and was founded along with the parent company in 2011. The business has set up two cafes in Mumbai and houses several brands such as Carnival Court, a chain of food courts, and the coffee shop chain Red Bubble Café.

Carnival group shut down its both the cafes D'Bell and Cafe Sabrosa in 2017.

== Awards ==
- NIB Award for Business Icon of the Year by Ernakulam Press Club and Public Relations Council of India at Kochi (2015, won.)
- Named one of The Economic Times' "50 Inspiring Entrepreneurs of India" at The Economic Times India Entrepreneurship Summit at Delhi (2015)
- 2014 Entrepreneur of the Year at the Dhanam Business Awards by Dhanam Magazine at Kochi (2015, won)
- Outstanding Achievement Award at CMO Asia Multiplex Excellence Award (2015, won)
