= Cathay Cineleisure Orchard =

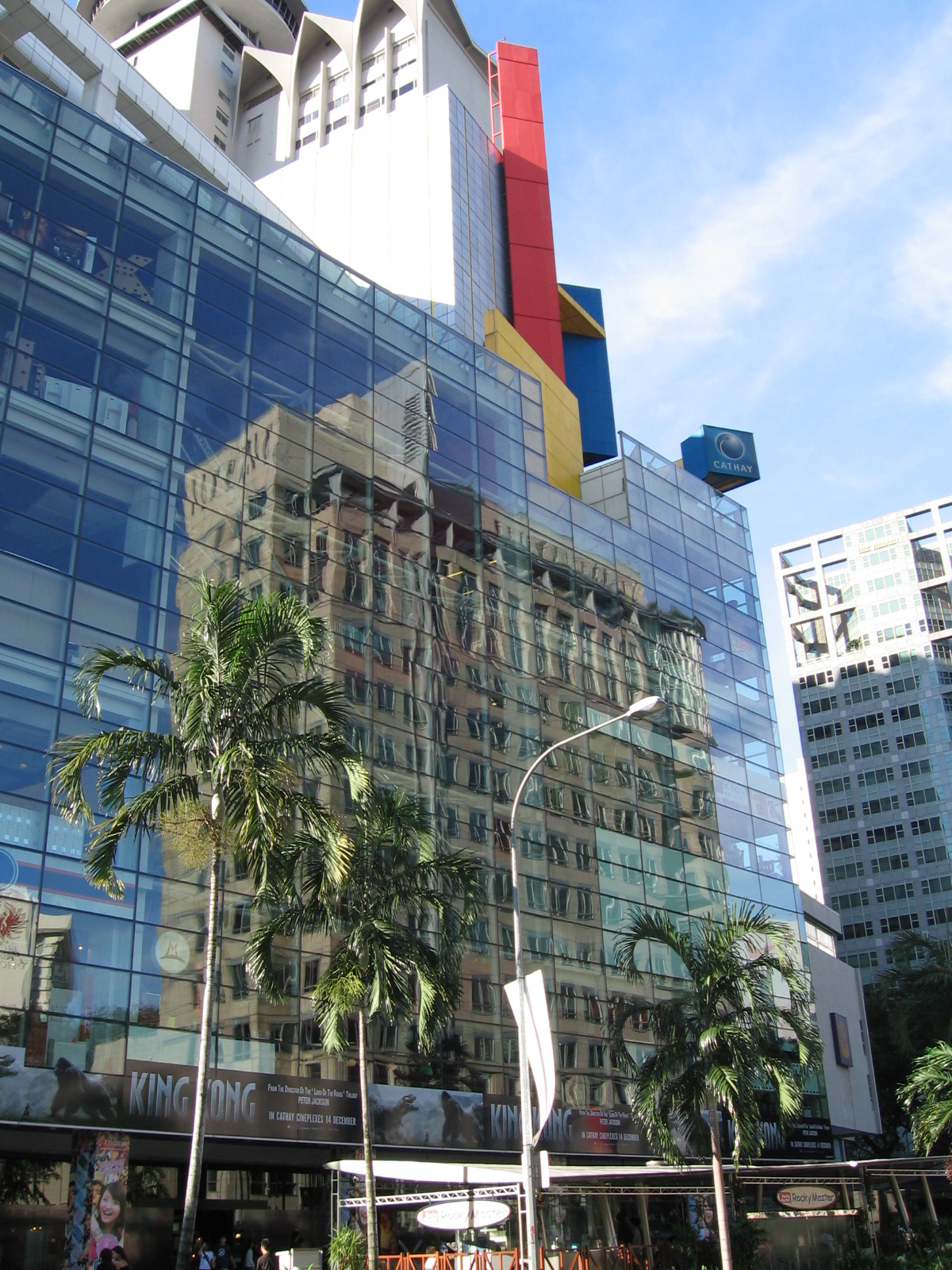
- Location: Singapore
- Coordinates: 1°18′05.4″N 103°50′11.1″E
- Address: 8 Grange Road, 239695
- Opened: 1997
- Developer: Cathay Organisation
- Manager: Cathay Organisation
- Owner: Cathay Organisation
- Num. of stores: 34
- Floors: 14
- Website: cineleisure.com.sg

Cathay Cineleisure Orchard is an urban mall located at 8 Grange Road, Singapore. The building is managed by Cathay Organisation.

== Background ==
The mall opened in October 1997 on the site of the previous building, the old Orchard Cinema, which was torn down in 1994.

The youth-oriented mall houses a mix of food and beverage outlets, fashion shops and a hair salon. It also includes an indoor trampoline park on Level 9.

Cathay Cineplex operated 12 movie screens in the mall but closed down on 30 June 2023. Golden Village and The Projector launched a new collaboration, Golden Village x The Projector (GVxTP), to take over the cinema space in the mall. The collaboration will feature three Golden Village-branded halls and three The Projector-branded halls.

The building has won accolades such as the "SIA-ICI (Singapore Institute of Architects - ICI Paints) Colour Award" for its creative use of colours in its building design. Two of its cinemas (Halls 3 and 6) were voted Singapore's best screens in a survey conducted by The Straits Times in April 1998. In another survey by Ad Post, readers voted Cathay Cineplex Orchard their "Favourite Cinema in Singapore".

== See also ==
- List of shopping malls in Singapore
