= Shaw Tower, Singapore =

Defunct commercial tower in Singapore

Shaw Tower
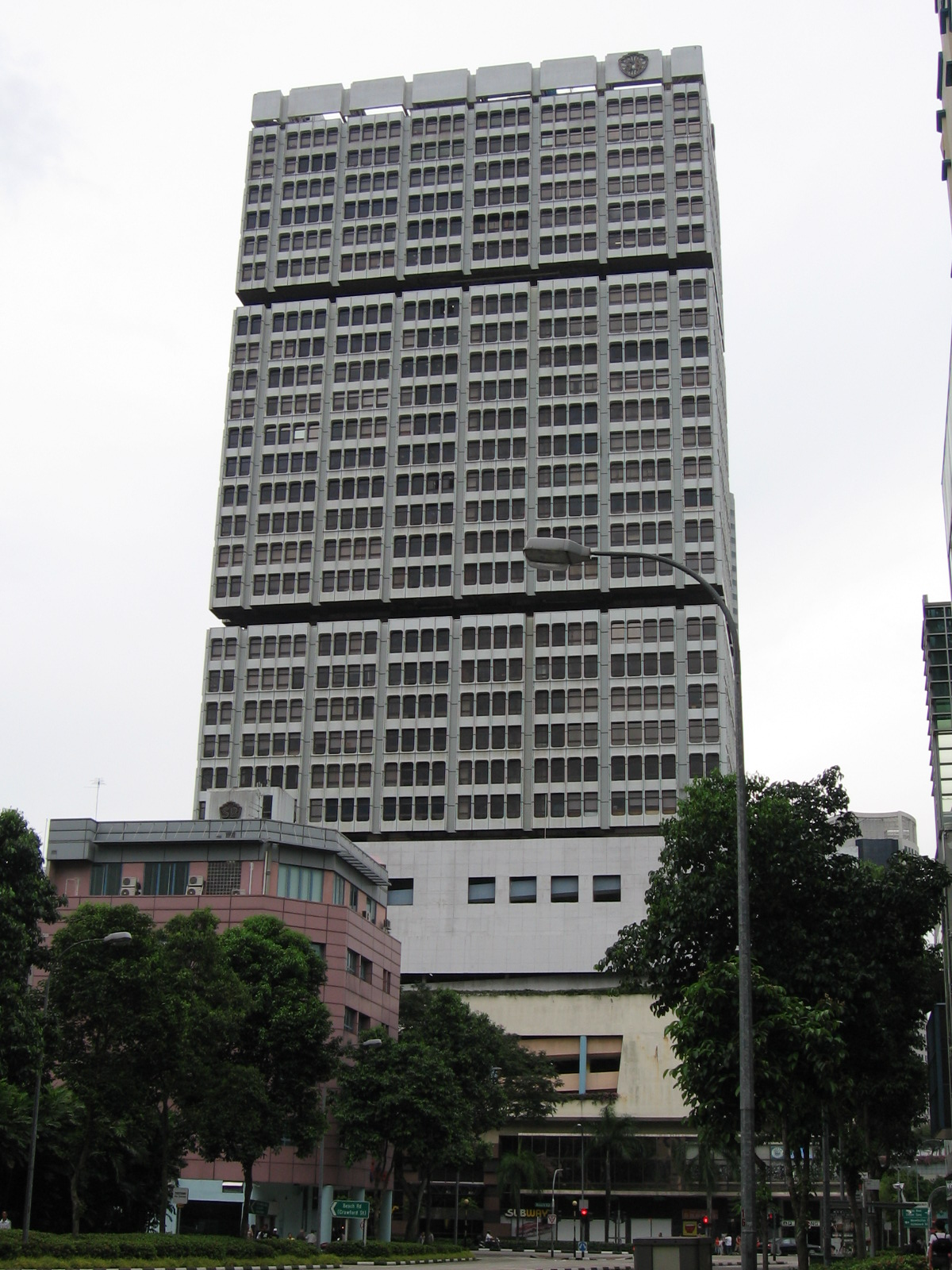
- Interactive map of the Shaw Tower area
- Former names: Shaw Mansion

General information
- Status: Demolished
- Architectural style: Brutalist
- Location: 100 Beach Road, Singapore 189702
- Coordinates: 1°17′48.2″N 103°51′24.7″E
- Completed: 1975; 51 years ago
- Demolished: 2020; 6 years ago
- Owner: Shaw Towers Realty Private Limited

Height
- Height: 134 meters (440 feet)

Technical details
- Floor count: 35
- Lifts/elevators: 13

Design and construction
- Architects: Iversen, van Sitteren & Partners

Website
- Shaw Towers

Shaw Tower, also sometimes referred to as Shaw Towers, was a defunct high-rise commercial building located on Beach Road in Singapore. At the time of its completion in 1975, the tower housed the largest cinema in Singapore.

The building was part of the Urban Redevelopment Authority’s plans in the 1960s to create a “Golden Mile” stretch of mixed-use buildings that merged living, work, and play.

== History ==
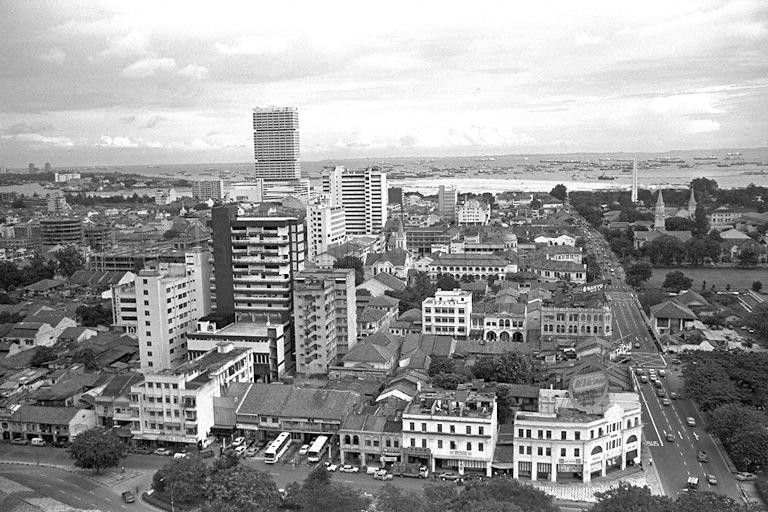
1976 bird's eye view of Bras Basah Road, showing how Shaw Tower (the tallest building in the background) was a landmark in the area at the time.

The construction of Shaw Tower was completed in 1975, on the site of the now-expunged Hoi How Road, and two previously existing cinemas: Alhambra Cinema and Marlborough Cinema.

Shaw Tower is owned and managed by Shaw Towers Realty, a subsidiary of Shaw Organisation. The project was previously referred to as Shaw Mansion in newspaper articles dated to as early as 1972, and was then reported to cost S$36 million.

Two cinemas managed by Shaw Theatres, Prince and Jade Theatres, opened inside the building shortly after it was built. They were located on two opposite ends of the building, with Prince facing Beach Road, and Jade angled towards Nicoll Highway. At the time of its opening, Prince was the largest cinema hall in Singapore.

In 1987, the cinemas underwent a S$12 million renovation by twinning them into four halls, a project consisting of adding a second screen into the circle seats in each cinema hall. This was followed by a seven-month renovation of the retail podium, which was renamed Shaw Leisure Gallery in 1989.

In 1996, both Prince and Jade cinemas were sold to American cinema chain United Artists, in which they were renamed Grand Prince/Alhambra and Royal Jade/Emerald respectively. Both cinemas were returned to Shaw Theatres in late 2001, when Shaw bought over United Artists operations in Singapore.

Jade Theatre switched to screening Hindi films in early 2006 and was subsequently renamed Screens of Bombay Talkies. It was acquired by Indian cinema chain Carnival Cinemas in early 2017.

Prince Theatre ceased operations in late 2008, as their large halls could not compete with other large multiplexes and their smaller halls. It was then leased to Rock Productions, the business arm of New Creation Church in 2012, and subsequently refurbished as Shine Auditorium.

=== Redevelopment ===
In 2018, the management of Shaw Tower gave notice to tenants to vacate the building's premises by June 2020, However, the last tenants vacated the building in July 2020 due to delays caused by Singapore's lockdown measures as a result of the COVID-19 outbreak earlier in April.

In October 2020, the building owners appointed Lendlease to manage the redevelopment, which will be synced with that of GuocoLand's Guoco Midtown. Construction will begin in late 2020 and was originally slated to be completed by 2024. At a height of 200m, the new 35-storey Shaw Tower is expected to have 450,000 sq ft of Grade A office space and 30,000 sq ft of retail space.

The redeveloped Shaw Tower opened in mid-2026. It will form an integral part of the Ophir-Rochor Corridor, a revamped, pedestrian-friendly, mixed-use district centred around Bugis MRT station.

== Architecture ==
The L-shaped floor area of Shaw Tower, with a narrow section angled towards Nicoll Highway, was due to the building being constructed upon the site of two demolished cinemas and the now-expunged Hoi How Road.

Shaw Tower was designed by Singaporean architect Charles Ho of Iversen, van Sitteren & Partners. The structure is Brutalist in style, featuring a podium-block-and-tower configuration. The former was designed as a retail space, while the latter was designated for offices. The multi-storey car park spanned the 3rd to the 11th floor. This gave the commercial space on the first two floors of Shaw Tower access to the street level.

The podium allowed Shaw Tower to align with the other low-rise shophouses that populated Beach Road at the time of its construction, while the high-rise tower made it a landmark in the area.

Internally, there was a close integration of movement of shoppers and cinema-goers, while the circulation for offices was kept separated. The office tower was additionally designed on a fixed module, allowing flexible partitioning of the space.

The tower portion of Shaw Tower is staggered into three parts, with patterned sun-shading panels made from precast concrete lining its facade.

== Gallery ==
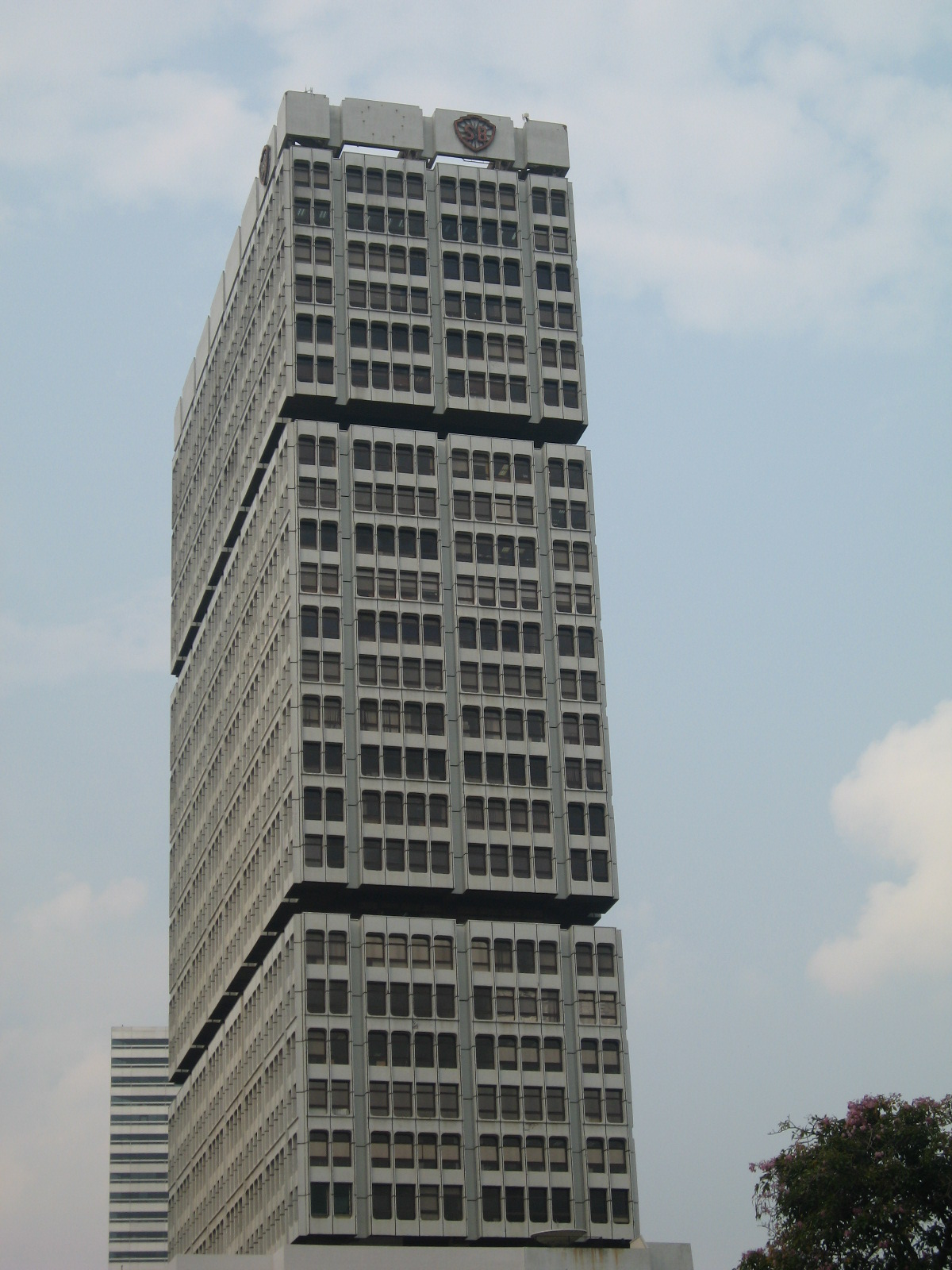
The tower of Shaw Tower, staggered into three sections.

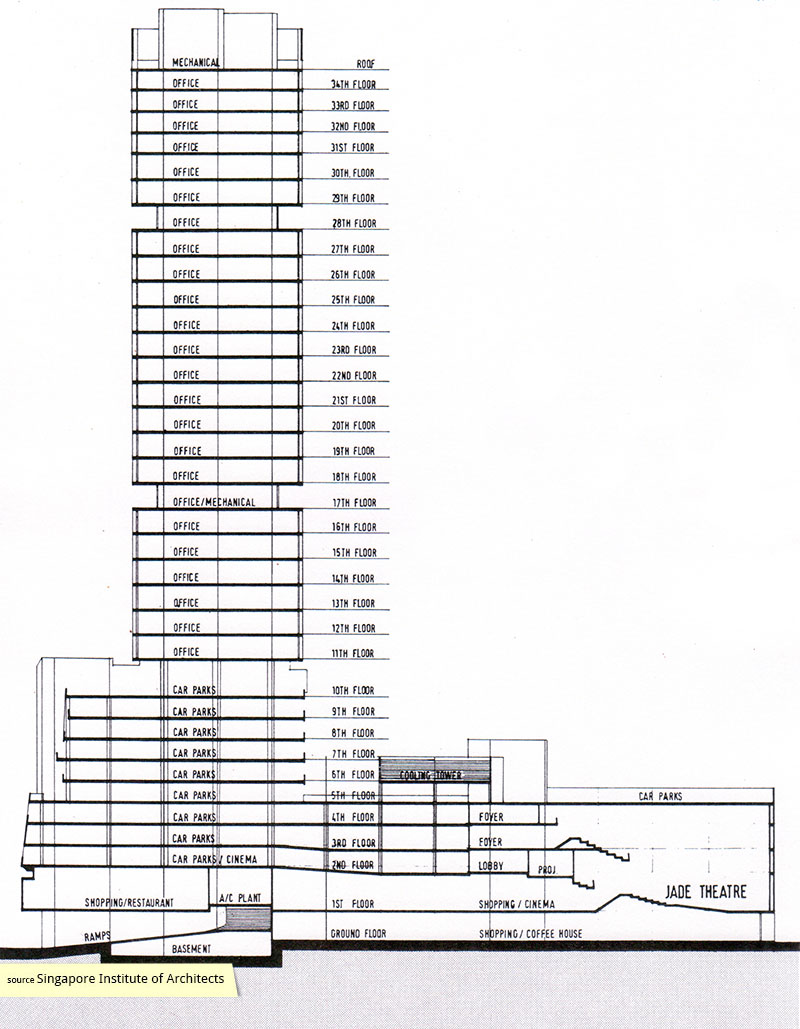
Section plan of Shaw Tower.

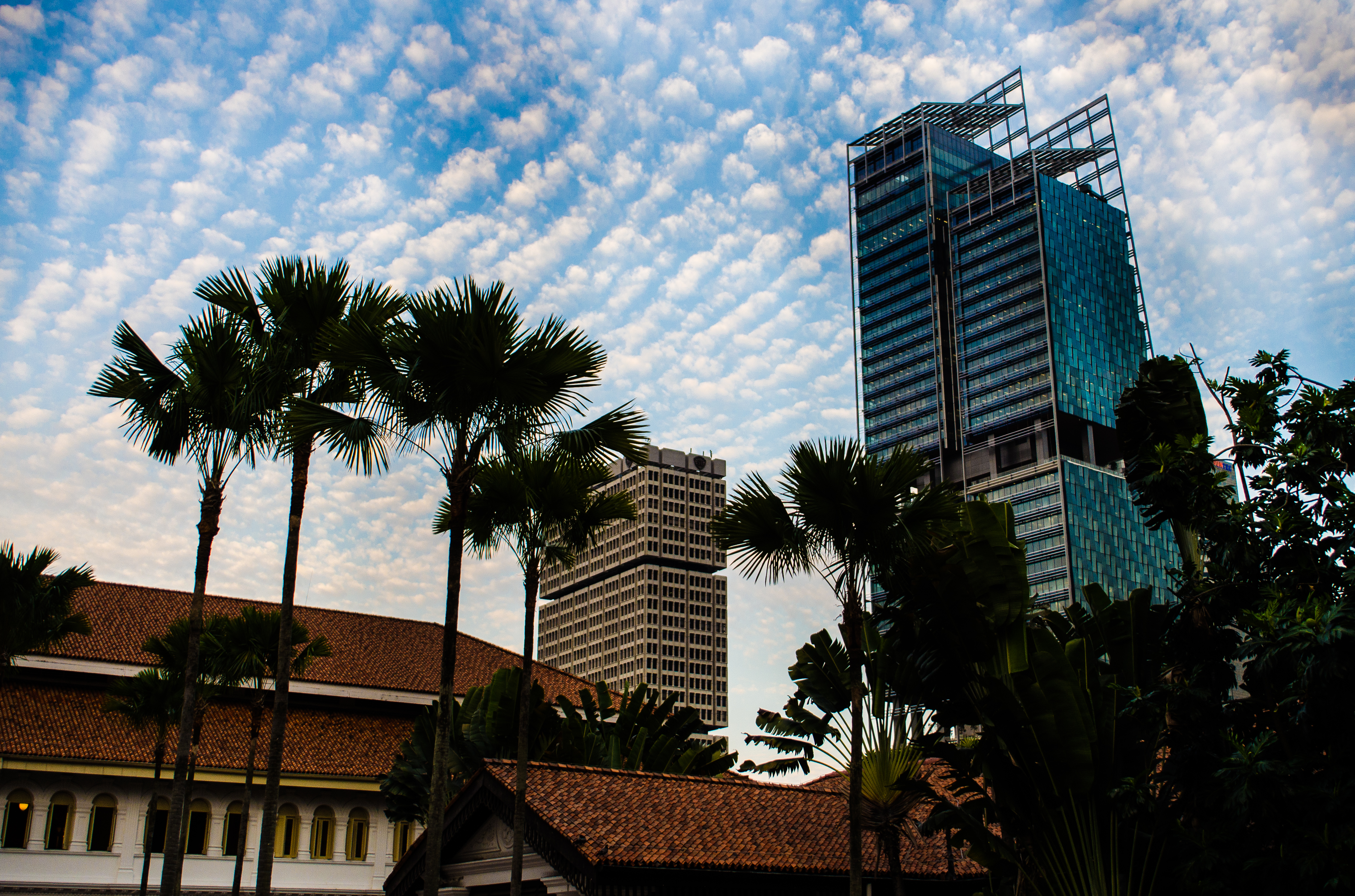
The newly constructed South Beach Tower in the foreground, with Shaw Tower in the distance.

== See also ==
- List of shopping malls in Singapore
