= Jurong Entertainment Centre =

Defunct Singapore shopping mall

Coordinates: 1°19′59.95″N 103°44′23.91″E

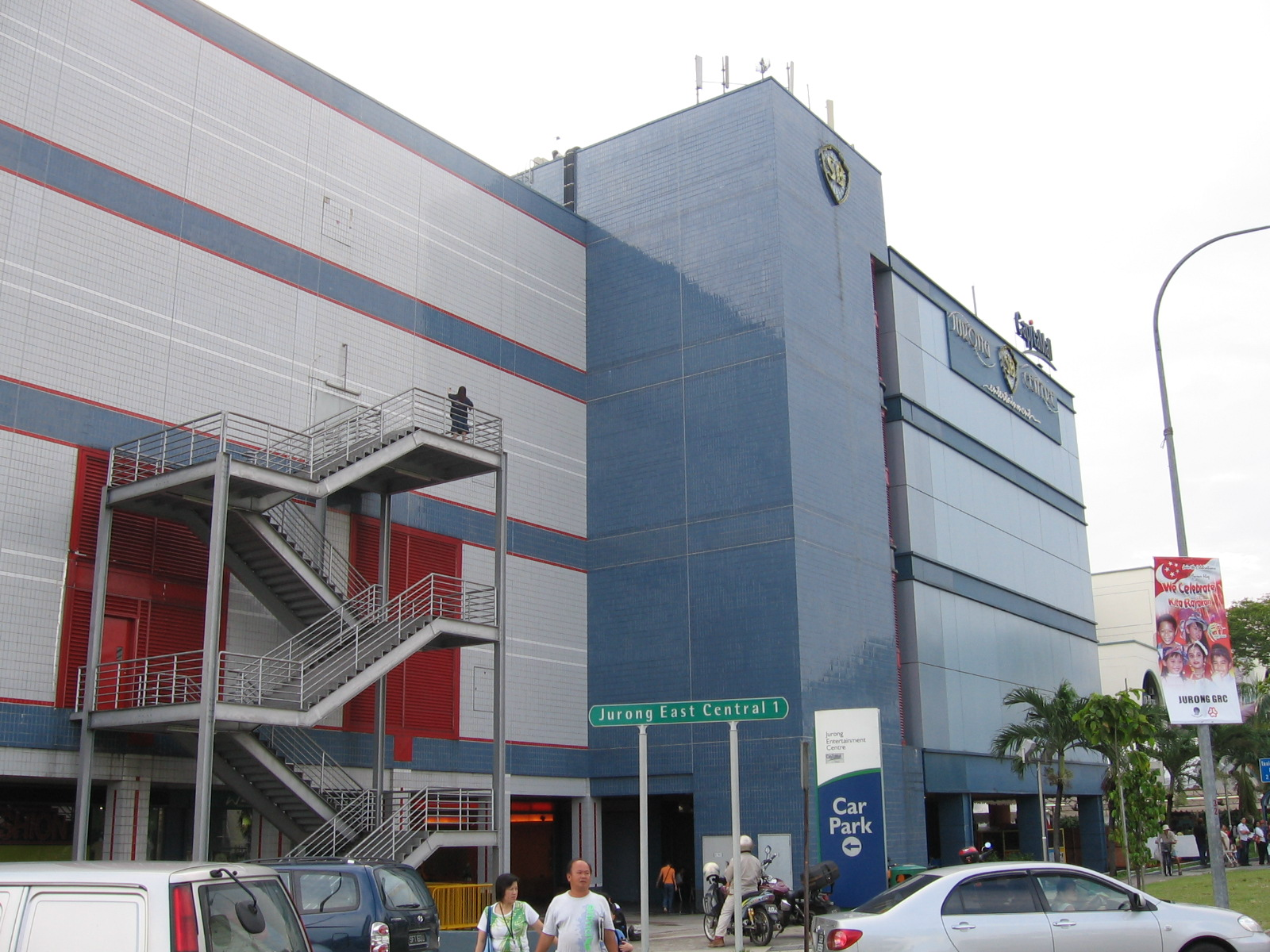
- Jurong Entertainment Centre in July 2006

- Location within Singapore

General information
- Location: Jurong East, Singapore, 2 Jurong East Central 1, Singapore 609731, Singapore
- Opened: 17 September 1993; 33 years ago
- Closed: 31 October 2008; 18 years ago
- Owner: Shaw Organisation (1993–2005); CapitaLand (2005–2010)
- Affiliation: Shaw Organisation

Technical details
- Floor count: 4
- Floor area: 110,000 square feet (10,000 m^{2})

Jurong Entertainment Centre was an entertainment centre once located at Jurong East, Singapore.

== Background ==
Opened in September 1993, the shopping centre was within walking distance from Jurong East MRT station. It had a net lettable retail floor area of 110,000 square feet (10,000 m^{2}), featuring a four-screen cineplex operated by Shaw Theatres, an amusement arcade, a bowling alley, some retail shops and eateries, and the Fuji Ice Palace on third floor, one of the only two ice rinks in Singapore.

In 2000, two more screens were added to the existing four-screen cineplex.

=== Redevelopment ===
The Jurong Entertainment Centre was acquired by CapitaMall Trust Management Limited for S$68 million in 2005. It was closed for redevelopment in October 2008 and was expected to be completed by 2011.

The S$138.2 million asset enhancement work planned to house Singapore's first Olympic-size ice skating rink measuring 60m by 30m with a 460-seat gallery for spectators. Other asset enhancement includes a newly created floor to which the present cineplex was relocated. The retail space on all floors was also reconfigured so as to maximise the efficiency at the mall. In addition, a rooftop landscaped garden was constructed on the top level.

=== Demolition ===
Due to the 2008 financial crisis and high construction costs, the redevelopment programme was delayed. The building was completely demolished in February 2010.

On 21 May 2010, CapitaMall Trust held a groundbreaking ceremony for its new mall on the site of the former Jurong Entertainment Centre.

The 204,000 square feet (19,000 m^{2}) new mall, named JCube, comprises five levels of retail, two basement levels of car park and a rooftop landscaped plaza. JCube started welcoming shoppers on 2 April 2012. However, on 7 August 2023, it was officially shut down for demolition as the site was planned to be redeveloped into a condominium called J'Den. The condominium is a 40-storey building with shops below. J'Den is expected to be completed by 2027-2028 with permanent completion by 2028-2029 and is managed by CapitaMalls Asia.
