= Carnival Cinemas =

Indian multiplex cinema chain

- Company type: Private
- Industry: Entertainment
- Founded: 2010; 16 years ago in Angamaly, Kochi, India
- Founder: Dr. Shrikant Bhasi
- Headquarters: Mumbai, Maharashtra, India
- Area served: India
- Key people: Vishal Sawhney (CEO); Rajesh Chalke (Group CFO); Mubashir MB Malik (Chief Growth StrategistCGS)
- Parent: Carnival Group
- Website: www.carnivalcinemas.com

Carnival Cinemas was a multiplex chain based in India. It is a part of Carnival Group India, a business chain headed by Shrikant Bhasi.

== Growth and Expansion ==
Carnival Cinemas' first theatre in Angamaly was built on the top floor of a bus terminal complex. Further the company expanded to Kerala and Tamil Nadu, and eventually to the rest of India.

In 2014 Carnival Cinemas acquired HDIL's Broadway Cinema chain, which had screens across Mumbai, Delhi and Indore. In 2015, Carnival Cinemas acquired Big Cinemas by purchasing the 100% stake of Reliance MediaWorks Ltd for around ₹700 crores. Subsequently, all the Big Cinemas multiplex screens were re-branded as Carnival Cinemas by 2016. As a result of the merger, Carnival had operations in 20 states: Kerala, Chhattisgarh, Karnataka, Tamil Nadu, Andhra Pradesh, Telangana, Maharashtra, Madhya Pradesh, Rajasthan, Punjab, Gujarat, Haryana, Delhi NCR, Jharkhand, Uttar Pradesh, Uttarakhand, West Bengal, Assam, Bihar, Himachal Pradesh and Goa with 470 screens in 120 locations.

There were plans to double the screen count to 1000 screens by 2023.

In the late 2010s, Carnival Cinemas also expanded their branding outside India to operate a few locations across Singapore.

== Decline ==
Due to the COVID-19 pandemic, Carnival Cinemas was unable to continue operations in a sustainable manner and ended in debt.

All Carnival Cinemas locations across India have been permanently closed, marking the end of the brand's operations nationwide. Several former Carnival Cinemas properties have since re-opened under new management, including chains such as INOX-PVR, MovieMax and Miraj Cinemas.

== Initiatives ==
- Carnival Cinemas, had started initiative, direct from farm to home delivery, under brand name "Farmse Fresh", to support as livelihood source for their staff during Covid lockdown.
- This has also been permanently closed.

== See also ==
- Shrikant Bhasi
