= JCube =

Former shopping mall in Singapore

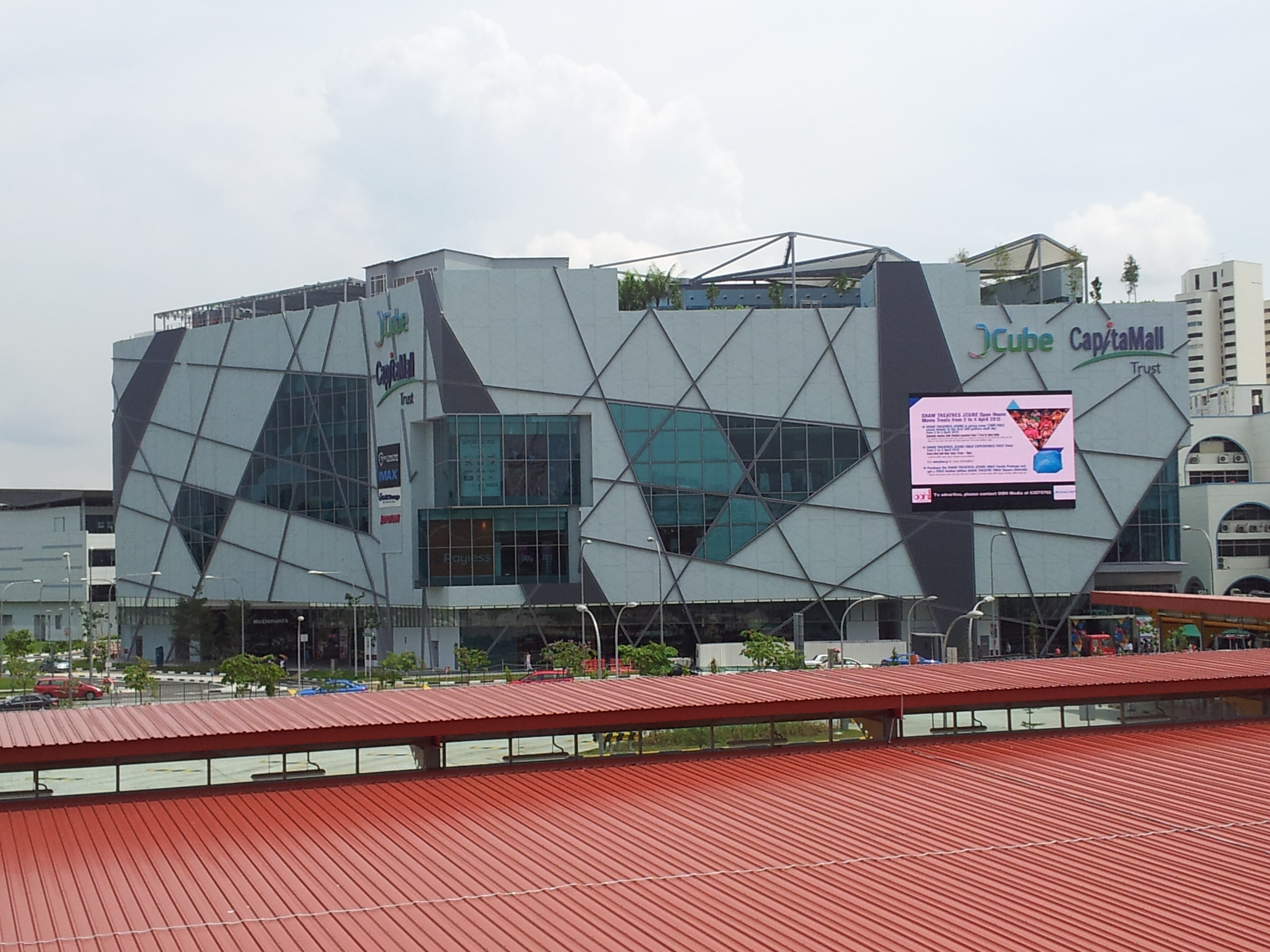
- JCube, from Jurong East MRT station.
- Location: Jurong East, Singapore
- Coordinates: 1°19′59.95″N 103°44′23.91″E
- Address: 2 Jurong East Central 1, Singapore 609731
- Opened: 2 April 2012; 14 years ago
- Closed: 7 August 2023; 3 years ago
- Manager: CapitaMalls Asia
- Owner: CapitaMall Trust
- Num. of stores: 154
- Floor area: 210,000 square feet (20,000 m^{2})
- Floors: 6
- Parking: 340
- Public transit: NS1 EW24 Jurong East

JCube was a shopping centre located in Jurong East, Singapore, that operated from 2 April 2012 to 6 August 2023. It used to house an Olympic-size ice rink and Singapore's first IMAX theatre in the suburbs. It was built on the former site of the Jurong Entertainment Centre.

JCube was owned by CapitaLand Integrated Commercial Trust before it was acquired by CapitaLand Development in 1Q 2022. During JCube's operations, the mall was managed by CapitaLand Retail Management (a wholly owned subsidiary of CapitaLand Investment).

== History ==
Prior to its construction, Jurong Entertainment Centre, a shopping centre, was located on its current site. It was closed for redevelopment in October 2008 and was expected to be completed by 2011. However, due to the 2008 financial crisis and high construction costs, the redevelopment programme was delayed. The building was completely demolished in February 2010.

On 21 May 2010, CapitaMall Trust held a groundbreaking ceremony for its new mall on the site of the former Jurong Entertainment Centre. The 204,000 square feet (19,000 m^{2}) new mall, named JCube, comprised five levels of retail, two basement levels of car park and a rooftop landscaped plaza.

The name, JCube was decided on after a naming competition held in 2010. J represented the mall's location in Jurong, while Cube represented what JCube was designed to look like - an ice cube. It was co-designed by RSP Architects and Benoy.

In 2012, CapitaLand and Singapore Sports Council jointly opened a non-profit Olympic-size ice skating rink, The Rink.

JCube opened and welcomed shoppers on 2 April 2012 and was managed by CapitaMalls Asia.

Due to the opening of Jem and Westgate and declining number of shoppers, J.Avenue, located on Level 2 of JCube, was launched on 6 September 2014. J.Avenue was mainly targeted at the young, and to keep them returning, retail concepts would be constantly updated throughout the year. There were trick art installations so that people could take selfies with interesting backgrounds. Since their target audience, the young, were more tech-savvy, J.Avenue also launched an online portal, featuring some merchandise available at the stores in J.Avenue.

On 24 January 2022, CapitaLand Development (CLD), the development arm of CapitaLand Group, announced that it had entered into a sale and purchase agreement to acquire JCube from CapitaLand Integrated Commercial Trust.

JCube closed on 6 August 2023.

== Green initiatives ==
In 2011, JCube was awarded the Green Mark Platinum award by the Building and Construction Authority in Singapore. It was estimated that the mall saved 7,793,984 kWh/year in energy and 3,419m3/year in water.

== Redevelopment ==
On 7 February 2023, CapitaLand Development announced that it would be redeveloping the JCube site into a 40-storey residential development with commercial space on the first and second storeys. Targeted for completion in 2027, the new development, J’Den, will complement the government's plans to bring new homes – alongside new businesses, recreational facilities and amenities – to the Jurong Lake District (JLD). J’Den will be directly connected to the Jurong East MRT interchange station, Westgate and IMM Building via J-Walk, the covered elevated pedestrian network in JLD.
