= Big Cinemas =

Indian movie theatre chain (now dissolved)

- Type: Public
- Industry: Entertainment (Cinema Chain)
- Founded: 2001
- Defunct: 2016
- Fate: Sold and merged into Carnival Cinemas
- Successor: Carnival Cinemas
- Headquarters: Mumbai, Maharashtra
- Key people: Ashok Ganapaty, CEO, Reliance MediaWorks
- Parent: Reliance MediaWorks (Reliance ADA Group) (2001–15); Carnival Cinemas (2015–2016)
- Website: http://www.bigcinemas.com/

Big Cinemas was an Indian movie theater chain. It was a division of Anil Ambani’s Reliance MediaWorks Ltd (formerly known as Adlabs Films Limited) and a member of Reliance ADA Group.

== History ==
It was a multiplex theatre chain with over 515 screens in India, US, Malaysia, and the Netherlands. As of July 2014, the company had 280 screens in India. As of 2010, the company was third-largest cinema chain in Malaysia and featured Hollywood as well as Chinese and Tamil films. In India Big Cinemas are mostly seen in the state of Maharashtra with its multiplex outlets even in semi-developed cities and small towns. Big Cinemas has its outlets in cities like Mumbai, Pune, Jalandhar, New Delhi, Delhi NCR, Nashik, Nagpur, Indore, Aurangabad, Solapur, Nanded, Latur and Mangalore.

The most famous Big Cinemas Theatre was Big Cinemas, Wadala (IMAX) in Mumbai which is the world's largest dome shaped Theatre. In mid-2009, the company partnered with Pathé Theatres to set up three screens in Netherlands. In 2015 Reliance MediaWorks Ltd sold its 100% stake to Kerala-based Carnival Cinemas for around ₹700 crores. Subsequently, all the Big Cinemas multiplex screens were re-branded as Carnival Cinemas by 2016.

== Gallery ==
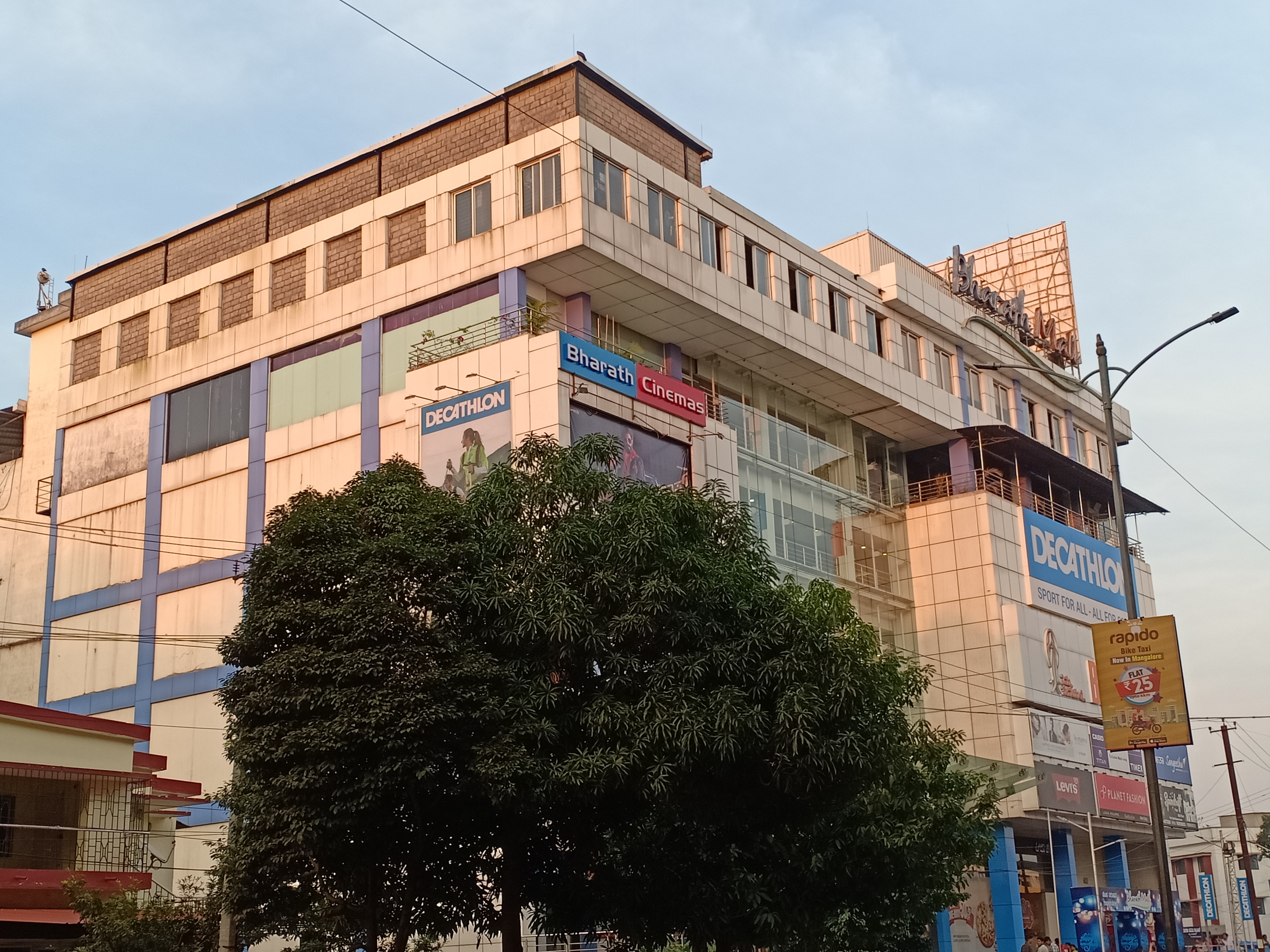
Big Cinemas collab with Bharath Group, Mangaluru

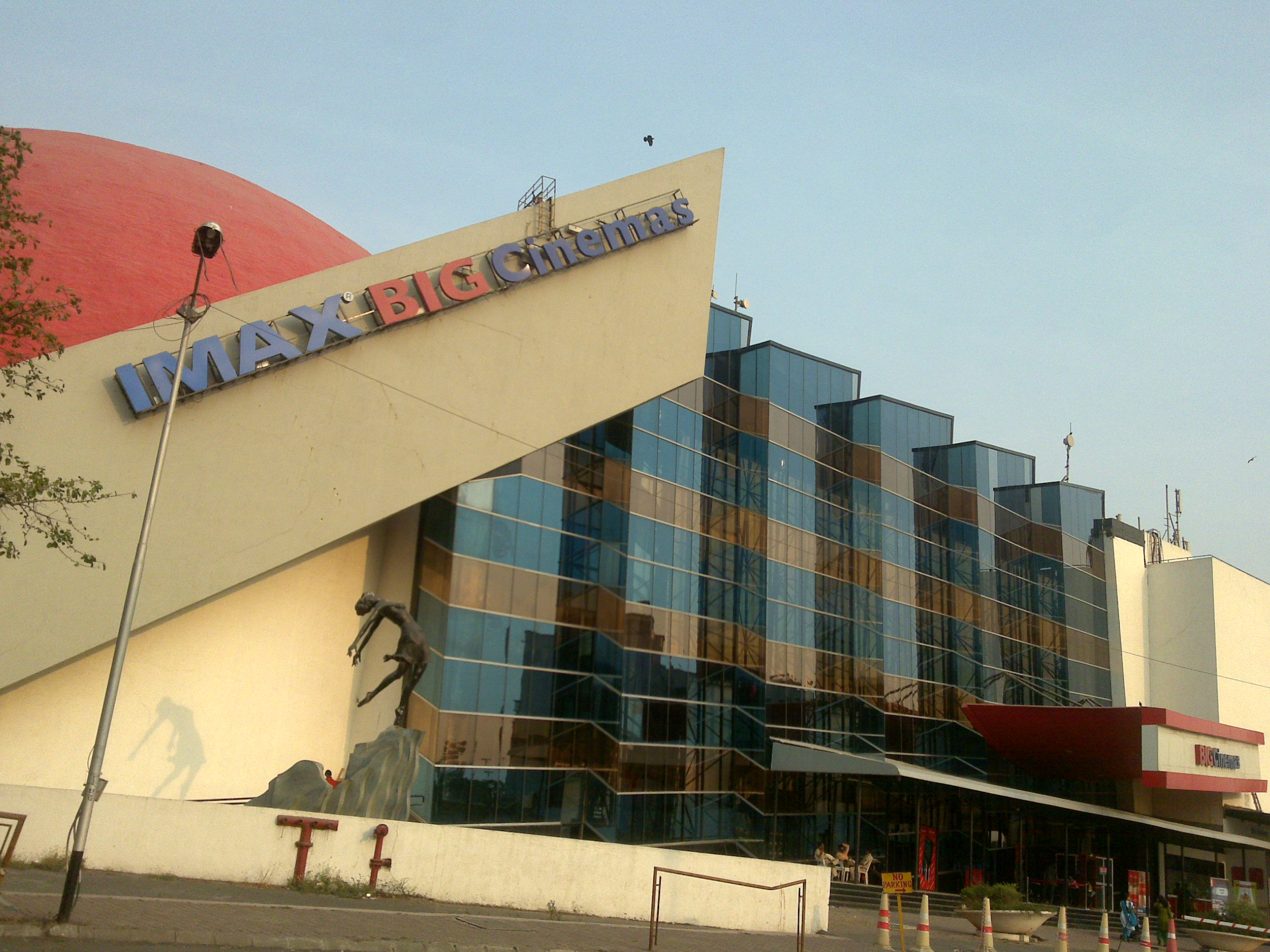
BIG Cinemas - IMAX (March 2010)

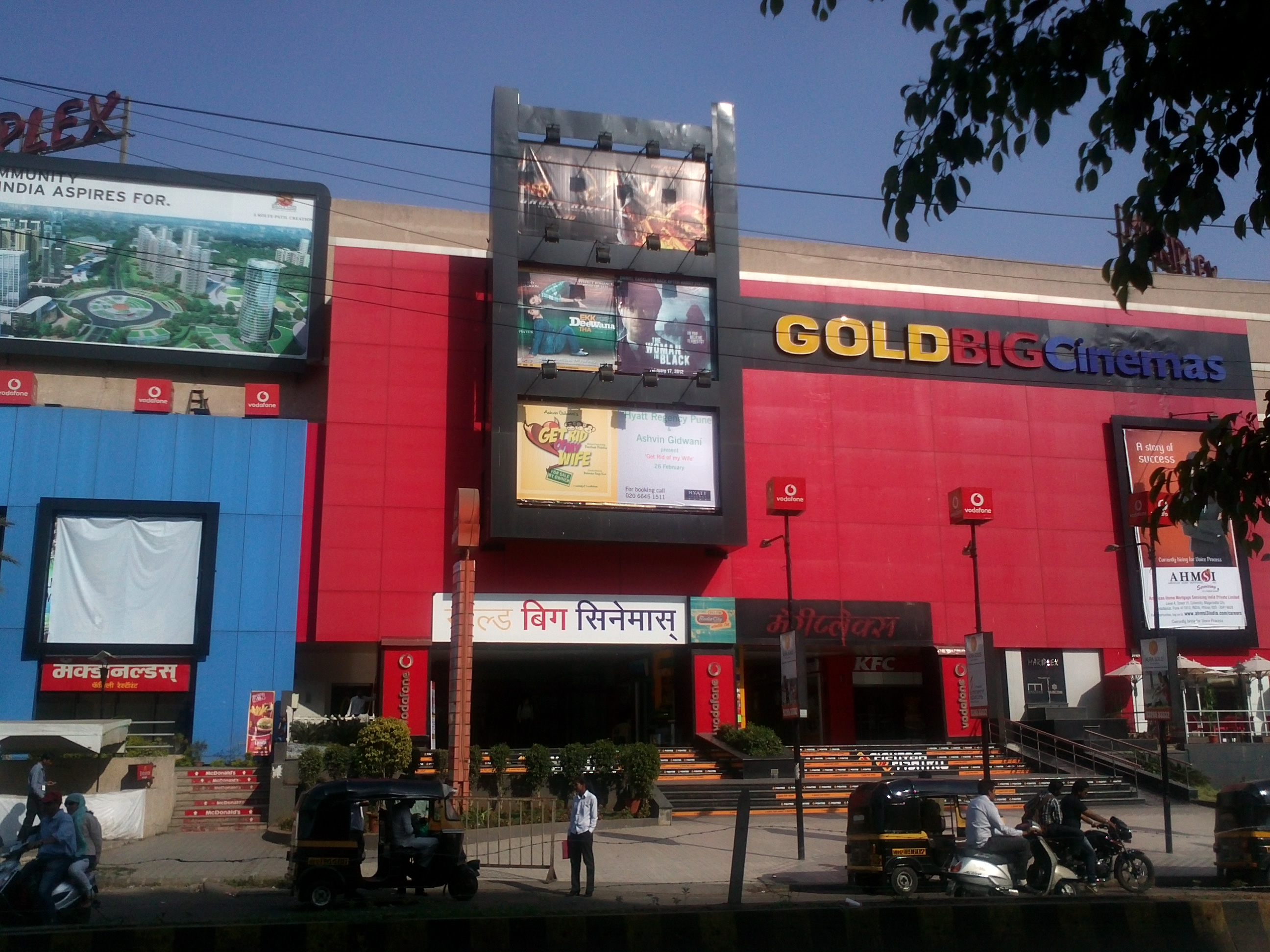
BIG Cinemas, Kalyaninagar, Pune (February 2012)

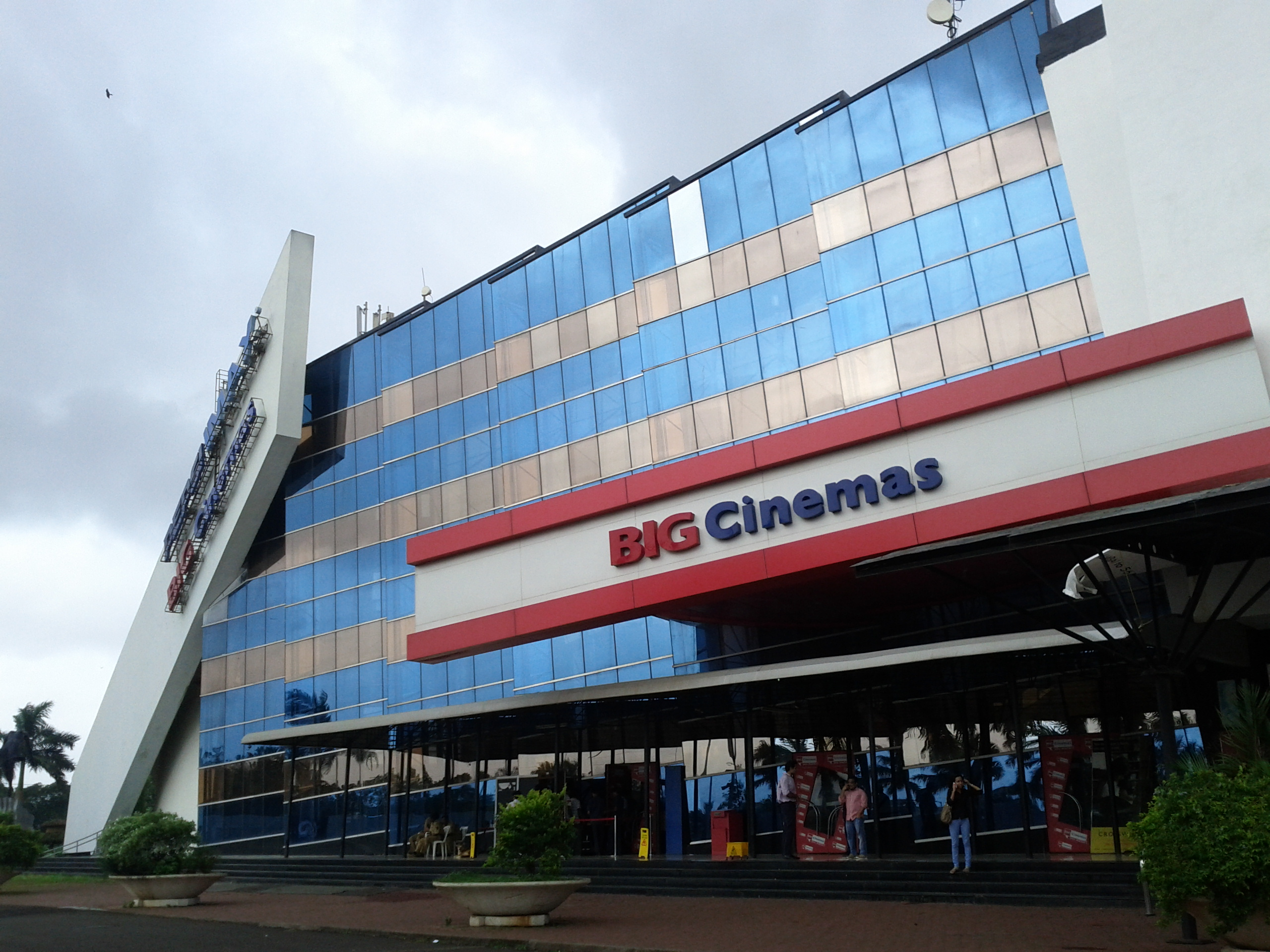
BIG Cinemas, Wadala, Mumbai (July 2012)

== See also ==
- CineMAX
- PVR Cinemas
- INOX Movies
- SPI Cinemas
