= List of Hong Kong films before 1950 =

A list of the earliest films produced in Hong Kong from the first film in 1909 to 1949 in year order.

Title	Director	Cast	Genre	Notes
1909
Stealing the Roast Duck	Liang Shaobo	Liang Shaobo, Lai Pak-hoi	Comedy short	First dramatic film production in Hong Kong, made by Asia Film Company of Shanghai.
1913
Zhuangzi Tests His Wife	Lai Pak-hoi	Lai Man-Wai, Lai Pak-hoi	Comedy short	First film made by a Hong Kong studio, but never screened in Hong Kong.
1922
Rouge	Lai Man-Wai, Lai Pak-hoi	Lai Man-Wai, Lim Cho Cho	Drama	First feature film produced by a Hong Kong company (China Sun), but shot in Guangzhou.
1925–30
No films were made in Hong Kong as a result of the Great Canton–Hong Kong strike.
1931
Iron Bone and Orchid Heart	Kwan Man-ching	Yao-yu Sek, Kit-ching Fung	Romance	
The Pain of Separation	Lai Pak-hoi	Kin-han Lap, Wah-chi Cheung	Romance	First Hong Kong film adapted from a Cantonese folk tale/opera
The Witty Sorcerer	Lai Pak-hoi	Lai Pak-hoi, Xu Menghen	Comedy/Drama	
1932
Cry of the Cuckoo in the Temple	Liang Shaobo	Wong Man-lei	Fable	
Gunshot at Midnight	Kwan Man-ching	Ng Cho-fan, Wong Man-lei	Mystery	
1933
Conscience	Lai Pak-hoi			First partial talkie.
Flowers Fall and Catkins Fly	Wong Toi		Romance	Filmed in Vietnam, this was the first HK film shot at an overseas location, but never released in Hong Kong.
The Fool Pays Respects	Hou Yao	Wong Man-lei	Fantasy	Based on a Cantonese folk tale
The Shining Pearl	Kwan Man-ching	Ng Cho-fan, Wong Man-lei	Action	
1934
The Fool's Nuptial Chamber	Lai Pak-hoi			First full talkie.
The Body Snatchers	Wong Toi	Ng Cho-fan	Horror	Hong Kong's first horror film
Mourning of the Chaste Tree Flower	Runje Shaw, Runme Shaw, Runde Shaw	Pak Kui-Wing, Woo Tip-Ying, Tai Hau-Ho	Drama	
1935
Life Line	Guan Wenqing			
The Modern Bride	Kwan Man-ching	Lam Kwan-San, Lee Yi-Nin, Yip Yan-Foo	Comedy	
Opera Stars and Song Girls	Kwan Ting-Yam	Tse Sing-Nong, Tam Yuk-Lan, Ma Kam-Neong, Tam Siu-Fung	Cantonese opera	
Scent of Wild Flowers	So Yi	Ma Sze-Tsang, Tam Lan-Hing, William Ko Wai-Lim, Tam Yuk-Lan, Kwong Shan-Siu, Lam Mui-mui	Drama	First film directed by So Yi.
Yesterday's Song (aka Voice of the Broken-hearted)	Chiu Shu-San	Kwan Tak-Hing, Lee Yi-Nin, Wong Man-lei, Lam Mui-mui	Drama	
1936
House Number 66 (aka The Case of the Dismembered Body)	Lee Tit	Tong Sing-To, Wu Yung, Cheng Lau-Kuen	Drama	
New Youth	So Yi	Ng Cho-Fan, Wong Man-lei, Nancy Chan	Drama	
Sum Hun	Esther Eng			
1937
The Light of Women	Go Lee-Han	Lee Yi-Nin, Leong Tim-Tim, Leung Chui-Mei, Fok Suet-Yee, To Sam-Ku	War	
The Magnificent Country	Chan Tin	Ng Cho-Fan, Yin Pak, Lam Lai-Ping	War	
Producing Citizens	Lee Fa	Kwong Shan-Siu, Lam Mui-mui, Tai Hau-Ho, Lee Yuet-ching, Fok Suet-Yee	Drama	
The Sentimental Woman	So Yi, Liu Shut	Leong Suet-Fei, Lee Yi-Nin, Kwong Shan-Siu, Chu Po-Chuen, Ho Tai-So, Mui Yee	Romance	
Spring Flower and Autumn Moon	Cheung Oi-Man	Violet Wong, Lam Mui-mui, Wu Mei-Lun	Musical	
Sweetie	Yeung Kung-Leung	Tam Yuk-Lan, Ching Siu-Fung, Chu Ying-Mui	Cantonese opera	
1938
A Mother's Tears (Chinese: 慈母淚)	Chiu Shu-San	To Yu, Wong Sau-Nin, Chan Tin-Chung, Wu Tip-Lai, Yuet-ching Lee	Drama	Released 25 May 1938.
To Lei Chang Chun				
Ou Sui Sing Chi				
Mei Yan Kuk				
Behind the Shanghai Front Line	Tang Xiaodan			
Great Wall of Blood and Flesh	Hou Yao		National defence	Patriotic film against Japanese invasion
Incident in the Pacific	Hou Yao	Lee Yi-Nin, Lo Ban-Chiu, Chow Siu-Ying	War	
Last Minute Call	Hou Yao		National defence	Patriotic film against Japanese invasion
Female Soldier				
Eighth Heaven			Musical	
The Purple Cups	Hou Yao	Leong Suet-Fei, Yung Yuk-Yi, Yung Siu-Yi, Chow Siu-Ying, To Sam-Ku	Drama	
Rouge Tears	Chuk Ching-yin	Hu Die	Drama	Cantonese remake of 1934 silent The Goddess
Rouge Tears	Wu Yonggang	Hu Die	Drama	Mandarin remake of 1934 silent The Goddess
Shanghai Under Fire (Chinese: 上海火線後)	Chiu Shu-San	Yin Pak, Lee Ching	War	Released 9 June 1938.
1939
It's a Woman's World (aka The Thirty-six Amazons)	Esther Ng Gam-Ha, Liu Shut	Violet Wong, Tai Hau-Ho, Wu Mei-Lun, Wu Tip-Lai, Ha Bo-Lin, To Sam-Ku, Chan Sin-Yue, Chan Pooi-Choh, Tong Lee-Lee, Mui Yee	Drama	
Judge Bao Vs. the Eunuch	Wan Hoi-Leng, Hung Chung-Ho	Tsang Sam-To, Leong Suet-Fei, Ma Kam-Neong	Historical Drama	
Lone Island Paradise	Cai Chusheng	Li Lili	National defence	Mandarin film produced by the Shanghai exiles from the Second Sino-Japanese War.
The Luminescent Cup	Go Lee-Han, Yeung Tin-Lok	Lee Yi-Nin, Chow Siu-Ying, Yung Siu-Yi	Drama	
The Radio Station Murder Case		Xu Xinyuan	Detective	The Charlie Chan series.
Rivals in Love	So Yi	Cheung Ying, Tam Lan-Hing, Violet Wong, Tsi Law-lin	Drama	
The Seductive Empress Now and Then	Hung Chung-Ho	Kwong Shan-Siu, Ma Kam-Neong	Drama	
Storm over the Pacific	Hou Yao		National defence	Patriotic film against Japanese invasion
1940
The Boundless Future	Cai Chusheng			
The Love of a Woman (Chinese: 潘巧雲)	Wang Yin	Wang Yin	Drama	
The Red Scarf	Sung Gim-Chiu	Pak Yin, Kwong Shan-Siu, Fung Fung, Ling Mung, Chao Fei-Fei, To Sam-Ku, Chow Siu-Ying, Ho Lai-Wan	Romance	Film debut for Star Film Company.
The Seductive Woman	Lee Tit	Pak Yin, Cheung Ying, Wu Mei-Lun, Tai Hau-Ho, Ha Bo-Lin, To Sam-Ku	Romance	
White Clouds of Home	Situ Huimin			
1941
A Mother's Madness (aka Dianpo Xun Zai)	Wong Fook-Hing	Tam Lan-Hing, Sun-Ma Sze-Tsang, Yung Yuk-Yi, To Sam-Ku	Drama	
Chaos in the Universe	Cheung Oi-Man	Yee Chau-Sui, Chu Po-Chuen, Yung Yuk-Yi, Leung Sing-Bor	Comedy	
Golden Gate Girl	Esther Eng	Bruce Lee	Drama	Film debut of Bruce Lee (as an infant).
The Metropolis	Lai Ban	Lai Cheuk-cheuk, Cheung Ying, Wu Tip-lai, Lee Sun-fung, Yuet-ching Lee	Drama	
Roar of the People	Tang Xiao-Dan	Cheung Ying, Fung Fung, Wong Aau, Chan Tin-Chung, Fung Ying-Seung, Ng Wui, Lee Dan-Lo, Leung Miu-Sik, Walter Tso Tat-Wah, Ko Lo-Chuen	War	
1942
The Rich House	Hung Suk-Wan	Cheung Wood-Yau, Liu Ming, Yung Yuk-Yi	Drama	
The Battle of Hong Kong			War propaganda	The only film made during the Japanese occupation of Hong Kong.
1944
1946
The Entangling Ones	Chiu Shu-San	Wong Hok-Sing, Kwun-Ling Chow, Wong Chiu-Miu	Comedy	
1947
A Wealthy Family	Yam Wu-Fa	Ng Cho-Fan, Ng Dan-Fung, Lee Lan, Tsi Po-To, Yee Chau-Sui, Fung Ying-Seung, Ma Siu-Ying, Cheng Kwun-Min, Fung Pak-Wah, To Mei-Mei, Leung Ming, Keung Chung-Ping, Sin Kong	Comedy	
Cuckoo's Spirit in March	Hung Suk-Wan	Ng Cho-Fan, Yu Lai-Zhen	Drama	
The Distressed Lover		Cheung Wood-Yau, Yung Siu-Yi, Yung Yuk-Yi, Fung Ying-Seung, Wu Mei-Lun	Chinese Opera	
The Evil Mind	Wu Pang	Wong Man-Lei, Siu Yin-Fei, Leung Ying, Ma Siu-Ying, To Sam-Ku	Drama	
The Fickle Lady	Mok Hong-See	Ng Cho-Fan, Wong Man-lei, Yung Siu-Yi, To Mei-Mei, Lee Sin-Pan, Lee Yuet-Ching	Drama	
Happy Wedding	Chiang Wai-Kwong	Kwun-Ling Chow, Wong Chiu-Miu	Comedy, Cantonese opera	
Lucky Bride	Chiu Shu-San	Mak Bing-Wing, Kwun-Ling Chow, Luk Wan-Fei	Drama	
The Net of Justice		Xu Xinyuan	Detective	The Charlie Chan series.
Prostituting to Raise the Orphan	Hung Chung-Ho	Cheung Yuet-Yee, Sun-Ma Sze-Tsang, Lau Hak-Suen, Lam Ka-Sing, Ko Lo-Chuen, To Sam-Ku, Lee Sin-Pan, Cheng Bo-Yin	Cantonese opera	
Romance of the West Chamber	Yeung Kung-Leung	Pak Yuk-Tong, Lee Suet-Fong, Wong Man-Lei, Kwai Ming-Yang, Cheung Yuet-Yee, Siu Yin-Fei, Kam Yi, Yiu Ping, Ma Siu-Ying, Lau Kwai-Hong, Tsi Hau-Tsat, Lam Ka-Sing, Chao Fei-Fei	Historical Drama Cantonese opera	
Unforgetable Love	So Yi, Chu Kei	Ma Sze-Tsang, Hung Sin-Nui, Lau Hak-Suen, Yip Ping, Siu Wong-Ang, Ling Mung, Ko Lo-Chuen, Law Mo-Lan, Wong Sau-Nin, Lai Ming, Ng Tung, Fung Ying-Seung, Tang Mei-Mei	Romance	The only film produced by Gam Luen (Jinying) Film Company.
Unpredictable Tomorrow	Yam Wu-Fa	Sun-Ma Sze-Tsang, Siu Yin-Fei, Yee Chau-Sui, Wu Mei-Lun, Ma Siu-Ying, Tsi Po-To, Leung Ying, Bai Yang, Sin Kong, Keung Chung-Ping, To Sam-Ku, Cheng Kwun-Min	Drama	
1948
Charlie Chan Outwits the Black Despot		Xu Xinyuan	Detective	The Charlie Chan series.
The Crazy Match-maker (aka The Crazy Matchmaker, Woman Dismantles White)	Lo Duen	Wong Chiu-Miu, Tsi Law-Lin, Lo Duen, Chan Yeuk-Ho, Lee Yuet-Ching, Tang Chuk-Kwun, Yip Chuen-Wah, Ho Bik-Kin, Fong Yeung, Fung Ging-Man, Wong Gam, Lau Ming, Hark Yan	Drama	Debut for Sei Hoi (Sihai) Film Company, a film production company.
Four Phoenixes Take Flight	Cho Kei	Fung Fung, Yung Siu-Yi, Tsi Po-To, Ng Lai-Sheung, Law Mo-Lan, To Sam-Ku	Comedy	
The Groom and His Double	Kwan Man-ching	Cheung Ying, Ng Lai-Sheung, Yee Chau-Sui, Lam Mui-mui, Tang Wai-Zhen, Sun Tsi-Hing, To Sam-Ku, Yip Yan-Foo, Law Sin-Yee, Lisa Mok Wan-Ha, Hui Yee-Wan, Lai Ming	Comedy	
Hundreds of Children and Thousands of Grandchildren	Ng Wui	Cheung Ying, Pak Suet-Sin, Yip Ping, Tang Mei-Mei, Fa Bik-Ha, Yeung Sau-Fung	Comedy	
Joy and Success	Chow Sze-Luk	Sit Kok-Sin, Pak Yin, Tang Mei-Mei	Comedy	
Local Scholar	Mok Hong-See	Liu Hap-Wai, Lo Ban-Chiu, Lee Lan, Wong Kei, Yuet-ching Lee, Gam Lau	Drama	
The Lusty Thief Girl	Kwan Man-ching	Lee Yi-Nin, Chan Sin-Yue, Ng Lai-Sheung, Tai Hau-Ho, Lam Siu-Mui, Cheng Lau-Kuen	Crime	
Mad Fire Mad Love	Esther Eng			
Return of the Swallows	Fung Chi-Kong, Fung Yat-Wai	Sit Kok-Sin, Siu Yin-Fei, Tsi Law-lin, Ma Siu-Ying, To Sam-Ku, Law Mo-Lan, Yeung Sau-Fung, Law Sin-Yee, Ma Siu-Ling, Gam Lau	Comedy	
The Thirteenth Girl's Adventure in Nengren Temple	Hung Chung-Ho	Chan Yim-Lung, Luk Fei-Hung, Lam Kar-Yee	Martial Arts	
Wealth Is Like a Dream	Yue Leung	Lo Ban-Chiu, Siu Yin-Fei, Lam Ka-Sing, Lam Kar-Yee	Drama	
Woman's Heart (Chinese: 天下婦人心)	Wu Pang	Cho Yee-Man, Yung Yuk-Yi, Cho Man-Ngai, To Sam-Ku, Yuet-ching Lee, Gam Lau	Drama	
1949
Adventure at the Women's House	Fung Chi-Kong	Sheung Hoi-Mui, Yu Lai-Zhen, Tong Sing-To, Chun Siu-Lei, To Sam-Ku, Ha Bo-Lin, Chan Lap-Ban	Chinese opera.	
The Ancient Beauty, Meng Lijun	Chan Pei	Chow Kwun-Ling, Sit Kok-Sin, Leung Siu-Kam, Ha Bo-Lin	Historical Drama	
The Crazy Duke (aka The Crazy Earl)	Yeung Kung-Leung	Ma Sze-Tsang, Tsi Law-Lin, Lee Pang-Fei, Tang Mei-Mei, Ko Lo-Chuen, Gam Lau	Musical comedy	
The Eight Yang Sister Seeks Golden Knife		Man Kok-Fei, Chan Yim-Lunh, Ying Lai-Ming, Lam Kar-Yee	Martial Arts, Cantonese opera	
Sima Fu's Encounter with the Honey Gang	Hung Suk-Wan	Ng Cho-Fan, Yung Siu-Yi, Yung Yuk-Yi	Thriller	
Strange Bedfellows	Yue Leung	Pak Wan, Pak Lei, Ma Siu-Ying, Lam Mui-mui, Lau Kwai-Hong, Tang Mei-Mei	Comedy	
Tan Kei in the Meat Hill	But Fu	Man Kok-Fei, Chun Siu-Lei, Lau Hak-Suen, Kam Yi, Piu Wai-Mui	Historical Drama Cantonese Opera	
To Kill the Love	Chu Kei	Pak Yin, Cheung Wood-Yau, Tsang Nam-Sze, Lee Ngan, Chan Chui-Bing, Ho Chung-Fong	Drama	
The True Story of Wong Fei Hung				Early Kung Fu film

== See also ==
- List of films set in Hong Kong

== Bibliography ==
- Fonoroff, Paul (1988). "A Brief History of Hong Kong Cinema" (PDF). Chinese University of Hong Kong.
- Ye, Tan; Zhu, Yun (2012). Historical Dictionary of Chinese Cinema. Rowman & Littlefield. ISBN 978-0-8108-6779-6.
