= List of Hong Kong films of 1956 =

A list of films produced in Hong Kong in 1956:

== 1956 ==
Title	Director	Cast	Genre	Notes
1956
The 3 Best Scholars	Ling Yun			
The 7 Heavens	Writer: Cho Yuan	Patrick Tse Yin		
An Actress In War		Cheung Ying		
Apartment For Women (aka Lui Ji Gung Yue)	Wong Wik	Cheung Chang, Shi Hui, Betty Loh Ti, Jue Lee	Comedy	
Autumn Affair	Yan Jun			
Beauty In The Maelstrom	Wang Yin			
Beauty In The Mist	Wong Hang	Pak Yin, Cheung Wood-Yau, Mui Yee, Lai Cheuk-Cheuk, Lee Yuet-Ching, Ma Siu-Ying, Lai Man, Hui Ying-Ying, Fung Yik-Mei	Drama	
Beauty Raised From The Dead	Lee Sun-fung			
Beyond The Blue Horizon	Li Han Hsiang			
Black Cat, The Cat Burglar	Wong Hang	Ng Cho-Fan, Tsang Nam-Sze, Lai Cheuk-Cheuk, Ha Wa, Hui Ying-Ying, Fung Wai-Man	Crime	
Blind Love	Evan Yang			
Bloodshed In The Chu Palace	Wong Hok Sing			
A Brave Girl Avenges Her Husband's Death	Chan Pei			
Brothers				
Chang E's Flight To The Moon	Wong Hok Sing			
The Chase	Yan Jun			
The Clumsy Hero	Wong Toi			
Colorful Tokyo	Chow See Luk			
A Corpse At Sea	Cho Kei			
A Country Bumpking Looks For His Son	Wong Hok Sing			
Country Girl Looks For Her Husband	Suen Wai			
A Dark Wench	Evan Yang			
Dial 999 For Murder				
Emperor Qianlong's Adventures In The Bower Of A Million Flowers	Ling Yun			
The Error	Doe Ching			
Fang Shiyu Comes To Hong Xiguan's Rescue				
The Fatherless Son				
Fatty Marries Skinny (aka Fatso Married Skinny)	Chiang Wai-Kwong	Sun-Ma Sze-Tsang, Cheng Pik-Ying, Tam Lan-Hing, Lam Kar-Yee, Lai Man, Helena Law Lan	Comedy	
Feather Fan Under Spring Lantern	Chow See Luk			
Fire	Cho Kei			
Fisherman's Delight				
The Flame of Love	Evan Yang			
The Foolish Heart	Chan Jing Boh, Law Gwan Hung, Zhu Shilin			
The Fresh Peony	Bai Guang, Law Chun			
Fruit Of Marriage	Doe Ching			
Funny Girl	Chiang Wai-Kwong	Fong Yim Fun, Wu Fung, Chu Dan, Tang Kei-Chan, Wong Cho-San, Ma Siu-Ying, Chan Chui-Bing, Leung Siu-Mui, Gam Lau, Lai Man, Lee Ngan	Comedy	
General "Soaring Tiger"	Lee Ying Yuen			
General Kwan Seduced By Diaochan Under Moonlight				
The Ghost Hero	Ling Yun			
Girl in Disguise	Chan Woon Man			
A Girl Named Hong Kong	Mok Hong See			
Gloomy Sunday	Evan Yang			
Golden Phoenix	Yan Jun			
The Grand Reunion	Chow See Luk			
Great Chums	Fung Fung			
Green Hills And Jade Valleys	Yueh Feng			
The Green Jade Hairpin	Chan Pei			
Happy Hall				
Heartbreak Weather	Choi Cheong			
Her Envious Beauty				
The Heroine Of Deadly Darts				
Homeward Flies The Swallow				
Hong Xiguan And Third Madam Of Yongchun				
How Fangtangjing Made A Fool Of the Unruly Girl	Cheung Wai Gwong			
How Huang Feihong Conquered The Two Tigers	Wu Pang			
How Huang Feihong Fought 5 Dragons Single-Handed	Wu Pang			
How Huang Feihong Pitted 7 Lions Against The Dragon	Wu Pang			
How Huang Feihong Pitted A Lion Against the Unicorn	Wu Pang			
How Huang Feihong Saved The Dragon's Mother's Temple	Wu Pang			
How Huang Feihong Saved The Lovelorn Monk From The Ancient Monastery	Wu Pang			
How Huang Feihong Set Fire To Dashatou	Wu Pang			
How Huang Feihong Thrice Captured Su Shulian In the Water	Wu Pang			
How Huang Feihong Thrice Tricked The Girl Bodyguard	Wu Pang			
How Huang Feihong Vanquished The 12 Tigers	Wu Pang			
How Huang Feihong Vanquished The Bully At The Red Opera Float	Wu Pang			
How Huang Feihong Vanquished The Terrible Hound At Shamian	Wu Pang			
How Liang Hongyu's War Drum Caused The Jin Army To Retreat	Wong Hok Sing			
How Mu Guiying Captured And Released Yang Zongbao 3 Times	Ling Yun			
How Xue Dingshan Thrice Angered Fan Lihua	Cheung Wai Gwong			
How Zhou Yu Was Thrice Defeated By Kong Ming	Wong Hok Sing			
Huang Feihong And The Courtesan's Boat Argument	Wu Pang			
Huang Feihong And The Lantern Festival Disturbance				
Huang Feihong At A Boxing Match				
Huang Feihong Attends The Joss-Stick Festival At Heavenly Goddess' Temple	Wu Pang			
Huang Feihong Goes To A Birthday Party At Guanshan	Wu Pang			
Huang Feihong Rescues The Fishmonger	Wu Pang			
Huang Feihong Wins the Dragon Boat Race	Wu Pang			
Huang Feihong's 7 Battles With The Fiery Unicorn	Wu Pang			
Huang Feihong's Battle At Mountain Goddess Of Mercy	Wu Pang, Ling Yun			
Huang Feihong's Battle At Shuangmendi	Wu Pang			
Huang Feihong's Fight In Foshan	Wu Pang			
Huang Feihong's Story : Iron Cock Against Centipede	Wu Pang			
Huang Feihong's Victory At Xiaobeijiang	Wu Pang			
A Hymn To Mother	Chu Kei			
I'm In Love With An Unfaithful Man	Chan Chung Gin			
The Ingenious Seduction	Bu Wancang, Lee Ying			
Iron-Palm Versus Eagle-Claw	Wu Pang			
The King And The Beauty	Lee Tit			
The Kunlun Girl Steals The Red Scarf By Night				
Lei Zhensheng's Many Adventures	Chan Gwok Wa			
Life And Death Together				
Life and Love of a Horse-Craft Driver	Tong Shiu Wa			
The Life Of Zuo Song	Yeung Kung Leung			
Little Sweetheart	Fung Fung			
A Lonely Heart	Doe Ching			
The Long Lane(长巷)	Bu Wancang			
Love And Hate (aka The Feud)	Lee Tit	Cheung Wood-Yau, Pak Suet-Sin, Lam Kau, Sek Kin, Chan Ho-Kau, Chan Lap-Ban, Lee Yuet-Ching	Martial Arts, Chinese Opera	
Love Is Like A Running Brook				
Lovers' Eternal Union				
Love's Elegy	Tu Guangqi			
Madam Du Sinks Her Treasure Chest in Anger (aka Tenth Madam to Sinks Her Treasure Chest in Anger)	Wong Tin-Lam	Sun-Ma Sze-Tsang, Yam Kim-Fai, Pak Suet-Sin, Lee Bo-Ying, Lam Mui-mui	Historical Drama	
Madam Mei	Wong Hang	Mui Yee, Cheung Wood-Yau, Yung Siu-Yi, Lam Mui-mui, To Sam-Ku, Lai Man, Hui Ying-Ying	Historical Drama	
Madam White Snake	Toyoda Shirou			
Madame Butterfly (aka Madam Butterfly)	Evan Yang	Li Li-Hua, Huang He, Chung Ching, Lo Wei, Lin Jing, Ma Lik, Chang Yi-Ming, Chen Yu-Hsin, Ma Hsiao-Nung, Lau Yan-Kit	Mandarin Romance Drama	
A Married Woman's Secret	Doe Ching			
Matching The Beauty And The Handsome	Ng Wui			
Meeting A Fairy While Slaying The Dragon	Fung Fung			
Merry-Go-Round	Yueh Feng			
Miss Kikuko	Yan Jun			
My Lover, The Ghost	Tu Guangqi			
Pleasure Daughter	Mok Hong-See	Fong Yim-Fen, Cheung Wood-Yau, Leung Sing-Bo, Lam Mui-Mui, Ma Siu-Ying	Comedy	
The Precious Lotus Lamp	Ng Wui	Tsi Law-lin, Mui Yee, Chan Ho-Kau, Pak Fung-Sin, Ma Shuk-Kau, Mak Chau-Nung, Wong Sau-Han, Pak Fung-Ying, Ng Yim-Hung, Chu Wai-Yi, Wong Yin-Ling, Fung Siu-Kwan, Yiu Suet-Ying, Yun Siu-Nung, Ho Bing-Bing, Ho Mui-Li	Fantasy Cantonese opera	
The Story of a Fur Coat	Tang Huang	Grace Chang, Peter Chen Ho, Chung Ching, Kao Pao-Shu, Tan Ni	Mandarin Comedy	
The Wall	Wong Hang	Lee Ching, Tsi Law-lin, Wong Man-lei, Fung Yik-Mei, Wong Oi-Ming, Tang Mei-Mei, Lai Man, Gam Lau	Comedy	
The Wise Guys Who Fool Around	Cheung Wai Kwong	Bruce Lee, Wu Fung, Leung Siu-Mui	Comedy	
