= List of Hong Kong films of 1953 =

A list of films produced in Hong Kong in 1953:

== List ==
Title	Director	Cast	Genre	Notes
1953
A Battle in An Old City'	Chang Mung-Wan	Lo Kai-Kwong, Chan Ho-Kau, Tsang Wan-Fei, Tin Kei-Fong		Hong Kong's first 3-D short film.
A Mother's Tears (aka Ci mu lei)	Chun Kim	Hung Sin-Nui, Cheung Ying, Ngai Man, Hui Ying-Ying, Lee Yuet-Ching, Tang Mei-Mei, Nam Hung, Yan Yan, Gam Lau	Drama	
A Song to Remember (aka Han chan qu)				
Aren't the Kids Lovely? (aka Er nu jing)				
Wu shan meng Lover Eternal				
Tie cuo men shen At Odds with Each Other				
Jia; Family				
Nie hai qing tian Heaven of Love, Sea of Sin				
Sheng yu si Life and Death				
Hua shen yan ying Beauty in Disguise				
Ge nu Gong Lingyan; An Songstress Called Hong Lingyan				
Li chao yan The Flight of the Swallow				
Nie hai hua A Torn Lily				
Xin xi xiang ji New West Chamber				
Xin Tang Bohu dian Qiuxiang; Scholar Tang Bohu and the Maid Qiuxiang				
Zhang fu ri ji Diary of a Husband				
Gui fang le Meal Time				
Huang jin shi jie World of Gold				
Qiu yu can hua Fallen Petals in the Autumn Rain				
Men; Marriage Affair				
Bai bao tu Map of 100 Treasures				
Tou ji feng mui Stealing Chickens to Offer Mother				
Ke chuan fu ren The Temporary Wife				
The Marriage of the Fool's Daughter	Lam Chuen	Pak Suet-Sin, Leung Sing-Bo, Law Kim-Long, Kwun-Ling Chow	Comedy	
Meal Time	Tu Kuang-Chi	Yan Jun, Chou Man-Hua, Lau Kei, Kau Ping, Wu Wei, Lee Wan	Comedy	
Notorious Woman (aka The Activities of Miss Soo Lee, The Secret Life of Lady So Lee, Ming nu ren bie zhuan)	Evan Yang, Tang Huang	Helen Li Mei, Hsieh Chih, Lo Wei, Tung Chan, Chang Yang, Kang Jiang, Ng Wai, Karen Yeung Ga-Ling	Drama	
Playboy Emperor		Law Yim-hing		
The Sisters' Tragic Love (aka Qing jie zi mei hua)				
Fu gui hua kai bing di lian Rich and Happy				
Ku hai ming deng The Guiding Light				
Shuang xiong dou zhi Two Heroic Rivals				
Pipa xiang Night and Every Night				
Xin hun ji The Newly-weds				
Mo gui tian tang Crooks' Heaven				
You xin bu pa chi Never Too Late				
Yi jia qin All in the Family				
Yu nu qing chou A Woman's Revenge				
Bai ri meng Day Dream				
Cui cui Singing Under the Moon				
Huo shu yin hua xiang ying hong Bright Night				
Huang Feihong yu jiu Haichuang si shang ji How Huang Fei-hong Redeemed Haitong Monastery Part 1				
Huang Feihong yu jiu Haichuang si xia ji How Huang Fei-hong Redeemed Haitong Monastery Part 2				
Cun cao xin Parents' Love				
Xiao feng xian General Chai and Lady Balsam				
Diao chan The Story of Diaochan				
Qi zi mei Seven Sisters				
Zhong qiu yue Festival Moon				
Ri chu Sunrise				
Jue dai jia ren The Peerless Beauty				
Qiu Jin; Qiu Jin, the Revolutionary Heroine				
Ming yue bing xin Her Pure Heart				
Tong zhe bu tong bing Not All Umbrellas Have Similar Handles				
Cai hong qu Rainbow Rhythms				
Can hua lei The Crushed Flower				
Yang zi dang zhi fu mu en Honour Thy Father and Mother				
Dang fu qing chi A Woman of Throbbing Passions				
The Humiliated Rickshaw-Puller	Lung To	Sun-Ma Sze-Tsang, Leung Sing-Bo, Fung Wong-Nui, Ha Wa, Tai Hau-Ho, Ng Kung-Yin	Cantonese opera	
In the Face of Demolition (aka Wei lou chun xiao)	Lee Tit	Ng Cho-Fan, Tsi Law-Lin, Bruce Lee Siu-Lung, Mui Yee, Lee Yuet-Ching, Helena Law Lan, Lai Cheuk-Cheuk, Wong Cho-San, Wong Man-Lei, Chow Nin-Wah, Yip Ping, Lam Mui-Mui, Mok Hung, Ho Siu-Hung, Ho Bik-Kin, Gam Lau, To Sam-Ku	Drama	
Keep Your Chin Up (aka Shui hong ling)				
Spring	Lee Sun-fung	Ng Cho-Fan, Yin Pak, Cheung Wood-Yau, Yuet-ching Lee	Historical Drama	
Sworn to Love	Chiang Wai-Kwong	Yam Kim-fai, Leung Sing-Bo, Mok Wan-Ha, Lai Man, Tam Sin-hung, Chan Lap-Ban	Comedy	
The Valiant Dog (aka The Heroic Dog)	Wong Toi	Lam Bik, Gam Lui, Kong Fan, Sheung-Kwun Kwan-Wai, Yu Mei-Wah, Ka Po, Cecelia Lee Fung-Sing	Drama	
Why Not Return? (aka The Reunion of a Bitter Couple)	Chan Pei	Sun-Ma Sze-Tsang, Chow Kwun-Ling, Wong Chiu-Miu, Fung Wong-Nui	Drama	
Wife and Husband (aka Fu fu zhi jian)				
