= List of Hong Kong films of 1962 =

A list of films produced in Hong Kong in 1962:

== 1962 ==
Title	Director	Cast	Genre	Notes
1962
A Loving Husband for My Lovely Daughter	Fok Yin	Butterfly Wu, Wu Fung, Leung Siu-Mui	Comedy	
Big and Little Wong Tin Bar		Jackie Chan		
3 Swordsmen from Emei	Lee Dut			
The 7 Tyrants of Jiangnan	Lung To			
999 The Mysterious Body				
Banners of Victory	Wong Hok Sing			
Battle at Sizhou	Wong Hok Sing			
Battle Between the Seven Phenixes and the Dragon	Wong Hok Sing			
The Beauty and the Swordsman	Leung Sam			
Beauty in a Fallen City	Wong Hok Sing			
Big and Little Wong Tin Bar				
The Birth of Na Zha	Wong Hok Sing			
The Birth of Shi Guizi	Wong Hok Sing			
Girl in Danger	Kwan Man-ching	Petrina Fung Bo-Bo. Lam Ka-Sing, Kwun-Ling Chow	Drama	
The Greatest Wedding on Earth	Wong Tin-Lam	Leung Sing-Bo, Liu En-Jia, Kitty Ting Hao, Christine Pai Lu-Ming	Comedy	
Love in the Pearl Chamber	Chan Pei	Mak Bing-Wing, Fung Wong-Nui	Drama	
The Magnificent Concubine	Li Han Hsiang			Entered into the 1962 Cannes Film Festival
The Quick-witted Woman Detective (aka A Detective's Affair)	Ling Yun	Tang Bik-wan, Wu Fung, Chu Dan, Yung Yuk-Yi, Chan Wai-Yue	Comedy	
Romance of the Phoenix Chamber (aka The Princess in Distress)	Wong Hok-Sing	Mak Bing-Wing, Fung Wong-Nui, Leung Sing-Bo, Wong Chin-Sui, Lau Yuet-Fung, Tam Lan-Hing, Chan Ho-Kau, Siu San-Kuen, Leung Kar-Bo	Historical Drama	
Secrets Between Husband and Wife (aka Happy Couples)	Mok Hong-see	Ying Ting, Wu Fung	Comedy	
To Capture the God of Wealth (aka Fake Saviour)	Chan Wan, Cheung Ying	Leung Sing-Bo, Cheung Ying, Teresa Ha Ping, Yeung Sai, Tam Lan-Hing, Chu Dan, Fung Wai-Man	Musical Comedy	
Matrimonial Storm (a.k.a. To Plunder a Wife)	Patrick Kong Yeung, Lui Ying	Yu So-Chau, Mak Bing-Wing, Leung Sing-Bo, Tam Lan-Hing, Suet Yim-Mui, Tai Sang-Po	Musical Comedy	
Story of the Sword	Wu Pang, Patrick Kong Yeung	Yu So-Chau, Walter Tso Tat-Wah, Josephine Siao Fong-Fong	Martial Arts	
Vampire Woman	Lee Tit	Yin Pak, Cheung Wood Yau, Man-lei Wong, Yuet-ching Lee	Historical Drama	
