= List of Hong Kong films of 1955 =

A list of films produced in Hong Kong in 1955:

== 1955 ==
Title	Director	Cast	Genre	Notes
1955
Amorous Adventures in the Jade Hall	Mok Hong See			
As Luck Will Have It	Wu Pang			
Backyard Adventures (aka Rear Window (remake))	Chan Pei, Chu Kei, Ng Wui	Cheung Ying, Chow Kwun-Ling, Yung Siu-Yi, Tsi Law-Lin, Lai Cheuk-Cheuk, Pak Suet-Sin, Fong Yim-Fen, Chan Lap-Ban, Lai Man, To Sam-Ku, Mok Wan-Ha, Wong Man-Lei, Hung Sin-Nui, Cheng Pik-Ying, Hui Ying-Ying, Yung Siu-Yi, Mui Yee, Kam Ping	Drama	
Bad-Luck for the Fishmonger at Tortoise Hill	Wong Hok Sing			
Bandits of Shandong Province	Wong Hok Sing			
Beautiful Spy, Kawashima Yoshiko	Leong Sum	Pak Ming, Law Kim-Long, Wong Ha-Fei, Lanna Wong Ha-Wai, Chan Wai-Yue, Lam Liu-Ngok, Leung Siu-Mui	Drama	
Between Father and Daughter	Lee Dut			
Blessings Come in Pairs	Yeung Kung Leung			
Blood Will Tell	Evan Yang	Li Li-Hua, Wang Yin, Chung Ching, Peter Chen Ho, Chen Yu-Hsin	Mandarin Historical Drama	
The Blood-Sained Swords of Shaolin	Chan Gwok Wa			
The Brave 8	Chan Gwok Wa			
Broken Spring Dreams	Lee Sun-fung			
Broken Zither Bower	Yeung Kung-Leung	Chow Chung, Pong Bik-Wan, Ding Ying, Lam Mui-Mui, To Sam-Ku, Hui Ying-Ying	Historical Drama	
Camille	Evan Yang			
Chen Shimei Betrays His Wife	Ling Yun			
Chen Shimei, the Unfaithful Husband and Qin Xianglian	Chan Chung Gin, Taam Ang Tong			
Chin Ping Mei	Wang Yin			
Cold Nights (aka :It Was a Cold Winter Night) (Chinese: 寒夜)	Lee Sun-fung	Ng Cho-Fan, Yin Pak, Lee Ching, Man-lei Wong, Lai Man, Yuet-ching Lee	Drama	
Crossroads	Mok Hong See			
The Devoted Lover	Ng Wui			
Diamond Thief	So Shing Sau, Woo Siu Fung			
A Dream of Love	Tong Tik Sang			
Eternal Peony	Chow See Luk			
Everlasting Love	Lee Tit			
Everyone Loves Grandpa	Wu Pang			
The Faithful Wife	Chiang Wai-Kwong	Fong Yim-Fun, Kong Yat-Fan, Tam Sin-hung, Bruce Lee, Lee Yuet-ching, Chan Lap-Ban	Drama	
The Five Tiger-Heroes	But Fu			
The Flower-Girl In Love				
Flying Spider	Wu Pang	Walter Tso Tat-Wah, Yung Siu-Yi, Tang Mei-Mei, Hui Ying-Ying, Lai Man, Lam Kar-Yee, Ching Lai	Action	
Forever Goodbye	Wang Yin			
Full House	Law Gwan Hung, Yam Yi Ji, Zhu Shilin			
The Ghost by the Melon-Store				
Heart Break Well	Doe Ching			
Heaven-Sent Millionaire				
Honeymoon	Cheung Wai Gwong			
How 4 Heroes from Guangdong Stormed the Pagoda of Pomegranate Flowers	But Fu			
How Four Heroes from Guangdong Avenged Their Father's Death	But Fu			
How Huang Feihong Vanquished the Bully on Long Dike	Wu Pang			
How Luo Bu Rescued His Mother	Chan Pei			
Huang Feihong's Rival for the Fireworks	Wu Pang			
Huang Feihong's Victory at Fourth Gate	Wu Pang			
The Hypocritical Heart	Chu Kei, Ng Wui			
If Only We'd Met When I Was Single				
In Different Lands We Still Long for Each Other	Ng Wui	Hung Sin-Nui, Ma Sze-Tsang, Cheung Wood-Yau, Wong Man-Lei, Fung Mei-Ying, Hui Ying-Ying, Kam Ping	Drama	
Intimate Love				
Iron-Monkey	Chan Gwok Wa			
Irreparable	Ching Biu Go			
It So Happens to a Woman	Li Pingqian			
Lady Balsam's Conquest	Cheung Sin Kwan, Wong Tin Lam, Evan Yang			
Lady Balsam's Conquest Part 2	Cheung Sin Kwan, Wong Tin Lam, Evan Yang			
Love (Part 1)	Chu Kei, Chun Kim			
Love (Part 2)	Chu Kei, Chun Kim			
Love and Duty	Tu Guangqi			
Love and Hate				
Love at First Sight	Zhu Shilin			
Love Trilogy	Cho Kei			
Loves of the Youngsters	So Shing Sau, Woo Siu Fung			
The Magic Monk and His Double	Wong Tin Lam			
The Matchmaker	Ng Wui			
Memories of a Drifting Life	Lee Sun-fung			
Miss Daisy				
The Model and the Car	Chan Pei	Yam Kim-fai, Bak Sheut-sin, Chan Kam-Tong, Ng Kwun-Lai, Ng Kung-Yin	Comedy Cantonese opera	
My Wife, My Wife	Cho Kei			
The Mystery of the Human Head	Kwan Man-ching			
Never Forgotten	Chan Pei	Cheung Ying, Chow Kwun-Ling, Yu Mei-Wah, Hui Ying-Ying	Drama	
Never Leave Me	Yuen Yeung On			
The Next Generation	Wu Pang			
The Nine-Finger Devil	Chan Gwok Wa			
Now That I've Got a Daughter, Everything's O.K.	Chiang Wai-Kwong	Yam Kim-fai, Christine Pai	Comedy	
On the Hill of the Waiting Wife She Awaits Her Husband's Return	Wu Pang			
The Opera Boat at Star Island	Goo Man Chung			
The Opera Boat in Singapore	Goo Man Chung			
Orphan's Song	Chin Daai Suk, Lee Gaai			
An Orphan's Tragedy	Chu Kei			
The Pagoda of Long Life	Ng Wui			
The Poisonous Rose				
Princess Yang Kwei Fei	Kenji Mizoguchi			
Punish the Unfaithful		Yim-hing Law		
Queen of the Stage (Chinese: 銀燈照玉人)	Lee Ying Yuen	Cheung Ying, Jeanette Lin Tsui, Ying Ting	Comedy	
The Renewal of an Ancient Garden				
Resurrection				
The Rich Girl and Her Double	Mok Hong See			
Romance in the West Chamber	Kwan Man-ching			
The Scholar Whose Ambition Is to Marry a Princess	Wong Tin Lam			
Seven Bodies, Eight Deaths And Nine Human Heads	Fung Fung			
Shilin Offers Sacrifice to the Leifeng Pagoda	Chow See Luk			
Silk Factory Girl	Chan Pei	Tang Pik-Wan, Chan Kam-Tong, Fung Wong-Nui, Yee Chau-Sui, Chow Hoi-Tong, Lam Mui-Mui, Cheng Kwun-Min, Ng Kung-Yin, Gam Lau, Ma Siu-Ying, Leung Suk-Hing, Chan Lap-Ban, Ching Lai, Tse Yuen-Lan, Tsang Wan-Sin	Historical Drama	
Silver Phoenix	Chow See Luk	Fong Yim-Fen, Cheung Ying, Cheng Wai-Sum, Lau Hak-Suen, Chan Lo-Wah, Wong Cho-San, Ma Siu-Ying		
Silvery Moon	Wu Pang			
Sing Her a Love Song	Leung King-Pok, Ling Yun, Yeung Kung-Leung	Sun-Ma Sze-Tsanh, Yam Kim-fai, Pak Suet-Sin, Kam Ling, Ma Siu-Ying, Cheung Sang, To Sam-Ku	Comedy	
A Sister's Heart	Wu Pang			
Spanking the Princess	Fung Fung			
The Story of Fang Shiyu and Hu Weiqian				
The Story of Gan Fengchi and Fourth Miss Lu	Wu Pang			
The Story of Huang Feihong	Wu Pang			
Story of Iron Monkey	Wu Pang			
Story of Iron Monkey 2				
The Story of Liang Kuan and Lin Shirong				
The Story of Lun Wenxu and Li Chunhua	Chan Pei			
The Story of Qiuhaitang				
The Strange Case of Three Wives	Poon Bing-Kuen	Patrick Tse, Patsy Kar	Crime	
Strange Tale at Midnight	Che Hung			
The Sun and the Moon Shine Again				
Teenage Romance	Chan Pei			
The Three Tests of Yu Tangchun	Wong Hok Sing			
This Wonderful Land				
Tokyo Interlude (aka Beauty of Tokyo)	Evan Yang	Li Li-Hua, Huang He, Chung Ching, Ma Lik, Bai Yu, Chang Yi-Ming, Lo Wei, Lin Jing, Ma Hsiao-Nung, Chang Chin-Ying, Kawaguchi Keiko	Mandarin Drama	
Tradition	Tong Wong			
Tragedy of Vendetta	Doe Ching			
Tragedy on the Hill of the Waiting Wife				
The True Story of Xiao Yuebai (Part 1)				
The True Story of Xiao Yuebai (Part 2)				
The True Story of Xiao Yuebai (Part 2)				
Two Sisters in a Buddhist House				
