= List of Hong Kong films of 1954 =

A list of films produced in Hong Kong in 1954:

== 1954 ==
Title	Director	Cast	Genre	Notes
1954
The 10 Year Search For The Missing Husband				
Autumn (aka Qiu)	Chun Kim	Ng Cho Fan, Hung Sin Nui, Cheung Wood-Yau, Yung Siu-Yi, Chan Lap-Ban, Sek Kin, Wong Cho-San, Chow Chi-Sing, Lee Yuet-ching, Lai Cheuk-Cheuk, Lam Mui-Mui, Fung Yik-Mei, Fung Mei-Ying, Yuen Siu-Hoi, Lee Ngan, Lee Sin-Pan, Ng Nga-Yee, Ng Tung, Heung Hoi, Lai Man, Lee Pang-Fei, Nam Hung, Sek Kin, Tong Kim-Ting, Yuen Siu-Fai, Lam Ka-Sing, Ling Mung, Lam King-Wan, Cheung Suet-Ying, Leung Kit-Chun, Nam Chai, Yan Yan	Historical drama	
Autumn Romance	Goo Man Chung			
Beautiful Crab Apple Flower	Chow Sze-Luk	Sun-Ma Sze-Tsang, Chow Kwun-Ling, Cheng Pik-Ying, Cheng Wai-Sum	Drama	Last film by Wanli Film Company.
The Beauty and the Dumb	Tong Wong			
Better You Better Half	Hoh Keung			
Beyond The Grave	Doe Ching			
Big Thunderstorm	Ng Wui			
Blood-Stained Flowers	Bu Wancang Lo Wei (and many others)			
The Boxer Of Nanhai	Leung Fung, Wu Pang			
Brother In Bloodshed	Wu Pang			
A Cuckoo's Spirit	Chun Kim			
The Dream Encounter Between Emperor Wu Of Han And Lady Wei	Lee Tit			
Eighteen Marriages of a Smart Girl	Tam Pak-Yip, Tang Kwang, Chan Chung-Kin	Leung Miu-Seung, Law Sai-Kim, Leung Suk-Hing, Nam Hung, Tam Sin-hung, Cheung Yuet-Yee, To Sam-Ku, Chan Lap-Ban	Drama	
Far Away	Chu Kei	Cheung Ying, Yin Pak, Mui Yee, Siu Yin-Fei		
Father And Son	Ng Wui			
A Girl In Transformation	Doe Ching			
Girl On The Loose	Wang Yin			
Grief Stricken For Me				
Happily Ever After				
Heartbreak Petals				
Her Difficult Life				
Her Fickle Heart	Ng Wui			
The Hills Divide Us	Ng Wui			
Homeward Bound	Wu Pang			
A Houseful Of Treasures				
Huang Feihong Tries His Shadowless Kick	Wu Pang			
It Blossoms Again	Bu Wancang, Ng Ging Ping			
It's Fun Getting Together		Lee Bo-Ying		
Lady From The Moon	Chiang Nan, Goo Sam Lam, Li Han Hsiang			
Lady Ping	Chu Kei, Ng Wui			
Lady Red Leaf				
Little Couple	Wang Yin			
Love in Malaya (aka Malaya Love Affair)	Tsi Law-lin	Tsi Law-lin	Drama	
Love Killed At Midnight	Ng Wui			
The Lover With A Heart Of Steel	Wu Pang			
Love's Sad Ending				
Loving Father, Faithful Son	Cho Kei			
Madam Yun (aka Madam Wan, Six Chapters of a Floating Life)	Ng Wui	Yin Pak, Cheung Wood-Yau, Yip Ping, Yuet-ching Lee, Lam Kwan-San, Ma Siu-Ying, Wong Hang, Tang Mei-Mei, Chow Chi-Sing, Lee Pang-Fei, Ng Wui, Lee Yuet-Ching, Chan Chui-Bing, Yan Yan, Law Hin-Tat, Ling Mung, Lee Ngan, Ng Tung, Gam Lau, Ko Lo-Chuen, Ng Ka-Lai, Helena Law Lan, Chor Yuen, To Sam-Ku	Historical Drama	
The Maidservant's Sad Tale				
The Mortal Wind	Tu Guangqi			
Mother	Ng Wui			
Motherly Love				
Neighbours All				
The Noble Family	Ng Wui			
Orchid Of The Valley	Kwan Man-ching			
Pavilion In The Spring Dawn	Yueh Feng			
The Pear Flower Washed by Rain	Fung Chi-Kong	Sheung-Kwun Kwan-Wai, Yu Mei-Wah, Mui Lan, Suk Tsi, Ka Po	Drama	
Poor But Happy	Wu Pang	Cheung Ying, Tsi Law-Lin, Lai Yee, Ma Siu-Ying, Gam Lau, Hui Ying-Ying	Drama	
Pretty Girl From Kuala Lumpur	Lee Tit			
Return	Lee Dut			
Returning The Pearl (aka The Mole)	Chiu Shu San	Helen Li Mei, Wong Ho, Wang Lai	Drama	
Romance Of Fuji Mountain	Mok Hong See			
Rose I Love You	Tu Guangqi			
Rouge Tears	Wu Pang			
Shadow In Her Heart	Doe Ching			
Spring Is In The Air				
Spring's Flight	Kwan Man-ching	Ng Cho-Fan, Hung Sin Nui, Wong Man-lei, Yung Siu-Yi, Ma Siu-Ying, Nam Hung, Cheng Man-Ha, Hui Yee-Wan, Yu Wai-Fun, Hui Ying-Ying	Drama	
Story Of Huang Feihong And Lin Shirong	Wu Pang			
The Story Of Yan Ruishing	Ling Yun			
Strayed Beauty	Chiu Shu San			
Success Follows Sorrow	Chan Pei, Che Hung			
The Supernatural Go-Between				
Sweet Seventeen	Chun Kim			
The Sword and the Gold Hairpin	Chan Kwok-Wah	Law Yim-Hing, Lam Kar-Yee, Lee Pang-Fei, Pak Lung-Chu	Martial Arts	
The Sword Our Match-Maker	Goo Man Chung			
Tales of the City	Li Pingqian			
Taps Off, Downstairs!				
Tears Of A Young Concubine	Lee Dut			
The Third Life	Doe Ching			
This Wonderful Life				
Three Cheers For Daddy	Wu Pang			
Tragedy Of Divorce				
The Tragedy Of The Double Marriage				
Two Sisters On Phoenix Bower	Ling Yun			
An Unforgettable Song	Wong Hang			
We'll Meet Again	Ng Wui			
What Price Beauty?	Cheung Sin Kwan, Evan Yang			
White Gold Dragon (aka White Gold Dragon (Remake))	Fung Chi-Kong	Sun-Ma Sze-Tsang, Tang Bik-wan, Lai Man-Soh, San Liu Hap-Wai, Lee Bo-Ying	Cantonese opera	Film debut for Hung Ying, a Production Company.
Whose Son Is This?	Fung Chi-Kong	Yam Kim-fai, Law Yim-Hing	Drama	
