= List of Hong Kong films of 1964 =

A list of films produced in Hong Kong in 1964:

== 1964 ==
Title	Director	Cast	Genre	Notes
1964
The 9 Phoenixes of the City (a.k.a. Nine Phoenixes of Hong Kong, a.k.a. The Nine Ladies of Fragrant City)	Chu Kei	Wu Fung, Yu So-Chau, Yu Lai-Zhen, Lee Heung-kam, Yam Bing-yee, Chu Yat-Hung, Kam Ying-Lin, Lai Kwan-Lin, Ying Lai-Lei, Leung Siu-Kam, Tam Sin-hung, Leung Sing-Bo, Mak Gei, Tam Lan-Hing, Yam Kim-fai, Poon Yat-On, Cecelia Lee Fung-Sing, Ng Kwun-Lai	Comedy	
Adventure of the Talents	Chang Hsin-yen (Cheung Sing-Yim), Lee Kai-Ming (Li Qiming)		Comedy	
A House of Happiness	Lo Yu-Kei	Law Kim-Long, Chan Ho-Kau, Leung Sing-Bo, Mui Lan, Leung Suk-Hing	Comedy	
An Affair to Remember	Lo Wei			
The Amorous Lotus Pan	Chow See Luk			
An Anxious Bride				
Assassination of the Prince (Part 1)	Chu Kei			
Assassination of the Prince (Part 2)	Chu Kei			
Autumn Love				
The Beau	Chun Kim	Patrick Tse, Patsy Kar, Wong Wai, Yu Mei-Wah, Yuet-ching Lee, Ma Siu-Ying, Yuk-Yi Yung	Comedy	
The Beauties	Wong Hok Sing			
A Beautiful Ghost				
Between Tears and Smiles	Yueh Feng			
The Dancing Millionairess	Doe Ching	Betty Loh Tih, Peter Chen Ho, King Hu Chin-Chuan, Lee Kwan, Lan Di, Chiang Kuang-Chao, Kao Pao-shu, Ou-Yang Sha-Fei, Lok Kei, Angela Yu Chien, Ha Yee-Chau, Chong Yuen-Yung, Ma Hsiao-Nung, Alison Chang Yen, Chin Ping, Margaret Hsing, Yueh Hua	Mandarin Musical	
The Dragon and the Bat	Yeung Hak	Josephine Siao Fong-Fong, Kwun-Ling Chow, Law Kim-Long, Lai Cheuk-Cheuk	Historical Drama	
Filial Sons and Grandchildren (a.k.a. Our Family)	Wu Pang	Law Yim-Hing, Wu Pang, Tam Lan-Hing, Lee Heung-kam, Lai Man, Lam Bou-Kuen, Leung Fung	Drama	
The Flying Fox	Choi Cheong, Siu Sang	Yu So-Chau, Lee Hung	Martial Arts	
Lady General Hua Mu-lan	Yueh Feng	Ivy Ling Po, Chin Han, Ching Miao	Huangmei opera	
The Last Woman of Shang	Choi In-hyeon, Yueh Feng	Shin Young-kyun, Cheng Pei-pei, Margaret Hsing, Li Ching	Drama	
A Mad Woman (Chinese: 瘋婦)	Chor Yuen	Yin Pak, Cheung Wood-Yau, Man-lei Wong, Lui Kei, Yuet-ching Lee	Historic Drama Horror	
Pigeon Cage (a.k.a. The Apartment of 14 Families)	Yeung Kung-Leung	Tang Bik-wan, Wu Fung, Teresa Ha, Kam Ping, Lai Man, To Sam-Ku, Yung Yuk-Yi	Comedy	
The Pitiless Sword (a.k.a. The Revenge Battle)	Wong Hok-Sing	Lam Ka-Sing, Yam Bing-yee	Historical Drama. Cantonese opera.	
Spy No. 13	Chan Kwok-Wah, Lam Fei-Aan	Walter Tso Tat-Wah, Yu So-Chau, Teresa Ha, Hung Hung, To Sam-Ku, Chan Siu-Chun, Lau Lin	Action	
The Story of Sue San	King Hu Chin-Chuan	Betty Loh Tih, Chao Lei, Ku Wen-Chung, Hung Mei	Mandarin opera	
