= List of Hong Kong films of 1960 =

The following is a list of films produced in Hong Kong in 1960:.

== 1960 ==
Title	Director	Cast	Genre	Notes
1960
A-Dou In The Army	Wong Hok Sing			
Adventure Of Black Heroine	Wong Hok Sing			
Affectionately Yours	Law Chi-Hung	Cheung Ying, Pak Yan, Wong Man-lei, Ma Siu-Ying, Chan Wai-Yue	Drama	
Alarm Conscious	Law Gwan Hung			
Ali Baba And The 40 Robbers	Luk Bong			
An Ancient Bride		Yam Kim-Fai, Law Yim-Hing, Yam Bing-Yee, Liang Tsi-Pak	Cantonese opera	
Apartment Murder	Wu Pang			
Ape's Daughter Vs. Dragon Devil (Part 1)	Wong Hok Sing			
Ape's Daughter Vs. Dragon Devil (Part 2)	Wong Hok Sing			
Autumn Leaves (aka Autumn Leaf)	Chor Yuen	Patrick Tse Yin, Wu Fung, Patsy Ka Ling, Kong Suet, Wong Cho-San, Lai Cheuk-Cheuk, Leung Chun-Mat, Man Leng, Tong Kim-Ting, Gam Lui, Yeung Yip-Wang, Leung Ming, Wong Hak, Cheng Man-Ha, Wong Hon, Lam Siu, Helena Law Lan, Chi Yun, Kam Chi, Lee Keng-Ching, Lam Po-Kin, Fung Mei-Ying, Cheung Sing-Fei, Tai Sang-Po		
Avenged	Chiang Wai-Kwong	Yam Kim-Fai, Man Lan, Leung Sing-Bo, Lam Ka-Sing, Fung Wong-Nui	Cantonese opera	
Bachelors Beware	Evan Yang	Linda Lin Dai, Chang Yang, Kelly Lai Chen, Yu So-Chau, Lin Hui, So Fung	Mandarin Romantic Comedy	
The Battle Between The Dragon And The Tiger	Wu Pang			
The Bedside Story	Bu Wancang			
The Book and the Sword (Chinese: 書劍恩仇錄)	Lee Sun-fung	Cheung Ying, Siu-Yi Yung, Tsi Law-Lin, Yuet-ching Lee	Wuxia	
The Colourful Phoenix Lamp (aka Lantern of Love)	Fung Chi-Kong	Sun-Ma Sze-Tsang, Tang Pik-Wan, Fung Wong-Nui, Chan Kam-Tong, Poon Yat-On, Fu Yung-Lai, Yim Tiu-Hung, Siu San-Kuen, Ma Siu-Ying, Cheung Sang, To Sam-Ku, Tang Wai-Fan, Cheung Sing-Fei, Wong Siu-Pak, Pak Lung-Chu, Ching Lai	Drama	
Daughter of a Gardener (aka Gardener's Daughter)	Chiang Wai-Kwong	Tang Pik-Wan, Wong Chin-Sui	Cantonese opera	
The Deadly Whip of Bones	Wong Fung	So Siu-Tong, Yu So-Chau, Yam Yin, Josephine Siao Fong-Fong, Connie Chan Po-Chu, Lee Heung-Kam	Martial Arts	
The Elevator Murder Case (aka Murder in Elevator)	Mok Hong-See		Crime	
The Enchanting Shadow	Li Han Hsiang			Entered into the 1960 Cannes Film Festival
Eve of the Wedding	Bu Wan-Cang	Lucilla Yu Ming, Chao Lei, Hung Bo, Kong Yan, Lai Man, Ma Hsiao-Nung	Mandarin Comedy	
Forever Yours	Evan Yang	Grace Chang, Kelly Lai Chen, Wang Lai	Mandarin Romance	
Fortune	Luk Bong	Law Kim-Long, Tang Pik-Wan, Ng Dan-Fung, Lee Ging-Fan, Ma Siu-Ying, Leung Sing-Bo, Cheng Kwun-Min, Pak Chau-Wan	Cantonese opera	
The Great Devotion (aka Love Cannot Read)	Chor Yuen	Yan Pak, Cheung Wood-Yau, Michael Lai Siu-Tin, Wong Oi-Ming, Petrina Fung Bo-Bo, Helena Law Lan, Chan Lap-Ban, Pak Yan, Yip Ping, Lee Yuet-Ching, Fung Wai-Man, Cheng Man-Ha	Drama	
Happily Ever After	Evan Yang	Lucilla Yu Ming, Roy Chiao Hung, Lee Ying, Hsieh Chia-Hua, Wang Lai, Kao Hsiang, Ma Hsiao-Nung, Lau Sin-Mung	Mandarin Comedy	
Honeymoon Panic (aka Frightful Honeymoon (HKFA))	Chan Man	Patrick Tse Yin, Nam Hung	Thriller	
Lady Racketeer	Chu Kei	Sun-Ma Sze-Tsang, Tang Pik-Wan, Chan Kam-Tong, Cheng Pik-Ying, Au-Yeung Kim, Lee Heung-kam, So Siu-Tong, Wong Hok-Sing, Poon Yat-On, Lee Pang-Fei, Siu Chung-Kwan, Liang Tsi-Pak, Au Ka-Seng, Cheung Sing-Fei	Cantonese opera	
The Last Five Minutes	Ng Wui	Ng Cho-Fan, Ling Ling, Lee Ching, Sek Kin, Seung-Goon Yuk, Lee Pang-Fei, Cheung Ho, Fung Ging-Man	Drama	
Last Minute	Chu Kei	Yam Kim-Fai, Ng Kwun-Lai, Poon Yat-On, Lam Ka-Sing, Luk Fei-Hung, Yam Bing-Yee, Lee Heung-Kam, Cheung Sang, Tang Wai-Fan	Cantonese opera	
The Marriage of the Beautiful Corpse	Wu Pang	Law Kim-Long, Law Yim-Hing, Leung Sing-Bo, Hui Ying-Sau	Historical Drama	
The Outcast Woman (Part 1) (aka A Deserted Woman)	Ng Wui	Ng Cho-Fan, Pak Yin	Drama	
The Orphan	Lee Sun-fung	Bruce Lee, Ng Cho Fan, Yin Pak, Fung Fung, Yuet-ching Lee	Drama	
The Orphan Saved Her Adoptive Mother	Fung Fung	Mak Bing-Wing, Wong-Nui Fung, Leung Sing-Bo, Petrina Fung Bo-Bo	Cantonese opera	
Prince Flying Dragon	Wong Hok-Sing, Liu Jian	Yam Kim-Fai, Yu Lai-Zhen, Leung Sing-Bo	Cantonese opera	
The Princess and Fok Wah	Chan Pei, Lee Sau-Kei	Sun-Ma Sze-Tsang, Law Yim-hing, Wong-Nui Fung, Kong Bo-Lin	Cantonese opera	
The Revenge of a Forlorn Wife	Chan Pei	Cheng Wai-Sum, Lee Bo-Ying, Lai Man-Soh, Chung Lai-Yung	Drama	
Second Spring	Wong Tin-Lam	Law Kim-Long, Christine Pai, Leung Sing-Bo, Ma Siu-Ying, Chan Ho-Kau, Lee Heung-kam, Lai Man	Drama	
Silly Wong Growing Rich	Chu Kei	Leung Sing-Bo, Tam Lan-Hing, Law Yim-Hing, Lee Heung-kam, Tam Sin-Hung, Helena Law Lan, Chow Wai-Fong	Comedy	
The Story of the Great Heroes (Part 1 and Part 2)	Lee Fa	Patrick Tse, Nam Hung, Lam Kau	Martial arts	
Story of a Sing Song Girl	Chiang Wai-Kwong	Law Kim-Long, Tang Pik-Wan, Leung Sing-Bo	Cantonese opera	
The Stubborn Generations	Lung To	Yam Kim-fai, Law Yim-hing, Leung Sing-Bo, Tam Lan-Hing, Ma Siu-Ying, Chan Lap-Ban	Musical Comedy	
Ten Schoolgirls (10 School)	Mok Hong-See	Ting Ying, Cheng Pik-Ying, Cheung Yee, Chan Ho-Kau, Lee Bo-Ying, Mui Lan, Yung Yuk-Yi	Comedy	
They All Say I Do	Ng Wui	Cheung Ying, Christine Pai, Fung Wong-Nui, Cheung Ching, Keung Chung-Ping, Tang Kei-Chan, Lisa Mok Wan-Ha	Comedy	
Three Females	Mok Hong-See	Lam Ka-Sing, Law Yim-Hing, Ting Ying, Carrie Ku Mei, Lau Hak-Suen, Lee Hak, Gam Lui, Fung Fung, Go Chiu, Chung Chan-Chi, Ying Lai-Lei, Suk Tsi, Yang Wen, Helena Law Lan, Wong Hak, Tai Sang-Po, Hon Seung	Comedy	
Wife-Teasing at the Honeymoon	Chu Kei	Yam Kim-Fai, Ng Kwun-Lai, Leung Sing-Bo, Yam Bing-Yee, Cheung Sang, Cheung Sing-Fei, Chan Lap-Ban	Cantonese Opera	
