= List of Hong Kong films of 1957 =

This is a partial list of films produced in Hong Kong in 1957:

== 1957 ==
Title	Director	Cast	Genre	Notes
The Autumn Phoenix	Wang Yin			
The Battle Of Love	Griffin Yueh Feng			
Beauty Parlour Girls	Law Gwan Hung, Yam Yi Ji, Zhu Shilin			
The Beauty's Grave	Fung Chi-Kong, Lo Yu-Kei	Yam Kim-fai, Ng Kwun-Lai, Law Kim-Long, Tam Lan-Hing	Cantonese opera	
Blood And Gold				
The Blood Of Patriotic Souls	Goo Man Chung			
Bloodshed In The Valley Of Love	Chu Yuan, Chun Kim			
Booze, Boobs and Bucks	Ma Xu Weibang			
Brothers In Disguise				
Building The Luoyang Bridge	Wong Hok Sing			
The Case Of The Blood Stain	Law Chi Hung			
Caught in the Act	Ng Wui			
The Chivalrous Songstress	Man Yat Man			
Eight Dames Tease the Scholar	Lee Sau-Kei	Tang Pik-Wan, Leung Miu-Seung, Lam Kar-Yee	Cantonese opera	
Escorting Lady Jing on a 1,000 Mile Journey (aka Escorting King-Neung on a Thousand Mile Journey)	Wong Tin-Lam, Ling Yun	Cheung Wood-Yau, Tsi Law-Lin, Mui Yee, Lau Hak-Suen, Cheung Sang, Ling Mung, Wan Ling-Kwong, Simon Yuen Siu-Tin, Wong Siu-Pak	Cantonese opera	
The Fairy in the Picture	Chiang Wai-Kwong	Yam Kim-fai, Pak Suet-Sin, Tam Lan-Hing, Lau Hak-Suen	Cantonese opera	
The Fox-Spirit's Romance (aka The Strange Fox)	Chan Pei	Cheung Wood-Yau, Mui Yee, Lam Kar-Yee, Chan Ho-Kau	Cantonese opera	
Half Way Down (aka Haleway Down, Halfway Down)	Tu Kuang-Chi	Lau Kei, Cheung Ying, Peter Chen Ho, Chan Wan	Mandarin Drama	
Holiday Express	Evan Yang	Chung Ching, Peter Chen Ho, Carrie Ku Mei	Mandarin Musical	
Mambo Girl	Evan Yang	Grace Chang	Drama/Romance	Mandarin.
Our Sister Hedy	Doe Ching	Mu Hong, Julie Yeh Feng, Jeanette Lin Tsui, So Fung	Comedy Drama	
Romance of Jade Hall (Part 1) (aka My Kingdom for a Husband)	Cho Kei	Cheung Ying, Law Yim-hing, Leung Sing-Bo, Tam Lan-Hing, Helena Law Lan, Leung Suk-Hing, Fung Wai-Man, Chan Chui-Bing, Cheng Man-Ha, Lai Man	Comedy Cantonese opera	It blends Cantonese opera singing with Western-style aristocratic comedy.
She Married an Overseas Chinese (aka China Wife)	Chan Man	Nam Hung, Keung Chung-Ping, Patrick Tse, Patsy Ka Ling, Lai Man, Lee Yuet-Ching, Lee Pang-Fei, Ng Tung, Wong Oi-Ming, Tong Kim-Ting, Yeung Ban, Chan Chui-Bing, Tang Cheung, Mok Hung, Lee Keng-Ching, Fung Mei-Ying, Lam Siu, Cheung Chi-Suen, Cheung Chok-Chow, Tai Sang-Po	Drama	
The Thunderstorm	Ng Wui	Bruce Lee, Cheung Ying, Yin Pak, Mui Yee, Ng Cho Fan	Drama/Romance	
The Whispering Palm (aka Ye lin yue, Moon Over Malaya) (Chinese: 椰林月)	Chun Kim, Chor Yuen	Patrick Tse, Patsy Kar, Keung Chung-ping, Nam Hung, Molly Wu Kar, Wong Cho-San, Lee Pang-Fei, Lai Man, Helena Law Lan, Wong Oi-Ming, Fung Mei-Ying	Drama	Note: One of the Nanyang Trilogy.
Wild Fire	Helen Li Mei, Chang Cheh	Helen Li Mei		
Wong Fei-Hung's Rebellion, Part 1	Fung Chi-Kong	Tang Pik-Wan, Kwan Tak-Hing, Leung Sing-Bo, Tam Sin-hung	Cantonese opera	
