= The Thunderstorm =

1957 Hong Kong film by Ng Wui

- Film poster of the 1970s re-release version
- Traditional Chinese: 雷雨
- Simplified Chinese: 雷雨
- Hanyu Pinyin: Léi Yǔ
- Jyutping: Leoi4 Jyu2
- Directed by: Ng Wui
- Screenplay by: Ching Kong
- Based on: Thunderstorm by Cao Yu
- Produced by: Au Ming-gau
- Starring: Bruce Lee; Yin Pak; Cheung Ying; Kong Duen-yee
- Cinematography: Suen Lun
- Edited by: Choi Cheong
- Music by: Wu Dajiang
- Production company: Wa Kiu Film Company
- Distributed by: Tai Sang Films
- Release date: 14 March 1957
- Running time: 124 minutes
- Country: Hong Kong
- Language: Cantonese

The Thunderstorm is a 1957 Hong Kong historical drama film starring Bruce Lee and directed by Ng Wui. The film is based on the play of the same name by Chinese dramatist Cao Yu. Originally filmed and released in Cantonese in 1957, The Thunderstorm was dubbed into Mandarin for re-release during the 1970s in Hong Kong when Bruce Lee shot to superstardom during the time when Mandarin films dominated Hong Kong cinema.

The film is also known as Thunder and Rain and Leiyu.

== Cast ==
- Bruce Lee as Chow Chung
- Yin Pak as Lui Shi-ping
- Cheung Ying as Chow Ping
- Mui Yee as Tse Fung
- Man-lei Wong as Fan Yee
- Ng Wui as Lu Kuei
- Lo Tan as father
- Lo Tun as Chow Pok-yuen
- Lee Ching as Lo Tai-hoi
- Law Lan
- Yip Ping
- Yuet-ching Lee
- Lee Pang-fei

== Production ==
In August 1956, The Thunderstorm was announced as one of the first two productions of Wa Kiu Film Company, alongside Fate in Tears and Laughter (1957). Ng Wui was set to direct, with Wu leading an ensemble cast that included Cheung Ying, Yin Pak, Mui Yee, Man-lei Wong, Lee Ching, Lo Tun, Yip Ping, and Yuet-ching Lee in lead roles. Pre-production lasted about a hundred days, during which the script underwent eight rewrites. The film was adapted from the play of the same name by Cao Yu. Significant changes in the adaptation of the included shifting the narrative from fragmented to chronological, extending the story's time frame from a single day in the original four-act play to a 20-year span in the film, and adding original plot elements, such as the aftermath of Chow Pok-yuen and Lui Shi-ping's private affair.

Filming began later that year, with production entering its final stages by December. The shoot lasted around a month and involved a crew of 126 people, considered large-scale for that time. Location shooting took place at Nam Sang Wai and the Tsui Sing Lau Pagoda in Yuen Long, as well as Castle Peak in Tuen Mun. Ng devised a new cinematography technique by tilting the tracks and rolling the camera down the slope for close-up shots, a method he named the "diving bomb" (Chinese: 俯衝轟炸). Test screenings were held on 10 March 1957, with Ta Kung Pao offering positive reviews and describing the ensemble cast's performance as "exceeding expectations".

== Release ==
The Thunderstorm was theatrically released in Hong Kong on 14 March 1957. It became the highest-grossing Hong Kong film of 1957 on its opening day, earning over HKD$30,000, and Ta Kung Pao noted that the box office was "very impressive" after a week. By the twelfth day of its release, over 400,000 viewers had been recorded, making it the highest-grossing Hong Kong film of all time. Rediffusion Television rebroadcast the radio series adapted from The Thunderstorm in response to the film's popularity. The film was also screened at the 28th Hong Kong International Film Festival, and had a digitally restored re-release in November 2023.

== Critical reception and legacy ==
Hon Lin of Wah Kiu Yat Po noted that while the film features strong performances, particularly by Cheung Ying and Ng Wui, it ultimately falls short in execution and coherence, leaving much to be desired in terms of storytelling and character development, rendering it less effective than the Cantonese opera of the same name released during the same period. Ho Chi-fung of Va Kio Daily considered the adaptation to be a "powerful and emotionally resonant" work, showcasing the maturity and talent of its original cast and crew, which contributes to its status as a classic. Film critic Yick Yi-man acknowledged that while he found Ng more adept at handling comedies and humor, he praised Ng's improvement in directing tragedies, highlighting his incorporation of humor and emotional depth into the film's familial scenes. The film was also said to "imitate the Blackboard Jungle-style films being made in the USA" at the time.

Although Bruce Lee only had a supporting role as Chow Chung, this film marks Lee's first adult role, with historian Ricardo Mak considering it as one of his most notable performances in a Cantonese-language film. This Bruce Lee film was also noted for the absence of fight scenes: "Counterpointing this combative role [in The Orphan], The Thunderstorm , featured no fight scenes at all," and was one of the first Hong Kong productions that starred a still-teenager Bruce Lee. Stephen Chow paid homage to The Thunderstorm by incorporating a scene where he portrayed Bruce Lee's part in his 1999 film King of Comedy. Some of the footage of the film is re-used in the international version of Tower of Death.

== See also ==
- Bruce Lee filmography
- Thunderstorm
