= Love and Duty =

Love and Duty may refer to:

- Love and Duty (play), a 1722 play by John Sturmy
- Love and Duty (1916 film), a silent film starring Oliver Hardy
- Love and Duty (1931 film), a Chinese silent film
- Love and Duty (1955 film), a Chinese film
- "Love and Duty", an episode of Xcalibur
- "Love and Duty", a song from the 1964 musical Robert and Elizabeth
