= In the Face of Demolition =

1953 Hong Kong film by Lee Tit

- DVD cover
- Traditional Chinese: 危樓春曉
- Simplified Chinese: 危楼春晓
- Hanyu Pinyin: Wēi Lóu Chūn Xiǎo
- Jyutping: Ngai4 Lau4 Cun1 Hiu2
- Directed by: Lee Tit
- Written by: Yu Kon-chi
- Produced by: Chan Man
- Starring: Bruce Lee; Cheung Ying; Ng Cho-fan; Tsi Law-lin
- Cinematography: Suen Lun
- Edited by: Leung Shing; Poon Chiu
- Music by: Yip Shun-chi
- Production company: Union Film Enterprise
- Release date: 27 November 1953 (Hong Kong)
- Running time: 130 minutes
- Country: Hong Kong
- Language: Cantonese

In the Face of Demolition (危樓春曉) is a 1953 Hong Kong drama film directed by Lee Tit and starring Bruce Lee, Cheung Ying, Ng Cho-fan and Tsi Law-lin. The film was ranked number 18 of the Best 100 Chinese Motion Pictures presented at the 24th Hong Kong Film Awards.

== Plot ==
This is a work depicting the lives of the lower classes in Hong Kong in the 1950s. The story revolves around the residents of a crumbling building made up of subdivided flats for renting at Fife Lane (快富巷).

Our protagonist is Lo Ming (羅明), a teacher who rented a room in one of the flats in the aboved-mentioned building and his interaction with the other tenants of the same building. The tenants came from all walks of life: a club girl Pak Ying (白瑩), a loyal taxi driver Leung Wai (梁威) and his wife, an unemployed and destitute Second Uncle Tam (譚二叔), his wife and his son Wah (華仔), a snobbish landlady Third Aunt (三姑) and her husband the Drunken Immortal (醉八仙), a domineering loan-shark Wong Tai-pan (黃大班) and his wife Mrs. Wong (黃師奶), and an ignorant girl from the countryside Yuk-fong (玉芳) who is the sister-in-law of Wong Tai-pan.

The story begins with Lo Ming's taking of tenancy of a room available for renting. His move-in, however, forces the incumbent tenant, a family of five who are so poor to pay the rent to move out. Fortunately, taxi driver Leung Wai and club girl Pak Ying chip in and help the family to rent the only vacant bed available for rental. Taxi Driver Leung and Pak Ying's kindness highlights the moral of the story: "One for all and all for one."

As the story develops, Lo Ming and Pak Ying fall in love and are getting ready to get married. However, at this juncture, the economy turns bad. The main characters of the story all suffer and are trying their best to cope with the situation and make a living.

Taxi Driver Leung is dismissed from his company while his wife is about to give birth to a baby. He works as a manual laborer to pay for the daily expenses. Uncle Tan is also suffering and has to rely on selling his own blood to make a living. Meanwhile, Yuk-fong is raped by Wong Tai-pan and she is devastated. Our protagonist Lo Ming is laid off by his school and Pak Ying can bring in barely enough to support the herself. With no alternative, Lo Ming is forced to work as a rent collector for the landlord of the building. He witnesses all the oppression and indifference of the rich towards the poor. Because his job involved collecting rent from other tenants, his relationship with them also deteriorates.

The story reaches the clamix in this dilapidated building on one stormy night: Leung Wai's pregnant wife is about to labour; Second Uncle Tam who works as a coolie right after selling his own blood dies from exhaustion; Yuk-fong devastated after the rape is about to hang herself; Lo Ming is agonised as he finds himselft caught between work and personal conscience; Tam's wife is struggling with funeral expenses; Leung Wai is struggling with hospital expenses for the childbirth - - everying one is in destitution and feeling there is no way out.

Finally, one day, the dilapidated building collapses due to a typhoon. The tenants, without a shelter, then realise that the only way out is to be united and work together to build their home.

== Cast ==
- Bruce Lee as Wah (華仔)
- Mui Yee - Fong
- Cheung Ying as Lo Ming (羅明)
- Ng Cho-fan as Leung Wai (梁威)
- Tsi Law-lin as Pak Ying (白瑩)
- Lo Duen as Wong Tai-pan (黃大班)
- Kong Duen-yee as Yuk-fong (玉芳)
- Gao Luquan as Drunken Immortal (醉八仙)
- Lee Yuet-ching as Third Aunt (三姑)
- Law Lan as Nurse
- Fung Ying-seung as Suave gangster
- Chow Chi-sing as Rent collector
- Lai Cheuk-Cheuk as Mrs. Wong (黃師奶)
- Wong Cho-san as Second Uncle Tam (譚二叔)
- Wong Man-lei as Tam's wife
- Chow Nin-wa as Servant
- Yip Ping as Wai's wife
- Lam Mui-mui as Ling-chi (玲子)
- Mok Hung as Head of dance hostesses
- Ho Siu-hung as Fourth Uncle (四叔)
- Ho Pik-kin as So Chi-sing (蘇子誠)
- Kam Lo as Nurse
- To Sam-Ku as Seventh Aunt (七姑)

== See also ==
- Bruce Lee filmography
