= Mui-mui Lam =

Hong Kong actress

- Chinese: 林妹妹
- Born: 17 January 1912; Kowloon, Hong Kong
- Died: 5 January 1968 (aged 55); Hong Kong
- Other name: Lam Mui Mui
- Occupation: Actress
- Years active: 1933–1962

Mui-mui Lam (Chinese: 林妹妹) (January 17, 1912 – January 5, 1968) is a former Chinese actress from Hong Kong. Lam is credited with over 250 films.

== Early life ==
Lam was born on 17 January 1912.

== Career ==
In 1933, Lam began acting in Hong Kong films. Lam first appeared in Conscience, a 1933 drama directed by Chow Wing-Loi and Mak Siu-Ha. Lam appeared as a wealthy lady in The White Gold Dragon, Part Two, a 1937 Cantonese opera film. Lam is known for her role as a shrew concubine or a wicked woman. Lam appeared as elder daughter-in-law in Mother and Son in Grief (1951), as a concubine in The Story of Liang Kuan and Lin Shirong (aka Leung Foon and Lam Sai-Wing) (1955), and Pleasure Daughter (1956). Lam also appeared in Cantonese drama, comedy, and romance films. Lam's last film was The Reunion, a 1962 historical drama film directed by Ng Wui. Lam is credited with over 250 films.

== Filmography ==
=== Films ===
This is a partial list of films.

- 1933 Conscience
- 1937 The White Gold Dragon, Part Two - wealthy lady
- 1939 Chuang Tzu Tests His Wife (aka Chuang Tzu's Butterfly Dream)
- 1951 Mother and Son in Grief - Elder daughter-in-law
- 1953 In the Face of Demolition
- 1953 Family (aka The Family - The Torrents Trilogy 《激流三部曲》 by Ba Jin)
- 1953 Spring (second novel of the Trilogy)
- 1954 Autumn (third novel of the Trilogy)
- 1955 The Story of Liang Kuan and Lin Shirong (aka Leung Foon and Lam Sai-Wing) - concubine
- 1956 Pleasure Daughter
- 1956 Madam Mei
- 1962 The Reunion

== Personal life ==
Lam died on 5 January 1968 in Hong Kong.
