= List of Hong Kong films of 1951 =

A list of films produced in Hong Kong in 1951:

== 1951 ==
Title	Director	Cast	Genre	Notes
1951
The Naked City				
Saboteur				
The Scatterbrain (aka Shihunyu)	Chow Sze-Luk	Tang Kei-Chan, Hung Cheuk, Tsang Nam-Sze, Au-Yeung Kim, Chun Siu-Lei, Fung Ying-Seung, Lau Kwai-Hong, To Sam-Ku, Liu Mung-Kok, Leung Suk-Hing, Lam Kar-Yee, Wong Aau, Chao Fei-Fei, Chan Lap-Ban, Sai Gwa-Pau, Lam Mui-Mui	Comedy	
Second Lady	Fung Fung-Kor	Ng Cho-Fan, Tsi Law-Lin, Fung Ying-Seung, Yung Yuk-Yi, Ha Bo-Lin, Gam Lau, Carrie Ku Mei	Drama	
Sweet Girls	Wong Hok-Sing	Sheung Hoi-Mui, Tam Lan-Hing, Yu Lai-Zhen, Chun Siu-Lei, To Sam-Ku, Fa Bik-Ha, Chan Lap-Ban	Drama	
Lei dian zhui feng jian The Lightning Sword				
Chang duan mu zi xin Mother and Son in Grief				
Emei fei jian heng sao jin yin gong How the Flying Swordsman from Emei Mountain Raided Gold and Silver Palace				
Nu ren yu lao hu The Affair of Diana				
Yao chi yuan yang Celestial Lovers				
Qi can hong Weep for the Fallen Petals				
Hua gu niang The Flower Girl				
Emei fei xia wu chuang feng huo dao Flying Swordsman's Adventure on Island of Wind and Fire				
Huang jiang nu xia da po wu gong zhen How the Heroine of Deserted River Shattered the Centipedes Militia				
Gu chu lei An Orphan's Sad Tale				
Mo gong yao hou Queen of the Devil's Palace				

Title	Director	Cast	Genre	Notes
Lian wo liang qing Mutual Affections				
Xue ying han mei Plum-Blossom in the Snow				
Wu long hun yin Marriage by Mistake				
Leng luo chun xiao Neglected Wife				
Ren zhi cu Infancy				Literally: The Birth of Mankind
Yin deng mo ying Phantom in the Limelight				
Ge yuan xiang hun The Singing Girl's Spirit				
Piao ling yan Drifting in the Sea				
Chun dao ren jian Advent of Spring				
Qing tian gu yan Orphan Girl in Love				
Ren yue huang hun hou Sunset Rendezvous				
Wu xian en qing wu xian hen Fathomless Love, Fathomless Hate				
Yi fan feng shun Sail on to Success				
Wu jia qi Spoiling the Wedding Day				
Aau seung han A Sad Tale of Rainbow Robes				
Fei dao li feng jiao Li Fengjion's Flying Daggers				
Jin hun ji A Night-Time Wife				
Cong ci xiao lang mo lu ren From Now on We Are Strangers				
Wu di lian huan biao Darts of Fury				
Diyuan chunxin hua dujuan A King Speaks His Heart				
Ci xiong shuang xia The Chivalrous Pair				
Wu zi mei Five Sisters				
Kunlun san jian xia Three Swordsmen from Kunlun				
Fu zhi xin ling Lucky Strike				
Guai cuo you qing lang The Wrongly-Accused Lover				
Nan wei le mama Poor Mother				
Xin hu bu gui Why Not Return?				
Ling Guixing san da Liang Tianlai; How Liang Tianlai Was Thrice Beaten Up by Ling Guiqing				
Yuan fu qing ge An Unhappy Woman's Love Song				
Qiu fen Autumn Tombs				
Jia cu jin gui xu She Regrets Having Married a Rich Husband				
Hong lou xin meng A Dream of Red Mansions				
Huo shao lian huan chuan				
