= Roar of the People =

1941 Hong Kong film by Tang Xiaodan

- 民族的吼聲
- Directed by: Tang Xiaodan
- Written by: Lee Fung
- Produced by: Chiu Shu-San
- Production company: Grandview Company
- Release date: 4 July 1941 (Hong Kong)
- Running time: 117 minutes
- Country: Hong Kong
- Language: Cantonese

Roar of the People is a 1941 Hong Kong wartime drama film directed by Tang Xiaodan.

The film is set in Hong Kong during the Second Sino-Japanese War, when people fled to Hong Kong from Mainland China. It was released five months before the start of the Japanese occupation of Hong Kong.

== Plot ==
A Hong Kong refugee gives shelter to a woman who was victimized by tycoon dealing contraband to the opposing forces of the country.

== Cast ==
- Cheung Ying - workers' leader
- Fung Fung
- Wong An
- Chan Tin-Tsung
- Fung Ying-Seong
- Ng Wui
- Lee Tan-Lo
- Leong Mo-Sik
- Cho Tat-wah
- Walter Tso
- Gao Luquan (credited as Ko Lo-Chuen)
