= Golden Gate Girl =

1941 Hong Kong film by Esther Eng and Kwan Man-ching

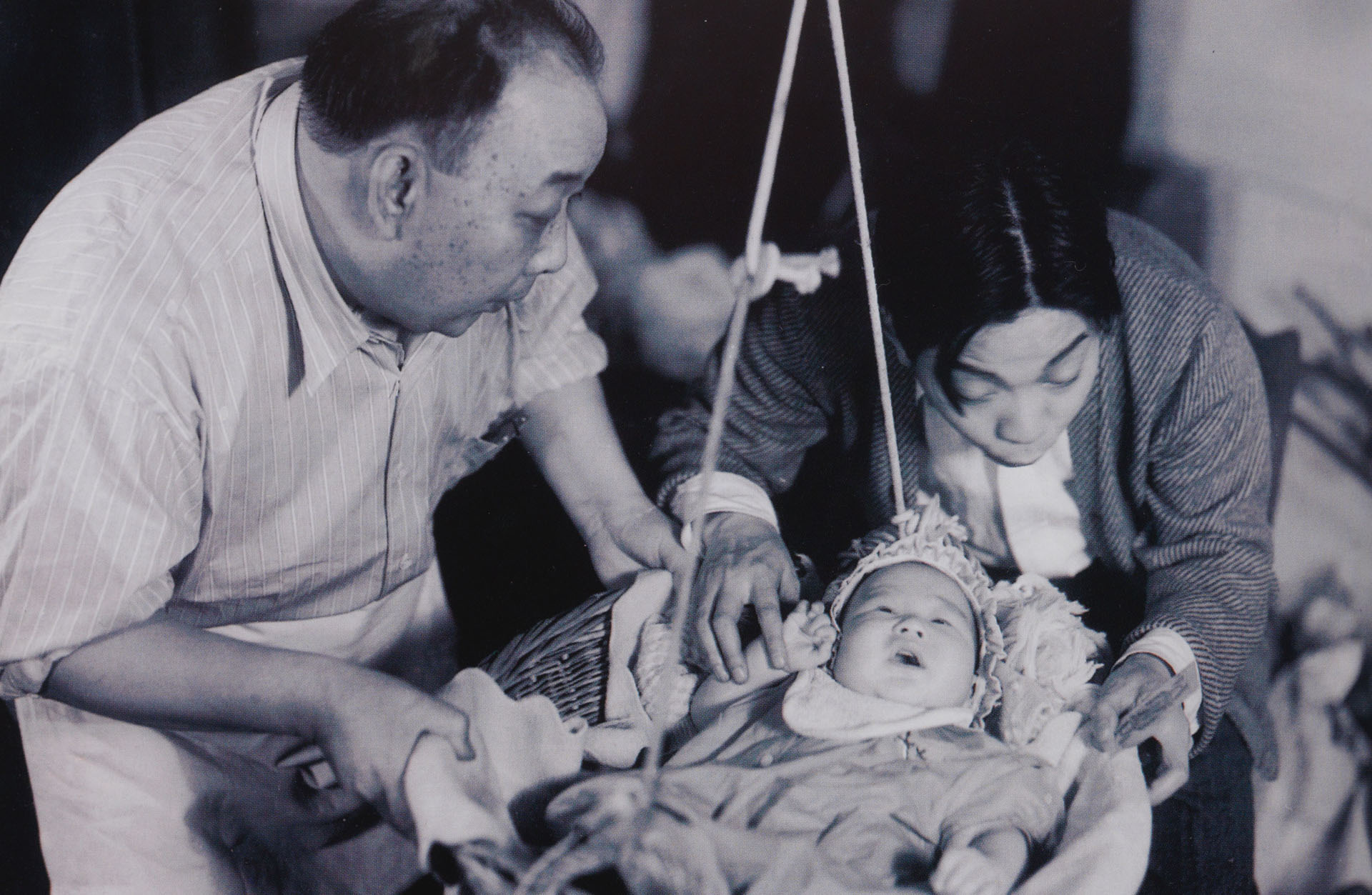
- A scene featuring Bruce Lee (baby)
- Traditional Chinese: 金門女
- Simplified Chinese: 金门女
- Hanyu Pinyin: Jīn Mén Nǔ
- Jyutping: Gam1 Mun4 Neoi2
- Directed by: Esther Eng, Kwan Man-Ching
- Written by: Kwan Man-Ching
- Produced by: Charlie Low
- Starring: Wong Hok Sing, Bruce Lee, Tso Yee Man
- Cinematography: J. Sunn
- Edited by: Kwan Man-Ching
- Production company: Grandview Film Company
- Release date: 27 May 1941
- Running time: 110 minutes
- Country: Hong Kong
- Language: Cantonese

Golden Gate Girl, also known as Tears in San Francisco or Jinmen Nü, is a Hong Kong drama film made in San Francisco in 1941, directed by Esther Eng and veteran filmmaker Kwan Man-Ching, the film was released in San Francisco but wasn't shown in Asia until 1946. The film is notable for the film debut of Bruce Lee, an infant at the time.

It tells of a widower (Moon Kwan) who is concerned that his daughter, Chain-ying (Tso Yee-man), spends too much time at the theater. When she falls in love with Wong, one of the company's leading actors, the enraged widower forces the theater to close its contract with Wong, resulting in the actor's deportation to China. But Chain-ying is already pregnant and dies after giving birth to a baby girl (played by Bruce Lee, then aged three months). The widower's former employees look after the baby, who, like her mother, grows up (Tso Yee-man again) with a passion for the theater. After a series of complications, tears, and comic moments, she is eventually reunited with her father, Wong, when he visits the United States to perform in a national defense play (to aid China then at war), and they are finally reconciled with her aging, remorseful maternal grandfather.

The making of Golden Gate Girl is the subject of a 2014 feature documentary titled Golden Gate Girls, directed by S. Louisa Wei, who constructed the story around the life and times of woman film pioneer Esther Eng.

== Cast ==
- Nom Liu
- Kwan Man-Ching
- Fee Luk Won
- Wong Hok Sing
- Man Tso Yee
- Bruce Lee

== See also ==
- Bruce Lee filmography
