= The Book and the Sword (1960 film) =

1960 Hong Kong film by Lee Sun-fung

- 書劍恩仇錄
- Directed by: Lee Sun-fung
- Screenplay by: Lee Sun-fung
- Based on: The Book and the Sword by Jin Yong
- Starring: Cheung Ying; Chan Kam-tong; Leung So-kam; Shih Kien; Ma Kam-ling; Yeung Yip-wang
- Production company: Emei Film Company
- Release dates: 4 May 1960 (Part 1); 9 June 1960 (Part 2)
- Language: Cantonese

The Book and the Sword (書劍恩仇錄) is a 1960 Hong Kong wuxia film adapted from the novel of the same title by Jin Yong. Directed and written by Lee Sun-fung, the film was divided into two parts, respectively released on 4 May and 9 June 1960 in Hong Kong.

== Cast ==
- Cheung Ying as Chen Jialuo / the Qianlong Emperor
- Chan Kam-tong as Wen Tailai
- Leung So-kam as Luo Bing
- Shih Kien as Zhang Zhaozhong
- Ma Kam-ling as Li Yuanzhi
- Yeung Yip-wang as Lu Feiqing
- Shek Yin-tsi as Yu Yutong
- Wong Chor-san as Zhou Zhongying
- Lee Yuet-ching as Zhou Zhongying's wife
- Sheung-koon Kwan-wai as Zhou Qi
- Lam Kau as Xu Tianhong
- Tsi Law-lin as Huoqingtong
- Yung Siu-yi as Princess Fragrance
- Chan Tsui-ping as Yuruyi
- Siu Hon-sang as Bai Zhen
- Ho Siu-hung as Muzhuolun
