= Yi-Nin Lee =

Chinese actress from Hong Kong

- Chinese: 李綺年
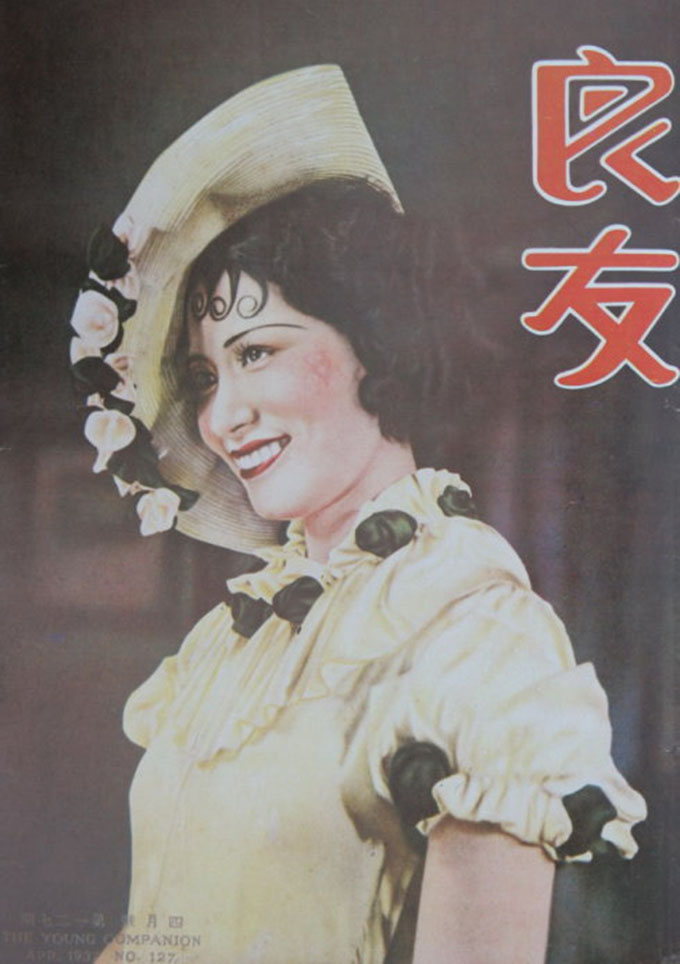
- Lee in 1937
- Born: 1914
- Died: 4 November 1950
- Other names: Lee Cho-Hing, Lee Yi-Nin, Lee Yin-Nin, Li Qinian, Li Yi-Nian
- Occupation: Actress
- Years active: 1935–1949

Yi-Nin Lee (Chinese: 李綺年) (1914 – 4 November 1950) was a Chinese actress from Hong Kong. Lee is credited with over 40 films.

== Early life ==
In 1914, Lee was born.

== Career ==
In 1935, Lee joined Grandview Film Company and became an actress in Hong Kong films. Lee first appeared as Wan Ying in Yesterday's Song (aka Voice of the Broken-hearted), a 1935 Drama film directed by Chiu Shu-San. Lee was known for her appearance as a lead actress in Cantonese Drama, Comedy, Crime, Romance, and War films in 1930s to 1940s. In War films, Lee appeared as Luk Mo-Jing in The Light of Women, a 1937 War film directed by Go Lee-Han, and appeared as Ma Pik-Chu in Incident in the Pacific, a 1938 War film directed by Hou Yao. Lee's last film was A Moral Hooker, a 1949 Drama film. Lee is credited with over 40 films.

== Filmography ==
=== Films ===
This is a partial list of films.

- 1935 Yesterday's Song (aka Voice of the Broken-hearted) - Wan Ying
- 1937 The Light of Women - Luk Mo-Jing
- 1938 Incident in the Pacific - Ma Pik-Chu
- 1948 The Lusty Thief Girl - Mary
- 1949 A Moral Hooker

== Personal life ==
Lee died on 4 November 1950.
