= Kwan Man-ching =

Chinese film director (1896–1995)

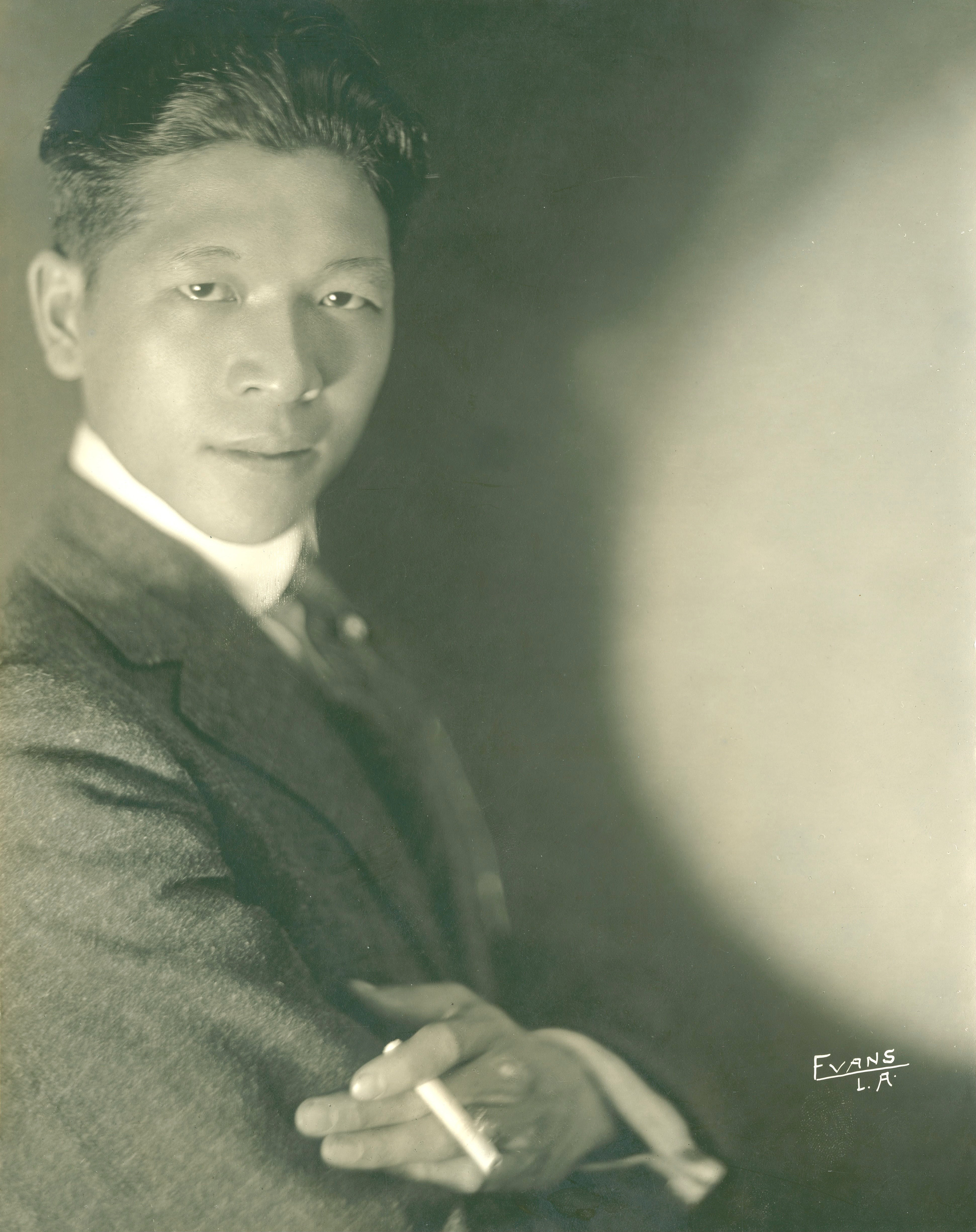
- Kwan c. 1917–1920; taken by Nelson Evans
- Born: 30 September 1896; Kaiping County, Guangdong, China
- Died: 17 June 1995 (aged 98); San Francisco, California
- Other names: Moon Kwan
- Occupation: Film director
- Years active: 1926–1969

Chinese name
- Traditional Chinese: 關文清
- Simplified Chinese: 关文清
Transcriptions
Standard Mandarin
- Hanyu Pinyin: Guān Wénqīng
- Wade–Giles: Kuan^{1} Wen^{2}ch`ing^{1}
Yue: Cantonese
- Yale Romanization: Gwaan^{1} Man^{4}ching^{1}
- Jyutping: Gwaan^{1} Man^{4}cing^{1}
- Hong Kong Romanisation: Kwan Man-ching

Kwan Man-ching (Note: Simplified Chinese: 关文清; traditional Chinese: 關文清; Jyutping: Gwaan1 Man4cing1; pinyin: Guān Wénqīng) (30 September 1896 – 17 June 1995), better known in the United States as Moon Kwan, was a Chinese film director. Born in Kaiping County, Guangdong, Kwan travelled to San Francisco after studying English in Hong Kong. Unable to finish his studies, he moved to Hollywood in the mid-1910s. Through the newspaper editor Harry Carr, he was introduced to the director D. W. Griffith and hired as a technical consultant for Broken Blossoms (1919). Through 1920, Kwan provided consulting on Chinese subjects for Hollywood filmmakers, simultaneously publishing original and translated poetry.

Kwan returned to China in 1921, moving to Hong Kong after finding little success in Shanghai. Working first for Minxin and later for the United Photoplay Service, he held a variety of roles and frequently travelled to the United States. During one 1933 trip, he met Joseph Sunn, with whom he established the Grandview Film Company and made Blossom Time (1933) – one of the first Cantonese-language talkies. As the Second Sino-Japanese War was escalating, Kwan directed several films with nationalist themes, beginning with Life Lines in 1935. Spending the Japanese occupation of Hong Kong as a teacher, he returned to filmmaking in 1947, making his final film in 1969. Kwan, having directed more than fifty films in his lifetime, has been described by the film critic Paul Fonoroff as one of early Hong Kong cinema's most influential directors.

== Biography ==
=== Early life ===
Kwan was born in Dawu Village, part of Kaiping County, Guangdong, on 30 September 1896. (Note: Kwan's family identifies his year of birth as 1894 (Chung 2022, p. 32). In correspondence with Harriet Monroe (Lester 2023, p. 85), as well as in his newspaper publications (Chung 2022, p. 37), Kwan indicated that he was born in 1896.) The son of a teacher, Kwan enrolled at a private school at the age of seven. He was subsequently sent to Hong Kong c. 1910 to study English. In 1911, he was selected by Ida K. Greenlee as one of seventy-five youths chosen to study in the United States.

Travelling by ship, he arrived in San Francisco and took residence with an older brother and continued his schooling. Kwan's studies, however, were abbreviated with his brother's death in 1914. Unable to fund his education, he decided to join the film industry. He later cited several reasons, including a desire to improve the cinema of China, an intent to extend film to education, and his desire to meet his celebrity crush Mary Pickford. Kwan thus left for Hollywood, Los Angeles.

=== Early Hollywood career ===
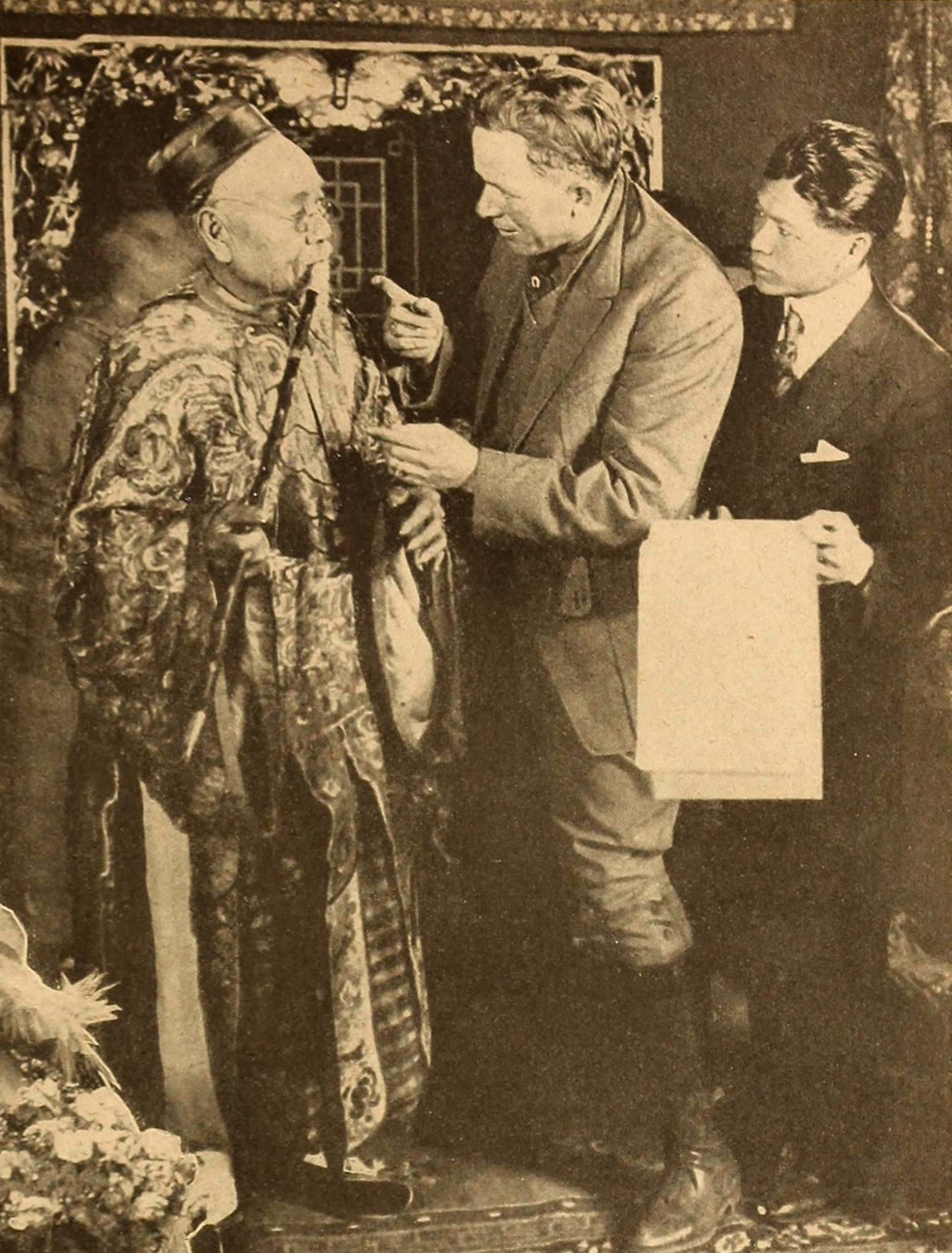
Kwan (right) and George Melford with an unidentified actor, 1920

Kwan found boarding at the Guang Ju Lung grocery store, owned by another Kaiping native, and received support from the Chinese diaspora community. He was working as a dishwasher when, while walking in Chinatown, he met the artist Howard Willard. They became fast friends, and Kwan moved into Willard's loft at Baker Block. Through another artist living there, Kwan found work as an extra on the set of a film directed by Cecil B. DeMille.

Over time, Kwan learned about filmmaking through practical experience and book learning. This included an assistant director position on the short film The Foolish Detective, for which he also helped with development and processing. For this film, Kwan had agreed to a first-dollar gross contract, and thus he received no payment when the film was never distributed. Through the late 1910s, he lived a bohemian lifestyle, frequently associating with musicians, artists, and actors, and sitting for a series of portraits with Margrethe Mather in 1918.

As Kwan continued his studies, he wrote extensively. He had several poems published in newspapers, and through a friend at Baker Block he met the newspaper editor Harry Carr. Interested in presenting Chinese culture to his readers, Carr asked Kwan to produce articles retelling his childhood experiences. Over the next several years, Kwan published two novels and a series of articles with Carr's office. He also produced a poetry collection, A Pagoda of Jewels, in 1920.

It is also through Carr that Kwan met the director D. W. Griffith, who was in the process of making Broken Blossoms (1919) – a film based on a Thomas Burke story that depicts a Chinese man living in London. Kwan agreed to become a technical consultant, helping Richard Barthelmess depict the Chinese lead Cheng Huan while also providing feedback on the props and sets. He coordinated with Cantonese-speaking extras, and urged that Griffith forgo giving characters anachronistic queues. Following the film's release, Kwan provided technical assistance with several other films, including George Melford's The City of Dim Faces (1918), on which he also served as translator and assistant director.

=== Transnational cinema ===
Frustrated with the anti-Chinese discrimination in the United States and feeling that he had learned all he could in Hollywood, Kwan returned to China in 1921. Landing in Shanghai, he attempted to enter the film industry but found little success; one attempt to establish a film production company with Wang Changtai failed after the climate proved too hot for darkroom work, while another with the Zhongguo Film Company failed when that company collapsed. Kwan thus worked as a cashier for a book company, spending six months in that position.

Kwan left for Hong Kong, where he joined Minxin. In 1925, he worked as a make-up artist on Rouge – the first full-length feature film to be produced in Hong Kong. As the Canton–Hong Kong strike resulted in the downturn of the colony's film industry, Kwan returned to Guangdong and established the Nanyue Film Company in Guangzhou. The company produced one film, Newfound Wealth from a Newborn, in 1926; this was Kwan's debut as a director.

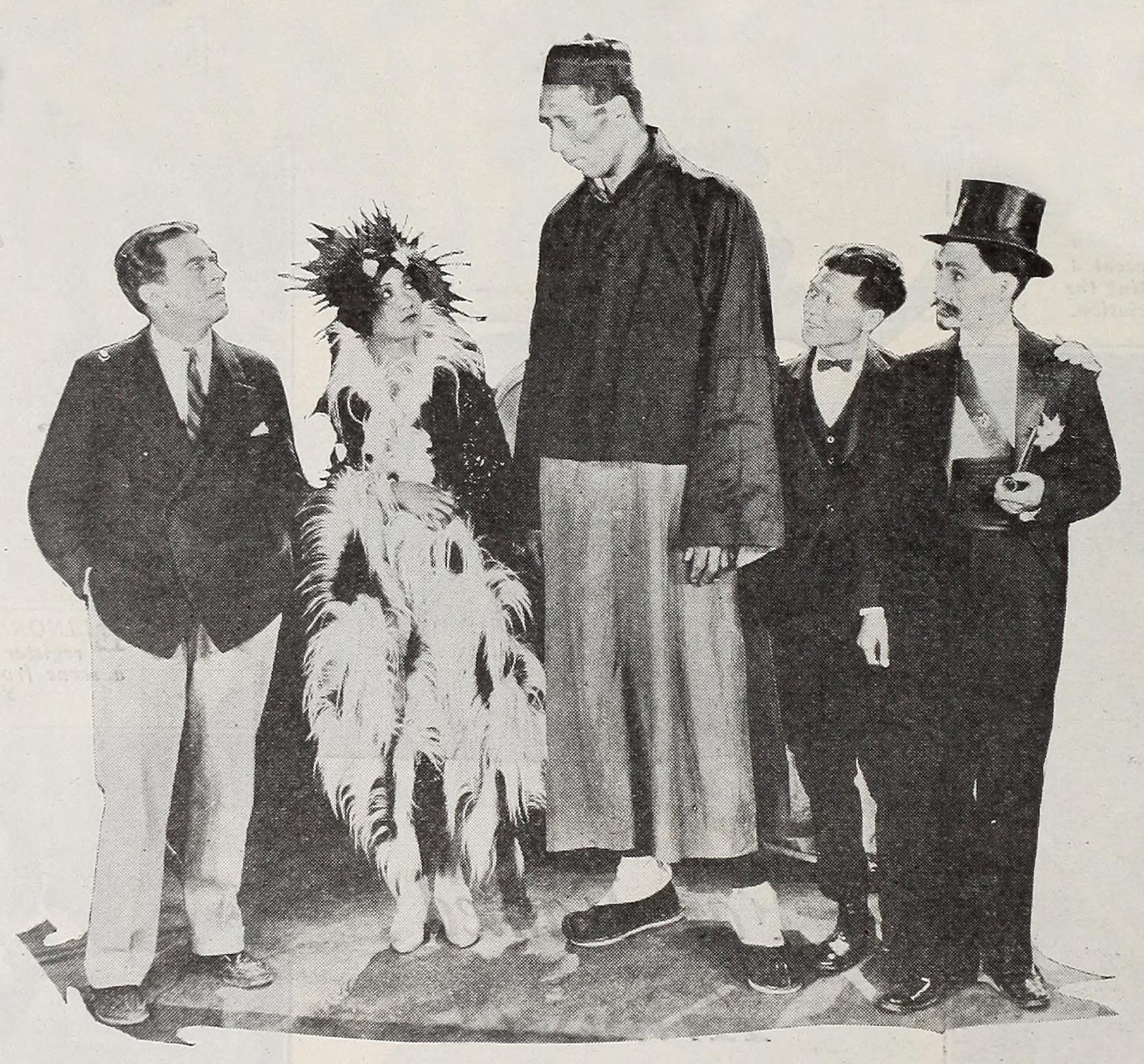
Kwan (fourth from left) with Matt Moore, Anna May Wong, Liu Yu Ching, and Sojin, 1927

The company also provided support for Isaac Upham when he produced a travel film based in China, which resulted in Kwan returning to the United States. Although Upham's film was unsuccessful, Kwan – through Anna May Wong, whom he had met on the set of The City of Dim Faces – became a technical consultant with MGM for Mr. Wu (1927). He returned to China later that year, again heading to Hong Kong.

=== Hong Kong ===
In 1931, Kwan helped establish the Hong Kong branch of the United Photoplay Service (UPS). Kwan worked as a writer and a director for the company, with his first production being Flame of Love (1931). Shot on a hand-held camera, the film advocated for marriages based on love rather than transactional intents. As the studio experienced financial difficulties, Kwan was dispatched to the United States to seek international distribution of its productions – including The 19th Route Army's Glorious Battle Against the Japanese Enemy and Humanity (both 1932) – and find investors.

While in the United States, Kwan met Joseph Sunn. Seeking to improve his understanding of sound films, Kwan asked Sunn to work with him on making a movie. They co-founded the Grandview Film Company, named after Kwan's hotel, in San Francisco in 1933. With Kwan's assistance, Zhao directed Blossom Time (1933), one of the first Cantonese-language talkies. Starring Kwan Tak-hing and Wu Dip-ying, it followed two Cantonese opera singers who fall in love while touring in the United States. The film was well received, and Kwan convinced Sunn and Lo Ming-yau of UPS to collaborate on future productions.

Kwan returned to Hong Kong with Sunn, showing him the city. In the mid-1930s, he toured Europe and the United States with Lo to obtain a better understanding of film production abroad. During this tour, the men also cultivated support from the Chinese diaspora for film production. When Lo decided to focus on developing UPS' Shanghai location, Kwan was unwilling to move. He did, however, agree to complete one final film for UPS: Singing Lovers (also Song of the Past, 1935). Kwan and Sunn thereafter focused on Grandview.

In the mid-1930s, as the Imperial Japanese Army was moving southward through China, Kwan directed the nationalist film Life Lines, a documentary starring Lee Yi-nin and Ng Cho-fan about Chinese resistance against Japanese forces. Due to the British government's efforts to avoid angering the Japanese, it was initially banned in Hong Kong until Kwan had this injunction overturned; the film was also shown in Chinatowns throughout North America. He subsequently directed a series of films with nationalist themes, including Resistant (1936), They'll Have Their Day (1936), Girl From West Lake (1937), For Duty's Sake (1937), and Enemy of Humanity (1938). Such films became commonplace through the late 1930s, with other examples coming from Zhao Shushen and the Tianyi Company.

In 1937, Kwan established the Hillmoon Film Company together with the opera actor Kwong Shan-siu. He also worked with a group of filmmakers, including Sunn, So Yee, and Chin Tai-soak, to advocate against the Kuomintang government's decision to ban the distribution of Cantonese-language films in the Republic of China; this policy had previously required the recutting of Life Lines prior to distribution in the mainland.

=== Later years and death ===
Kwan made another trip to the United States in 1939, travelling with Tso Yee-man to sell Hillmoon films. There, he worked with Esther Eng – who had been inspired to make her first film, Heartaches (1935), by Life Lines – to make Golden Gate Girl (1941). Kwan wrote the script for the film, which followed the everyday lives of San Francisco's Chinese community, served as co-director, and appeared in the film as a cameo. (Note: Also included in the film was Bruce Lee, then three months old (Lester 2023, p. 87).) When Hong Kong was occupied by the Japanese in 1941, Kwan was still in the United States. He returned to China via a circuitous route, spending the occupation as a teacher.

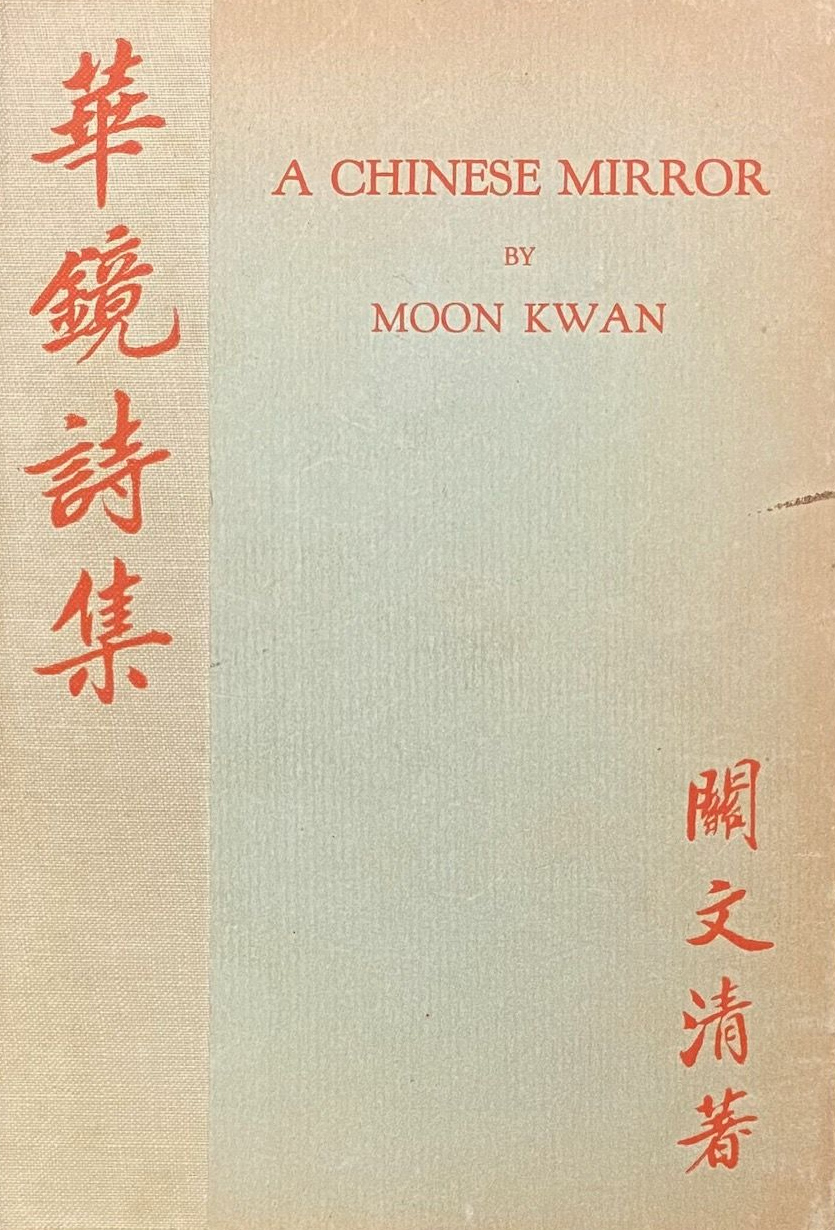
A Chinese Mirror (1932)

After the Second World War, Kwan continued his filmmaking, with works including the Hong Kong–made The War Ended (1947), Spring's Flight (1954), and Kwan-Ti, God of War (1956). His Is Parents' Love Ever Rewarded? (1955), identified by the film scholar Lisa Odham Stokes as one of his best-known films, starred Pak Suet-sin and Cheung Ying as a retired sing-song girl and businessman who quarrel over their family life. He directed his final film, Charlie Catches the Cat, in 1969, having reduced his output through much of the 1960s. Kwan published a memoir, titled An Unofficial History of the Chinese Silver Screen, in 1976. In the late 1980s, Kwan emigrated to the United States to reunite with his family. He died on 17 June 1995.

== Legacy ==
In the Encyclopedia of Chinese Film, the film critic Paul Fonoroff describes Kwan as one of early Hong Kong cinema's most influential directors. Kwan identified and nurtured potential talent, with protégés including Lee Tit and Wong Toi later becoming major figures in Hong Kong cinema. Most of his films, however, are lost.

Kwan published translations of works by such poets as Li Bai and Wang Wei in the magazine Poetry in the 1910s. He also wrote an English-language poem, dedicated to Witter Bynner, that was included in the book W.B. in California. At the time, much of the poetry written by ethnic Chinese authors in the United States was written in Cantonese; Kwan and Jiang Kanghu were among the few to write in English. Jason Lester of the University of Oregon describes The Jade Pagoda as the first English-language poetry collection penned by a person of Chinese descent. This work was edited and republished as A Chinese Mirror: Poems and Plays in 1932, with reprintings continuing as late as 1971.

In 2024, Kwan was portrayed by Ron Song in Unbroken Blossoms, a play written by Philip W. Chung for the East West Players. This work of historical fiction dramaticizes the experiences of Kwan and James B. Leong (played by Gavin K. Lee) as technical consultants for Griffith's Broken Blossoms.

== Filmography ==
From 1926 through 1969, Kwan directed more than fifty films, the majority of which were in Cantonese. The following list is derived from The Ultimate Guide to Hong Kong Film Directors, 1914–1978.

- Newfound Wealth from a Newborn (添丁發財, 1926)
- Iron Bone and Orchid Heart (鐵骨蘭心, 1931)
- Gunshot at Midnight (夜半槍聲, 1932)
- The Shining Pearl (暗室明珠, 1933)
- Breaking Waves (破浪, 1934)
- The Modern Bride (摩登新娘, 1935)
- The Modern Bride, Part Two (摩登新娘續集, 1935)
- Life Lines (生命線, 1935)
- Third Madame Educates Her Son (三娘教子, 1935)
- The Bandits of Shandong (山東響馬, 1936)
- Killing Gossip (人言可畏, 1936)
- Resist! (抵抗, 1936)
- Bloodstained Money (血洒金錢, 1936)
- The Lady from West Lake (西湖女, 1937)
- The Modern Wu Dalang (摩登武大郎, 1937)
- The Mad Director (狂導演, 1937)
- Blood and Tears at the Border (邊防血淚, 1937)
- Among the Dispossessed (如此人間, 1937)
- Public Enemy (公敵, 1938)
- The Golden-Leaf Chrysanthemum (金葉菊, 1938)
- Woe to the Debauched! (閻瑞生, 1938)
- At the Parting of the Ways (柴米夫妻, 1938)
- The Golden-Leaf Chrysanthemum, Part Two (金葉菊續集, 1939)
- The Beautiful General (脂粉將軍, 1939)
- For Love or Money (杜十娘怒沉百寶箱, 1939)
- Grave of the Sisters-in-Law (姑嫂墳, 1939), with Wong Tit-yee
- Golden Gate Girl (金門女, 1941), with Esther Eng
- Tears of the Returned One (復員淚, 1947)
- New Lifeline (新生命線, 1948)
- The Groom and His Double (真假新郎, 1948)
- The Lusty Thief Girl (風流女賊, 1948)
- Mr Kwangtung Exposes the Corrupt Temple (廣東先生大破謀人寺, 1948)
- The Second Attempt (再折長亭柳, 1948), with Tam Pak-yip
- Third Madame Educates Her Son (三娘教子, 1949)
- The Rude Monk's Intrusion into Mount Wutai (花和尚大鬧五台山, 1950)
- Born Again (重生, 1950), with Kam King-yu
- Sorrows of a Neglected Wife (冷落斷腸花, 1950)
- An Orphan's Sad Tale (孤雛淚, 1951)
- Poor Mother (難為了媽媽, 1951)
- Between Her Own and the Concubine's Children (嫡庶之間難為母, 1952)
- Wealth Gone Like a Dream (十載繁華一夢銷, 1952)
- Daughter of a Humble House (蓬門小鳳, 1952)
- The Flight of the Swallows (離巢燕, 1953)
- Her Last Request (殘花淚, 1953)
- Tragedy of Divorce (離婚淚, 1954)
- Spring's Flight (落花流水, 1954)
- Orchid of the Valley (空谷蘭, 1954)
- The Kid and the Vagabond Dog (愛樂流浪記, 1954)
- Li Sanniang: Remake (新李三娘, 1955)
- Romance in the Western Chamber (春色滿西廂, 1955)
- The Mystery of the Human Head (人頭奇案, 1955)
- Is Parents' Love Ever Rewarded? (簷前滴水, 1955)
- Love and Hate between Man and a Faithful Dog (人犬恩仇, 1955)
- The Burning of Biyun Palace (火燒碧雲宮, 1955)
- Filial Piety (孝道, 1956)
- Kwan-ti, God of War (關公月下釋貂蟬, 1956), with Joseph Sunn
- General Kwan Escorts His Sister-in-Law on a Thousand-Mile Journey (關公千里送嫂, 1957), with Joseph Sunn
- An Immortal Refuses Love (韓湘子雪夜過情關, 1958)
- Poor Mother (可憐的媽媽, 1961)
- Girl in Danger (危巢小鳳, 1962)
- Charlie Catches the Cat (差利捉貓記, 1969)

== Works cited ==
- Chung, Stephanie (2022). "From Silent Films to Talkies: Rediscovering Moon Kwan Man-ching". Exploring Hong Kong Films of the 1930s and 1940s: Part 1: Era and Film History (PDF). Translated by Chin, Roberta. Hong Kong: Hong Kong Film Archive. pp. 32–49. ISBN 978-962-8050-77-2. Archived from the original (PDF) on 15 March 2023.
- "關文清 Moon Kwan / Kwan Man Ching (1896–1995)". 香港電影導演大全, 1914-1978 [The Ultimate Guide to Hong Kong Film Directors, 1914–1978] (in Chinese). Hong Kong: Hong Kong Film Directors Guild. 2018. ISBN 978-988-12666-0-6.
- "Moon Kwan Man Ching" (PDF). Film Archive, Government of Hong Kong. Archived from the original (PDF) on 17 February 2024.
- Lee, Ashley (5 July 2024). "Play Goes Behind the Scenes on 'Blossoms'; East West Players Premiere Explores Chinese Presence in Early Hollywood". Los Angeles Times. p. E1. ProQuest 3075814322.
- Lester, Jason (2023). Experiments with China in American Modernity (Thesis). University of Oregon.
- Lin, Zhu (2019). "Between Hong Kong and San Francisco: A Transnational Approach to Early Chinese Diasporic Cinema". Canadian Journal of History. 54 (3): 345–371. doi:10.3138/cjh.ach.54.3.2019-0017.
- Stokes, Lisa Odham (2007). "Kwan, Man-ching". Historical Dictionary of Hong Kong Cinema. London: Scarecrow Press. pp. 207–208. ISBN 978-0-8 108-5520-5.
- Fonoroff, Paul (1998). "Hong Kong Cinema". In Zhang, Yingjin; Xiao, Zhiwei (eds.). Encyclopedia of Chinese Film. New York, London: Routledge. pp. 31–46. ISBN 978-0-415-15168-9.
- Zhang, Yinjing (1998a). "Transnational Cinema". In Zhang, Yingjin; Xiao, Zhiwei (eds.). Encyclopedia of Chinese Film. New York, London: Routledge. pp. 63–65. ISBN 978-0-415-15168-9.
- Zhang, Yinjing (1998b). "Kwan Man-ching". In Zhang, Yingjin; Xiao, Zhiwei (eds.). Encyclopedia of Chinese Film. New York, London: Routledge. p. 209. ISBN 978-0-415-15168-9.
