= Kwun-Ling Chow =

Chinese-American actress and opera singer

- Chinese: 周坤玲
- Born: 1924; United States
- Died: 2020 (aged 95–96)
- Other names: Patricia Joe, Chow Kwan-Ling, Chow Kwun-ling, Joe Quan-Ling, Kunling Zhou
- Occupations: Cantonese opera singer; actress
- Years active: 1946–1964
- Spouse: Wong Chiu-Miu

Kwun-Ling Chow (Chinese: 周坤玲), also known as Patricia Joe was an American-Cantonese-born Chinese actress and opera singer.

== Early life ==
Chow was born in Hawaii in 1924 and grew up in California.

== Career ==
At an early age, Chow learned Cantonese opera in California and performed in San Francisco, California and other West Coast cities in the United States. In 1946, Chow crossed over as an actress at Grandview Film Company Limited (U.S. Branch) in California, and the films were released in Hong Kong. Chow first appeared in The Entangling Ones, a 1946 comedy film directed by Chiu Shu-San. Chow's first appeared as a lead Cantonese opera singer in Happy Wedding, a 1947 Cantonese opera film directed by Chiang Wai-Kwong. Chow's last film was The Dragon and the Bat, a 1964 Historical Drama film directed by Yeung Hak. Chow is credited with over 180 films.

In the 1950s, Chow became a businesswoman in the restaurant business.

== Filmography ==
=== Films ===
This is a partial list of films.

- 1946 The Entangling Ones
- 1947 Happy Wedding
- 1947 Lucky Bride
- 1949 The Ancient Beauty, Meng Lijun
- 1953 The Marriage of the Fool's Daughter
- 1953 Why Not Return? (a.k.a. The Reunion of a Bitter Couple)
- 1962 The Capture of the Evil Demons
- 1962 Girl in Danger
- 1964 The Dragon and the Bat

== Personal life ==
In 1947, Chow moved to Hong Kong. Chow's husband was Wong Chiu-Miu, an actor. In the 1950s, Chow and her family returned to California.
