= Lee Tit =

Cantonese film director (1913–1996)

Lee Tit (Chinese: 李鐵; pinyin: Lǐ Tiě; 1913–1996) was a Chinese director who worked primarily in the Hong Kong film scene.

== Early life ==
In 1913, Lee was born in Guangdong, China.

== Career ==
Between 1936 and 1977 he directed over 70 films. Three of his films were named in the Hong Kong Film Awards' list of the Best 100 Chinese Motion Pictures. In the Face of Demolition (1953) placed 18th, The Purple Hairpin (1959) placed 51st, and Feast of a Rich Family (1959), which he co-directed with Lee Sun-Fung, Ng Wui and Lo Ji-Hung, placed 84th.

== Selected filmography ==
- 1936: House Number 66 (aka The Case of the Dismembered Body) - Director.
- 1952: Girl in Red (Chinese: 一丈紅) - Director.
- 1953: In the Face of Demolition
- 1963: The Millionaire's Daughter - Director

== Awards ==
- Star. Avenue of Stars. Tsim Sha Tsui waterfront in Hong Kong.

== Personal life ==
On 27 September 1996, Lee died in Hong Kong.
