= Ng Wui =

Chinese film director, writer and actor from Hong Kong

- Chinese: 吳回
- Born: China
- Died: Hong Kong
- Other names: Ng Woi, Ng Hwui, Ng Woy, Ng Wun, Wu Hui, Wui Ng
- Occupations: Film director; writer; actor

Ng Wui (December 3, 1913 - March 1, 1996) was a Hong Kong film director, writer and actor, best known for his films of the 1950s and 1960s. He is credited with over 200 films under his direction.

== Filmography ==
=== Films ===
- 1952 The Prodigal Son - Director
- 1954 Madam Yun (aka Madam Wan, Six Chapters of a Floating Life) - Director.
- 1957 The Thunderstorm - Director
- 1959 Daughter of a Grand Household (aka The Missing Cinderella) - Yu's boss. Also Director.
- 1959 The Road (aka One Mind, One Heart, Road) - Head of Japanese troops. Also as Director, screenwriter.
- 1967 The Divorce Brinkmanship (Chinese: 离婚之喜) - Director
- 1967 Miss. Mr. Mrs. - Screenwriter, director.
- 1967 They Fought Shoulder to Shoulder - Also as director.
- 1977 No Money No Talk - Director.

As actor

- Xuelei Qinghua (1939)
- Nanguo zimei hua (1939) - Siu Dip's father
- Gumu Yuanhun (1939)
- Heiye Shaxing (1939)
- Baoqing Lane (1939)
- Zhanlong Yuxian Ji (1940)
- Zhao Zilong (1940)
- Renhai Leihen (1940)
- Hua jie shen nu (1941)
- Ruan shi san xiong (1941)
- Roar of the People (1941)
- Minzu de Housheng (1941)
- Liuwang Zhi Ge (1941)
- Ye Shang Hai (1941)
- Fenghuo Guxiang (1941)
- Xuegong Chunse (1941)
- Tianshang Renjian (1941)
- Kuangfeng Yuhou Hua (1947)
- Huo shao lian huan chuan (1951)
- Leng yue ban lang gui (1952)
- Ri chu (1953) - Huang Shengsan
- Chun (1953) - Cheng Kwok-gwong
- Yun niang (1954)
- Ping ji (1954) - Yee Suk
- Liang di xiang si (1955)
- Kong que dong nan fei (1956)
- Gou hun shi zhe (1956)
- Qi chong tian (1956) - Mouse
- The Thunderstorm (1957) - Lu Kuei
- Shui hu zhuan: Zhi qu sheng chen gang (1957)
- Feng huo jia ren (1958)
- Da dong gua (1958)
- A Chao jie hun (1958)
- Lu (1959)
- Du zhang fu (1959) - Chief Inspector
- Qi xiao fu (1961)
- Bu bu zhui zong (1962)
- Nan de you qing lang (1962) - Kei
- Niu ji xin niang (1962)
- Chun dao ren jian (1963) - Ying's father
- Guai xia yan zi fei (1963)
- Bo ming hong yan (1963)
- Zuo ye meng hun zhong (1963) - Sheng
- Xiang cheng yan shi (1964)
- Nan hun nu jia (1964)
- Yi chan yi bai wan (1966)
- Bian cheng san xia (1966)
- Fei zei bai ju hua (1969)
- Jia yi (1970)
- Mi ren de ai qing (1970)
- Heung gong chat sup sam (1974)
- Sing gei cha low (1974)
- Gou yao gou gu (1978)
- Shi ba (1980) - Uncle Ching
- Lao chen dang wang (1981)
- Hua sha (1982)
- Gu shou (1983)
- Hui mie hao di che (1983)
- The Home at Hong Kong (1983)
- Ai nu xin zhuan (1984)
- Lo foo chut gaam (1989)
- Tin joek yau ching (1990)
- Ge ge de qing ren (1992)
- A Moment of Romance II (1993) - Butler
- The Bare-Footed Kid (1993)
- Hail the Judge (1994) - Lung-Sing's Dad (final film role)
