= Sam-Ku To =

Chinese actress and opera singer (1895–1983)

- Chinese: 陶三姑
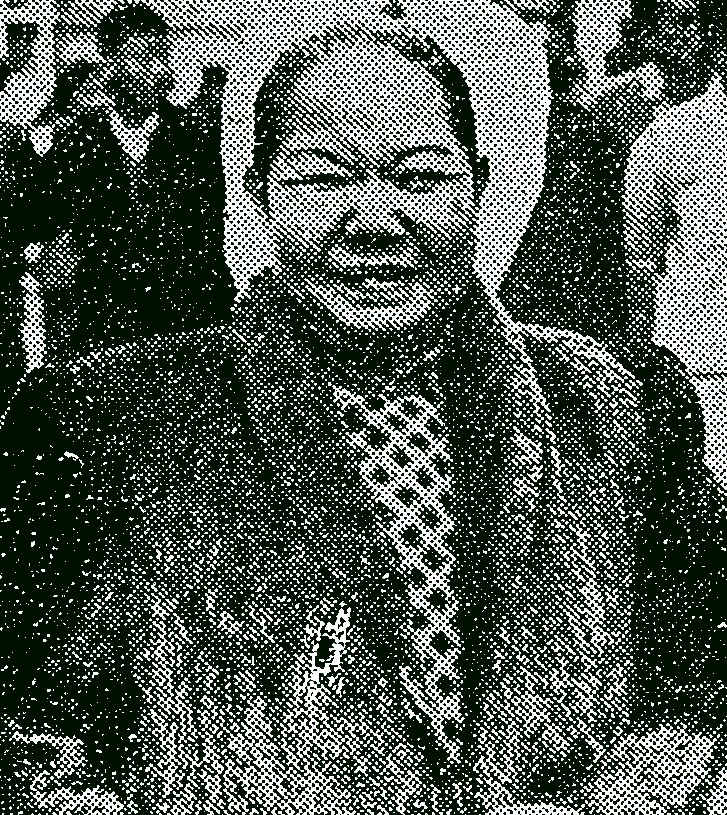
- Portrait of To
- Born: 1895; Guangdong, China
- Died: 1983 (aged 87–88); British Hong Kong
- Other names: To Sam Ku, To Sam-Ku, To Sam Gu, To Ying, Tao Sangu, Tao San-Gu, Tiu Saam Goo
- Occupation: Actress
- Years active: 1936–1978

Sam-Ku To (Chinese: 陶三姑) (1895–1983) is a former Chinese actress and Cantonese opera singer from Hong Kong. To is credited with over 440 films.

== Early life ==
In 1895, To was born.

== Career ==
To started her career as a Cantonese opera singer. In 1936, To crossed over as an actress in Hong Kong films. To appeared in A Fisherman's Girl, a 1936 drama film directed by Wen Yi-Min. To is known for her role as a greedy mother, brothel madam, or landlady. To appeared as a landlady in films such as The Corn in Ripe for Plucking (1948), Four Phoenixes Take Flight (1948), Hanging on Together (1949), A Devoted Soul (Part 1 and Part 2) (1949), and Blood, Rouge and Tears (1950). To's last film was Dog Bites Dog Bone, a 1978 drama film directed by Michael Lai Siu-Tin and Nancy Sit Ka-Yin. To is credited with over 440 films.

== Filmography ==
=== Films ===
This is a partial list of films.

- 1936 A Fisherman's Girl
- 1937 The Light of Women
- 1940 The Red Scarf
- 1947 The Evil Mind – Tung Sam-Ku
- 1948 The Corn in Ripe for Plucking – Landlady
- 1948 Four Phoenixes Take Flight – Landlady
- 1949 Hanging on Together – Landlady
- 1949 A Devoted Soul (Part 1 and Part 2) – Landlady
- 1950 Blood, Rouge and Tears – Landlady
- 1952 Sweet Girl and Good Car (aka Beautiful Woman, Beautiful Car)
- 1953 In the Face of Demolition
- 1955 Sing Her a Love Song
- 1956 Madam Mei – Brothel madam
- 1960 The Eagle Knight and the Crimson Girl – Madam Chiu
- 1962 The Adventure of a Stage-fan (aka The Venture of an Opera Fan) – Landlady
- 1964 Pigeon Cage (aka The Apartment of 14 Families) – Landlady
- 1978 Dog Bites Dog Bone

== Personal life ==
On March 13, 1983, To died.
