= Lan-Hing Tam =

Chinese actress and Cantonese opera singer

- Chinese: 譚蘭卿
- Born: Tam Shui-fen; January 12, 1911
- Died: March 13, 1981 (aged 70); Hong Kong
- Other names: Tam Lan-Hing, Tam Shui-Fan, Tan Lan-Hing, Plumpy Lan
- Occupations: Cantonese opera singer; actress
- Years active: 1921–1969

Lan-Hing Tam (Chinese: 譚蘭卿) (12 January 1911 – 13 March 1981) was a Chinese actress and Cantonese opera singer from Hong Kong. Tam was credited with over 190 films.

== Early life ==
In 1911, Tam was born as Tam Shui-fen.

== Career ==
Tam started her career as a "fa dan" role in Cantonese opera. In 1935, Tam crossed over as an actress in Hong Kong films. Tam first appeared in Scent of Wild Flowers, a 1935 drama film directed by So Yi. Tam first appeared as a comedian actress in Modern Girl Seeks Husband, a 1939 comedy film directed by So Yi. As a comedian, Tam is known to utilize her overweight physical feature for comedy effects. Tam earned a nickname of "Plumpy Lan". Tam cross-dressed as a male and appeared as Tang general Ching Ngau-kam in Fan Lei-Fa, the Female General (aka Fan Li-Fa, The Story of Heroine Fan Lei-fa), a 1968 Cantonese opera film directed by Fung Chi-Kong. Tam's last film was Money from Heaven, a 1969 comedy film directed by Ng Wui. Tam is credited with over 190 films.

== Filmography ==
=== Films ===
This is a partial list of films.

- 1935 Scent of Wild Flowers
- 1939 Rivals in Love – mother
- 1941 A Mother's Madness
- 1956 Fatty Marries Skinny (aka Fatso Married Skinny) – Secretary
- 1957 The Fairy in the Picture – Mother
- 1957 Romance of Jade Hall (Part 1) (aka My Kingdom for a Husband) – Lolo
- 1959 A Stroke of Romance for Mr. Wong – wife
- 1959 Daughter of a Grand Household (aka The Missing Cinderella) – Hung's aunt
- 1960 Silly Wong Growing Rich – Ho Bit-Siu
- 1960 The Stubborn Generations – Madam Tang
- 1962 Matrimonial Storm (aka To Plunder a Wife) – Madam Ho
- 1962 The Thunderous Night – Snobbish mother of a soldier
- 1962 To Capture the God of Wealth (aka Fake Saviour) – Wife
- 1963 Three Fools Searching for Their Daughter – Mother
- 1964 Filial Sons and Grandchildren (aka Our Family) – Snobbish mother-in-law
- 1968 Fan Lei-Fa, the Female General (aka Fan Li-Fa, The Story of Heroine Fan Lei-fa) – Tang general Ching Ngau-kam, Cross-dressed as a male
- 1969 Money from Heaven

== Personal life ==
In 1981, Tam died in Hong Kong.
