= Man-lei Wong =

Chinese actress from Hong Kong

- Chinese: 黃曼梨
- Born: 1913; Hong Kong
- Died: 1998 (aged 84–85); Hong Kong
- Other names: Huang Man Li, Wong Lan -yan, Wong Maan Lee, Wong Man Lei, Wong Man-lei, Wong Man-Li, Wong Man-so, Mary Je, Sister Mary, Mary Wong
- Occupation: Actress
- Years active: 1930–1986
- Known for: Co-founder of Union Film Enterprise

Man-lei Wong (Chinese: 黃曼梨) was a Chinese actress from Hong Kong. Wong was credited with over 300 films. Wong had a star at Avenue of Stars in Hong Kong.

== Early life ==
In 1913, Wong was born in Hong Kong.

== Education ==
Wong attended Belilios Teachers College, an Italian missionary college.

== Career ==
In 1930, at age 17, Wong's acting career began in silent film in Shanghai, China. Wong appeared in Burns the White-Bird Temple (1930) and 24 Heroes (1930). In 1932, Wong became a Hong Kong actress. Wong played a rich girl in silent film Gunshot at Midnight (1932) directed by Kwan Man-ching and she was Chiu Ching-Ha in Cry of the Cuckoo in the Temple (1932) directed by Leung Siu-Bo. In 1935, Wong was Yuet Han in Yesterday's Song, a talking Cantonese drama film directed by Chiu Shu-San. In 1952, Wong co-founded Union Film Enterprise. Wong's last notable film is Sword That Vanquished The Monster, a 1969 film directed by Wu Pang. Wong is credited with over 300 films. Wong is notable for her role as an obnoxious mother-in-law and elderly woman.

== Filmography ==
=== Films ===
This is a partial list of films.

- 1930 Burns the White-Bird Temple
- 1930 24 Heroes
- 1932 Gunshot at Midnight - Rich girl
- 1932 Cry of the Cuckoo in the Temple - Chiu Ching-Ha
- 1936 New Youth
- 1947 The Fickle Lady - Lok Kuen-See
- 1953 A Flower Reborn
- 1954 Spring's Flight
- 1955 Cold Nights (Chinese: 寒夜) - Man Suen's mother
- 1955 Parents' Hearts (Chinese: 父母心) - Mother
- 1956 The House of Sorrows
- 1956 The Wall - Mrs. Kong
- 1956 Wilderness - Blind mother
- 1959 The Fake Marriage (aka Great Pretender)
- 1959 Money (aka Qian) - Chiu's wife
- 1961 Long Live the Money - Chui's mother
- 1962 Vampire Woman (Chinese: 吸血婦) - Madam Chiu
- 1964 The Paradise Hotel
- 1964 A Mad Woman (Chinese: 瘋婦) - Madam Wong
- 1965 Doomed Love (aka A Love's Tragedy) (Chinese: 情天劫) - Au Oi-Ching
- 1966 No Greater Love than Filial Piety
- 1966 Love Burst - Kong's aunt
- 1969 Sword That Vanquished the Monster
- 1986 Dream Lovers (Chinese: 夢中人) - Lei's blind grandmother

== Awards ==
- 1995 Lifetime Achievement Award – Presented by Hong Kong Film Awards
- Star – Avenue of Stars, Tsim Sha Tsui waterfront in Hong Kong

== Personal life ==
During the Japanese occupation in December 1941, Wong fled to Macau, then lived in Guangzhouwan, and then Vietnam. In 1946, Wong returned to live in Hong Kong.

On April 8, 1998, Wong died in Hong Kong.

== See also ==
- Hong Kong Film Award for Lifetime Achievement
- Yin Pak
