= Yuet-ching Lee =

Chinese actress from Hong Kong

- Chinese: 李月清
- Born: 1913; Hengyang, Hunan, China
- Died: 26 August 1997 (aged 83–84)
- Other names: Lee Yuet Ching, Li Yuet-Ching
- Occupation: Actress
- Years active: 1937–1986
- Spouse: Lee Sun-fung

Yuet-ching Lee (Chinese: 李月清) (1913 – 26 August 1997) was a Chinese actress from Hong Kong. Lee is credited with over 300 films.

== Career ==
In 1937, Lee began acting in Hong Kong. Lee's early films include Producing Citizens, a 1937 film directed by Lee Fa, and A Mother's Tears, a 1938 film directed by Chiu Shu-San. In 1941, Lee co-starred with Lee Sun-fung for the first time in The Metropolis. Lee was in Three Heroes, a 1941 film directed by Lee Sun-fung, who is also her husband. From 1942 to 1946, Lee was not active in the film industry. In 1960, Lee was in The Orphan, the notable last film Bruce Lee acted before he left Hong Kong. By 1969, Lee was credited with over 300 films in Hong Kong. Lee also acted in films directed by her husband. In 1986, Lee was Mrs Lam's mother in Inspector Chocolate, a comedy thriller directed by Phillip Chan.

== Personal life ==
Lee's husband was Lee Sun-fung, a film director. They have 5 children. During the Japanese occupation, Lee and her family fled to Guangzhouwan. Afterwards, Lee and her family moved to Vietnam. In the 1940s, Lee and her family moved to Hong Kong. Lee's third son is Sil-hong Lee. On 21 May 1985, Lee's husband died.

== Filmography ==
=== Films ===
This is a partial list of films.

- 1937 Producing Citizens
- 1938 A Mother's Tears
- 1939 Twin Sisters of the South - Mrs. Chow
- 1940 Everlasting Love
- 1941 The Metropolis
- 1941 Three Heroes
- 1941 Follow Your Dream - Landlord's wife
- 1947 Flowers After the Storm
- 1947 Tears for the Impossible Love
- 1947 The Young Couple - Sophia's mother
- 1947 The Fickle Lady
- 1947 Romance from Heaven
- 1947 The Fearless - Sau Chu's mother
- 1947 The Romantic Thief, Bai Juhua - Madam Shum
- 1948 The Crazy Match-maker (a.k.a. The Crazy Matchmaker, Woman Dismantles White)
- 1952 Night of Romance - Aunt
- 1953 In the Face of Demolition
- 1955 Cold Nights (Chinese: 寒夜) - Mrs. Cheung
- 1955 The Faithful Wife
- 1960 The Orphan
- 1960 The Book and the Sword (Part 1)
- 1960 The Book and the Sword (Part 2)
- 1964 The Beau (Chinese: 花花公子) - Ka Bo's mother
- 1967 The Divorce Brinkmanship
- 1969 From Here to Eternity
- 1972 Four Girls from Hong Kong - Pei-Hua's mother
- 1986 Inspector Chocolate - Mrs Lam's mother
