= Yin Pak =

Chinese actress from Hong Kong

- Chinese: 白燕
- Born: 1920; Guangzhou, Guangdong, China
- Died: 1987 (aged 66–67); British Hong Kong
- Other names: Pak Yin, Baak Yin, Bai Yan, Pah Yin, Bai Yin, Pei Yien
- Occupations: Actress; producer
- Years active: 1936–1980
- Known for: Co-founder of Union Film Enterprise and Shan Luen Motion Picture Company

Yin Pak (Chinese: 白燕) was a Chinese actress and producer from Hong Kong. She was credited with over 300 films and had a star at Avenue of Stars in Hong Kong.

== Early life ==
In 1920, Pak was born as Chan Yuk Ping in Guangzhou, China.

== Career ==
In 1936, Pak began her acting career in Guangzhou, China. In 1937, Pak became a Hong Kong actress and debuted in The Magnificent Country, a 1937 war film directed by Chan Tin. In 1952, Pak co-founded Union Film Enterprise. Pak received the First Class Individual Achievement Award from People's Republic of China for her role in Spring (1953), a historical drama directed by Lee Sun-fung. In 1954, Pak founded Shan Luen Motion Picture Company, and it produced Madam Yun (1954) as the first film in the same year and Pak played the role of Madam Yun. Pak is known as the diva of Cantonese cinema of the 1950s and '60s. In 1964, Pak retired from acting. Pak is credited with over 300 films. Pak is notable for her role as a devoted wife in her films.

== Filmography ==
=== Films ===
This is a partial list of films.

- 1937 The Magnificent Country
- 1938 Shanghai Under Fire
- 1953 Spring - Chow Wai
- 1954 Madam Yun (Chinese: 芸娘) - Madam Yun
- 1955 Cold Nights (Chinese: 寒夜) - Tsang Shu Sang
- 1957 Thunderstorm -Lui Shi-ping
- 1958 Marriage on the Rocks (Chinese: 婚變) - Chan Sin-Man
- 1960 The Orphan - Teacher
- 1960 Madam Wan
- 1960 The Great Devotion - Lee Yuk-Mei
- 1964 A Mad Woman (Chinese: 瘋婦)

== Awards ==
- First Class Individual Achievement Award for her role in Spring (1953). Presented by the Cultural Ministry of the People's Republic of China
- Star. Avenue of Stars, Tsim Sha Tsui waterfront in Hong Kong

== Personal life ==
On May 6, 1987, Pak died.

== See also ==
- Man-lei Wong
