= List of Hong Kong films of 1967 =

A list of films produced in Hong Kong in 1967:

== 1967 ==
Title	Director	Cast	Genre	Notes
1967
A Gifted Scholar and a Beautiful Maid (aka Merry Maid)	Wong Hok-Sing	Connie Chan, Ng Kwun-Lai, So Siu-Tong, Lee Heung-kam, Luk Fei-Hung, Hui Ying-Sau, Ko Lo-Chuen, Lai Man, Wan Ling-Kwong	Historical Drama	
A Girl's Secret	Siu Sang	Connie Chan, Kenneth Tsang Kong, Do Ping, Lydia Shum, Lau Ching, Gam Lui, Lok Gung, Tang Ti, Hui Ying-Ying	Action	
A Sweet Girl	Chiang Wai-Kwong	Josephine Siao, Wu Fung, Adam Cheng, Alice Au Yin-Ching, Lai Man, Yung Yuk-Yi, Hui Ying-Ying	Musical Comedy	
Adventure of a Blind Kid	Mok Hong-See	Petrina Fung Bo-Bo, Ho Lan, Fong Sam, Ko Ming	Drama	
Adventures Of A Scholar	Law Gwan Hung			
Adventures of Sun Ma-chai (aka How Ximma Zai Was Insulted During His Date)	Chan Cheuk-Sang	Sun-Ma Sze-Tsang, Lee Hung, Cheng Kwun-Min, Lee Heung-Kam	Comedy	
Angel With The Iron Fists	Lo Wei	Lily Ho, Fanny Fan Lai, Tang Ching, Tina Chin Fei, Lo Wei	Mandarin Thriller	
Asia-Pol	Mak Chi Woh, Mastuo Shoden	Hideaki Nitani, Jô Shishido, Ruriko Asaoka, Yin Fang, Hsieh Wang	Drama	
The Assassin	Chang Cheh	Jimmy Wang Yu, Lisa Chiao Chiao, Li Hsiang-Chun, Lin Jing, Chiu Sam-Yin, Man Sau, Hung Ling-Ling	Martial Arts	
Auntie Lan	Griffin Yueh Feng	Fang Ying, Lily Ho, Paul Chang Chung, Kiu Chong, Jimmy Wang Yu, Wong Ching-Ho	Drama	
The Bandits	San Seung Yuk			
Beauty's Trap				
The Black And The White Cats	Lung To	Connie Chan, Kenneth Tsang Kong, Fong Ling-Yuk, Do Ping, Alice Au Yin-Ching, Seung-Goon Yuk	Action	
Black Falcon	Takumi Furukawa	Jenny Hu Yan-Ni, Margaret Tu Chuan, Paul Chang Chung	Action	
The Black Killer	Chiang Wai-Kwong	Connie Chan, Sek Kin, Adam Cheng, Lam Kau, Yip Ching, Ma Siu-Ying, Alice Au, Lok Gung, Sze-Ma Wah-Lung, Tsang Choh-Lam	Action	
The Black Swan	Ling Yun (born 1925)	Connie Chan, Cheung Ching, Pai Ying, Lok Gung, Sze-Ma Wah-Lung, Gam Lui, Gam Lau, Fung Ging-Man, Lai Man, Tsang Choh-Lam, Lau Kar-Leung, Kong Bo-Lin	Action	
Blood Stains The Iron Fist (aka The Anti-Poison Heroine)	Lo Yu Chi	Josephine Siao, Lui Kei, Sek Kin, Suet Nei	Action	
The Blue Bees (aka Operation Blue Wasp, The Blue Poisonous Bees)	Chiang Wai-Kwong	Wu Fung, Josephine Siao, Fanny Fan Lai, Roy Chiao Hung, Ding Wai, Suen Shing, Lee Ying, Kwan Yan, Gam Lui	Action	
Blue Skies	Sit Kwan	Peter Chen Ho, Cheng Pei-Pei, Margaret Tu Chuan	Musical Comedy	
Bomb in Pink (aka Pink Bomb)	Mok Hong-See	Wu Fung, So Ching, Fanny Fan Lai, Roy Chiao Hung, Seung-Goon Yuk	Action	
The Brave Girl	Lo Yu-Kei	Connie Chan, Lui Kei, Fong Sam, Kwan Hoi-San, Sek Kin, Lok Gung, Sze-Ma Wah-Lung, Yung Yuk-Yi, Cheng Kwun-Min, Ma Siu-Ying	Action	
The Brave Tanks (aka 509 Tank Forces)	Kim Dong-Hak	Shin Young-Kyun, Ting Ying, Cheung Ying-Tsoi	War	
Broadcast Queen	Wong Yiu	Wan Fong-Ling, Lui Kei, Cheng Kwun-Min, Nancy Sit, Lydia Shum, Ko Lo-Chuen, Ma Siu-Ying, Yung Yuk-Yi, Yue Ming, Woo Ping	Drama	
Bunny Girl	Chan Wan	Lui Kei, Nancy Sit, Fong Sam, Lai Man, Helena Law Lan, Hui Ying-Ying, Yeung Chun-Sing, Leung Sau-Wah, Wong Oi-Ming	Musical Comedy	
The Butterfly Legend	Chu Kei	Patricia Lam, Yim-hing Law, Chuang Shueh-Chuang, Sek Ling, Kwan Hoi-San, Ling Mung, Simon Yuen Siu-Tin, Pak Man-Biu, Chow Gat, Chan Chui-Bing, Cheung Sing-Fei	Cantonese opera	
The Cave of the Silken Web	Ho Meng Hua	Ho Fan, Angela Yu Chien	Fantasy	
The Charming Little Bird (aka The Young Lovers, The Charming Bird)	Wong Yiu	Connie Chan, Lui Kei, Erica Lee Man, Cheung Ching, Mak Gei, Cheng Kwun-Min	Musical Romance	
Diamond Robbery	Chor Yuen	Patrick Tse, Josephine Siao, Chan Tsai-Chung, Lee Hang, Lee Pang-Fei, Leung Ming, Man Leng, Wong Hon, Yeung Yip-Wang, Chu Siu-Boh, Chan Leung-Chung	Crime	
The Divorce Brinkmanship	Ng Wui	Pak Yan, Kong Hon, Fung Chan, Keung Chung-Ping, Lo Duen	Comedy	
Every Girl a Romantic Dreamer	Chan Cheuk-Sang	Nancy Sit, Kenneth Tsang Kong, Lydia Shum, James Yi Lui, Ho Lan, Ko Lo-Chuen, Ma Siu-Ying, Yue Ming, Lin Hui, Ko Fung, Ko Ming, Little Unicorn, Kong Yi, Anna Tam On-Na, Lai Yuet-Sim	Musical	
Family Man	Chan Man	Chow Chung, Kong Suet, Man Lan, Yue Ming, Ma Siu-Ying, Lee Pang-Fei, Yung Yuk-Yi, Lai Man	Romantic Comedy	
Finding a Wife in a Blind Way	Chan Cheuk-Sang	Sun-Ma Sze-Tsang, Lee Hung, Yue Ming, Ko Lo-Chuen, Gam Lui, Hung Hung, Lai Man, Hui Ying-Ying, Lydia Shum, Sai Gwa-Pau, Ma Chiu-Chi	Comedy	
First Love (aka Bitter Romance)	Mok Hong-See	Connie Chan, Lui Kei, Tam Bing-Man, Ho Lan, Sze-Ma Wah-Lung, Yung Yuk-Yi, Chan Wai-Yue, Ko Lo-Chuen, Lai Cheuk-Cheuk, Wong Hak, Lai Man	Romance	
The Flying Killer (aka Chivalrous Girl in the Air)	Mok Hong-See	Connie Chan, Tam Bing-Man, Fong Sam, Sek Kin, Lydia Shum, Pak Ming, Sze-Ma Wah-Lung, Fung Ging-Man, Lok Gung, Chow Wai-Fong, Lau Kar-Leung	Action	
The Flying Red Rose	Luk Bong	Josephine Siao, Wu Fung, Fong Sam, Mak Gei, Seung-Goon Yuk, Ko Lo-Chuen, Aai Dung-Gwa, Lee Sau-Kei, Yeung Yip-Wang	Action	
The Full Moon	Kwan Chi-Kin	Ng Kwun-Lai, Wu Fung, Lam Fung, Cheung Ying-Tsoi, Mak Gei, Kwan Hoi-San, Gam Lui, Yung Yuk-Yi	Drama	
Girl in Red (aka Girl with Red Coat, Girl in Red Dress)	Hoh Gin-Yip	Connie Chan, Chow Chung, Lee Pang-Fei, Sek Kin, Mang Lee, Simon Yuen Siu-Tin, Lai Man, Man Leng, Chu Siu-Boh, Fung Mei-Ying	Crime Action	
The Girl with Long Hair	Chan Wan	Connie Chan, Lam Ka-Sing, Keung Chung-Ping, Helena Law Lan, Lee Pang-Fei, Lee Yuet-Ching, Wong Hon, Ling Fung, Chak Wai, Cheung Ho, Lam Siu, Hak Suen-Fung, Fei Suk-Suk, Woo Ping	Drama	
Golden Skeleton	Wong Fung		Action	
The Golden Cat	Chiang Wai-Kwong	Josephine Siao, Wu Fung, Sek Kin, Sum Chi-Wah, Alice Au Yin-Ching, Cornel Chan Kwan-Nang, Lau Kar-Wing, Lok Gung, Lai Man, Gam Lui, Ko Lo-Chuen, Fung Ming, Go Chiu, Ma Si-Kui	Action	
The Golden Swallow	Chiang Wai-Kwong	Connie Chan, Kenneth Tsang, Sek Kin, Lee Heung-kam, Lam Kau, Lok Gung, Gam Lui, Fung Ging-Man	Action	
Good Wife	Ling Yun, Shek Chee-Bun	Connie Chan, Cheung Ching, Kenneth Tsang Kong, Mui Kwai-Lui, Yung Yuk-Yi, Helena Law Lan, Lai Man, Gam Lau	Comedy	
The Great Lover	Wong Fung	Ko Fung, Nam Hung, Lui Kei, Helena Law Lan, Yung Yuk-Yi	Romance	
Green-Eyed Demon (aka Green-Eyed Demoness, The Green-Eyed Lady, The Witch)	Chan Lit-Ban	Suet Nei, Kenneth Tsang Kong, Tam Sin-Hung, Sek Kin, Ko Lo-Chuen	Martial Arts	
Happy Years	Mok Hong-See	Josephine Siao, Chow Chung, Leung Sing-Bo, Tam Bing-Man, Sai Gwa-Pau, Helena Law Lan, Lydia Shum, Mok Ka-Lun, Woo Ping, Chan Lap-Ban, Lam Siu, Wong Sung-Nin	Romantic Comedy	
Hong Kong Nocturne	Umetsugu Inoue	Peter Chen Ho, Cheng Pei-pei, Lily Ho, Chin Ping, Chiang Kuang-Chao, Ling Yun, Tien Feng, Lui Ming, Yueh Hua, Cheng Kang-Yeh, Tina Chin Fei, Lee Ho, Tien Shun, Ou-Yang Sha-Fei	Musical	
The Horrifying Adventure of a Girl (aka Crime Behind the Curtain)	Chan Wan	Wu Fung, Josephine Siao, Petrina Fung Bo-Bo, Mak Gei, Fei Suk-Suk, Leung Sau-Wah, Wong Oi-Ming, Lee Sau-Kei, Lai Man, Hui Ying-Ying, Chak Wai, Ling Fung, Wong Hon, Hong Sheng-Nv, Lee Yuet-Ching, Tai Sang-Po, Liao Jin-Yan	Cantonese Musical Comedy	
How the Sacred Fire Heroic Winds Defeat the Fire Lotus Array (aka Sacred Fire, Heroic Wind, Part Three)	Siu Sang	Josephine Siao, Connie Chan, Lee Hung, Ng Chin-Fung, Helena Law Lan, Cheng Kwun-Min, Sai Gwa-Pau, Yung Yuk-Yi, Lau Ching	Martial Arts	
I Love A-Go-Go	Chiang Wai-Kwong	Wu Fung, Josephine Siao, Nancy Sit, Adam Cheng, Lee Heung-kam, Lai Man, Yung Yuk-Yi, Hui Ying-Ying, Lee Sin-Pan, Alice Au Yin-Ching, Kong Bo-Lin, Kong Lai, Lee Mei-Ling, Cheung Pooi-Wa	Musical	
The Impartial and Incorruptible Bao Gong (aka The Impartial and Incorruptible Judge Pao)	Ling Yun	Lam Ka-Sing, Ng Kwun-Lai, Liang Tsi-Pak	Cantonese opera, Historical Drama	
The Iron Lady Against the One-eyed Dragon	Ling Yun	Connie Chan, Cheung Ching, Mui Kwai-Lui, Lydia Shum Tin-Ha, Lau Kar-Leung, Chow Gat, Chan Lap-Ban, Tang Ti, Sze-Ma Wah-Lung	Action	
King Drummer	Inoue Umetsugu	Lily Ho Li-Li, Ling Yun, Yang Fang	Musical Drama	
Lady Black Cat Strikes Again	Chiang Wai-Kwong	Connie Chan Po-Chu, Wu Fung, Lee Hung	Action	
Lady Flying Dragon	Cheung Man	Connie Chan Po-Chu, Wu Fung, Ng Kwun-Lai, Sek Kin, Ko Fung, Lai Man, Sze-Ma Wah-Lung	Action	
Lady in Black Cracks the Gate of Hell (aka The Hell's Gate, The Black Musketeer (part 3))	Law Chi	Suet Nei, Kenneth Tsang Kong, Law Oi-Seung	Action	
Lady in Distress: The Invincible Fighter (aka Dragnet of the Law)	Mok Hong-See	Connie Chan Po-Chu, Lui Kei, Tam Bing-Man, Sek Kin, Yue Ming	Action	
Lady in Pink (aka The Lady Information Agent)	Richard Yeung Kuen	Josephine Siao, Wu Fung, Lin Yun, Sek Kin	Musical Action	
The Lady Killer (aka Bat Girl)	Wong Fung	Josephine Siao, Lui Kei, Cheng Kwun-Min, Sek Kin	Action	
Lady with a Cat's Eyes (aka The Cat Eyed Girl)	Law Chi	Connie Chan Po-Chu, Kenneth Tsang Kong, Sek Kin, Mang Lee, Sze-Ma Wah-Lung	Action	
Lau Kam Ding - the Female General	Siu Sang	Josephine Siao, Connie Chan Po-Chu, Liang Tsi-Pak, Mui Kwai-Lui, Lee Fung, Wan Ling-Kwong	Cantonese opera	
Lightning Killer	Chiang Wai-Kwong	Wu Fung, Josephine Siao, Sek Kin, Cheng Kwun-Min, Lok Gung, Lee Sau-Kei, Ding Wai	Action	
The Long Journey Home (aka A Long Journey)	Kwan Chi-Kin	Ng Kwun-Lai, Tang Pik-Wan, Lam Fung, Cheung Ying-Tsoi, Siu Kuk-Hung, Lee Heung-kam	Drama	
Love at First Sight	Lee Tit	Nam Hung, Lui Kei, Keung Chung-Ping	Romance Crime	
Madame Lee Sze-Sze (aka Li Shi-Shi)	Wong Hok-Sing	Lam Ka-Sing, Ng Kwun-Lai, So Siu-Tong, Lee Heung-kam, Cheung Sing-Fei, Simon Yuen Siu-Tin, Ho King-Fan	Cantonese opera	
Madame Slender Plum (aka Madam Slender Plum, Under the Spell of Love)	Lo Wei	Diana Chang Chung-Wen, Jenny Hu Yan-Ni, Paul Chang Chung, Lo Wei, Yip Ching, Yang Chi-Ching, Angela Yu Chien, Tien Feng	Mandarin Mystery Drama	
Maiden Thief (aka The Wonder Thief, The Precious Mirror)	Chor Yuen	Josephine Siao, Lui Kei, Lee Heung-kam, Leung Sing-Bo, Man Leng, Leung Ming	Drama	
Making a Living in a Blind Way	Chan Cheuk-Sang	Sun-Ma Sze-Tsang, Lee Hung, Cheng Kwun-Min, Hung Hung, Yue Ming, Lee Heung-kam	Comedy	
Man from Interpol	Chor Yuen	Patrick Tse, Kong Suet, Patrick Lung, Mak Gei, Man Leng, Yu Mei-Wah, Lee Pang-Fei, Lok Gung	Crime, Gambling	
The Mirror and the Lichee	Kao Li	Ivy Ling Po, Fang Ying, Alison Chang Yen, Li Ying	Historic Drama	
Miss. Mr. Mrs.	Cheung Ying, Ng Wui	Patsy Ka Ling, Cheung Ching	Comedy	
My Darling Wife (aka His Loving Wife)	Chor Yuen	Nam Hung, Wu Fung, Kenneth Tsang Kong, Erica Lee Man, Ling Fung, Yung Siu-Yi, Yung Yuk-Yi	Drama	
My Dreamboat (aka My Dream Boat)	Doe Ching	Lily Ho, Chin Han, Yan Jun	Drama	
One-Armed Swordsman	Chang Cheh	Jimmy Wang, Lisa Chiao Chiao, Tien Feng, Angela Pan	Martial Arts	
Operation Lipstick	Umetsugu Inoue	Cheng Pei-Pei, Paul Chang Chung	Comedy Thriller	
Paragon of Sword and Knife (aka The Sword and Knife)	Chan Lit-Ban	Connie Chan Po-Chu, Suet Nei, Kenneth Tsang Kong	Martial Arts	
The Plot (aka Revenge of the Prince, Teaching the Son to Slay the Emperor)	Wong Hok-Sing		Historical Drama	
Prodigal in Distress (aka The Adventure of an Orphan)	Miu Hong-Nee	Wu Fung, Teresa Ha Ping, Nancy Sit, Petrina Fung Bo-Bo, On Wai-Lin, Ko Lo-Chuen, Mui Yan, Hung Hung, Sai Gwa-Pau, Lai Man, To Sam-Ku, Lok Gung, Lam Tan, Yung Yuk-Yi, Pak Kim-Ping	Drama	
The Professionals	Chan Man	Patrick Tse, Josephine Siao, Yu Mei-Wah, Lee Pang-Fei, Wong Hang, Lau Kar-Leung, Heung Hoi, Tong Kai	Action	
The Purple Shell	Pan Lei	Chiang Feng, Ling Yun (born 1941)	Drama	
Rape of the Sword	Yueh Feng	Li Li-Hua, Li Ching, Chan Hung lit, Kiu Chong, Tien Feng	Wuxia	
Revenger (Story of a Brave Soul)	Chor Yuen	Patrick Tse, Patsy Ka Ling, Lee Ching	Drama	
Rocambole	Daniel Lau Tan-Ching	Josephine Siao, Kenneth Tsang Kong, Lam Kau, Sek Kin, Mang Lee, Fung Ging-Man, Hui Ying-Ying, Little Unicorn, Chow Siu-Loi, Lee Ying	Action	
Romance Across the Miles (aka Silver Moon)	Kwan Chi-Kin	Ng Kwun-Lai, Wu Fung, Cheung Ying-Tsoi, Lam Kau, Mak Gei	Drama	
Romance of a Teenage Girl (aka Young Love, A Young Girl's Love)	Chor Yuen	Nam Hung, Josephine Siao, Kenneth Tsang Kong, Paul Chu Kong, Tong Ching, Lai Man, Lok Gung, Gam Lui, Lau Kar-Wing	Drama	
Seven Princesses (Part 1)	Ling Yun	Connie Chan Po-Chu, Josephine Siao, Nancy Sit Ka-Yin, Wong Oi-Ming, Sum Chi-Wah, Alice Fung So-bor, Petrina Fung Bo-Bo	Martial Arts	
Seven Princesses (Part 2)	Ling Yun	Petrina Fung Bo-Bo, Connie Chan Po-Chu, Josephine Siao	Martial Arts	
The Seven Swords and the Thirteen Heroes (aka Seven Knights and Thirteen Chivalrous Men)	Leung Fung	Yim-hing Law, Walter Tso Tat-Wah, Yam Yin, Sek Kin, Lee Heung-kam, Mui Lan	Martial Arts	
Shaky Steps (aka Every Step of Alarm)	Ngai Hoi-Fung	Wu Fung, Josephine Siao, Sek Kin, Gam Lui	Horror Crime	
She Is Our Senior	Chan Lit-Ban	Connie Chan Po-Chu, Law Oi-Seung, Kenneth Tsang Kong, Sze-Ma Wah-Lung	Action	
She's So Brave (aka The Heroine)	Ling Yun (born 1925)		Action	
The Silent Swordsman	Kao Li	Chang Yi, Yue Wai	Martial Arts	
Sing High, Sing Low	Sit Kwan	Peter Chen Ho, Pat Ting Hung, Margaret Hsing Hui, Chin Feng, Mona Fong, Guan Shan, Diana Chang Chung-Wen, Chiang Kuang-Chao	Musical	
Sister's Lover (aka My Sister's Love)	Lo Yu-Kei, John Law Ma	Nancy Sit, Wan Fong-Ling, Kenneth Tsang Kong, Ma Chiu-Chi, Lai Man, Ma Siu-Ying, Hui Ying-Ying, Chin Han, Alice Au Yin-Ching, Lok Gung, John Law Ma	Romance Drama	
Song of Tomorrow	Doe Ching	Ivy Ling Po, Kiu Chong, Chin Han	Drama	
The Story of a Discharged Prisoner (aka Upright Repenter, Ying xiong ben se, Yingxiong Bense)	Patrick Lung	Patrick Tse, Sek Kin, Mak Gei, Patrick Lung Kong, Patsy Kar, Mang Lee, Ma Siu-Ying, Hui Ying-Ying, Chow Wai-Fong, Chan Lap-Ban	Action	
The Strange Girl (Chinese: 人海奇花)	Wong Yiu	Lui Kei, Patsy Kar, Miu Ka-Lai, Lok Gung, Manor Chan Man-Na, Lam Siu	Drama	
The Strange Hero Yi Zhimei (aka A Strange Daredevil)	Wong Fung	Sun-Ma Sze-Tsang, Teresa Ha Ping, Mang Lee, Tam Lan-Hing	Comedy	
Summons to Death	Lo Wei	Tina Chin Fei, Tang Ching, Fanny Fan Lai, Wang Hsieh, Ku Feng, Huang Chung-Hsin, Lo Wei, Chiang Kuang-Chao, Chai No	Action	
Susanna	Ho Meng Hua	Li Ching, Guan Shan, Alison Chang Yen	Romance Drama	
Sweet Is Revenge	Wu Chia-Hsiang	Yueh Hua, Li Ching, Angela Yu Chien, Ching Miao, Lee Ying	Mandarin Action	
The Sweetest Moment	Wong Yiu	Connie Chan, Lui Kei, Cheung Yee, Yip Ching, Lydia Shum Tin-Ha, Yung Yuk-Yi	Musical	
The Sword and the Lute Chinese: 琴劍恩仇	Hsu Tseng-Hung	Chin Ping, Jimmy Wang Yu, Ivy Ling Po, Yueh Hua, Lo Lieh, Margaret Hsing, Petrina Fung, Pang Pang	Martial Arts	
The Tempestuous Sunset (aka The Warm Affection)	Kao Li, He Fang	Wang Ling, Wu Chia-Chi	Drama	
Tender Tears (aka As Long as I Remember)	Sung Ming, Fung Gam-Faat, Fung Kam-Pui	Ting Ying, Lee Wan-Sheung, Lee Hak, Lai Man, Gam Lau, On Wai-Lin, Lee Sau-Kei	Drama	
Terrors Over Nothing	Chiang Wai-Kwong	Ng Kwun-Lai, Wu Fung, Tam Bing-Man, Lee Heung-kam, Cheng Kwun-Min, Alice Au	Martial Arts	
They All Fall in Love (aka Eternal Love)	Wong Yiu	Nam Hung, Lui Kei, Cheung Yee	Drama	
They Fought Shoulder to Shoulder (aka Magnificent Adventurer)	Ng Wui	Pak Yan, Patrick Tse Yin, Lee Ching	Martial Arts	
The Three Swordsmen	Ling Yun	Connie Chan, Josephine Siao, Tam Sin-Hung, Walter Tso Tat-Wah, Yu So-Chau, Ko Lo-Chuen		
Three Women in a Factory (aka Three Flowers of the Factory)	Sung Ming	Ting Ying, Cheung Yee, Lydia Shum, Lee Chan-Chan, Chan Chun-Wah	Romantic Comedy	
To Rose with Love	Chor Yuen	Cheung Wood-Yau, Nam Hung, Patrick Tse, Stanley Fung, Seung-Goon Yuk, Ting Yan, Lee Pang-Fei	Action	
To Sell, to Pawn and to Borrow (aka Selling, Pawning and Borrowing)	Wong Hok-Sing	Sun-Ma Sze-Tsang, Tang Pik-Wan, Yue Ming	Comedy	
Too Late for Love	Lo Chen	Ivy Ling Po, Guan Shan	Drama, War	
Tragedy in a Fishing Village (aka Adventure in Fishing Harbour)	Chan Lit-Ban	Connie Chan Po-Chu, Kenneth Tsang Kong, Law Oi-Seung, Kong Man-Sing, Teresa Ha Ping, Lam Tin, Ling Mung, Lok Gung, Tang Ti, Chow Gat, Yung Yuk-Yi, Wong Shu-Tong	Drama	
Unforgettable First Love (aka First Love Forever)	Wong Yiu	Lui Kei, Miu Ka-Lai, Hoh Chung, Lydia Shum, Lai Man	Romance	
Uproar in Jade Hall	Wong Hok-Sing	Lam Ka-Sing, Ng Kwun-Lai, Lee Heung-kam, Kwan Hoi-san, Tam Ting-Kwun, Cheung Sang	Cantonese Opera	
Waste Not Our Youth (aka Don't Wait Till It's Too Late)	Ng Tan	Connie Chan, Lui Kei, Tam Bing-Man, Lydia Shum, Lok Gung	Drama	
White Swan	Tu Kuang-Chi	Wu Fung, So Ching, Fanny Fan Lai	Action	
Who Should Be the Commander-in-Chief? (aka Love and War)	Wong Hok-Sing	Lam Ka-Sing, Ng Kwun-Lai, Lee Heung-kam, Kwan Hoi-San, Ho King-Fan, Tam Ting-Kwun, Cheung Sing-Fei, Simon Yuen Siu-Tin, Kwok Ban-Chiu	Cantonese opera	
You Are the One I Love (aka You are My Love)	Chu Kei, Chu Yat-Hung, Ho Hoi-Ki	Josephine Siao, Wu Fung, Pearl Au Ka-Wai, Do Ping	Cantonese Musical	
The Young Daughter-in-Law (aka Little Daughter-in-Law, Melancholy Daughter-in-Law)	Mok Hong-See	Connie Chan Po-Chu, Cheung Ching, Kenneth Tsang Kong	Drama	
The Young Ones (Love Love Love)	Hoh Gin-Yip	Patrick Tse Yin, Josephine Siao Fong-Fong, Chan Tsai-Chung	Comedy	
