= List of Hong Kong films of 1970 =

A list of films produced in Hong Kong in 1970:

== 1970 ==
Title	Director	Cast	Genre	Notes
1970
A Cause to Kill	Shut Git Muk	Ivy Ling Po, Kwan Shan, Lisa Chiao Chiao, Wong Chung Shun, Lee Sau Kei	Thriller	Shaw Brothers
Adventure in Paradise	Chen Jingbo	Henry Fong, Ming Jiang, Shek Lui, Hua Xiang	Adventure	
Apartment for Ladies	Umetsugu Inoue	Betty Ting, Yang Fang, Lily Li, Teresa Ha, Ouyang Sha-fei, Alice Au Yin Ching, Guo Man-Na, Lee Pang-Fei, Wei Tzu-Yun, Ding Sai, Chow Ka-Lai, Erh Chun	Comedy	Shaw Brothers
A Place to Call Home	Wu Jiaxiang	Barry Chan, Yi Ling Chan, Yu Fang, Margaret Hsing Hui, Kao Pao-shu, Ching Lee, Hsiao Chung Li	Drama	Shaw Brothers
The Arch	Tang Shu Shuen		Drama	
A Taste of Cold Steel (aka The Purple Sword)	Feng Yueh	Pei-pei Shu, Yi Chang, Essie Lin Chia, Chan Hung Lit, Hsieh Wang	Thriller	Shaw Brothers
A Time for Love	Chih-Hung Kwei	Lily Ho, Kwan-Min Cheng, Shirley Huang, Kwan Lee, Ai Lien Pan	Comedy	Shaw Brothers
The Bravest Revenge	Lung Chien		Martial arts	Likely a Taiwanese film
Brothers Five	Lo Wei	Cheng Pei-pei, Lo Lieh	Action thriller	Shaw Brothers
The Chinese Boxer (aka The Hammer of God)	Jimmy Wang Yu	Jimmy Wang Yu	Martial arts	Shaw Brothers
Cold Blade	Chor Yuen	Melinda Chen Man-Ling, Kao Yuen, Ingrid Hu Yin-Yin, Cheung Ban, Paul Chu Kong, Tsung Yu, Kong San, Li Ying, Lau Kong, Lee Man-Tai, Kuan-tai Chen, Tung Choi-Bo, Chow Siu-Loi, Yeung Wai, Wong Kin-Wah, Cheng Mei-Mei, Lau Wai-Man	Mandarin martial arts	Cathay
Dial for Murder	Chor Yuen		Crime	Cathay
Double Bliss	Chun Kim		Comedy	Shaw Brothers
Filial Girl at the Icy Valley (aka Ice Valley Witch)	Joe Law		Martial arts	
From the Highway	Tseng-Chai Chang		Martial arts	Cathay
The Golden Eves	Chiang Wai-Kwong	Shirley Wong Sa-Lee, Ping Ping	Drama	
The Golden Knight	Yueh Feng		Martial arts	
The Heart-Stealer	Lui Kei	Lui Kei, So Ching, Nancy Sit, Cheung Ying-Tsoi, Wong Wai, Pearl Au Ka-Wai, Manor Chan Man-Na, Wong Oi-Ming, Kong Lai, Fong Sam, Lai Man, Yuk-Yi Yung	Drama	
The Heroic Ones	Chang Cheh		Martial arts	Shaw Brothers
The Homemaker	Lau Fong Gong		Drama	
The Hut on the Hilltop	Hu Xiaofeng		Drama	Great Wall
I'll Get You One Day (aka One Day I Will Get You)	Chan Lit-Ban	Connie Chan, Nancy Sit, Kenneth Tsang Kong, Cheung Ching, Stanley Fung Sui-Fan, Yue Ming	Crime	
I Don’t Want a Divorce	Chor Yuen		Drama	
The Iron Buddha	Yan Jun		Martial arts	
The Jugglers	Choi Cheong	Pak Yan, Ting Leung, Lee Ching, Lui Sek Kwai, Chan Chung Kin, Kong To, Cheng Chee Liang, Heung Wa, Luk Yan, Lo Dun, and Chu Ming Ming	Martial arts	Flying Dragon
Lady of Steel	Ho Meng-Hua	Cheng Pei-Pei, Yueh Hua	Mandarin martial arts	
The Lonely Rider (aka The Gallant Boy)	Fung Fung	Petrina Fung Bo-Bo, Nancy Sit, Kenneth Tsang, Sek Kin, Sum Chi-Wah, Fung Fung, Wong Oi-Ming, Luk Fei-Hung, Kwan Hoi-San, Lam Tin, Fung Hak-On, Ng Yan-Chi, Siu Chung-Kwan, Siu Hon-Sang, Yuen Lap-Cheung, Chu Yau-Ko, Fung Ging-Man	Drama	
The Lost Spring	Chor Yuen		Drama	
Love Without End	Pan Lei		Drama	Shaw Brothers
The Mad Bar	Ng Tan	Petrina Fung Bo-Bo, Alan Tang Kwong-Wing, Wong Oi-Ming, Lydia Shum, Chan Leung-Chung	Drama	
The Magnificent Gunfighter (aka Magnificent Gunfighters, Gallant Gunfighter)	Evan Yang	Chao Lei, Maggie Li Lin-Lin, Steve Chan Ho, Tin Ching	Mandarin bullet ballet	
Modern School Life	Chan Wan		Drama	
The Price of Love	Wu Chia-hsiang	Teddy Robin, Chin Ping	Drama	Shaw Brothers
Secret Agent No. 1	Walter Tso Tat-Wah	Walter Tso, Connie Chan, Kwan Tak-Hing, Nancy Sit, Suet Nei, Tina Ti Na, Lydia Shum, Yu So-Chau, So Ching, Lee Heung-kam, Cheng Kwun-Min, Helena Law, Seung-Goon Yuk, Kong Dan, Fong Wah, Lau Ching, Lok Gung, Mui Yan, Yue Ming, Chan Ho-Kau, To Sam-Ku	Crime	
The Secret of the Dirk	Hsu Tseng-Hung		Martial arts	
The Singing Killer	Chang Cheh		Action, crime	
Three Desperados (aka The Desperados, Three Desperadoes)	Chan Lit-Ban	Connie Chan, Nancy Sit, Chan Ho-Kau, Tam Sin-Hung	Action	
To Crack the Dragon Gate	Fung Chi Kong, Ng Wui		Martial arts	
The Twelve Gold Medallions	Gang Cheng		Martial arts	Shaw Brothers
The Wandering Swordsman	Cheh Chang	David Chiang	Sword	Shaw Brothers
Vengeance	Chang Cheh	David Chang, Ti Lung	Martial arts	
Violet Clove and Firebird (aka Violet Clove & Fire-Bird)	Chor Yuen	Melinda Chen Man-Ling, Paul Chang Chung, Chu Mu, Mang Lee, Li Ying, Sun Tao	Mandarin drama	
The Winged Tiger	San Kong	Chan Hung Lit, Angela Yu, Tien Feng, Paul Wei Ping-Ao, David Chiang	Action / adventure / martial arts	Shaw Brothers
Wrath of the Sword	Wu Ma		Wuxia	
Yesterday, Today, Tomorrow	Patrick Lung	Paul Chang Chung, Nancy Sit, Helena Law Lan, Wu Fung, Patrick Lung, Fung Fung, Pat Ting Hung, Lee Wan-Chung, Tina Ti Na, Yuk-Yi Yung, Lai Man, Ying-Ying Hui, Ting Yim	Drama	
The Young Girl Dares Not Homeward (aka Girl Wanders Around)	Richard Yeung Kuen	Connie Chan, Nancy Sit, Kenneth Tsang, Wu Fung, Walter Tso, Lee Heung-kam, Seung-Goon Yuk, Ko Lo-Chuen, Yuk-Yi Yung, Sze-Ma Wah-Lung, Lok Gung, Wong Hak, Gam Lau	Drama	
