= List of Hong Kong films of 1965 =

A list of films produced in Hong Kong in 1965:

== 1965 ==
| Title | Director | Cast | Genre | Notes |
|---|---|---|---|---|
1965
| A Wife's Diary (aka Diary of a Wife) | Yeung Kung-Leung | | Comedy | |
| Inside The Forbidden City | | | Opera musical | |
| Adventures Of A Woman In A War | Leung Sum | Pak Ming, Lai Man, Cheung Chui-Luen | Adventure, War | |
| The Adventures Of Nazha | Hong Ngai, Siu Sang | | | |
| Agent 101 | Wong Hok Sing | | | |
| Agent Black Spider | Ng Wui | | | |
| All Packed In A Small House | Wong Hok Sing | | | |
| The All-Powerful Flute (Part 1) | Wong Hok Sing | | | |
| The All-Powerful Flute (Part 2) | Wong Hok Sing | | | |
| The Aunt Ping (Part 1) | | | | |
| The Aunt Ping (Part 1) | | | | |
| Back Together | Ling Yun | | | |
| Beautiful Queen of Hell (part 1) | Siu Sang | | | |
| Beautiful Queen of Hell (part 2) | Siu Sang | | | |
| The Black Rose | Chor Yuen | Patrick Tse Yin, Nam Hung, Connie Chan Po-Chu | Action | |
| Dim-sum Queen (aka Queen of Tea House) (Chinese: 點心皇后) | Mok Hong-see | Ying Ting, Cheung Ying-Tsoi, Lap-Ban Chan | Comedy | |
| Doomed Love (aka A Love's Tragedy) (Chinese: 情天劫) | Chor Yuen | Ying Ting, Paul Chu Kong, Lee Ching, Man-lei Wong, Gam Lau | Drama | |
| The Girl in the Bus | Mok Hong-See | Pak Yan, Kong Hon, Lo Duen, Ma Siu-Ying, Tang Mei-Mei | Comedy | |
| The Six-fingered Lord of the Lute (Part 1) | Chan Lit-Ban | Kong Man-Sing, Connie Chan Po-Chu, Lee Kui-On, Yung Yuk-Yi, Pak Yin | Martial Arts | |
| Song Fest | Yuan Qiu-Feng | Margaret Tu Chuan, Kiu Chong, Julie Shih Yen, Ko Hsiao-Pao, Lisa Chiao Chiao, Lily Ho, Ng Wai | Chinese opera | Mandarin. |
