= List of Hong Kong films of 1961 =

A list of films produced in Hong Kong in 1961:

== 1961 ==
| Title | Director | Cast | Genre | Notes |
|---|---|---|---|---|
1961
| All the Best | Doe Ching | | | |
| The Attack Of The 5 Fairies Monastery | Wong Fung | | | |
| Beauty Parade | Tong Wong | | | |
| Beggar King Saves The Prince | Fung Fung | | | |
| Les Belles | Doe Ching | | | |
| The Belt | Yeung Kong | | | |
| Bloody Gloves | | | | |
| The Breakthrough | Wu Pang | | | |
| The Bridge (Part 1) | | | | |
| The Bridge (Part 2) | | | | |
| Chase | Chow See Luk | | | |
| China At Dawn | Wu Pang | | | |
| The Cliff | Chung Yau | | | |
| Combat Between Seven Swords And Five Dragons | Wu Pa | | | |
| Dreams for the Past Events (aka Ten Years Dream) | Fung Fung | Mak Bing-Wing, Wong-Nui Fung, Lam Ka-Sing, Tam Lan-Hing, Chan Ho-Kau | Drama. Cantonese opera. | |
| Education of Love | Chung Kai Man | Sammo Hung, Jeanette Lin | | |
| The Greatest Civil War on Earth | Wong Tin-Lam | Christine Pai, Kelly Lai Chen, Kitty Ting Hao, Lai Man, Baby Wong Pui-Pui | Comedy | |
| How to Get a Wife | Chun Kim | Patrick Tse, Patsy Kar | Comedy | |
| Long Live the Money | Ng Wui | Cheung Wood-Yau, Tsi Law-Lin, Lee Ching, Man-lei Wong, Yung Siu-Yi | Comedy | |
| Love Without End | Doe Ching | | | |
| Secret Book (Part 1) (aka The Magic Crane) | Miu Hong-Nee | Tang Bik-wan, Yu So-chow, Lam Ka-Sing, Lam Kau, Lok Gung, Yeung Yip-Wang, Chan Ho-Kau, Chan Wai-Yue | Martial Arts | |
| Secret Book (Part 2) (aka The Magic Crane) | Miu Hong-Nee | Lam Ka-Sing, Yu So-chow, Tang Bik-wan, Lam Kau, Lok Gung, Yeung Yip-Wang, Chan Ho-Kau, Chan Wai-Yue, Lai Man, Chow Gat, Fung Ging-Man, Chan Lap-Ban | Martial Arts | |
| Seven Phoenixes (aka Golden Phoenix vs. the Dragon) | Wong Hok-Sing | Yam Kim-Fai, Yu Lai-Zhen, Leung Sing-Bo, Poon Yat-On, Liang Tsi-Pak, Yam Bing-Yee | Cantonese opera | |
| Song of the Nightingale | Wong Toi | Christine Pai Lu-Ming, Wu Fung, Petrina Fung Bo-Bo, Lee Heung-Kam, Lau Hak-Suen, Cheng Kwun-Min, Lee Pang-Fei, Ma Siu-Ying, Lai Man, Lok Gung, Chan Lit-Ban | Drama | |
| Sorrowful Orphans | Fung Fung | Ying Ting, Fung Bo Bo, Paul Chu Kong, Keung Chung-Ping, Chan Wai-Yue, Lee Heung-kam, To Sam-Ku, Leung Kar-Bo | Drama | |
| Sun, Moon and Star (Part 1, Part 2) | Evan Yang | | | |
| Woman's Affairs | Mok Hong-See | Ying Ting, Lam Ka-Sing, Carrie Ku Mei, Paul Chu Kong, Man Oi-Lan, Au-Yeung Kim, Tam Lan-Hing, Cheng Kwun-Min, Cheung Yee | Comedy | |
