= List of Hong Kong films of 1966 =

A list of films produced in Hong Kong in 1966:

== 1966 ==
Title	Director	Cast	Genre	Notes
1966
Affection	Chu Yuan			
Aftermath of a Fire (Part 1)	Ling Yun			
Aftermath of a Fire (Part 2)	Ling Yun			
Ah Chun Wants to Get Marry (a.k.a. Landlady & Tenant)	Mok Hong See		Romantic Comedy	
An Avenger's Tale (Part 1)	Wong Fung			
An Avenger's Tale (Part 2)	Wong Fung			
Back-Up Bride				
Banner of the Twin Phoenixes (Part 1)	Ling Yun			
Banner of the Twin Phoenixes (Part 2)	Ling Yun			
The Big Chase	Joe Law Chi			
Bitter Fear	Choi Cheong			
Come Drink with Me	King Hu	Cheng Pei-pei, Yueh Hua, Chan Hung Lit, Lee Wan-Chung, Yang Chi-Ching, Shum Lo	Wuxia	
Double Exposure (aka A Girl of Deceiver)	Tu Kuang-Chi	Ting Ying, Paul Chu Kong, Helena Law Lan, Lai Man, Yue Ming	Thriller	
The Flying Killer (aka The Female Chivalry)	Chien Lung	Yu So-Chau, Ulysses Au-Yeung Jun, Tsi Law-lin, Kao Min-Ling, Ting Hsiang, Irene Ryder	Fantasy Action Science Fiction	
Girl Detective 001 (aka Detective Girl 001)	Lung To	Connie Chan Po-Chu, Lui Kei	Crime	
Girls Are Flowers (aka Girl at Eighteen)	Wong Yiu	Connie Chan, Lui Kei, Nancy Sit, Ma Siu-Ying, Yip Ching, Lai Man, Yung Yuk-Yi, Hung Ling-Ling	Musical Romance	
The Golden Bats	Chiang Wai-Kwong		Martial Arts	
How Much Worry You Can Have	Chor Yuen	Kong Hon, Pak Yan, Fung Chan	Drama	
The International Secret Agents (aka International Secret Agent, SOS Hong Kong) (Chinese: 國際女間諜)	Choi Gyeong-Ok	Ying Ting, Park Nou-Sik, Helen Li	Thriller	
The Knight of Knights	Sit Kwan	Kiu Chong, Lily Ho, Li Ying, Liu Liang-Hua, Lily Li Li-Li	Martial Arts	
Lady Bond (Chivalrous Girl)	Mok Hong-See	Connie Chan, Nam Hung, Chow Chung, Tam Bing-Man, Cheng Man-Ha, Chan Lap-Ban, Chui Yi	Action	
The Lady Spy (aka The Female King Kong)	Chien Lung	Yu So-Chau, Ulysses Au-Yeung Jun, Ting Feng, Mak Gei, Ting Hsiang, Ying Ying	Action	
Love Burst	Mok Hong-See	Ying Ting, Tam Bing-Man, Lai Siu-Fong, Man-lei Wong, Ma Kam-Neong	Drama	
Madam Mystery	Lee Ying-Yuen	Ting Ying, Paul Chu Kong, Tam Lan-Hing, Helena Lawm Lan, Lai Man, Wong Lai-Ming	Drama	
Monkey Goes West				
Mr. Know How (aka Jack-of-All-Trades)	Ng Tan	Lui Kei, Kitty Ting Hao, Erica Lee Man, Lee Kui-On, Sze-Ma Wah-Lung, Ko Lo-Chuen, Ma Siu-Ying, Aai Dung-Gwa, Lok Gung, Lee Heung-Kam	Comedy	
Night of the Opera Stars (aka Goddess of Mercy Celebrates Her Birthday at Xiang Shan)	Wong Hok-Sing	Sek Yin-Tsi, Yam Kim-fai, Pak Suet-Sin, Yu Kai, Ng Kwun-Lai, Fung Wong-Nui, Lam Ka-Sing, Connie Chan Po-Chu, Chan Kam-Tong, Leung Sing-Bo, Pak Lung-Chu, Law Kim-Long, Tam Lan-Hing, Little Unicorn, Hui Ying-Sau, Hong Sheng-Nv, Lee Bo-Ying, Yuen Siu-Fai, Chan Ho-Kau, So Siu-Tong, Wong Chin-Sui	Documentary	
Princess Iron Fan	Ho Meng Hua	Pat Ting Hung, Ho Fan, Yueh Hua	Fantasy	
Spy with My Face	Chor Yuen	Nam Hung, Patrick Tse, Connie Chan, Cheung Wood-Yau, Fung Ngai, Lok Gung, Lai Man, Leung Ming, Cheung Chi-Suen, Unicorn Chan, Leung Siu-Chung, Fung Mei-Ying, Wong Hon, Nam Fung, Man Leng, Ho Pak-Kwong, Fung Ming, Chor Yuen, Hoh Wan, Chow Siu-Loi, Woo Ping, Simon Chui Yee-Ngau	Action	Sequel to The Black Rose.
Who Is More Beautiful? (aka Love with Boat Girl)	Chiang Wai-Kwong	Tang Bik-wan, Lam Fung, Wu Fung, Tam Lan-Hing	Comedy	
