= List of Hong Kong films of 1952 =

A list of films produced in Hong Kong in 1952:

== 1952 ==
Title	Director	Cast	Genre	Notes
1952
A Bright Future (aka Jin xiu qian cheng)	Chun Kim	Sun-Ma Sze-Tsang, Tsi Law-Lin, Siu Yin-Fei, Lee Hoi-Chuen, Hui Ying-Ying	Comedy, Cantonese opera	
A Prayer for Happiness (aka Ru yi ji xiang)				
Between Her Own and the Concubine's Children (aka Di shu zhi jian nan wei mu)				
Blossoms in the Heart (aka Bai hua qi fang)				
Comet of Laughter Lands on Earth				
Father Marries Again (aka Yi jia chun)				
Flower Girl	Yeung Kung-Leung	Hung Sin Nui, Leung Sing-Bo, Yee Chau-Sui, Leung Suk-Hing, Yu Wai-Fun, Tong Chau-Ping	Comedy	
Frolicking with a Pretty Maid in the Wineshop	Chan Pei	Yam Kim-fai, Pak Suet-Sin, Yam Bing-yee	Historical Drama, Comedy, Cantonese opera	
Girl in Red (Chinese: 一丈紅)	Lee Tit	Hung Sin Nui, Cheung Ying, Chow Kwun-Ling, Mui Chun, Nam Hung	Drama	
He Returns by the Lonely Moon (aka Leng yue ban lang gui)	Ng Wui	Pak Yin, Cheung Wood-Yau, Yung Siu-Yi, Lee Yuet-Ching	Drama	
Lonely Moon on a Lonely Bed (aka Yi wan mei yue ban han qin)				
Night of Romance	Yeung Kung-Leung	Sun-Ma Sze-Tsang, Hung Sin-Nui, Cheung Wood-Yau, Chow Kwun-Ling, Yu Kai, Lam Kar-Yee, Lam Siu, Gam Lau, Wong Cho-San, Lee Yuet-Ching, Leung Siu-Mui, Cheung Sang, Lam Yuk, Lam Wah	Comedy	
Hua hao yue yuan Love's Bliss				
Poor Daddy (aka Nan wei le ba ba)				
The Prodigal Son (aka Bai jia zai)	Ng Wui	Cheung Ying, Wong Man-lei, Pak Yin, Yung Siu-yi, Lee Yuet-ching, Leung Suk-Hing	Drama	Sun Luen Film Company's inaugural film.
Red Rose, the Songstress (aka Songstress Red Rose)	Chun Kim	Hung Sin Nui, Cheung Ying, Siu Yin-Fei, Wong Cho-San, Yan Yan, Nam Hung	Drama	Produced by Wa Lai.
The Stormy Night (aka The Roar of the Earth)	Griffin Yueh Feng	Yan Jun, Chen Juan-Juan, Sun Tse-Chun, Luo Lan, Niu Ben, Cen Fan, Soo Chin		
The Story of Emperor Guangxu	Chu Kei	Sun-Ma Sze-Tsang, Cheng Pik-Ying, Tam Lan-Hing, Lau Hak-Suen	Drama	
Sweet Girl and Good Car (aka Beautiful Woman, Beautiful Car)	Chiu Shu-San	Ng Cho-Fan, Pak Wan, Tsi Law-Lin, Lai Yee, Yee Chau-Sui, To Sam-Ku, Chan Lap-Ban, Leung Yeuk-Ngoi, Chao Fei-Fei, Cheng Kwun-Min, Yu Wai-Fun, Lai Ming, Lui Ming, Hui Yee-Wan, Gam Lau	Comedy	
Sweet Girl's Fancies (aka Yu nu fan xin)				
The Twelve Beauties (Chinese: 歌唱十二釵) (aka Twelve Singing Beauties)	Chan Pei	Yam Kim-fai, Pak Suet-Sin, Leung Sing-Bo, Fung Wong-Nui, Lee Ngan, Chan Chui-Bing, Tsang Nam-Sze, Ying Lai-Lei, Mui Chun, Man Lan, Lam Kar-Yee, Mok Wan-Ha, Chan Lo-Wah, Ha Wa	Cantonese opera	
The World Turned Upside Down (aka Tian fan di fu)				
Zi mei hua Sisters Two				
Long feng hua zhu Wedding Candles				
Luan feng he ming The Satisfactory Wedding				
Xin hong lou meng Modern Red Chamber Dream				
Pin jian fu qi bai shi shuai Everything Goes Wrong for Poor Couple				
Fang Shiyu rou bo Hong Xiguan; Fist Battle Between Fong Sze Yu and Hung Sze Kuan				
Shi li chuan gu A Respectable Family				
Chang hen ge A Song of Everlasting Sorrow				
Wu shan meng hui A Lingering Dream				
Yue er wan wan zhao jiu zhou The Moon-blanch'd Land				
Guai mian hu da nao ku lou dong How Queer-faced Tiger Raided the Cave of the Skulls				
Shi lai yun dao Timely Fortune				
Xiao Mingxing zhuan The Life of Xiaomingxing				
Fang mao zi A Bachelor Is Born				
Hua kai yan zi gui The Swallow's Return				
Zhu ying zhao hun fu Return of the Soul				
Gu ling jing guai Funny Fellows				
Bai she zhuan The Legend of Madame White Snake				
Xue jian jin sha wan Bloody Fight by the Golden Sand Beach				
Niang re Nonya				
Jin shui lou tai The Closer the Better				
Er nu qing chang Sweet Love Lingers On				
Shi ge fei nu jia shou lang Ten Fat Brides for Skinny				
Ge chang hu bu gui Why Not Return?: The Musical				
Qi xia hei xuan feng An Extraordinary Hero, Black Swirling Wind				
Nu xia yi zhang hong Heroine in Red				
Nie yuan Fatal Attraction				
Shi zai fan hua yi meng xiao Wealth Gone Like a Dream				
Fu ren xin Woman's Heart				
Huang jin mei ren The Gold and the Beauty				
Liang ge diao man nu san xi Xiao Yuebai; How Two Naughty Girls Thrice Insulted Xiao Yuebai				
Jiang hu er nu Sons of the Earth				
Kuang feng zhi ye The Stormy Night				
Red and White Peonies (aka Hong bai mudan hua)	Yeung Kung-Leung	Hung Sin Nui, Pak Suet-Sin, Lam Kar-Yee	Drama	
Xiang che mei ren Sweet Girl and Good Car				
A Niu xin zhuan A New Story of Aniu				
Xin gu sao jie Sisters-in-Law in Danger				
Feng men xiao feng Daughter of a Humble House				
Portrait of a Lady (Shi nu tu)				
Wang Kui yu Gui Ying; The Troubled Love of Wang Kui and Gui Ying				
Yi dui yan zhi ma Two Naughty Girls				
Ge sheng lei ying A Melancholy Melody				
Ge sheng lei ying xia ji A Melancholy Melody Part 2				
Man yuan chun se Sweet Memories				
Macao				
Yi ban zhi ge The Dividing Wall				
Mi yue Honeymoon				
