= The Cave of the Silken Web =

The Cave of the Silken Web or Pan Si Dong may refer to the following films:

- The Cave of the Silken Web (1927 film)
- The Cave of the Silken Web (1967 film)
