= Kar-Sing Lam =

Chinese actor and Cantonese opera singer from Hong Kong

- Chinese: 林家聲
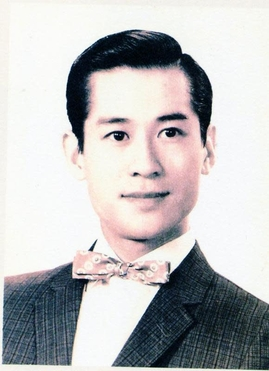
- Lam in the 1960s
- Born: Lam Man Shun; January 18, 1933; Hong Kong
- Died: August 4, 2015 (aged 82); Hong Kong
- Other names: Lam Ka-Sing, Lam Ga-Sing, Lin Ka-Sing, Sing Gor
- Occupations: Actor; Cantonese opera singer
- Years active: 1947–1994
- Spouse: Hong Dou-zi
- Children: 2
- Relatives: Kar-Yee Lam (sister)

Kar-Sing Lam (Chinese: 林家聲) was a former actor and Cantonese opera singer from Hong Kong. Lam is credited with over 300 films.

== Early life ==
On January 18, 1933, Lam was born as Lam Man Shun in Hong Kong. Lam's ancestry origin was from Dongguan, Guangdong province, China. Lam's sister is Lam Kar-Yee. In 1936, Lam's mother died. Lam and his sister were raised up by their father. When Hong Kong was under Japanese occupation, Lam's family fled from Hong Kong to Guangzhou, China, and returned to Hong Kong later. At the age of 10, Lam became a student under Tang Chiu Lan-fong.

== Career ==
In 1944, at age 11, Lam began his Cantonese opera career. In 1947 at age 14, Lam's acting career started. Lam first appeared in Prostituting to Raise the Orphan, a 1947 Cantonese opera film directed by Hung Chung-Ho. In 1966, Lam founded Tsung Sun Sing Troupe in performing Cantonese opera on stage.

Lam's last film was Madame Lee Sze-Sze (a.k.a. Li Shi-Shi), a 1967 Cantonese opera film directed by Wong Hok-Sing. Lam is credited with over 300 films.

In Cantonese opera, Lam's singing is known as Sing style.

== Repertoire ==
This is a partial list.

1. The Marriage of the Top Scholar
2. The Dream Encounter Between Emperor Wu of Han and Lady Wa
3. Time To Go Home, a (Sit Gok Sin Chinese: 薛覺先, Lam's master) classic
4. The Butterfly Lovers (two versions)
5. Lu Wen-long
6. Bao and Dai of Red Chamber
7. War and Never-ending Love
8. Romance and Hatred
9. Merciless Sword Under Merciful Heaven (a.k.a. Paragons and Heroism)
10. The Sounds of Battle
11. The Story of Chu Pin's Loyalty to the Sung Dynasty
12. Uproar in Jade Hall
13. A Chronicle Written in Blood
14. Lam Chung (a.k.a. Lin Chong)
15. The Jade Disc
16. Wu Song
17. Zhou Yu
18. Who Should Be the Commander-in-Chief?

== Theater Performance ==
This is a partial list.

- Passing of Sit Kok Sin in 1956

- Time To Go Home
- The Marriage of the Top Scholar
- The Dream Encounter Between Emperor Wu of Han and Lady Wa

- July 1957 with Yim-hing Law

- Lady White Snake
- Queen of the Stage (a.k.a. Marriage Is a Life-Long Business)

- 1967, United States with Ho-Kau Chan
- 1971, United States

- Invitation originated from 1967 for Kwun-Lai Ng and her Lai Sing Opera Troupe but Ng could not get the necessary documents to perform in the United States that year.

- 1976, 1st Festival of Asian Arts
- 1976, United States
- 1977, 2nd Festival of Asian Arts

- Lu Wen-long
- Bao and Dai of Red Chamber

- 1978, 6th Hong Kong Arts Festival

- Butterfly Lovers
- War and Never-ending Love by playwright Poon Cheuk

- 1978, 3rd Festival of Asian Arts
- 1980, 5th Festival of Asian Arts
- 1981, Singapore (17 titles for 2 weeks, hopefully 3 weeks, repeated four titles for more days, extended to 22 January 1981)

- Lam Kar Sing Cantonese Opera Troupe was brought to the Kreta Ayer People's Theatre by IME United instead of the Kreta Ayer People's Theatre like other troupes such as the one in 1974 led by Madam Choo Sow Ying (Chinese: 朱秀英), to help funds drive.
- Proceeds of the first night was donated by Lam's troupe to the People's Theatre Foundation. (Guangdong Cantonese Opera Troupe grossed $150,000 in 1980.)

- 1981, North America

- Invitation was from Chee Kung Tong (a.k.a. Gee Kung Tong) of Hongmen

- 1982, 7th Festival of Asian Arts
- 1984, Chinese Opera Fortnight

- Time To Go Home, a (Sit Gok Sin, Lam's master) classic
- The Sounds of Battle (a.k.a. The Battling Sounds, 1963 film version)
- Romance and Hatred
- Merciless Sword Under Merciful Heaven (a.k.a. The Pitiless Sword, 1964 film version)

== Filmography ==
=== Films ===
This is a partial list of films.

- 1947 Prostituting to Raise the Orphan
- 1955 Parents' Hearts
- 1960 Three Females - Ho Chi-Hung.
- 1962 Battle at Sizhou
- 1963 The Battling Sounds
- 1964 The Pitiless Sword
- 1967 Uproar in Jade Hall - Cheung Kim-Chau.
- 1967 Madame Lee Sze-Sze (a.k.a. Li Shi-Shi)

== Discography ==
This is a partial list.

- 1968, Of Love and Enmity
- 1969, Why Not Return? (2xLP, Gat)
- 1969, Lam Chung
- 1970, Drums Along the Battlefield (LP, Album)
- 1971, The Revenge Battle
- Meeting at the Pavilion (a.k.a. Butterfly Lovers)
- The Story of Chu Pin's Loyalty to the Sung Dynasty

== Awards ==
- 2006 Star. Avenue of Stars. Tsim Sha Tsui waterfront in Hong Kong.
- 2010 Honorary Doctorates. Presented by the Hong Kong Academy for Performing Arts.
- 2012 Silver Bauhinia Star.

== Personal life ==
In 1962, Lam married Hong Dou-zi (d. 2009), a Cantonese opera singer. They have two sons. In 1993, Lam and his family moved from Hong Kong to Toronto, Canada. In 2003, Lam's younger son committed suicide in Hong Kong. In 2009, after Lam's wife's death from cancer in Toronto, Canada, he returned to Hong Kong.

Lam suffered from Parkinson's disease. Lam resided in Kowloon Tong area, Hong Kong. On August 4, 2015, Lam died in Kwong Wah Hospital in Yau Ma Tei area, Kowloon, Hong Kong. Lam was 82 years old.

== See also ==
- Kwun-Lai Ng
- Bo-Ying Lee
- Ho-Kau Chan
