= Bei Di =

Bei Di may refer to:

- Beidi, "Northern Barbarians" who lived in northern China during the Zhou Dynasty
- Pak Tai, the "Northern Emperor" celebrated in some Chinese cultures
- Betty Pei Ti (born 1951), Taiwanese actress
