= The Stormy Night =

The Stormy Night or Stormy Night may refer to:

- The Stormy Night (風雨之夜), a 1925 Chinese film
- Stormy Night (2003 film), a 2003 Canadian animated short film
- Stormy Night (あらしのよるに), a 2005 Japanese film
- The Stormy Night (狂風之夜), a 1952 Hong Kong film
- The Stormy Night (雨夜惊魂), a 2015 Chinese film
