= Adventures in Paradise =

Adventures in Paradise may refer to:

- Adventures in Paradise (TV series)
- "Adventures in Paradise", aka "Theme from Adventures in Paradise", composed by Lionel Newman, recorded by many inc. Arthur Lyman, Santo & Johnny, Rob E. G., and (words by Dorcas Cochran) Bing Crosby
- Adventures in Paradise, EP by Robie Porter, credited as "Rob E. G."; title track also released on single, B-side of "Tim-buc-too"
- "Adventures in Paradise" (Frasier), two-part episode
- Adventures in Paradise (Minnie Riperton album)
  - "Adventures in Paradise" (Minnie Riperton song), song from Adventures in Paradise
- Adventures in Paradise (Christopher Williams album)
- "Adventures in Paradise", song by Ace of Base on Flowers (Ace of Base album) and Cruel Summer (Ace of Base album)
- "Adventures in Paradise", score heard in Pokémon: The First Movie

== See also ==
- Adventure in Paradise, Hong Kong film
