= The Human Goddess =

1972 Hong Kong film by Ho Meng Hua

- Film poster
- Directed by: Ho Meng Hua
- Written by: Ho Meng Hua
- Produced by: Runme Shaw
- Starring: Lee Ching; Chin Feng; Paang Paang; Dean Shek; Christine Pai
- Cinematography: Tsao Hui-Chi
- Edited by: Chiang Hsing-Lung
- Music by: Frankie Chan; Hsu Yi
- Production company: Shaw Brothers Studio
- Release date: March 10, 1972 (Hong Kong)
- Running time: 99 minutes
- Country: Hong Kong
- Language: Mandarin

The Human Goddess (Chinese: 仙女下凡; pinyin: Sin Lui Ha Fan) is a 1972 Hong Kong fantasy film comedy directed by Ho Meng Hua.

== Plot ==
Seventh sister comes down from heaven to Hong Kong to see the mortal world.

== Cast ==
- Lee Ching
- Chin Feng
- Paang Paang
- Dean Shek
- Christine Pai
- Baak Liu
- Chiu Hung
- Lee Pang Fei
- Suen Lam
- Hoh Ban
- Wu Wei
