= Intimate Confessions of a Chinese Courtesan =

1972 Hong Kong film by Chor Yuen

- Film poster
- Chinese: 愛奴
- Directed by: Chor Yuen
- Screenplay by: Chiu Kang-chien
- Produced by: Runme Shaw
- Starring: Lily Ho; Betty Pei Ti; Yueh Hua
- Cinematography: John Chu
- Edited by: Hsing-lung Chiang; Yen Hai Li
- Music by: Chou Fu-liang
- Production company: Shaw Brothers
- Release date: 9 July 1972 (Hong Kong)
- Running time: 91 minutes
- Country: Hong Kong
- Language: Cantonese

Intimate Confessions of a Chinese Courtesan (Chinese: 愛奴; pinyin: Ai Nu) is a 1972 Hong Kong film directed by Chor Yuen, produced by the Shaw Brothers, and starring Lily Ho. The story follows a young girl kidnapped and sold into prostitution who becomes the primary focus of a police chief's investigation when a series of murders occur at the brothel where she works.

== Plot ==
Ainu, an unsuspecting young girl, is abducted and sold to the popular Four Seasons brothel run by Madam Chun Yi. Madam Chun forces all the newly kidnapped girls to be stripped nude, tied down, and inspected; upon finding out that one of the girls was deflowered by one of the kidnappers before she could start working, Madam Chun tracks the man down and kills him when he tries to run away. Ainu refuses to be subject to Madam Chun's methods, and constantly fights with her. Ainu's fiery attitude eventually gets her locked away in a cell and physically punished. After whipping a defiant Ainu, Madam Chun proceeds to lick the open wounds on the girl's back. Ainu befriends a mute young man who looks after her in her cell, and begs him to rescue her, but he non-verbally signals that he cannot break her out at this time.

Soon after, a group of rich nobles are invited to bet on courtesans. Madam Chun presents Ainu to them, who is dressed in new clothes and makeup, to her chagrin. The noble who wins, Master Wei, has her sedated before he rapes her. Afterwards, she is passed around to the other nobles who each sadistically give her a similar treatment. As a result, Ainu tries to hang herself in her bedroom, but is saved by the mute boy, Yan. In private, he reveals that he can, in fact, speak. He admits that Ainu reminds him of a love he lost long ago, which is why he feels he has to help Ainu. When Yan tries to take her away from the brothel, Madam Chun and her guards stop him, and although he tries to fight his way through them all, he is quickly killed. With no other immediate options, Ainu submits to Madam Chun and becomes a compliant courtesan. This entails pleasuring the Madam herself, who grows infatuated with Ainu.

Sometime later, the noble Master Yiao is found dead, so the village's chief constable pays Ainu a visit, as she was last seen with Yiao. However, he gets nowhere with her as she slyly dodges his questions. Madam Chun is warned by one of her men that Ainu is dangerous and might kill again. Chun sees Ainu at night, first attacking her as a test, then asking if Ainu plans to kill her, but Ainu claims that she couldn't live without her. The next night, Master Wei, another one of the nobles who raped Ainu, arranges a night with her. When the chief constable finds out about this arrangement, he tries to stop Ainu from potentially committing another murder. Despite his efforts, Wei is killed in a fire that Ainu started, and the chief doesn't have sufficient evidence to arrest her. He informs another noble that he is likely Ainu's next target, but he doesn't listen and is soon killed by Ainu via an overdose during an orgy. Ainu slips away from the chief once more due to her clever murder method. The last of the rich nobles who raped Ainu invites her over, but is ready to kill her if she tries anything. However, Ainu successfully seduces him, and he lowers his guard enough for her to stab him. The noble's guards and the chief force their way into the private chambers and attack Ainu, but she divulges that she was abducted and sold off to the brothel, describing the horrors she went through, which makes the chief realize who the true villains are.

An all-out battle breaks out as Ainu rebels against the brothel, frees the other courtesans, and fights off the guards. Madam Chun, blinded by her love for Ainu, sides with her, and the two kill all the guardsmen. Chun is critically wounded in the process, and Ainu explains to her that this was all part of her revenge scheme, and that she never actually loved Chun. She elaborates how she turned other people's love into a weapon of hate, and has now successfully killed all who hurt her. A shocked Chun tries to defend herself against Ainu, but her injuries lead to her defeat. As she lays dying in a bedroom, Chun admits that, despite everything, she still loves Ainu, and asks for one last kiss. Ainu obliges, but then Chun reveals, with her dying breath, that she sneaked a poison capsule into her mouth which is now eating away at both of their insides. Ainu writhes in pain before collapsing, and the chief constable arrives in the bedroom to witness Ainu's last moments, remorseful that he was too late.

== Cast ==
- Lily Ho - Ainu
- Betty Pei Ti - Chun Yi
- Yueh Hua - Chi Te
- Kong Ling - Prostitute
- Chan Lap-Ban - Lao Yao Gui
- Hung Ling-Ling - Prostitute
- Chan Mei-Hua - Ainu's maid
- Yuan Man-Tzu - Ainu's maid
- Michelle Yim - Ainu's maid

== Release ==
The film was released in Hong Kong on 9 July 1972. It was a box office hit in Hong Kong grossing HK$1,108,437.

The film was remade by Shaw Brothers Studios in 1984 as Lust for Love of a Chinese Courtesan.

== Reception ==
Tony Rayns reviewed an 83-minute dubbed language version of the film in The Monthly Film Bulletin in 1973. Rayns noted that though the editing done on the film removed "all its sex and some of its violence by the British censor, its programme-filler origins are still amply evident in its routine caricatures, the all too regular climaxes, the fatuous dubbed dialogue and the patchwork music track." Rayns concluded that the result was like an "extended gloss on the moment in Scarlet Empress when Dietrich both trumps and dismisses weaponry with a twist of her veil. Intimate Confessions lacks he compression and resonance of Sternberg, but it is none the less a genuine Z-movie equivalent."
