= Apartment for Ladies =

1970 Hong Kong film by Umetsugu Inoue

- Film poster
- Directed by: Umetsugu Inoue
- Written by: Umetsugu Inoue
- Produced by: Run Run Shaw
- Starring: Betty Ting; Lily Li; Teresa Ha; Ouyang Sha-fei; Alice Au Yin Ching
- Cinematography: Toru Watanabe
- Edited by: Chiang Hsing-lung
- Music by: Wang Fu-ling
- Distributed by: Shaw Brothers Studio; Celestial Pictures
- Release date: 20 November 1970
- Country: Hong Kong
- Language: Mandarin

Apartment for Ladies or Nu zi gong yu is a 1970 Hong Kong comedy film directed by Umetsugu Inoue. It was produced by Run Run Shaw of Shaw Brothers Studio.

== Plot ==
Songstress Betty Ting Pei travels from Hong Kong to Taiwan in search of her lost younger sister where she meets the composer Yang Fan and lodges at an apartment for women only run by a man-hating landlady, Mrs. Chan, yet Mrs. Chan cannot confine the young ladies youthful vitality.

== Cast ==
- Betty Ting - Yau Suk Man
- Lily Li - Jenny
- Teresa Ha - Lulu
- Ouyang Sha-fei - Mrs. Chan
- Alice Au Yin Ching – Ding
- Guo Man-Na - Betty
- Lee Pang-Fei - George Chan
- Wei Tzu-Yun - Tommy Chan
- Ding Sai - Laura
- Chow Ka-Lai - Nancy
- Erh Chun – Villager
