= Christine Pai =

Chinese actress from Hong Kong

- Chinese: 白露明
- Born: Hui Lai-king; January 6, 1937 (age 89)
- Other names: Christine Pai Lu-Ming, Pak Lo-Ming, Baak Lau-Ming, Bai Lou Ming, Bai Luming
- Occupation: Actress
- Years active: 1955–1966

Christine Pai (Chinese: 白露明) is a former actress from Hong Kong. Pai is credited with over 35 films.

== Early life ==
On January 6, 1937. Pai was born as Hui Lai-king in Hong Kong.

== Career ==
In 1955, Pai joined Tai Seng (Dasheng) Film Company and became an actress in Hong Kong films. Pai first appeared in Now That I've Got a Daughter, Everything's O.K. with Yam Kim-fai, a 1955 comedy film directed by Chiang Wai-Kwong. Pai was known for her appearance in Cantonese drama, comedy, martial arts, and Cantonese opera. Pai appeared in Spring Breeze Brings Back the Returned Swallow (aka The One Came Home), a 1958 Cantonese opera film directed by Wong Hok-Sing. Pai appeared in Bitter Lotus (Part 1 and Part 2), a 1960 drama film directed by Wong Toi. Pai appeared as Chang Li-Chen in The Greatest Civil War on Earth, a 1961 comedy film directed Wong Tin-Lam. Pai's last film was Mistaken Love, a 1966 Comedy film Wong Tin-Lam. Pai is credited with over 35 films.

== Filmography ==
=== Films ===
This is a partial list of films.

- 1955 Now That I've Got a Daughter, Everything's O.K.
- 1960 Bitter Lotus (Part 1 and Part 2)
- 1960 Second Spring
- 1961 The Greatest Civil War on Earth – Chang Li-Chen
- 1961 The Song of the Nightingale
- 1962 The Greatest Wedding on Earth – Lai/Pui-Ming
- 1964 The Greatest Love Affair on Earth
- 1966 Mistaken Love
- 1972 The Human Goddess
