= Betty Pei Ti =

Taiwanese actress

- 貝蒂
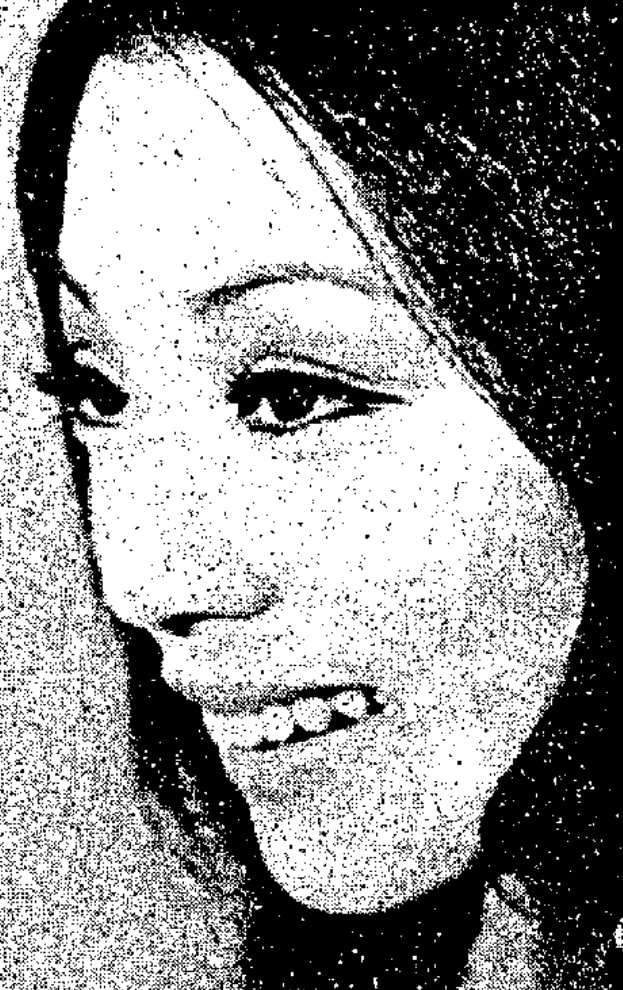
- Betty Pei Ti in 1973
- Born: Han Pai-chou (韓白綢); 10 November 1951 (age 73); Yilan City, Taiwan
- Occupation: actress
- Years active: 1972–1988, 2013
- Height: 1.8 m (5 ft 11 in)

Chinese name
- Traditional Chinese: 貝蒂
- Simplified Chinese: 貝蒂
Transcriptions
Standard Mandarin
- Hanyu Pinyin: Bèi dì
Yue: Cantonese
- Jyutping: bui3 dai3

Betty Pei Ti (Chinese: 貝蒂; pinyin: Bèidì; born 10 November 1951) is a Taiwanese actress. Though born in Taiwan, she is best known for her roles in Hong Kong films, particularly of the Shaw Brothers Studio.

== Early life ==
Pei was born Han Pai-chou (韓白綢) in Yilan City, Taiwan.

== Career ==
In 1971, while touring Hong Kong with a Chinese arts troupe, Pei came to the attention of director Chor Yuen. He asked her to star opposite Lily Ho in Intimate Confessions of a Chinese Courtesan, the Shaw Brothers' first gay (lesbian) film, released in 1972. Betty Pei Ti's performance endeared her to the studio, and she was persuaded to stay in Hong Kong and make movies. In the course of the 1970s, she became more active in Taiwanese cinema and by the end of the decade appeared exclusively in Taiwanese films. She continued acting in films until 1981.

== Filmography ==
=== Films ===
- 1972: I Am Exciting (Xin hua duo duo 心花朵朵)
- 1972: Intimate Confessions of a Chinese Courtesan (Ainu 爱奴) : Chun Yi
- 1972: Legends of Lust (Feng yue qi tan 风月奇谭)
- 1973: The Villains (Tu fei 土匪)
- 1973: Street Gangs of Hong Kong (Fen nu qing nian 愤怒青年): Fanny
- 1973: Police Woman (Nu jingcha 女警察)
- 1973: The House of 72 Tenants (Chat sup yee ga fong hak 七十二家房客)
- 1973: The Sugar Daddies (Tao se jing ji 桃色经纪): Irene Tsai
- 1973: The Iron Body Guard (Da dao Wang Wu 大刀王五): Chin Chu-hua (Camomile)
- 1973: Tales of Larceny (Niu gui she shen 牛鬼蛇神)
- 1974: The Suicide Murder (Mi huan xiong shou 迷幻嬌娃)
- 1974: Love in the Spring (Zhen zhen chun feng 陣陣春風)
- 1974: Niu Spacious Yard (Niu jia da yuan 牛家大院)
- 1973: Walking in the Rain (Yu zhong xing 雨中行)
- 1974: Shaolin Vengeance (Shao lin he shang 少林和尚) (as Petty)
- 1975: Qing chun xing
- 1975: Evergreen Tree (Chang qing shu 長青樹)
- 1975: Conspiracy of Thieves (Zei gong ji 賊公計)
- 1975: The Colorful Ripples (Long feng pei 龍鳳配)
- 1975: Heroes Behind Enemy Lines (Zhan di ying hao 戰地英豪)
- 1976: Qing chang zhan chang
- 1977: Five Pretty Young Ladies (Wu jiao wa 五嬌娃) (as Betty Pei)
- 1977: Princess and the Intoxicant (She shan gu nu 蛇山蠱女)
- 1977: Men of the Hour (Feng yun ren wu 風雲人物)
- 1977: Clans of Intrigue (Chu Liu Xiang 楚留香): princess Yin Chi
- 1977: Juedai Shuangjiao (絕代雙驕)
- 1978: Lu Dong Bin san xi Bai Mu Dan
- 1978: The Unique Lama (Da la ma 大喇嘛)
- 1980: Middle Kingdom's Mark of Blood (Zhong yuan yi dian hong 中原一點紅)
- 1980: Tu bao zi da tong guan (土包子打通關)
- 1981: A Centennial of Railways of ROC (Shang xing lie che 上行列車)
