= Wong Toi =

Hong Kong film director

- Died: 2 April 1964
- Occupation: Film director
- Years active: 1933–1964

Wong Toi (died 2 April 1964) was a film director in Hong Kong. He directed more than 30 films between 1933 from 1964.

Toi was Cantonese. He died on 2 April 1964.

== Filmography ==
- Flowers Fall and Catkins Fly (1933)
- Return from the Battleground (1934)
- Si sheng zi (1937)
- The Ghost Catcher (1939)
- Madame Butterfly (1948)
- Monk in Love (1950)
- The Valiant Dog (1953)
- Bitter Lotus: Part 1 (1960), starring Christine Pai
- Bitter Lotus: Part 2 (1960), starring Christine Pai
- A Girl Named Leng (1963)
- Man tang ji qing (1964)
