= The House of 72 Tenants =

1973 Hong Kong film by Chor Yuen

- Original Hong Kong Poster
- Chinese: 七十二家房客
- Hanyu Pinyin: Qī Shǐ Èr Jiā Fáng Ké
- Jyutping: Cat1 Sap6 Ji6 Gaa1 Fong4 Haak3
- Directed by: Chor Yuen
- Written by: Chor Yuen
- Produced by: Run Run Shaw; Andrew Au
- Starring: Yueh Hua; Adam Cheng; Woo Gam; Ching Li; Lydia Shum; Ivan Ho
- Cinematography: Wong Chit
- Edited by: Chiang Hsing Lung
- Music by: Frankie Chan
- Production companies: Shaw Brothers Studio; Hong Kong TV Broadcasts Ltd
- Distributed by: Shaw Brothers Studio
- Release date: 22 September 1973
- Running time: 98 minutes
- Country: Hong Kong
- Language: Cantonese
- Box office: HK$ 5,626,675.20

The House of 72 Tenants (七十二家房客) is a 1973 Hong Kong film directed by Chor Yuen. It is a remake of a 1963 Chinese film of the same name. It was the top box office film of 1973 in Hong Kong, surpassing Bruce Lee's Enter the Dragon.

== Plot ==
=== Part 1 ===
Early in the morning, Shanghai-po (a laundress tenant) goes to fetch a bucket of water from the slum's public water pump, but quickly has trouble making the water come out. The film then goes on to introduce the many tenants living in the slum and how helpful and friendly they are to each other. Once the water pump starts working, Pak-ku (the slum's cruel landlady) scolds the tenants to turn off the water because they're using too much. Shanghai-po reminds Pak-ku saying that everyone pays their share of the water bill and how she made a deal with Pak-ku to iron and wash Pak-ku's laundry in return for unlimited buckets of water. Pak-ku makes a new rule for all the tenants, saying that from now on, everyone only gets one bucket of water a day! Shanghai-po is outraged by this because she runs a laundry washing service. However, Ah Fook (a really smart olive vendor tenant) backs Shanghai-po up by saying that everyone can save half of their daily water aside for Shanghai-po (meaning Shanghai-po will get at least 32 buckets of water a day!). Pak-ku then drags Shanghai-po out of her house to argue with her, but while they argue, the pants that Shanghai-po was ironing have a hole burnt through them. After thinking that the pants belonged to Dr. Kim (a doctor tenant), they actually belonged to Chow Bing Ken (Pak-ku's sleazy husband). This results in both Pak-ku and Chow Bing Ken physically abusing Ah Heung (their adopted daughter). However, Fat Chai (the newly moved-in cobbler tenant) defends Ah Heung. Fat Chai and Chow Bing Ken get into a fight. During the fight, Pak-ku steals a beautiful piece of cloth from Mr and Mrs Chan (a couple who are tailors) and stuffs the cloth into her husband's pocket; however, he is caught in the act by Ah Fook.

=== Part 2 ===
Ah Fook ends up being robbed of his money in a scheme by 369 (a corrupt police officer who is secretly being bribed by Chow Bing Ken). When Ah Fook goes back home, his wife has gone to borrow money to pay for a doctor's visit because their baby has a fever. However, she ends up being robbed by thieves on the way back home. After all of the tenants pitch in to give their money to Ah Fook's wife, Fat Chai gets into an argument with Pak-Ku which involves him knocking out her floorboards. Pak-ku then leaves, Chow Bing Ken tries raping Ah Heung but is stopped by Fat Chai who screams fire after witnessing Ah Heung scream. The firefighters then force Chow Bing Ken and Pak-ku to pay for a false alarm (especially after finding out they are the landlord and landlady and that they are rich).

=== Part 3 ===
Chow Bing Ken tries making 369 arrest Fat Chai, but this results in 369 getting a nail jabbed into his foot and several of his teeth being pulled out. Pak-Ku then tries kicking out Uncle Yeung (a cigar-selling old man tenant), but all the tenants pitch in to pay Uncle Yeung's rent. Even Mr and Mrs Han (Mr Han is a college student while Mrs Han is a college graduate who works as a nightclub hostess to pay their rent) sacrifice Mr Han's medicine money (Mr Han has tuberculosis).

=== Part 4/Finale ===
Chow Bing Ken and Pak-Ku then try making 369 arrest Mrs Han, but his plans are foiled by Ah Fook. They then try framing Fat Chai for stealing, but their plans are foiled by Ah Heung who loves Fat Chai. Ah Heung is then forced into an arranged marriage to the local governor by Pak-ku and Chow Bing Ken. However, they come up with a plan that works – Ah Heung is rolled into a carpet and is delivered out of the slum by Fat Chai who pretends that his friend who has Cholera is rolled into the carpet. Everyone then pretends that they have Cholera, and Dr Kim even slips a medicine that causes diarrhea into a glass of tea that Pak-ku is drinking. Fat Chai and Ah Heung are safely delivered to a train station together, Pak-ku and Chow Bing Ken are arrested for their crimes. 369 is also arrested for taking bribes, and the tenants no longer need to worry about being kicked out or their home being turned into a brothel.

== Cast ==
- Yueh Hua - Fat Chai
- Ouyang Sha-fei
- Chan Shen - Brother Shum
- Adam Cheng
- Cheng Hong-Yip
- Cheng Kang
- Chen Kuan Tai - Police Constable (cameo)
- Ching Miao
- Chor Yuen - thief in market (cameo)
- Chung Hwa
- Do Ping
- Got Dik Wa
- Lily Ho
- Ivan Ho
- Hu Ching
- Ricky Hui
- Ku Feng
- Lau Tan
- Law Lan
- Cheng Lee - Ah Heung (credited as Ching Li)
- Danny Lee
- Lee Sau Kei
- Leung Tin
- Liu Hui-Ling
- Nan Hong
- Peng Peng
- Sai Gwa-pau
- Shih Szu
- Lydia Shum - Shanghai Po
- Tien Ching - Chow Bing Ken
- Betty Pei Ti
- Wang Chung (actor)
- Wong Ching-Ho
- Wong Kwong Yue
- Karen Yeh - Mrs. Han
- Yeung Chak Lam

== Special notes ==
The House of 72 Tenants can be considered to have started a new era for Hong Kong film industry. Before the release of this movie, most high-class movies filmed in the then British colony were shot and recorded in Mandarin, while the less-respected ones would be shot and recorded in Cantonese. However, since the debut of the movie, which was filmed in Cantonese, and the popularity it achieved, subsequent major Hong Kong films switched their language from Mandarin to Cantonese. This movie is a remake of a black and white Cantonese movie (1963) of the same name.

== Parodies ==
Parodies of this movie are found in many of Hong Kong's films and television series.

In movies:

- He Ain't Heavy, He's My Father: Chor Yuen, the director of The House of 72 Tenants, is part of the cast.
- Kung Fu Hustle

In TV series:

- Enjoy Yourself Tonight: Lydia Shum continues to play the role of 'Shanhai-por' from this movie.

== See also ==
- 72 Tenants of Prosperity
