= Ng Wai =

- Chinese: 吳瑋
- Other name: Wu Wei
- Occupation: Actress

Ng Wai (Chinese: 吳瑋) is a former Chinese actress from Hong Kong.

== Filmography ==
=== Films ===
This is a partial list of films.

- 1953 Yu nu qing chou
- 1954 Gui lai Landlady
- 1964 Lovers' Rock as Hui Tan
- 1965 Xiao yun que
- 1965 Songfest as Madam Li
- 1965 Huo shao hong lian si zhi yuan yang jian xia
- 1966 Wen Suchen as Tso Shi
- 1966 Princess Iron Fan as Mother Cicada Fiary
- 1967 Fei tian nu lang
- 1967 Nu xun an
- 1967 Dai lu nian hua as Mao a-mah
- 1967 The Dragon Creek
- 1967 Hong Kong Nocturne
- 1967 The Cave of the Silken Web
- 1967 Ru xia
- 1967 Shan Shan
- 1968 Hong Kong Rhapsody - credited as Ng Wai
- 1968 Hua yue liang xiao
- 1968 Guai xia
- 1968 Duan hun gu
- 1968 Hu xia
- 1968 Divorce, Hong Kong Style
- 1969 Bi hai qing tian ye ye xin
- 1969 The Golden Sword
- 1970 Yi chi chun shui
- 1970 Shuang xi ling men
- 1970 Er nu shi wo men de
- 1970 A Time for Love
- 1970 Ai qing de dai jia as Madam buyer
- 1970 Tie luo han
- 1971 The Silent Love
- 1972 The Human Goddess
- 1972 Duo xie lao ban niang
- 1972 Wa wa fu ren
- 1972 Fists of Vengeance as Brothel madam
- 1972 Shao nai nai de si wa
- 1972 Wang ming tu
- 1973 Bei di yan zhi
- 1974 The Chinese Tiger
- 1974 The Suicide Murder
- 1974 E hu cun
- 1974 Naughty! Naughty!
- 1975 Xiao Shandong dao Xianggang
- 1976 Lian ai gong fu
