= Sin-hung Tam =

Chinese opera singer and actress from Hong Kong

- Chinese: 譚倩紅
- Born: August 28, 1931 (age 95); Macau
- Other names: Tam Sin-hung, Tam Sin Hung, Tam Siu-Hung
- Occupations: Chinese opera singer; actress
- Years active: 1953–2000

Sin-hung Tam (Chinese: 譚倩紅) is a Chinese opera singer and actress from Hong Kong. Tam is credited with over 140 films.

== Early life ==
On August 28, 1931, Tam was born in Macau.

== Career ==
At age 13, Tam entered the entertainment business and started her career performing Cantonese opera. Tam studied under Yam Kim-fai. In 1953, Tam crossed over as an actress in Hong Kong films. Tam appeared in Sworn to Love, a 1953 comedy film directed by Chiang Wai-Kwong. Tam appeared in The Lion's Roar with both Yam Kim-fai and Pak Suet Sin, a 1959 Cantonese opera film directed by Chiang Wai-Kwong. In 1970, Tam retired from the Cantonese film industry, but in 1987, she returned to acting. Tam is known for her role as Auntie Yung in A Kindred Spirit (1995–1999), a television drama series that was broadcast on TVB Jade in Hong Kong. Tam's last film was Textiles at Heart, a 2000 romance film directed by Mak Kin-Bong. Tam is credited with over 140 films.

== Filmography ==
=== Films ===
This is a partial list of films.

- 1953 Sworn to Love
- 1953 Woman in Grief
- 1954 Eighteen Marriages of a Smart Girl
- 1955 The Faithful Wife
- 1957 Wong Fei-Hung's Rebellion, Part 1 - villainess Daji
- 1958 Wong Fei-Hung's Rebellion (sequel)
- 1959 The Lion's Roar
- 1963 The Young Boss of the Factory (aka Fun in the Factory) - spy
- 1965 The Six-fingered Lord of the Lute (Part 1) (aka The Ghost with Six Fingers)
- 1967 Green-Eyed Demon
- 1967 The Three Swordsmen
- 1987 Seven Years Itch - Sylvia's mother
- 1995 Fatal Assignment
- 1995 Summer Snow - Ying Sun, Bing's mother
- 1996 Hu-Du-Men - Auntie Ming
- 1997 A Queer Story (1997)
- 2000 Textiles at Heart - Wen's mother

=== Television ===
- 1995–1999 A Kindred Spirit - Auntie Yung

== Personal life ==
Tam's husband was Tak Keung Lam (died 2015).
