= Princess Iron Fan (1966 film) =

1966 Hong Kong film by Ho Meng Hua

- Film poster
- Directed by: Ho Meng Hua
- Screenplay by: Cheng Kang
- Based on: Journey to the West by Wu Cheng'en
- Produced by: Runme Shaw
- Starring: Pat Ting Hung; Ho Fan; Yueh Hua; Cheng Pei-pei; Lily Ho
- Cinematography: Lin Kuo-Hsiang; Lin Wen Chin; Tung Shao-yung
- Edited by: Chiang Hsing-lung
- Music by: Lu Zhongren; Huang Yijun
- Production company: Shaw Brothers Studio
- Release date: 10 August 1966 (Hong Kong)
- Running time: 93 minutes
- Country: Hong Kong
- Languages: Mandarin; Cantonese

Princess Iron Fan (Chinese: 鐵扇公主; pinyin: Tie shan gong zhu) is a 1966 Hong Kong film, the second in a series of four Shaw Brothers productions (1966–1968) based on the 16th-century novel Journey to the West. It was directed by Ho Meng Hua.

The other films of the series are Monkey Goes West (1966), The Cave of the Silken Web (1967) and The Land of Many Perfumes (1968).

== Cast ==
- Pat Ting Hung as Princess Iron Fan
- Ho Fan as Tang Sanzang
- Yueh Hua as Sun Wukong
- Cheng Pei-pei as White Skeleton (Baigujing)
- Lily Ho as Sister White Skeleton
- Ching Miao as The Ox King
- Ho Li Jen as Disenfranchised villager
- Ku Feng as Distraught old man
- Ku Wen-chung as Wu Jing-chi
- Lily Li as Chambermaid
- Pan Yin Tze as Cavern dancer
- Peng Peng as Zhu Bajie
- Shen Yi as Mistress Fox spirit
- Tien Shun as Sha Wujing
- Wen Hsiu as Distraught old woman
- Wu Ching-li as Cavern dancer
- Wu Wei as Mother Cicada Fiary

== See also ==
- Princess Iron Fan (1941 animated film)
