= Kam-Neong Ma =

Chinese actress from Hong Kong

- Chinese: 馬金娘
- Born: Singapore
- Other names: Ma Gam-Leong, Ma Jin-Niang, Ma Kam-Neong
- Occupation: Actress
- Years active: 1935–1967
- Relatives: Ma Siu-Ying (sister)

Kam-Neong Ma (Chinese: 馬金娘) is a Chinese former actress from Hong Kong. Ma is credited with over 55 films.

== Early life ==
Ma was born in Guangdong province, China. Ma's sister was Ma Siu-Ying (1908–1978).

== Career ==
In 1935, Ma became an actress in Hong Kong films. Ma first appeared in Opera Stars and Song Girls, a 1935 Cantonese opera film directed by Kwan Ting-Yam. Ma appeared as a lead actress in The Seductive Empress Now and Then, a 1939 Drama film directed by Hung Chung-Ho and Ma appeared as Empress Lau in Judge Bao Vs. the Eunuch, a 1939 Historical Drama film directed by Wan Hoi-Leng and Hung Chung-Ho. Ma appeared as Empress Dowager in Happy Ending, a 1963 Cantonese opera film directed by Chu Kei. In Ma's later acting career, she appeared in mother roles such as Love Burst (1966), and Little Foursome Family (1966). Ma's last film was Adventure of a Blind Kid, a 1967 Drama film directed by Mok Hong-See. Ma is credited with over 55 films.

== Filmography ==
=== Films ===
This is a partial list of films.

- 1935 Opera Stars and Song Girls
- 1939 The Seductive Empress Now and Then
- 1939 Judge Bao Vs. the Eunuch – Empress Lau
- 1966 The Elusive Golden Butterfly
- 1966 Love Burst (aka Agrrieve My Wife) – Kong's mother
- 1966 Little Foursome Family
- 1967 Adventure of a Blind Kid
