= The Golden Knight =

1970 Hong Kong film by Yueh Feng

- Film poster
- 金衣大俠
- Directed by: Yueh Feng
- Written by: Yeh I-fang
- Produced by: Runme Shaw
- Starring: Lily Ho; Kao Yuen; Shu Pei-pei
- Cinematography: Pao Hsueh-Li
- Edited by: Chiang Hsing-Lung
- Music by: Wang Fu-Ling
- Production company: Shaw Brothers Studio
- Release date: 17 April 1970 (Hong Kong)
- Running time: 95 minutes
- Country: Hong Kong
- Language: Mandarin

The Golden Knight (金衣大俠) is a 1970 Hong Kong wuxia film directed by Yueh Feng and starring Lily Ho.

== Synopsis ==
After her father's death at the hands of the Golden Knight Clan, swordswoman Yu Feixia is accused of killing a clan member in vengeance. To prove her innocence, Yu attempts to track down the real killer.

== Cast ==
- Lily Ho as Yu Feixia
- Kao Yuen as Liu Yinan
- Shu Pei-pei as Aiqing
