= Kar-Yee Lam =

Chinese actress from Hong Kong

- Chinese: 林家儀
- Born: 1927 (age 98–99)
- Other names: Lam Kar Yee, Lam Ga-Yee
- Occupation: Actress
- Years active: 1948–1959
- Relatives: Ka-Sing Lam (brother)

Kar-Yee Lam (Chinese: 林家儀) is a former actress from Hong Kong. Lam is credited with over 120 films.

== Early life ==
Lam was born in 1927. Lam's brother was Ka-Sing Lam. In 1936, Lam's mother died. Lam and her brother were raised up by their father. When Hong Kong was under Japanese occupation, Lam's family fled from Hong Kong to Guangzhou, China, and returned to Hong Kong later.

== Career ==
In 1948, Lam's acting career started. Lam appeared in The Thirteenth Girl's Adventure in Nengren Temple, a 1948 Martial Arts film directed by Hung Chung-Ho. Lam appeared as Yeung Kau-Mui or Ninth sister in The Eight Yang Sister Seeks Golden Knife, a 1949 Martial Arts Cantonese Opera film directed by Chu Kei. Lam appeared in The Twelve Beauties with both Yam Kim-fai and Pak Suet Sin, a 1952 Cantonese opera film directed by Chan Pei. Lam appeared as Siu Yuk in The Peach Blossom Fairy's Second Visit to the World of Men, a 1959 Cantonese opera film directed by Yeung Kung-Leung. Lam is credited with over 120 films.

== Filmography ==
=== Films ===
This is a partial list of films.

- 1948 The Thirteenth Girl's Adventure in Nengren Temple
- 1948 Wealth Is Like a Dream
- 1949 The Eight Yang Sister Seeks Golden Knife – Yeung Kau-Mui, Ninth sister
- 1950 Nazha Shatters the Yellow River Scheme – Madam Bik Siu
- 1951 The Scatterbrain – Hung Sam
- 1952 Night of Romance – Wong Suet-Yee
- 1952 Red and White Peonies – Kam-Ling
- 1952 The Twelve Beauties – Cantonese opera
- 1954 The Sword and the Gold Hairpin
- 1957 Eight Dames Tease the Scholar
- 1957 The Fox-Spirit's Romance – Phoenix Spirit
- 1957 The Naughty Princess and Her Lover
- 1959 The Peach Blossom Fairy's Second Visit to the World of Men
