= Adventure in Paradise =

1970 Hong Kong film by Jingbo Chen

- Directed by: Jingbo Chen
- Written by: Zhaozhang Lu
- Distributed by: Feng Huang Motion Pictures
- Release date: 9 April 1970
- Country: Hong Kong
- Language: Mandarin

Adventure in Paradise or Tian tang qi yu is a 1970 Hong Kong adventure film directed by Jingbo Chen.

== Cast ==
- Henry Fong
- Ming Jiang
- Shek Lui
- Hua Xiang
