= Siu-Yi Yung =

Chinese actress from Hong Kong

- Chinese: 容小意
- Born: Yung Kam-chi; 1921; Shanghai, China
- Died: 1974 (aged 52–53); Hong Kong
- Other names: Yung Siu-yi, Rong Xiaoyi, Yong Xiao-Yi, Siu-Yee Yung
- Occupation: Actress
- Years active: 1938–1969
- Known for: Co-founder of Union Film Enterprise
- Relatives: Yuk-Yi Yung (sister)

Siu-Yi Yung (Chinese: 容小意) (1921–1974) was a former Chinese actress from Hong Kong. Yung was credited with over 135 films.

== Early life ==
In 1921, Yung was born as Yung Kam-chi in Shanghai, China. Yung's sister was Yuk-Yi Yung.

== Career ==
At age 14, Yung and her sister joined Plum Blossom Song and Dance Troupe. In 1938, Yung became an actress with Nanyang Film Company in Hong Kong. Yung first appeared as To Fa in The Purple Cups, a 1938 film directed by Hou Yao. Yung appeared as a lead actress in Breaking Through the Bronze Net, a 1939 Martial Arts film directed by Hung Suk-Wan. In 1952, Yung co-founded The Union Film Enterprise Ltd. Yung's last film is The Adventures of Courtship, a 1969 Comedy film directed by Cho Kei and Lee Hang. Yung was credited with over 135 films.

== Filmography ==
=== Films ===
This is a partial list of films.

- 1938 The Purple Cups – To Fa
- 1947 Yonder My Love
- 1952 The Prodigal Son – Fanny Luk
- 1953 Family – Kam
- 1953 Spring – Cousin
- 1954 Autumn – Cousin
- 1954 Spring's Flight – Cousin
- 1954 Sworn Sisters – Ah Sam
- 1956 Madam Mei
- 1958 Murderer in Town – Fa Mung-Na
- 1960 The Wonderful Partner
- 1961 Long Live the Money – Eighth concubine
- 1967 Confused Love
- 1967 My Darling Wife
- 1969 From Here to Eternity
- 1969 The Adventures of Courtship – Mrs. Lam

== Personal life ==
Yung's husband was Lee Ching. On March 17, 1974, Yung died from leukemia in Hong Kong.
