= Fan Ho =

Chinese photographer and film director

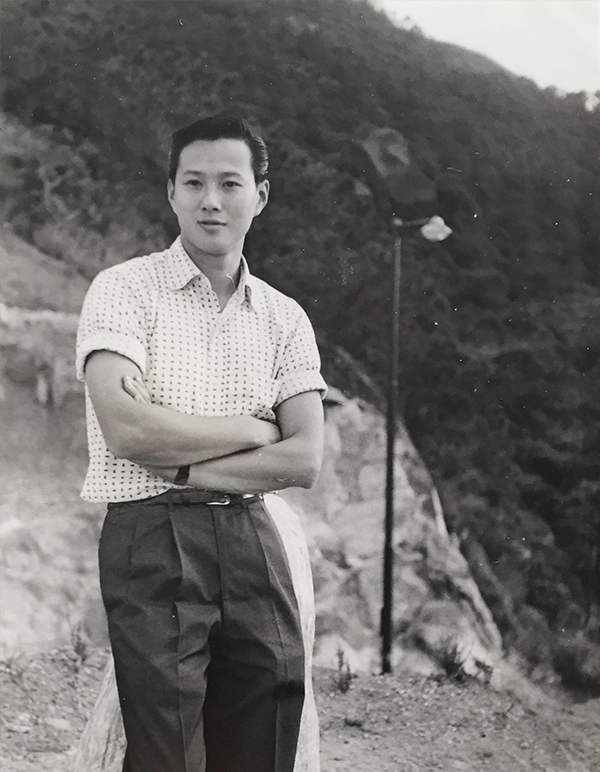
- Born: 8 October 1931; Shanghai, China
- Died: 19 June 2016 (aged 84); San Jose, California, US
- Occupations: Photographer, film director, and actor

Chinese name
- Chinese: 何藩
Transcriptions
Standard Mandarin
- Hanyu Pinyin: Hé Fān
Yue: Cantonese
- Jyutping: ho^{4}faan^{4}
- Website: fanho-forgetmenot.com

Fan Ho (Chinese: 何藩; Jyutping: ho^{4}faan^{4}; 8 October 1931 (Note: The year of birth is from the Hong Kong Film Archive online catalog, in other less reliable sources his year of birth is given as 1930, 1931, or 1932.) – 19 June 2016) was a Chinese photographer, film director, and actor. From 1956, he won over 280 awards from international exhibitions and competitions worldwide for his photography.

== Photography career ==
Fan Ho was born in Shanghai in 1931, and emigrated with his family to Hong Kong in 1949. At the outbreak of war in 1941, Ho's parents were stranded in Macau for several years and Ho was left in the care of a family servant. Ho began photographing at a very young age with a Brownie which his father had left at home, and later with a Rolleiflex twin-lens reflex camera his father gave him at the age of 14. Largely self-taught, his photos display a fascination with urban life, explored alleys, slums, markets and streets. Much of his work consists of candid photographs of the street vendors and children only a few years younger than himself. He developed his images in the family bathtub and soon had built up a significant body of work, chronicling Hong Kong in the 1950s and 1960s as it was becoming a major metropolitan centre. Ho would use the same Rolleiflex K4A throughout his career.

... I've always believed that any work of art should stem from genuine feelings and understandings ... I didn't work with any sense of purpose. As an artist, I was only looking to express myself. I did it to share my feelings with the audience. I need to be touched emotionally to come up with meaningful works. When the work resonates with the audience, it's a satisfaction that money can't buy. My purpose is simple: I try not to waste my audience's time. [Laughs]

— Ho Fan, 2014 interview with Edmund Lee

Upon seeing Ho's work for the first time in 2006, gallery owner Laurence Miller commented that "[they] felt like direct descendants of the Bauhaus, yet they were made in Hong Kong. They were abstract and humanistic at the same time."

Ho was a Fellow of the Photographic Society of America, the Royal Photographic Society and the Royal Society of Arts in England, and an Honorary Member of the Photographic Societies of Singapore, Argentina, Brazil, Germany, France, Italy and Belgium. Ho was named one of the "Top Ten Photographers of the World" by the Photographic Society of America between 1958 and 1965.

=== "Approaching Shadow", 1954 《陰影》 ===
"Approaching Shadow" (Chinese: 陰影) was one of Ho's most famous works. He asked a cousin to pose by a wall at Queen's College in Causeway Bay and added a diagonal shadow in the darkroom to symbolize that "her youth will fade away" since "everyone has the same destiny". A print of "Approaching Shadow" sold for a record HK$375,000 in 2015.

== Film career ==
Ho was a Hong Kong film director and actor.

He joined Shaw Brothers in 1961 to develop his career in cinema. He started as a continuity assistant in the movie The Swallow (1961) and moved on to act in several movies for Shaw. Ho played the Monk, Tripitaka, in the lavish Shaw Brothers adaption of Journey to the West four-picture cycle of films. Ho became disillusioned with Shaw's revenue-driven formula, and sought creative relief in photography and in other studios.

During the early 1960s he also produced a series of independent short films, the first of which, Big City Little Man (大都市 小人物; 1963, 30 min), won the "Honor Award Certificate" from the Japan International Film Festival in 1964.

People tell me it seems my photographic works have stories, have some drama. That’s why, later on, I became a film director. Both use images to tell their story, to express the emotions of the author. Photography and filmmaking are like sisters. One is still and one is moving—that is the only difference.

— Ho Fan, 2012 HK Magazine article

Ho left Shaw Brothers in 1969 to develop his career as a director, making over 20 films with various studios in Hong Kong and Taiwan. He has had three films in the "Official Selection" of the International Film Festivals of Cannes, Berlin and San Francisco; and five of his films have been selected in the "Permanent Collection" of the National Film Archives of Taiwan and Hong Kong. As well as his independent film work he worked in erotic cinema (Category III films), with such films as Adventure in Denmark (1973), The Girl with the Long Hair (1975) and Temptation Summary (1990).

According to Mark Pinsukanjana, director of Modernbook Gallery in San Francisco, CA, his debut feature, Lost (1969), was Ho's favourite. As Pinsukanjana says:

In Lost, one will see the chaotic life of one man in Hong Kong. The film follows him and finds the beauty that surrounds him; he is lost because he never saw it. I think that one can say that this is similar to Fan Ho's photographs in the sense that Hong Kong is crowded, busy and chaotic to many, but for Fan Ho, he was able to convert [what he found] and find beauty."

He also served on the jury of the Golden Horse Film Festival and Awards festival and Hong Kong Film Awards.

== Post-retirement career ==
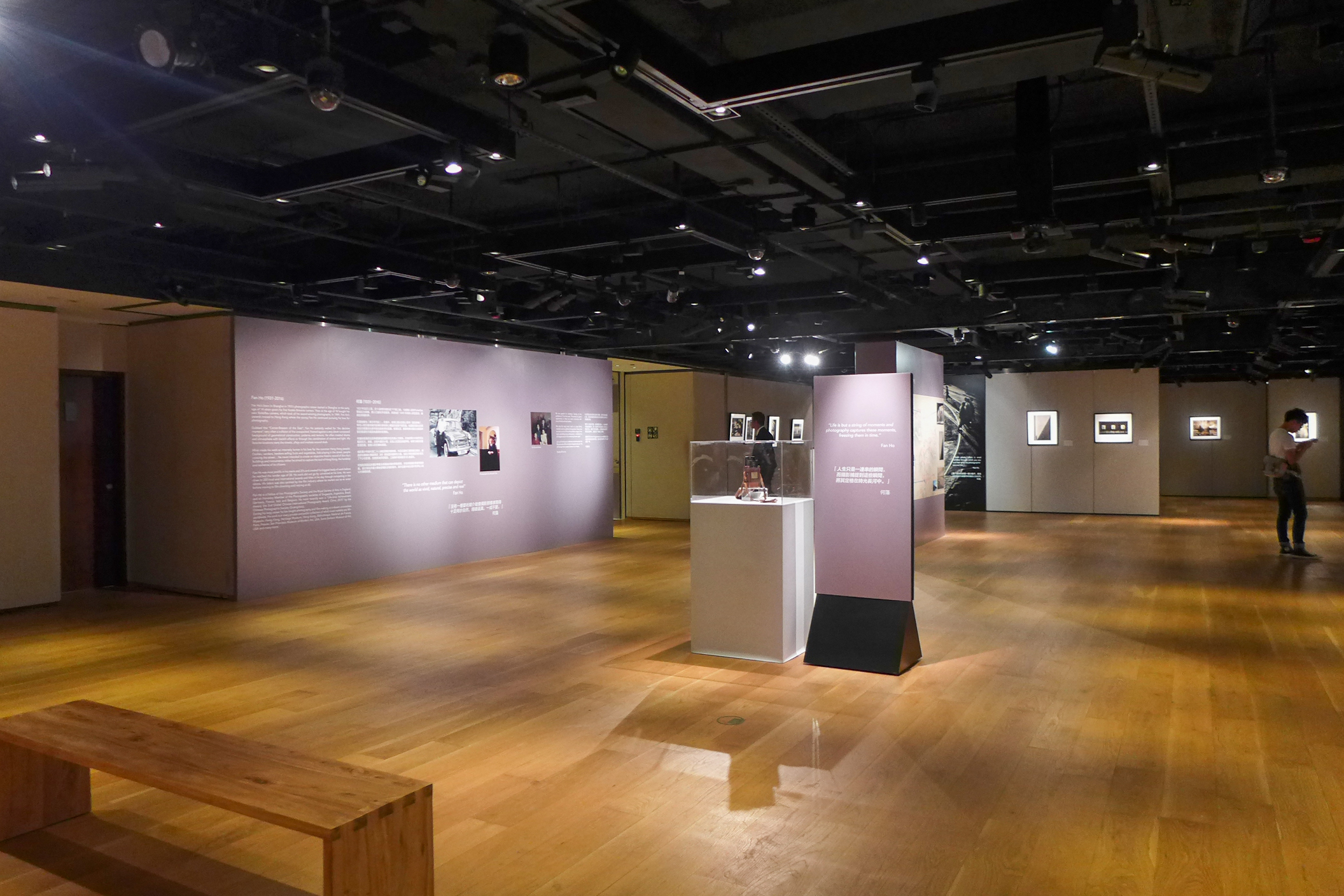
"Fan Ho : Visual Dialogues" Exhibition at Sotheby's Hong Kong Gallery in 2017

Ho's wife and children emigrated to San Jose, California in 1979 to pursue a university education and he followed in 1995 after retiring from cinema. Restless in retirement, Ho's health began to decline until his family suggested that he pursue photography again. Rather than using modern equipment and taking photographs locally in the San Francisco Bay Area, Ho went through his old negatives from Hong Kong and began showing his portfolio to local galleries.

He exhibited slides of his photographs, some of which were in the permanent collection at SFMOMA, at the 1998 New Asian Cinema Festival, which was screening his 1988 film Carnal Desire at the 4 Star Theater in San Francisco. A chance meeting with Mark Pinsukanjana in 1999 led to Ho being featured at Pinsukanjana's Modernbook Gallery in Palo Alto in 2000, his first solo exhibition since the 1960s, and in 2001, and Ho's films and photographs continued to be shown at festivals hosted at the 4 Star. Ho's daughter credits the first Palo Alto exhibition in 2000 with restoring Ho's confidence and happiness.

Modernbook went on to stage his vintage work at photoLA in January 2006, and upon seeing his photographs of Hong Kong, fellow gallery owner Laurence Miller was moved to acquire 26 prints and put on a solo exhibit for Ho in New York City later that year. Ho would go on to publish a new monograph, Hong Kong Yesterday in 2006 after receiving international attention for this early work. By compositing old negatives, Ho continued to produce new prints of scenes that have now vanished from modern Hong Kong. Many of the resulting composited prints were published for the first time in his final monograph A Hong Kong Memoir in 2014, following exhibits of the same title at Modernbook in summer 2011 and from December 2014 to January 2015.

He died in San Jose on 19 June 2016 of pneumonia at the age of 84. Posthumously, thirty-two photographs taken in 1950s Hong Kong as well as related objects, including his Rolleiflex camera and an early book, Thoughts on Street Photography, were exhibited at Sotheby's Hong Kong gallery in the last half of June 2017. A new photo book, Portrait of Hong Kong, was published in June 2017 to coincide with the exhibition. It was prefaced by the filmmaker John Woo.

Portrait of Hong Kong 《念香港人的舊》 contains 153 new street photographs which were selected from 500 negatives chosen by Ho before he died in 2016. After his death, his surviving family members spent about a year completing the project, together with support from Sarah Greene (Blue Lotus Gallery) and WE Press (香港人出版). 20 quotable excerpts from Ho's earliest book, Thoughts on Street Photography 《街頭攝影叢談》, were included. These 153 photographs provide not only glimpses of Hong Kong in the 1950s and 1960s but also recall the indomitable spirit of the people at the time. This body of realistic street photographs were never highly recognized during the 1950s and 1960s, despite being Ho's favorites, as quoted in Ho's reply to Sarah Greene during one of her visits to Ho in early 2016. The quote appeared in the afterword of his latest monograph:

My realistic street photos are rarely selected. Pictorial aesthetics and images with a sense of humor are still the key for salon photos but I expect changes to happen soon. In the meantime, I will just keep trying.

— Fan Ho, Afterword by Sarah Greene in Portrait of Hong Kong

Ho's family also established a website to celebrate his life and work.

== Works by Ho ==
=== Short films ===
- Big City Little Man / 大都市 小人物 (1963, 30 min, Hong Kong)
- Home Work / 習作之 (1966, 40 min, Hong Kong)
- Gulf / 離 : (1966 Banbury England Best Film Award, 15 min, Hong Kong)

=== Feature films ===
Year	Title	Role	Market	Production company	Notes
1961	Love Without End 《不了情》	Actor (Tang's brother)	Hong Kong	Shaw Brothers	
1963	Revenge of a Swordswoman 《原野奇俠傳》	Actor	Hong Kong	Shaw Brothers	
1964	The Female Prince 《雙鳳奇緣》	Actor (Hsiao's step-brother)	Hong Kong	Shaw Brothers	
1965	Vermilion Door 《紅伶淚》	Actor (Luo Shao-Hua)	Hong Kong	Shaw Brothers	
1965	Inside the Forbidden City 《宋宮秘史》	Actor (Empress Di's son)	Hong Kong	Shaw Brothers	
1966	The Perfumed Arrow 《女秀才》	Actor (Wei Zhuan-Zi)	Hong Kong	Shaw Brothers	
1966	The Blue and the Black (Parts 1 and 2) 《藍與黑》 (上) and (下)	Actor (Hui Ya's husband)	Hong Kong	Shaw Brothers	
1966	The Monkey Goes West 《西遊記》	Actor (Monk Tang Xuan-Zang)	Hong Kong	Shaw Brothers	(Note: Part of the four-film Shaw Brothers adaptation of Journey to the West)
1966	Princess Iron Fan 《鐵扇公主》	Actor (Monk Tang Xuan-Zang)	Hong Kong	Shaw Brothers	
1966	The Joy of Spring 《歡樂青春》	Actor	Hong Kong	Shaw Brothers	
1967	The Cave of the Silken Web 《盤絲洞》	Actor (Monk Tang Xuan-Zang)	Hong Kong	Shaw Brothers	
1967	Madame Slender Plum aka Under the Spell of Love 《慾海情魔》	Actor (David Xu)	Hong Kong	Shaw Brothers	
1967	Sweet Is Revenge 《大俠復仇記》	Actor (David Li)	Hong Kong	Shaw Brothers	
1967	Susanna 《珊珊》	Actor (Yu Chih Chien)	Hong Kong	Shaw Brothers	
1968	The Land of Many Perfumes 《女兒國》	Actor (Monk Tang Xuan-Zang)	Hong Kong	Shaw Brothers	
1969	The Millionaire Chase 《釣金龜》	Actor (Sun Jia Wen)	Hong Kong	Shaw Brothers	
1969	Miss Fragrance aka The Lovely Girl 《香噴噴小姐》	Actor (Dr. Lam Kin-Wah)	Hong Kong	Kam Bo Motion Picture Co.	
1969	Lost 《迷》	Director	Hong Kong		
1970	Feng Kuang Chia Jen 《瘋狂佳人》	Actor	Taiwan		
1970	What's Good for a Goose 《大丈夫能屈能伸》	Actor	Hong Kong	Ming Xing Film Company	
1970	Golden Sword and the Blind Swordswoman 《金劍》	Actor	Taiwan	Wa Ha Ying Yip Gung Shut	
1970	The Great Wall 《孟姜女》	Actor	Taiwan	Hong Kong Rong Hua Co. Lee Ming Film Co.	
1970	From Home with Love 《警告逃妻》	Actor	Taiwan	Ta Chung Motion Picture Co.	
1971	I Asked the Clouds 《問白雲》	Actor	Taiwan		
1971	Song of Happy Life aka Naughty Songstress 《淘氣女歌手》	Actor	Hong Kong	Kam Bo Motion Picture Co.	
1972	The Song of Thailand 《湄南河之歌》	Actor	Hong Kong	Tsun Lee Film Company	
1972	Love and Blood 《血愛》	Director	Hong Kong	Wai Diy	
1972	Golden Rose 《金玫瑰》	Actor	Taiwan	Hong Kong Rong Hua Co. Lee Ming Film Co.	
1973	Adventure in Denmark 《春滿丹麥》	Director	Hong Kong	Wai Diy	
1973	Na Cha and the Seven Devils 《梅山收七怪》	Actor (Qiu Ping)	Hong Kong	Shaw Brothers	
1974	The Adventurous Air-Steward 《空中少爺》	Director	Hong Kong	Goldig Films (H.K.) Ltd.	
1975	The Miserable Girl 《昨夜星辰昨夜風》	Director	Hong Kong		
1975	Girl with the Long Hair 《長髮姑娘》	Cinematographer, director	Hong Kong	Shaw Brothers	
1976	Body for Sale 《賣身》	Director	Hong Kong	Lo Wei Motion Picture Co., Ltd.	
1977	Innocent Lust 《初哥初女初夜情》	Director	Hong Kong	Shaw Brothers	
1977	Go a Little Crazy aka Encore 《戇哥哥》	Director	Hong Kong	Daai Sing	
1978	The Notorious Frameup 《淫獸》	Director	Hong Kong	Shaw Brothers	
1978	Hello Sexy Late Homecomers 《哈囉床上夜歸人》	Director	Hong Kong	Shaw Brothers	
1980	Two for the Road aka Taipei My Love 《台北吾愛》 aka 《姻緣道》	Cowriter, Director	Taiwan	Seasonal Film Corporation	
1982	Expensive Tastes 《花劫》	Writer, director	Hong Kong		
1985	Smile Again 《花女情狂》	Director	Hong Kong	Golden Harvest	
1986	Yu Pui Tsuen 《玉蒲團》	Director	Hong Kong		
1987	Yu Pui Tsuen II 《浮世風情繪》	Director	Hong Kong		
1987	Carnal Desire aka The Locked Heart 《心鎖》	Director	Taiwan	Tomson (Hong Kong) Films Co., Ltd.	
1988	Brief Encounter 《慾燄濃情》	Director	Hong Kong	Gam Sing (Jinxing) Film Company	
1989	Erotic Nights 《夜激情》	Writer, director	Hong Kong	Mai Laan Din Ying Yau Haan Gung Shut	
1990	Temptation Summary 《三度誘惑》	Director	Hong Kong	Sam Po Film Co	
1990	L'Air Du Temps 《豪門聖女》 aka 《時代之風》	Director	Taiwan		
1991	Hidden Desire 《我為卿狂》	Director	Hong Kong	World Perfect Production Co., Ltd.	
1991	Temptation Summary II 《四度誘惑》	Director	Hong Kong	Sam Po Film Co	
1992	False Lady 《哎也女朋友》	Executive Director, Producer	Hong Kong	Sam Po Film Co	
1993	7 Days in Paris 《少女情懷總是詩》	Producer	Hong Kong		
1993	Wild at Heart 《不羈的心》	Director, producer	Hong Kong	Heung Gong Din Ying Chai Chok Gung Shut	
1994	The Sichuan Concubines 《罌粟》	Director	Hong Kong		

=== Monographs ===
- Ho, Fan (1960). 街頭攝影叢談 [Thoughts on Street Photography]. Taipei: 藝術圖書公司. OCLC 40085019.
- Ho, Fan (1972). 現代攝影欣賞 [Modern Photography]. Taipei: 藝術. OCLC 82284319.
- Ho, Fan (1982). 何藩國際大獎攝影全集 [Complete collection of Ho Fan's international award-winning photographic art]. 台北市 (Taipei): 歐語.
- Ho, Fan (June 2006). Bennette, John A. (ed.). Hong Kong Yesterday. Palo Alto/San Francisco: Modernbook Editions. ISBN 978-0-97788-283-0. "112 pages"
- Ho, Fan (April 2009). The Living Theatre. Palo Alto/San Francisco: Modernbook Editions. ISBN 978-0-98010-443-1. "176 pages"
- Ho Fan (2014). A Hong Kong Memoir. Palo Alto/San Francisco: Modernbook Editions. ISBN 978-0-9908712-0-0. "128 pages"
- Ho, Fan (June 2017). Portrait of Hong Kong [念香港人的舊] (in English and Chinese). Hong Kong: WE Press (published June 2017). p. 220. ISBN 978-988-79340-8-0.
- Ho, Fan (October 2021). Photography. My Passion. My Life [感情・感悟・感覺] (in English and Chinese). Hong Kong: WE Press. p. 200. ISBN 978-988-79341-0-3.
- Ho, Fan (July 2025). Thoughts On Street Photography [街頭攝影叢談] (in Chinese). Hong Kong: WE Press. p. 231. ISBN 978-988-79341-8-9.

== See also ==
- Ray Metzker
- László Moholy-Nagy

== Online exhibitions ==
- 1950s Hong Kong Captured In Street Photography By Fan Ho
- Wallace, Vaughn (16 July 2013). "Hong Kong Yesterday: The Pearl of the Orient in the 1950s". Lightbox (blog). Time.
- "1950s Hong Kong Captured by Fan Ho". Sotheby's. 30 May 2017.

== Documentary videos ==
- Evening with Fan Ho (July 2009) on Vimeo
- The Art of Photography: Fan Ho (21 October 2014) on YouTube
