= Alice Au =

Chinese actress from Hong Kong

- Chinese: 區燕青
- Other names: Alice Au Yin-ching, Ou Yen-Ching, Yen-Ching Ou
- Occupation: Actress
- Years active: 1967-1970

Chinese name
- Traditional Chinese: 區燕青
- Simplified Chinese: 区燕青
Transcriptions
Standard Mandarin
- Hanyu Pinyin: Ōu Yànqīng

Alice Au Yin-ching is a Chinese actress from Hong Kong. Au was active in the late 1960s.

== Career ==
In 1967, Au started her acting career in Hong Kong. Au first appeared in Terrors Over Nothing, a 1967 Cantonese martial arts film directed by Chiang Wai-Kwong. Au's last Hong Kong film was Apartment for Ladies, a 1970 Mandarin comedy film directed by Umetsugu Inoue.

== Filmography ==
=== Films ===
- 1967 Terrors Over Nothing
- 1967 The Black Killer
- 1967 The Black And The White Cats
- 1967 The Golden Cat
- 1967 Lady Black Cat Strikes Again
- 1969 Miss Fragrance
- 1970 Apartment for Ladies - Ting Lien
- 1970 Vengeance!
