= Siu-Ying Ma =

Chinese actress and opera singer (1908–1978)

- Chinese: 馬笑英
- Born: February 9, 1908
- Died: February 9, 1978 (aged 70)
- Other names: Ma Shao-Ying, Ma Siu-Ying, Ma Xiaoying
- Occupations: Actress; Cantonese opera performer
- Years active: 1947–1976
- Relatives: Ma Kam-Neong (sister)

Siu-Ying Ma (Chinese: 馬笑英) (February 9, 1908 – February 9, 1978) is a former Chinese actress and Cantonese opera performer from Hong Kong. Ma is credited with over 550 films.

== Early life ==
On February 9, 1908, Ma was born. Ma's sister was Ma Kam-Neong.

== Career ==
At age 15, Ma became a Cantonese opera performer. In 1947, Ma crossed over as an actress in Hong Kong films. Ma first appeared in Madame Yang, the Imperial Concubine (aka Beauty of Beauties), a 1947 historical drama film directed by Mok Hong-See. Ma first appeared in Cantonese opera film in Romance of the West Chamber, a 1947 historical drama Cantonese opera directed by Yeung Kung-Leung. Ma is known for her role as a shrew mother. Ma appeared as a mother in The Evil Mind (1947), The Guangzhou Adventure of the Fearless (1947), The Judge Goes to Pieces (1948), Award to the Husband But Not the Wife (1948), and Heaven Never Lets the Kind-Hearted Down (1954). Ma's last film was Love Cross-Road, a 1976 drama film directed by Wong Wa-Kei. Ma is credited with over 550 films.

== Filmography ==
=== Films ===
This is a partial list of film.

- 1947 A Wealthy Family
- 1947 Madame Yang, the Imperial Concubine (aka Beauty of Beauties)
- 1947 The Evil Mind
- 1947 The Guangzhou Adventure of the Fearless
- 1947 Romance of the West Chamber
- 1948 The Judge Goes to Pieces
- 1948 Award to the Husband But Not the Wife
- 1951 Mother and Son in Grief – Matriarch Wong
- 1954 Heaven Never Lets the Kind-Hearted Down
- 1954 Spring's Flight
- 1956 Pleasure Daughter
- 1960 Fortune
- 1960 Second Spring – Mother-in-law
- 1960 The Stubborn Generations - Madam Lee
- 1964 The Greatest Love Affair on Earth
- 1967 Story of a Discharged Prisoner - Mother
- 1976 Love Cross-Road

=== Television series ===
- 1977 A House is Not a Home

== Personal life ==
On February 9, 1978, Ma died.
