= The Cave of the Silken Web (1967 film) =

1967 British Hong Kong film by Ho Meng Hua

Cave of the Silken Web
- Poster for 1967 film
- Directed by: Ho Meng Hua
- Screenplay by: Cheng Kang
- Based on: Journey to the West by Wu Cheng'en
- Produced by: Run Run Shaw
- Starring: Ho Fan; Angela Yu Chien
- Cinematography: Lin Kuo-Hsiang
- Edited by: Chiang Hsing-lung
- Music by: Wang Fu-ling
- Production company: Shaw Brothers Studio
- Release date: 31 July 1967 (Hong Kong)
- Running time: 82 minutes
- Country: British Hong Kong
- Languages: Mandarin; Cantonese

The Cave of the Silken Web (Chinese: 盤絲洞) is a 1967 film directed by Ho Meng Hua and produced by Shaw Brothers Studio in Hong Kong. The film is based on an episode from the 16th-century classic Chinese novel Journey to the West.

The film is the third of a series of four films based on Journey to the West. The others are Monkey Goes West (1966), Princess Iron Fan (1966) and The Land of Many Perfumes (1968).

== Cast ==
- Tien Shun as Sha Wujing, Monk Sandy
- Pang Pang - Pigsy
- Liu Liang Hua as Elder Sister, Gold spider
- Angela Yu Chien as Third sister, Red Spider
- Shen Yi - Green spider
- Helen Ma - Purple spider
- Shirley Wong Sa-Lee - Brown spider
- Tien Meng - Silver spider
- Yau Ching - Blue spider
- Tang Ti - Centipede Goblin
- Shum Lo - Earth Lord
- Ng Wai - Earth Mistress
- Ho Fan as Tang Sanzang

== See also ==
- The Cave of the Silken Web (1927 film)
