= Kwun-Lai Ng =

Chinese actress and opera singer (1934–2018)

- Chinese: 吳君麗
- Born: January 29, 1934; Shanghai, China
- Died: September 26, 2018 (aged 84); Hong Kong
- Other names: Kwanlai Ng, Ng Kwan-Lai, Ng Kwun-Lai, Wu Jun-Li
- Occupations: Actress; Cantonese opera singer
- Years active: 1954–1967
- Known for: Lead Actress of Lai Sing Opera Troupe

Kwun-Lai Ng (Chinese: 吳君麗) (1934–2018) was a former Chinese actress and Cantonese opera singer from Hong Kong. Ng was credited with over 150 films.

== Early life ==
On January 29, 1934, Ng was born in Shanghai, China.

== Education ==
Ng studied at Yinzizhong Music Conservatoire and Xiangjiang Cantonese Opera Institute.

== Career ==
In 1954, Ng established A Branch of Troupe, a Chinese opera group. In 1955, Ng founded the Lai Sing Opera Troupe. Ng is known for her role as a fa dan in Cantonese opera. Ng was a member of opera troupes including Lai Sing Opera Troupe, Fei Fan Heung Opera Troupe and Chung Sun Sing Opera Troupe. In 1955, Ng crossed over as an actress in Hong Kong films. Ng first appeared in The Model and the Car with Yam Kim-fai and Bak Sheut-sin, a 1955 Comedy Cantonese opera film directed by Chan Pei. In 1967, Ng appeared in 10 films. Ng's last film was The Full Moon, a 1967 Drama Film directed by Kwan Chi-Kin. In 1967, Ng retired from the film industry. Ng is credited with over 150 films.

== Repertoire ==
1. The Blessings of the Moon (aka Two Immortals at the Pavilion of the Moon) opposite Ho Fei-fan
2. The Reunion by a White Hare (aka Fete of the White Hare)
3. Presenting a Sword at Hundred-Flower Pavilion
4. The Story of Chu Pin's Loyalty to the Sung Dynasty
5. The Lady’s Sash opposite Mak Bing-wing
6. How Liang Hongyu's War Drum Caused the Jin Army to Retreat (Stage debut that put her on the map.)

== Filmography ==
=== Films ===
This is a partial list of films.

- 1955 The Model and the Car
- 1956 How Liang Hongyu's War Drum Caused the Jin Army to Retreat (aka How Leung Hung-Yuk's War Drum Caused the Jin Troops to Retreat)
- 1957 The Beauty's Grave (aka The Lady's Sash)
- 1958 Two Immortals at the Pavilion of the Moon
- 1958 Substituting a Racoon for the Prince
- 1959 Fete of the White Hare
- 1960 Last Minute - Luk Yin-Chi
- 1967 A Gifted Scholar and a Beautiful Maid
- 1967 The Long Journey Home - Lo Hoi York
- 1967 Madame Lee Sze-Sze - Madame Lee Sze-Sze
- 1967 Romance Across the Miles - Lui Suk-Ying
- 1967 Who Should Be the Commander-in-Chief?
- 1967 Terrors Over Nothing
- 1967 Uproar in Jade Hall - Princess Jasper Flower
- 1967 The Full Moon

== Personal life ==
On September 26, 2018, Ng died in Hong Kong.
