= Wu Pang =

Hong Kong-Chinese filmmaker

- Chinese: 胡鵬
- Born: 1909; Shanghai, Republic of China
- Died: 2000 (aged 90–91); Hong Kong
- Other names: Hu Peng, Woo Paang
- Occupations: Film director, producer, production manager, actor, planner, writer
- Known for: Co-founder of the Yong Yao Film Company.

Wu Pang (Chinese: 胡鵬) (1909–2000) was a Hong Kong Chinese director, producer, production manager, actor, movie planner, writer and the co-founder of the Yong Yao Film Company.

== Early life ==
On December 21, 1909, Wu was born in Shanghai, Republic of China.

== Career ==
Wu and producer Zhenjiang Yongyao started making films in 1938. At the age of 30, Wu began making films of folk hero Wong Fei Hung which starred actor and martial artist Kwan Tak-hing, also known as Kwan Te-hsing by film producer Raymond Chow Man Wai. Over the course of his life, Wu directed nearly 200 movies and received the Lifetime Achievement Awards by the Hong Kong Film Critics' Association in 1999.

== Books ==
Wu also published a book, Wong Fei Hung and I, about his extensive work on the subject.

== Filmography ==
=== Films ===
This is a partial list of films.

- 1938 A Night of Romance, A Lifetime of Regret
- 1948 Fishing Village in the War
- 1949 The Story of Wong Fei-Hung (Part 1)
- 1950 How Shaolin Monastery Was Reduced to Ashes
- 1955 Story of Iron Monkey (Grand Finale)
- 1956 Iron-Palm Versus Eagle-Claw
- 1956 How Wong Fei-hung Subdued the Two Tigers
- 1957 How Wong Fei-Hung Fought a Bloody Battle in the Spinster's Home
- 1959 Wong Fei-Hung on Rainbow Bridge
- 1960 Two Orphans Conquered the Dragon at Tianshan
- 1961 Decisive Battle at Nan Ling Temple
- 1961 How Wong Fei-Hung Smashed the Five Tigers
- 1964 Sword of the Buddha's Warrior
- 1969 The Flying Swordgirl
- 1980 Luckiest Trio

== Awards ==
- 1999 Lifetime Achievement Award. Presented by Hong Kong Film Critics’ Association.
- Star. Avenue of Stars. Tsim Sha Tsui waterfront in Hong Kong.

== Personal life ==
In 1936, at age 27, Wu moved to Hong Kong. In 2000, Wu died in the Hong Kong Health Centre at the age of 91.

== See also ==
- Wong Fei Hung Filmography
- Avenue of Stars, Hong Kong
