= Yuk-Yi Yung =

Chinese actress from Hong Kong (born 1918)

- Chinese: 容玉意
- Born: 1918; Shanghai, China
- Other names: Yung Yuk-Yi, Yung Yuk-Yee, Rong Yuyi, Rong Yu-Yi, Yung Yuk-I
- Occupation: Actress
- Years active: 1938–1975
- Relatives: Siu-Yi Yung (sister)

Yuk-Yi Yung (Chinese: 容玉意, born 1918) is a Chinese-born former actress based in Hong Kong. Yung is credited with over 310 films.

== Early life ==
In 1918, Yung was born in Shanghai, China. Yung's sister was Siu-Yi Yung.

== Career ==
Yung and her sister joined Plum Blossom Song and Dance Troupe. In 1938, Yung became an actress with Nanyang Film Company in Hong Kong. Yung first appeared as Kam Ching in The Purple Cups, a 1938 film directed by Hou Yao. Yung appeared in martial arts films such as The Adventures of Fang Shiyu (Part 2) (1939), Swordswoman Red Butterfly (1939), The White Lotus Menace (1939), The Eunuch (1971), and Tornado of Pearl River (1974). Yung also appeared in drama films and comedy films. Yung rarely appeared in films with her sister Siu-Yi Yung except for Sima Fu's Encounter with the Honey Gang, a 1949 thriller film directed by Hung Suk-Wan, and The Beau, a 1964 film directed by Chun Kim. Yung's last film was Carry on Con Men, a 1975 comedy film directed by Wong Fung. Yung is credited with over 310 films.

== Filmography ==
=== Films ===
This is a partial list of films.

- 1938 The Purple Cups - Kam Ching
- 1939 The Adventures of Fang Shiyu (Part 2)
- 1939 Swordswoman Red Butterfly
- 1939 The White Lotus Menace
- 1941 Chaos in the Universe
- 1942 The Rich House - Sally
- 1947 The Distressed Lover
- 1948 Woman's Heart - Ho So-Hing
- 1949 Sima Fu's Encounter with the Honey Gang
- 1960 Ten Schoolgirls - Second Mrs. Lee
- 1962 The Quick-witted Woman Detective (aka A Detective's Affair) - Ah Sam
- 1964 The Beau
- 1965 The Six-fingered Lord of the Lute (Part 1)
- 1967 The Brave Girl
- 1967 Broadcast Queen
- 1967 Family Man
- 1967 First Love - Mrs. Wong
- 1967 The Great Lover
- 1967 Prodigal in Distress
- 1970 The Heart-Stealer - Mother Tien
- 1970 The Young Girl Dares Not Homeward (aka Girl Wanders Around) - Jo Lei's mother
- 1970 Yesterday, Today, Tomorrow
- 1971 The Eunuch
- 1974 Tornado of Pearl River - Brothel madam
- 1975 Carry on Con Men - Zhang Yunan's mother-in-law
