= Ying Ting =

Chinese actress from Hong Kong (born 1938)

- Chinese: 丁瑩
- Born: August 23, 1938 (age 88); Hong Kong
- Other name: Ting Ying
- Occupation: Actress
- Years active: 1955–1969

Ying Ting (b. August 23, 1938 Hong Kong) (Chinese: 丁瑩) is a Chinese actress from Hong Kong. Ting is credited with over 75 films.

== Career ==
In 1955, Ting began her film career with the Liberty Film Company release of Queen of the Stage, a 1955 Comedy directed by Lee Ying-yuen. Ting was active in 1950's and 1960's and many leading roles in Cantonese dialect films. Ting played Yeung Wai-Fung in Factory Queen (aka Queen of the Factory; Three Love Affairs), a 1963 Comedy film directed by Mok Hong-see, and Leung Chui-Chun in Dim-Sum Queen (aka Queen of Tea House), a 1965 Romantic Comedy directed by Mok Hong-see. From 1959 to 1966, Ting was the only contracted female artist of Lan Kwong Film Company, where she was a leading actress for many films directed by Mok Hong-see. In the late 1960s, Ting also appeared in Mandarin dialect films such as Tigress is Coming, a 1968 martial arts film directed by Wu Pang. Ting's last Hong Kong film as a lead was Man Ghost Fox, a 1969 Fantasy Ghost film directed by Chou Hsu-chiang.

== Filmography ==
=== Films ===
This is a partial list of films.

- 1955 Queen of the Stage (Chinese: 銀燈照玉人)
- 1960 Three Females - Leung Kit-Fong
- 1961 Woman's Affairs - Chui Lai-Ping
- 1962 Secrets Between Husband and Wife (aka Happy Couples)
- 1963 Factory Queen (aka Queen of the Factory; Three Love Affairs) (Chinese: 工廠皇后) - Yeung Wai-Fung
- 1965 Dim-Sum Queen (aka Queen of Tea House) (Chinese: 點心皇后) - Leung Chui-Chun
- 1966 The International Secret Agents (Chinese: 國際女間諜) - Maria
- 1967 Tender Tears - Chiu Siu-Wan
- 1967 Three Women in a Factory - Yam Kim-Ying
- 1968 Tigress is Coming
- 1969 Man Ghost Fox
