= Hui Ying-Ying =

Chinese actress from Hong Kong

- Chinese: 許瑩英
- Born: 1928
- Died: 1993 (aged 64–65); Singapore
- Other names: Hsu Yung-Ying, Hsu Yin-Ying, Xu Ying-Ying
- Occupation: Actress
- Years active: 1952–1993

Ying-Ying Hui (1928-1993) (Chinese: 許瑩英) is a former Chinese actress from Hong Kong. Hui is credited with over 310 films.

== Career ==
In 1952, Hui became a Chinese actress in Hong Kong films. Hui first appeared in A Bright Future, a 1952 comedy and Cantonese opera directed by Chun Kim. Hui appeared in Cantonese opera, drama, comedy, and martial arts films. In Drama, Hui appeared in films such as A Mother's Tears (1953) and Spring's Flight (1954). In Cantonese opera, Hui appeared in films such as General Kwan Seduced by Diaochan Under Moonlight (aka Kwan-Ti, God of War)(1956) and as Mu-Lan's elder sister in Hua Mulan, the Girl Who Went to War (1957). In martial arts films, Hui appeared in films such as Seven Swordsman Leave Tianshan (1959), Green Dragon Sword (1961), Blood No. 1 (aka The Ring of Spies)(1965), and The Dead and the Deadly (1982). In comedy, Hui appeared in films such as Chicken and Duck Talk (1988) and How to Be a Millionaire (aka How to Be a Billionaire Without Really Trying) (1989). Hui's last film was All's Well End's Well, Too, a 1993 comedy film directed by Clifton Ko Chi-Sum. Hui is credited with over 310 films.

== Filmography ==
=== Films ===
This is a partial list of films.

- 1952 A Bright Future
- 1953 A Mother's Tears
- 1954 Spring's Flight - Maid
- 1956 General Kwan Seduced by Diaochan Under Moonlight (aka Kwan-Ti, God of War)
- 1957 Hua Mulan, the Girl Who Went to War - Mu-Lan's elder sister
- 1959 Seven Swordsman Leave Tianshan
- 1961 Green Dragon Sword
- 1963 The Face of Fear (aka The Priceless Souvenir)
- 1965 Blood No. 1 (aka The Ring of Spies)
- 1967 A Girl's Secret
- 1967 Bunny Girl - Second daughter-in-law
- 1967 Finding a Wife in a Blind Way - Lucy
- 1967 Rocambole
- 1967 The Story of a Discharged Prisoner - Ah Hon's wife
- 1970 Yesterday, Today, Tomorrow
- 1981 Wedding Bells, Wedding Belles
- 1982 The Dead and the Deadly
- 1982 Tiger Killer
- 1982 Wild Cherry
- 1988 Chicken and Duck Talk - Maria
- 1989 How to Be a Millionaire (aka How to Be a Billionaire Without Really Trying)

== Personal life ==
Hui had three children. In 1993, Hui died in Singapore.
