= Wong Hok-Sing =

Chinese opera performer, film director, writer and actor

- Chinese: 黃鶴聲
- Born: 1913; Guangdong, China
- Died: 1994 (aged 80–81)
- Other names: Wong Gam-Yan, Wong Kam-Yan, Hok-Sing Wong
- Occupations: Actor; Cantonese opera performer; film director
- Years active: 1939–1970

Wong Hok-Sing (1913–1994) is a former Cantonese opera performer, actor, screenwriter and film director from Hong Kong in 1950s and 1960s. Wong is credited with over 75 films as an actor, over 200 films as a director, and over 70 films as a writer.

== Early life ==
In 1913, Wong was born in Guangdong, China.

== Career ==
Wong gained fame working for the Guangdong Professional Union for Cantonese Opera Performers, often appearing in troupes led by the likes of Sit Kok-sin and Ma Si-tsang. While touring the US he became interested in filmmaking, although had made his debut as a film actor in 1940 in General Di Qing. He began working for the Grandview Film Company, producing films such as White Powder and Neon Lights in 1947. Among his directed films are Seven Phoenixes (1961), Romance of the Phoenix Chamber (1962) and The Pitiless Sword (1964). Wong is known as one of the "Ten Brothers", a group of 10 Cantonese film directors in Hong Kong. Wong is credited with over 75 films as an actor, over 200 films as a director, and over 70 films as a writer.

== Filmography ==
=== Films ===
This is a partial list of films.

- 1939 Breaking Through the Bronze Net
- 1940 The Marrying General – Dik Ching
- 1947 White Powder and Neon Lights – Screenwriter. Debut film Director.
- 1960 Lady Racketeer
- 1961 Seven Phoenixes (aka Golden Phoenix vs. the Dragon) – Director.
- 1962 Romance of the Phoenix Chamber (aka The Princess in Distress) – Director.
- 1967 A Gifted Scholar and a Beautiful Maid (aka Merry Maid) – Director.
- 1967 Uproar in Jade Hall – Director.
