= Lily Ho (actress) =

Chinese actress from Hong Kong

- Chinese: 何莉莉
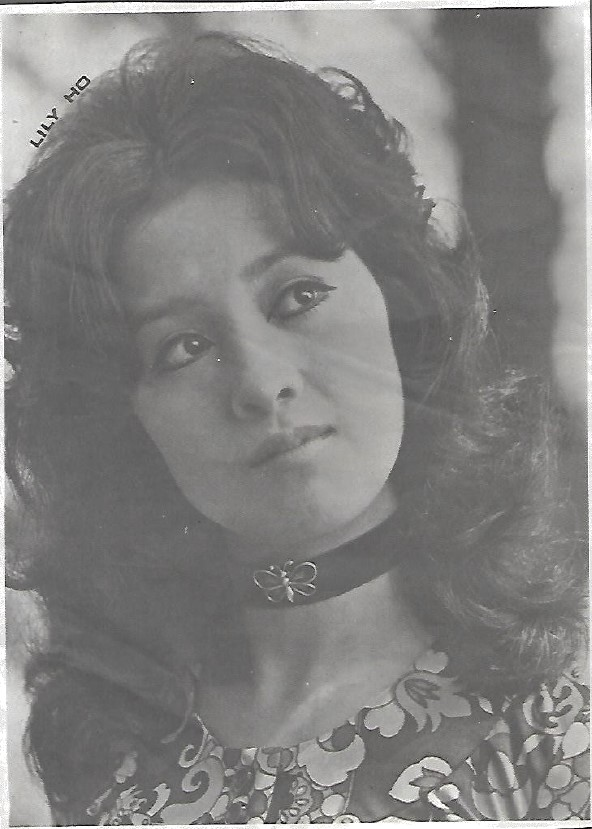
- Ho in alternative indonesian magazine Aktuil
- Other names: Lily Ho Lei-Lei, Lily Ho Li Li, Lily Chao
- Occupation: Actress
- Years active: 1963–1972
- Spouse: George Chao (m. 1972; died 2016)
- Children: 4

Lily Ho (Chinese: 何莉莉) is a Chinese/Taiwanese actress (Note: Other sources mention 1946 or 1947 as her year of birth in Nanjing (continental China) to Chinese parents; but all sources mention early childhood in Taiwan and most of them describe Ho as "from Taiwan".) who worked mostly in Hong Kong films. She is known for playing the lead roles in various Shaw Brothers productions. Ho is known for the 1966 The Knight Of Knights and her role as Ainu, a lesbian, in Intimate Confessions of a Chinese Courtesan, a 1972 adult martial arts film.

== Life and career ==
=== Early life ===
Ho was born in 1946 and grew up in Taiwan. Ho graduated from The Girl's Middle School in Taiwan.

=== Career ===
At age 16, Ho began her acting career in Taiwan. In 1963, Ho was discovered by Yuan Chiu-feng, a director who cast her for Songfest in Taiwan. In 1965, Ho became a Shaw Brothers actress in Hong Kong. Ho is known for 1966 The Knight Of Knights, where she appeared partially nude. Ho played a male role in 1972 in The Fourteen Amazons. Ho also is known for her role as Ainu, a lesbian, in Intimate Confessions of a Chinese Courtesan, a 1972 adult martial arts film directed by Chor Yuen. Ho is known as one of the "12 Golden Hairpins".

=== Personal life ===
In 1972, Ho married George Chao Tse Kwong (died 2016), a Hong Kong shipping tycoon and youngest son in a prominent Hong Kong family. They had four children. Eldest daughter Sabrina Chao is currently President of Baltic and International Maritime Council. Ho's brother-in-law is Cecil Chao.

== Filmography ==
- 1963 (1964, 1965) Song Fest (aka Songfest) - Ying Hua
- 1965 Song of Orchid Island - Bai Da-Na
- 1966 The Monkey Goes West - Skeleton Demon
- 1966 Till the End of Time - Huang I-Hua
- 1966 The Knight of Knights - Lin Hong Yu
- 1966 Auntie Lan
- 1966 Princess Iron Fan
- 1967 Angel With The Iron Fists - Luo Na, Ai Si, Agent 009
- 1967 Hong Kong Nocturne - Chia Tsui Tsui
- 1967 The Sword and the Lute
- 1967 Inter-Pol
- 1967 That Tender Age
- 1967 My Dreamboat - Tang Ke Shin
- 1967 King Drummer
- 1968 The Silver Fox
- 1968 Angel Strikes Again
- 1968 The Brain-Stealers
- 1968 Hong Kong Rhapsody - Herself
- 1969 The Singing Thief
- 1969 The Millionaire Chase
- 1969 Tropical Interlude
- 1970 The Golden Knight
- 1970 The Orchid
- 1970 A Time for Love
- 1971 The Venus' Tear Diamond
- 1971 The Jade Faced Assassin
- 1971 The Lady Professional
- 1971 We Love Millionaires
- 1971 Lady with a Sword - Feng Fei Fei
- 1972 The Water Margin (Chinese: 水滸傳)
- 1972 The Casino (Chinese: 吉祥賭坊) - Miss Cui
- 1972 Trilogy of Swordsmanship
- 1972 Of Wives and Mistresses
- 1972 Intimate Confessions of a Chinese Courtesan (Chinese: 愛奴) - Ainu
- 1972 The 14 Amazons (Chinese: 十四女英豪) - Yang Wen Kuan
- 1972 The Warlord
- 1972 Flower in the Rain
- 1973 Facets of Love
- 1973 River of Fury
- 1973 The House of 72 Tenants
- 1974 Sex, Love and Hate
- 1974 Five Tough Guys
- 1975 All Men Are Brothers
- 1983 The Lost Generation

== Awards ==
- 1973 Asian Film Festival: Outstanding Lead Female Performance Award for her role in The 14 Amazons
