= Yan Ruisheng =

1921 Chinese silent film by Ren Pengnian

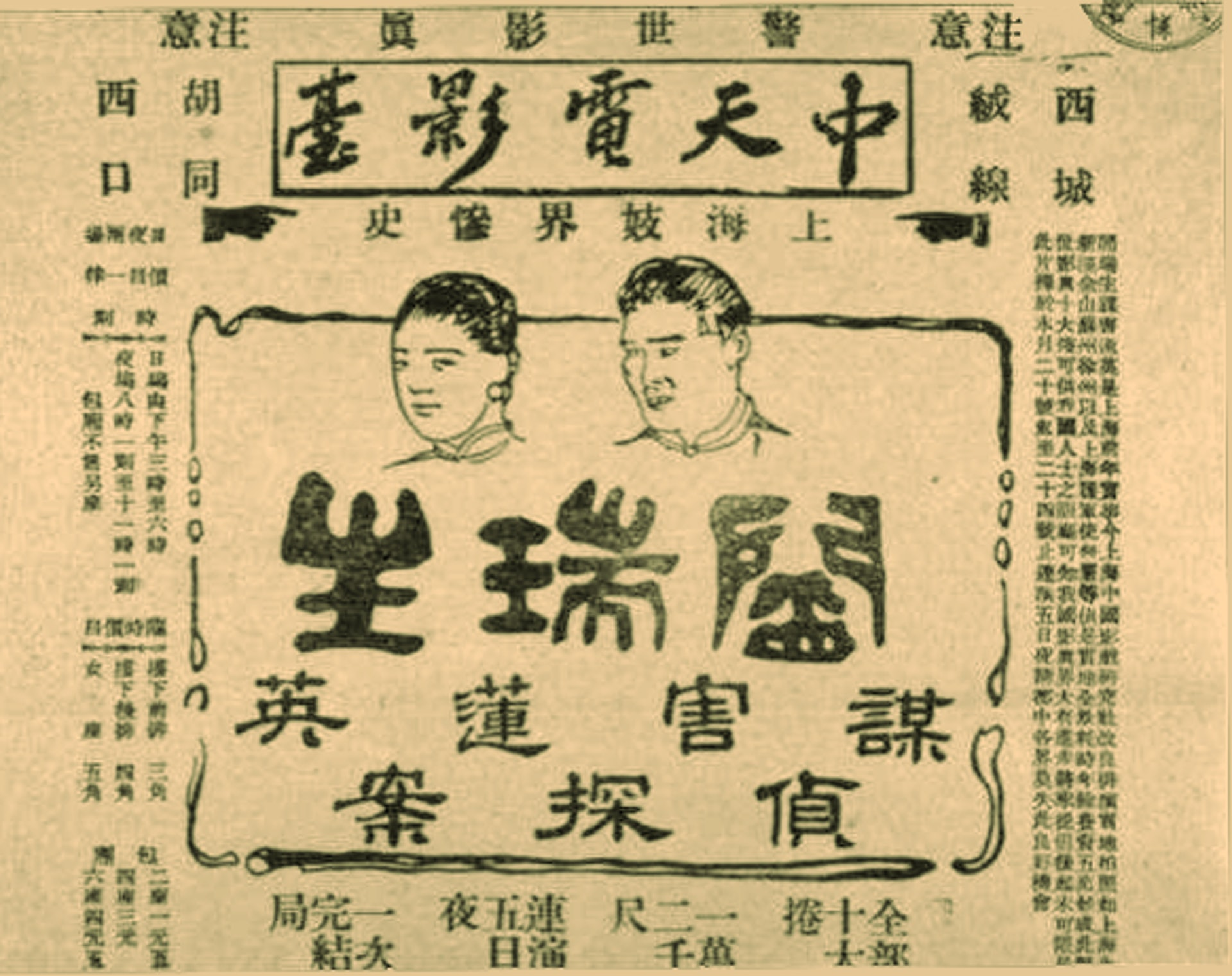
- Advertisement
- Traditional Chinese: 閻瑞生
- Simplified Chinese: 阎瑞生
Transcriptions
Standard Mandarin
- Hanyu Pinyin: Yán Ruìshēng
- Wade–Giles: Yen^{2} Jui^{4}-sheng^{1}
- Directed by: Ren Pengnian
- Written by: Yang Xiaozhong
- Based on: Murder of Wang Lianying
- Starring: Chen Shouzhi; Wang Caiyun
- Cinematography: Liao Enshou
- Production company: Chinese Cinema Study Society
- Release date: 1 July 1921
- Running time: 10 reels (approx. 100 to 120 minutes)
- Country: China
- Language: Silent

Yan Ruisheng (traditional Chinese: 閻瑞生; simplified Chinese: 阎瑞生; pinyin: Yán Ruìshēng) is a 1921 Chinese silent film directed by Ren Pengnian and starring Chen Shouzi and Wang Caiyun. A docudrama based on the murder of Wang Lianying the previous year, it follows a young man named Yan Ruisheng who kills a courtesan to steal her jewellery. When the crime is discovered, he and his accomplices flee. Yan is captured in Xuzhou and returned to Shanghai, where he is executed.

China's first full-length feature film, Yan Ruisheng was produced as domestic short films were becoming increasingly common. A collaborative project of the Chinese Cinema Study Society, the film extensively used the resources of the Commercial Press's filmmaking division. It emphasized accuracy to real life in its casting and setting; the stars were chosen based on their physical resemblance to those involved, while extensive use of location shooting allowed scenes to be set in places associated with the case.

Despite the generally poor box-office performance of earlier Chinese-made films, Yan Ruisheng was a commercial success upon release. Critical reception of its technical aspects was positive; however, the subject matter was challenged and the film faced several calls for banning. The success of Yan Ruisheng stimulated the rise of the domestic film industry even as it contributed to the rise of film censorship in China. The film is thought to be lost.

== Plot ==
Yan Ruisheng, having wasted his money on gambling, fine food, and prostitutes, decides to rob the courtesan Wang Lianying. He travels to her workplace and invites her and another woman, Xiaolin Daiyu, to join him. After Xiaolin declines, Yan and Wang take a drive outside Shanghai, where Yan's friends Wu Chunfang and Fang Rishan are waiting. Although Wang begs for her life, the men kill her to avoid leaving a witness, then steal her jewellery and dump her body in a field. Back in Shanghai, the brothel manager realizes that Wang is missing. Learning from Xiaolin that the missing courtesan had gone with Yan, the madam contacts the police; they find the body shortly afterwards. Yan flees to Xuzhou, but is recognized, arrested, and sent back to Shanghai. Together with Wu and Fang, also captured outside Shanghai, he is found guilty of the murder and executed in Shanghai.

== Background ==
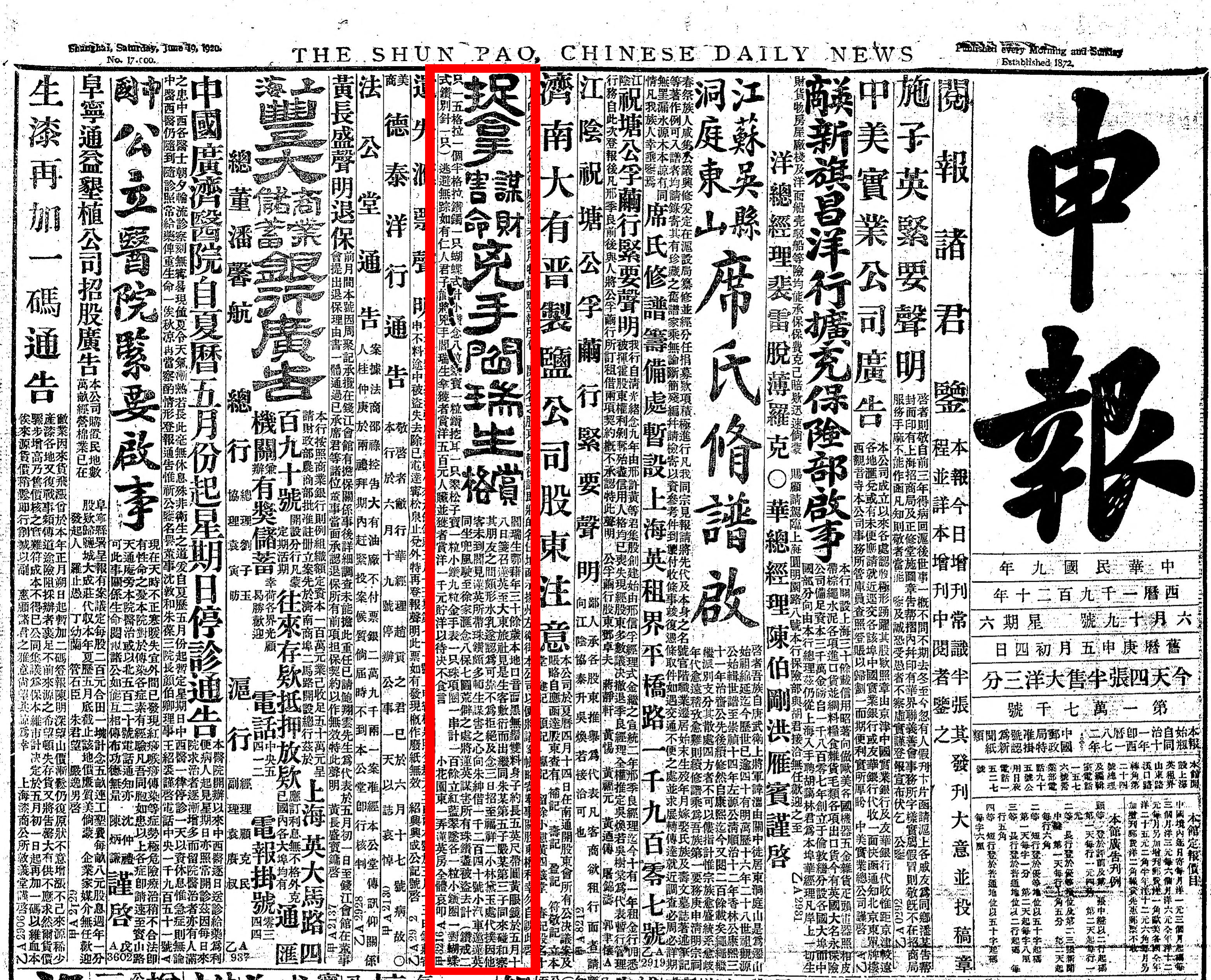
Front page of the Shen Bao, 19 June 1920, offering a reward for the capture of Yan Ruisheng. His murder of Wang Lianying captured the imagination of contemporary Shanghai society.

Film was introduced to China in 1896, when it was screened as part of a variety show in Shanghai. Over subsequent decades, numerous films imported from the West – at first, one-reel works with little plot but later expanding to include feature-length films – were screened. In 1905, Fengtai Photographic Studio produced Dingjun Mountain, a short film depicting Tan Xinpei in a Peking opera. This was the first Chinese-produced film. Through the 1910s, several film studios were established. Working with Zhang Shichuan, (Note: Zhang had been working as a comprador for an advertising agency. He and the dramatist Zheng Zhengqiu subsequently co-established several film companies, including Mingxing – one of the largest film production houses in the Republic of China.) the American Benjamin Brodsky established the Asia Film Company, which produced documentaries as well as The Difficult Couple (1913) – the first Chinese-made short fiction film. Other studios were established in Hong Kong and Shanghai, and toward the late 1910s the production of short films was increasing. Though audience reactions were initially tepid, the new medium – known under such terms as "electric shadowplay" (電光影戯; 电光影戏) – became increasingly popular through the 1910s. By 1926, more than a hundred cinemas had been opened throughout China, Hong Kong, and Taiwan.

Yan Ruisheng was based on a 1920 murder case in Shanghai wherein a university-educated youth named Yan Ruisheng had killed Wang Lianying, a courtesan known as the "Prime Minister of Flower Country". (Note: In China, the term flower (花) has a long history as a euphemism for courtesans. Prostitution was legal in China, and in Shanghai's international settlements courtesans paid a "flower tax" through the 1860s. The highest class courtesans entertained their clients not only with sexual services but also with their musical prowess. According to the Shanghai Chronicles, in 1915 almost 9,800 women were active as prostitutes in the Shanghai International Settlement (Shanghai Chronicles 2008). In the 1920s, authorities in the settlement closed one-fifth of the area's brothels, with plans to eliminate the remainder by 1925 (Chen 2021).) The case immediately captured the public interest, as did Yan's confession that the idea for the murder came from American cinema. Newspaper coverage extended for months, with the 5,000-word guilty verdict and accompanying confessions serialized in the Xinwen Bao newspaper from 25 November to 8 December 1920; the public execution of Yan drew an audience of thousands. The story was quickly adapted to the stage, including as spoken-word dramas, Peking operas, and various local forms of theatre.

== Production ==
Production of Yan Ruisheng was handled by the Chinese Cinema Study Society (CCSS), a recently established group of students that also published an illustrated periodical titled The Motion Picture Review (影戏杂志). (Note: This magazine, which only lasted three issues, did not identify its editorial board. Contents focused primarily on Western imports and included several photographs of Charlie Chaplin, though discussion of the emerging cinema of Japan was also found (Chen 2021).) Although the production process was primarily collaborative, several individuals were identified as fulfilling specific roles. Ren Pengnian was credited as director, while Yang Xiaozhong was attributed for the script and Liao Enshou for cinematography. Also involved were society members Xu Xinfu and Gu Kenfu. (Note: As noted by Chen (2021), sources disagree as to the exact composition of the CCSS. Yang Xiaozhong identified Chen Shouzhi, Shi Binyuan, and Shao Peng as leading members. Lu Jie described the group as having been established by Gu Kenfu before being joined by himself, Shi Binyuan, Xu Xinfu, and Chen Shouzhi; all of these students contributed to The Motion Picture Review.) In its production announcement, CCSS claimed that it intended to disrupt foreign films' monopoly over Chinese audiences, transform the screen portrayal of the Chinese, and produce films for export; a desire to stimulate investment in film was noted in post-release coverage.

The filmmakers initially considered hiring cast members from existing stage productions, but ultimately decided to cast amateurs. CCSS member Chen Shouzhi was cast in the lead role due to his physical resemblance to Yan Ruisheng; having been one of Yan's friends, he also knew the man's mannerisms. For the victim Wang Lianying, a retired courtesan named Wang Caiyun was hired; she had also had previous theatrical experience. As earlier films had used male actors to portray women, she has been identified as the first woman to act in a mainland Chinese film production. (Note: Wang was not the first woman to act in a Chinese film production. Yan Shanshan, the wife of Lai Man-Wai, had played a servant girl in her husband's 1913 short film Zhuangzi Tests His Wife (Zhang 2005, p. 38). This film was not produced in Shanghai, but in British Hong Kong, which had more liberal policies that may have facilitated her screen appearance (Selbo 2015, p. 55).) A third role, the supporting antagonist Wu Chunfeng, was played by Shao Peng. Yan's friend Zhu Zhijia, whose car had been used in the murder, offered to play himself. The film featured numerous extras, including uniformed guardsmen who were involved in the execution scene.

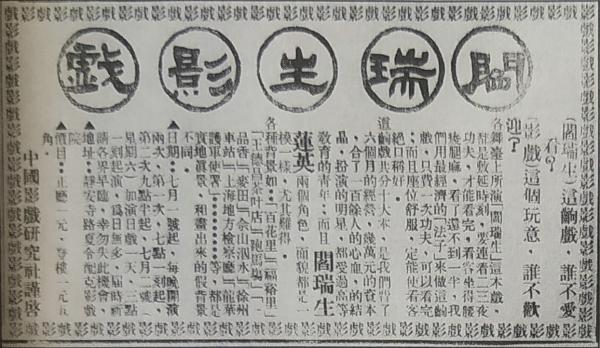
The makers of Yan Ruisheng emphasized verisimilitude, advertising that the cast looked exactly the same as their characters' real-life counterparts.

Funds for the production – advertised as tens of thousands of yuan – were borrowed, and equipment and crew were loaned from the filmmaking division of the Commercial Press, the largest publishing house in China. (Note: The Commercial Press' filmmaking division produced some forty-eight films, mostly documentaries, between 1917 and 1924. None are known to have survived, the warehouse having been destroyed during the Shanghai incident of 1932 (Qian 2024, p. 52).) The Commercial Press's filmmaking division also made its indoor studio available to the crew. Located on the glass-roofed fourth floor of the company's headquarters, the venue was lit by mercury-vapor lamps that allowed for shooting at night. Despite the availability of such facilities, advertisements emphasized the extensive use of location shooting, name-dropping the Fuyuli, Huileli, and Juanli brothels as well as the Helinchun Teahouse.

When making Yan Ruisheng, the filmmakers emphasized a high level of verisimilitude. (Note: Such an emphasis on realism was thought to draw audiences; a similar approach was used for Lee Tit's House Number Sixty-Six (1936) fifteen years later (Troost 2023, p. 54).) In this, they were aided by the extensive coverage of the court case and their own personal familiarity with the culprit. Some scenes were shot at the same locations where the events had occurred, or at venues frequented by those involved, and the car used in the film was the same one in which Yan had driven Wang. Also featured in the film were the Xuzhou railway station, the Shanghai Garrison Command, and the execution grounds, as well as scenes of horse racing.

The production of Yan Ruisheng was announced in the Shen Bao on 6 April 1921, with principal photography having been completed and post-production in progress. Coverage appeared in several subsequent issues of the newspaper, and later advertising material explained that the film had been completed over the course of six months. As released, it was ten reels in length (approx. 100 to 120 minutes total), with one advertisement describing this as much more economical than the two- or three-night performances of existing stage versions. This silent film was interspersed with intertitles in vernacular Chinese by Yang Xiaozhong.

== Release and reception ==
Yan Ruisheng premiered on 1 July 1921 at the Olympic Theatre in Shanghai's international settlement. One of the largest cinemas in Shanghai, the Olympic – owned by Spanish entrepreneur Antonio Ramos – was normally used for first-run releases of Hollywood and French imports. The Chinese Cinema Study Society rented the theatre at 200 yuan (¥19,480 in 2019) (Note: The yuan (symbol: ¥) is the basic unit of Chinese currency. Originally used to describe the Spanish dollar, the definition expanded to include various forms of dollar; it also provides the etymology for the Japanese yen and the Korean won. The symbol has remained in use to denote units of the renminbi, the currency of the People's Republic of China since 1949 (Mulvey 2010). For more detail on the evolution of currency in the Republic of China, see Yuan (currency)#Republican era.) per day, which excluded the cost of advertising. Given the general underperformance of Chinese films at the time, the extravagance of the release could have been disastrous.

However, Yan Ruisheng was an immediate commercial success. Despite high ticket prices, ranging from one to twenty yuan (equivalent to ¥98 to ¥1,948 in 2019), (Note: For comparison, in 1920s Shanghai, the average monthly expenses for an unmarried unskilled worker was 11.85 yuan; an unmarried skilled worker in the same period averaged 19.26 yuan per month in expenses (Xu 2000, p. 61).) screenings were sold out. The most expensive balcony seats were reserved prior to the premiere, and per-day revenues reached 1,300 yuan (¥127,000 in 2019). Total profits for the one-week screening were reported at 4,000 yuan (¥390,000 in 2019). This success challenged the contemporary belief that domestically produced films were unprofitable, and the film toured China extensively in subsequent weeks. By mid-July it had been shown in Beijing, Tianjin, and Hankou. It was screened in Taiwan in 1925.

In its technical achievements, the film was praised. Critics highlighted the film's cohesion and realism, with some comparing it positively to imported films. Reviewing for the Shen Bao, Mu Gong wrote:

The arrangement is much like that of Western film, but incomparable to the chaos of the stage. It could not have been expected that the Chinese people would achieve this level of photography. [...] As for the plot, it is compact, and the male and female actors play their roles well. (Note: Original: ｢一切布置均与西片相仿，殊与各舞台之乱七八糟者不可同日而语，国人自摄影片，竟能臻此境界，殊出意料之外。[...] 至于此剧中之情节，编制尚紧凑，演男女各员均能适如其分。｣. Original source: Mu Gong (木公) (11 July 1921). 顾影闲评 [Shadowplay Reviews]. Shen Bao (in Chinese). pp. 13, 18.)

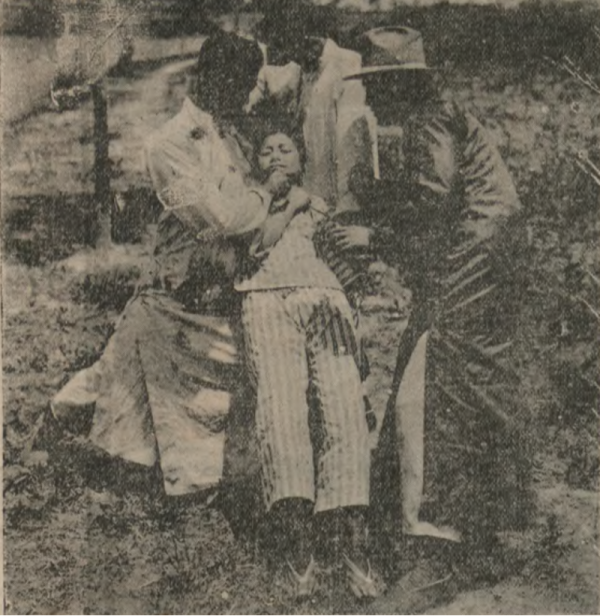
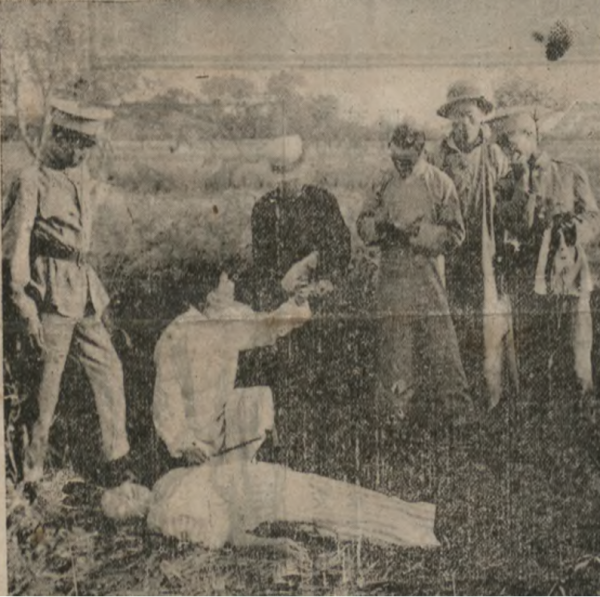
Scenes from Yan Ruisheng depicting the murder and autopsy of Wang Lianying; the film was criticized for its focus on the killing of a courtesan.

At the same time, critics decried Yan Ruisheng's focus on a murderer and a prostitute. Some urged that the film not be screened internationally, while others accused it of teaching sex and violence. In the Xinwen Bao prior to the film's release, the critic Yan Duhe urged against exporting the film, writing that despite its potential commercial success "for the sake of appearance, it is not very decent to show such criminal incidents to outsiders." (Note: Original: ｢为观瞻计，拿这种犯罪事件表演给外人看，恐怕不见得很体面。｣.) Similarly, in the Chunsheng Daily the drama critic Guan Ji'an questioned the prudence of adapting the case to film, deeming it unsuited for the purpose of "promoting China's inherent civilization and washing away the shame of Europe and the United States". (Note: Original: ｢发扬中国固有之文明、一洗欧美中之耻辱。｣.)

In 1923, Yan Ruisheng was banned in Shanghai as part of an effort to crack down on films that challenged traditional morals. The Department of Mass Education at the Republic of China's Ministry of Education in Beijing similarly urged the banning of Yan Ruisheng and Zhang Shichuan's Zhang Xinsheng (1922) – another film based on a notorious murder case. The ministry later drafted a series of regulations seeking to censor films that "disturbed social order, damaged social mores and (in the case of foreign films particularly) were offensive to Chinese sensibility", publishing them in 1926. This was part of a broader discourse on the influence of cinema – particularly the crime genre – on Chinese society; critics claimed that films were incentivizing crimes and other immoral acts.

== Legacy ==
Yan Ruisheng was the first Chinese-made full-length feature film. Inspired by the film's commercial success, numerous companies began working on their own productions. Two more feature-length films, Dan Duyu's Sea Oath and Guan Haifeng's The Pink Skull, were released by the end of the year. (Note: The Pink Skull also used equipment loaned from the Commercial Press (Qian 2024, p. 52).) By the middle of the 1920s, some 146 film studios had been established in Shanghai alone; most never completed a film. Of the films that were completed, many focused on urban crime, which continued to draw commercial audiences – and criticism from journalists. Others, drawing on the popularity of courtesans, hired former prostitutes as actresses or wrote scripts centred around the practice. (Note: Zhang (1999, p. 166) mentions Zheng Zhengqiu, who recruited the courtesan Xuan Jinglin for his film The Last Trace of Conscience (1925) and later wrote the "hooker with a heart of gold" story A Woman in Shanghai (1925) for her.)

The CCSS disbanded after the film's release, though members such as Ren Pengnian and Xu Xinfu remained active in the industry. The story of Yan Ruisheng remained well known through the 1930s. In 1938, the case was again adapted to film, this time by Kwan Man-ching in Hong Kong. Starring Yip Fat-Yeuk as Yan Ruisheng and Fa Ying-Yung as Wang Lianying, this version was given the English title Woe to the Debauched! but was known in Chinese as Yan Ruisheng. The case also served as an inspiration for Jiang Wen's Gone with the Bullets (2014). The film, in which Jiang starred alongside Ge You and Shu Qi, followed a mafioso in 1920s China who arranged to launder money by staging a beauty pageant.

The film Yan Ruisheng is thought lost. (Note: The earliest Chinese film known to have survived in its entirety – the short Labourer's Love (1922) – was produced the following year (Rea 2021, p. 22).) The loss of early Chinese films has been attributed to various causes, including natural degradation, internal conflict, and warfare; for example, the Japanese bombing of Shanghai on 28 January 1932 resulted in the destruction of numerous works by Mingxing, the Commercial Press, and other studios. Several film stills from Yan Ruisheng are known to have survived.

== Sources ==
- Chen Jianhua (陈建华) (24 August 2021). 《阎瑞生》摄制与剧照之百年回观 [A Century-long Review of the Filming and Stills of "Yan Ruisheng"]. The Paper (in Chinese). Archived from the original on 19 January 2025.
- Cheng Hsiao-yuan (程筱媛) (2024). 被搬演的真實: 1920 年代上海時事戲《槍斃閻瑞生》 [Reality on Stage: Executing Yen Ruisheng, a 1920's Topical Drama in Shanghai]. Journal of Chinese Ritual, Theatre & Folklore (in Chinese): 49–89.
- "Director Pays Homage to Famous Films". Shanghai Daily. Shanghai. 26 December 2014. ProQuest 1640452864.
- "Gone With the Bullets". Shenzhen Daily. Shenzhen. 26 December 2014. ProQuest 1640426036.
- He, Qiliang (2018). Newspapers and the Journalistic Public in Republican China: 1917 as a Significant Year for Journalism. New York, London: Routledge. ISBN 978-0-429-79669-2.
- Hershatter, Gail (1999). Dangerous Pleasures: Prostitution and Modernity in Twentieth-Century Shanghai. Berkeley: University of California Press. ISBN 978-0-520-20439-3.
- Lee, Daw-Ming (2012). Historical Dictionary of Taiwan Cinema. Lanham, Maryland: Scarecrow Press. ISBN 978-0-8108-7922-5.
- Lee, Leo Ou-fan (1999). Shanghai Modern: The Flowering of a New Urban Culture in China, 1930–1945. Cambridge, Massachusetts: Harvard University Press. ISBN 978-0-674-80551-4.
- Li, Haihong (2023). "Periodicals and Rejected Silent Films in the Republic of China". The Journal of Modern Periodical Studies. 14 (2): 210–229. doi:10.5325/jmodeperistud.14.2.0210.
- Mulvey, Stephen (26 June 2010). "Why China's Currency has Two Names". BBC News. London. Archived from the original on 5 March 2014.
- Qian, Ying (2024). Revolutionary Becomings: Documentary Media in Twentieth-Century China. New York: Columbia University Press. ISBN 978-0-231-55555-5.
- Rea, Christopher (2021). Chinese Film Classics, 1922-1949. New York: Columbia University Press. ISBN 978-0-231-18813-5.
- 第三节 娼妓 [Section 3: Prostitution]. Shanghai Chronicles (in Chinese). Government of Shanghai. 4 July 2008. Archived from the original on 9 October 2024.
- Selbo, Jule (2015). "China and Hong Kong: Overview". In Nelmes, Jill; Selbo, Jule (eds.). Women Screenwriters: An International Guide. New York: Springer. p. 55. ISBN 978-1-137-31237-2.
- Sun Chengjian (孙承健) (20 January 2022). 徐欣夫 [Xu Xinfu]. Encyclopaedia of China (in Chinese) (3rd ed.).
- Sugawara, Yoshino (2018). "Toward the Opposite Side of 'Vulgarity'". Early Film Culture in Hong Kong, Taiwan, and Republican China. Ann Arbor: University of Michigan Press. pp. 179–201. doi:10.2307/j.ctt22727c7.11. ISBN 978-0-472-07372-6. JSTOR j.ctt22727c7.11.
- 香港影片大全: 卷. 1913-1941 [The Complete Collection of Hong Kong Films: Vol. 1913-1941] (in Chinese). Hong Kong: Hong Kong Film Archive. 1997. ISBN 978-962-8050-03-1.
- Troost, Kristof Van Den (2023). "Gangsters and Unofficial Justice Fighters: Realist Lunlipian versus Action-Adventure Films". In Kristof Van Den, Troost (ed.). Hong Kong Crime Films: Criminal Realism, Censorship and Society, 1947-1986. Edinburg: Edinburg University Press. pp. 27–54. doi:10.3366/edinburgh/9781399521765.003.0002. ISBN 978-1-3995-2176-5.
- Wei Shiyu (魏時煜) (2016). 東西方電影 (增訂版) [Movies of the East and West - Expanded Edition] (in Chinese). Hong Kong: City University of HK Press. ISBN 978-962-937-265-1.
- Xiao, Zhiwei (1998a). "Chinese Cinema". In Zhang, Yingjin; Xiao, Zhiwei (eds.). Encyclopedia of Chinese Film. New York, London: Routledge. pp. 3–30. ISBN 978-0-415-15168-9.
- Xiao, Zhiwei (1998b). "Zhang Shichuan". In Zhang, Yingjin; Xiao, Zhiwei (eds.). Encyclopedia of Chinese Film. New York, London: Routledge. p. 390. ISBN 978-0-415-15168-9.
- Xiao, Zhiwei (2013). "Policing Film in Early Twentieth-Century China". In Rojas, Carlos; Chow, Eileen (eds.). The Oxford Handbook of Chinese Cinemas. Oxford: Oxford University Press. pp. 452–471. doi:10.1093/oxfordhb/9780199765607.013.0025. ISBN 978-0-19-998331-5.
- Xiong, Yuezhi (2011). "From Racecourse to People's Park and People's Square: Historical Transformation and Symbolic Significance". Urban History. 38 (3): 475–490. doi:10.1017/S0963926811000538. JSTOR 44614610.
- Xu, Gary (2012). "Chinese Cinema and Technology". In Zhang, Yingjin (ed.). A Companion to Chinese Cinema. Hoboken, New Jersey: Wiley. pp. 449–465. doi:10.1002/9781444355994. ISBN 978-1-4443-5599-4.
- Xu, Xiaoqun (2000). Chinese Professionals and the Republican State: The Rise of Professional Associations in Shanghai, 1912–1937. Cambridge, United Kingdom: Cambridge University Press. ISBN 978-1-139-43184-2.
- Yeh, Emily Yueh-yu (2013). "A Small History of Wenyi". In Rojas, Carlos; Chow, Eileen (eds.). The Oxford Handbook of Chinese Cinemas. Oxford: Oxford University Press. pp. 225–249. doi:10.1093/oxfordhb/9780199765607.013.0013. ISBN 978-0-19-998331-5.
- Zhang, Yingjin (1998). "Censorship and Film". In Zhang, Yingjin; Xiao, Zhiwei (eds.). Encyclopedia of Chinese Film. New York, London: Routledge. pp. 109–110. ISBN 978-0-415-15168-9.
- Zhang, Yingjin (1998). "Yan Ruisheng". In Zhang, Yingjin; Xiao, Zhiwei (eds.). Encyclopedia of Chinese Film. New York, London: Routledge. p. 380. ISBN 978-0-415-15168-9.
- Zhang, Yingjin (1999). Cinema and Urban Culture in Shanghai, 1922-1943. Redwood City, California: Stanford University Press. ISBN 978-0-8047-3572-8.
- Zhang, Zhen (2005). "Yan Ruisheng". An Amorous History of the Silver Screen: Shanghai Cinema, 1896–1937. Chicago: University of Chicago Press. ISBN 978-0-226-98238-0.
- Zhong, Dafeng; Zhang, Zhen; Zhang, Yingjin (1997). "From Wenmingxi (Civilized Play) to Yingxi (Shadowplay): The Foundation of Shanghai Film Industry in the 1920s". Asian Cinema. 9 (1): 46–64. doi:10.1386/ac.9.1.46_1.
