= Dream of the Red Chamber (1944 film) =

1944 Chinese film by Bu Wancang

- DVD cover for Dream of the Red Chamber (1944)
- Traditional Chinese: 紅樓夢
- Simplified Chinese: 红楼梦
- Literal meaning: Dream of the Red Mansions
- Directed by: Bu Wancang
- Written by: Bu Wancang
- Based on: Dream of the Red Chamber by Cao Xueqin
- Produced by: Hu Xuguang
- Starring: Zhou Xuan; Bai Hong; Wang Danfeng; Yuan Meiyun
- Cinematography: Yu Xingshan
- Edited by: Wang Chao-Hsi
- Music by: Li Jinguang
- Production company: Chinese Movie Joint Company Ltd. (中華電影聯合股份有限公司)
- Release date: 1944 (China)
- Running time: 125 minutes
- Country: China
- Language: Mandarin

The full film

Dream of the Red Chamber (traditional Chinese: 紅樓夢; simplified Chinese: 红楼梦; pinyin: Hónglóu mèng) (also known as Dream of the Red Mansions and The Red Chamber Dream) is a 1944 Chinese film directed by Bu Wancang. It is an adaptation of the classic 18th century Qing-era novel by Cao Xueqin. The film follows Yue Opera tradition of casting a female actor in a male role.

It is the third known film adaptation of the novel. The earliest was a short film made in 1924 starring male Peking Opera singer Mei Lanfang as Lin Daiyu, and the second a silent film made in 1927, directed by Ren Pengnian and Yu Boyan.

== Cast ==
- Yuan Meiyun as Jia Baoyu (cross-gender acting)
- Zhou Xuan as Lin Daiyu
- Wang Danfeng as Xue Baochai
- Bai Hong as Wang Xifeng
- Ouyang Sha-fei as Hua Xiren

== Release ==
The film was released into the public domain 50 years after it was published, under copyright laws in the People's Republic of China.

It was distributed as a double feature with Empress Wu Zetian by Cinema Epoch in 2008, as part of their Chinese Film Classics Collection.
