= The Witty Sorcerer =

1931 Hong Kong film by Lai Pak-hoi

Chinese name
- Traditional Chinese: 左慈戲曹
- Simplified Chinese: 左慈戏曹
Transcriptions
Standard Mandarin
- Hanyu Pinyin: Zuǒ Cí xì Cáo
- Directed by: Lai Pak-hoi
- Written by: Luo Guanzhong
- Starring: Lai Pak-hoi; Xu Menghen
- Release date: 14 March 1931
- Country: Hong Kong
- Language: Silent

The Witty Sorcerer, also known as Zuo ci xi cao, is a 1931 Hong Kong historical comedy-drama film, directed by Lai Pak-hoi. It was released on 14 March 1931 after Lai's other film The Pain of Separation and starred Lai himself and Xu Menghen. It is based on a story in the 14th-century historical novel Romance of the Three Kingdoms about Zuo Ci playing tricks on Cao Cao (played by Lai Pak-hoi). It was one of the earliest locally filmed Hong Kong feature films to become successful on a grand scale.

== See also ==
- List of media adaptations of Romance of the Three Kingdoms
