= Lai Pak-hoi =

Chinese actor and producer

- 黎北海
- Born: 1889
- Died: 1950 (aged 60–61)
- Years active: 1909—1935

Lai Pak-hoi or Li Beihai (Chinese: 黎北海) (1889–1950) was a Chinese actor and producer based in Hong Kong, and an early pioneer of the Hong Kong film industry.

== Biography ==
Lai began his career as an actor, and was involved in one of the first films made in China, Stealing a Roast Duck, a silent short directed by Liang Shaobo in 1909. The film was financed by the Asia Film Company, owned by an American cinematographer and producer, Benjamin Brodsky. The film allegedly predated Zhuangzi Tests His Wife, although this has been disputed, since no records of the film remain. Lai was involved in the making of Zhuangzi Tests His Wife, the first confirmed Hong Kong-produced film, acting as owner of the company that financed the film, the China-America Company. The China-America Company, or Hua Mei, was founded by Lai with his former colleague Brodsky and Lai's brother, Lai Man-Wai.

Lai, along with his brothers Lai Man-wai and Lai Hoi-shan, founded the first Chinese-owned production company in China, the China Sun Motion Picture Company. The British colonial government rejected their plans to build the studio in Hong Kong, so they were forced to do so in neighboring Guangzhou in 1924.

In 1925, Lai directed Rouge, the region's first feature-length film. He also started the China Sound and Silent Movies Company, which released the first Cantonese talkie, Conscience, in Hong Kong in 1933. Conscience was only a partial sound film however, a full sound film, An Idiot Disturbs the House, was released the same year.

Lai left the Hong Kong film industry in 1935, and died later in 1950.

== Legacy ==
Lai is commemorated with a star at the Avenue of Stars in Hong Kong.
