= Ruisheng =

Ruisheng (Chinese: 瑞生) is a Chinese masculine given name. Notable people with this name include:

- Lín Ruìshēng (Chinese: 林瑞生), Singaporean politician
- Yan Ruisheng, the title character of Yan Ruisheng (Chinese: 閻瑞生), 1921 Chinese lost silent film
