= Shadow Magic =

2000 historical fiction film

- DVD cover
- Chinese: 西洋镜
- Directed by: Ann Hu
- Written by: Ann Hu; Chen Yixiong; Huang Dan; Liu Huaizhuo; Bob McAndrew; Kate Raisz; Tang Louyi; Zuo Shiqiang
- Produced by: Ann Hu; Han Sanping
- Starring: Xia Yu; Jared Harris; Xing Yufei; Liu Peiqi
- Cinematography: Nancy Schreiber; Wen Deguang
- Edited by: Keith Reamer; John Gilroy
- Music by: Zhang Lida
- Distributed by: Sony Pictures Classics
- Release date: September 2000
- Running time: 115 minutes
- Country: China
- Languages: Mandarin; English

Shadow Magic (simplified Chinese: 西洋镜; traditional Chinese: 西洋鏡; pinyin: Xīyángjìng) is a 2000 historical fiction film about the introduction of motion pictures to China during the early 20th century. The film was directed and co-written by Ann Hu. It was a US-China co-production starring Xia Yu, Jared Harris and Xing Yufei. The film was Ann Hu's directorial debut.

The film was shown at the 2000 Toronto International Film Festival.

== Plot ==
The film is set in Beijing, 1902, in the last years of the Qing Dynasty. A young portrait photographer, Liu Jinglun (Xia Yu), chances on a newly arrived Englishman, Raymond Wallace (Jared Harris) in the capital. Liu, a self-learner of rudimentary English, is keen on new technology and gadgets, while Raymond has brought along the latest motion picture camera and projector with some silent film shorts from the West. Liu is fascinated by the "shadow magic" and offers to help Raymond bring in audiences for his theatre. Hence Liu and Raymond become partners. However, while the innovation thrills many, the more conservative Chinese in the capital frown upon the creation as a Western "pollutant".

Liu falls in love with Ling (Xing Yufei), the daughter of a well-respected Beijing Opera star, Lord Tan (Li Yusheng). However, as he is poor and only an apprentice at the photography shop, Liu has no chance of marrying Ling. Instead, Liu's father and his boss at the Fengtai photography shop, Master Ren (Liu Peiqi), try to arrange a marriage for him with an older widow, Jiang (Fang Qingzhuo). When Master Ren finds out Liu has been working for a foreigner dabbling with "shadow magic", he becomes infuriated. Liu tries to reason with Master Ren, explaining to him that this "shadow magic" is an innovation in the world of photography, and once Liu learns more about it they should incorporate it into their own business. Master Ren is not swayed, however, and dismisses him. Because of this, Liu is also disowned by his father. Liu and Raymond's friendship becomes tested as he feels the strain of being branded a traitor in his own country.

Liu, Raymond, Master Ren and Lord Tan are all invited to the Forbidden City to entertain the Empress Dowager Cixi during her birthday celebrations. Master Ren and his apprentices take a photograph of the Empress Dowager, while Lord Tan performs his opera number. Liu and Raymond project some Western film shorts to the amusement of the Empress Dowager and her coterie. However, hand-cranking causes the projector to catch fire, the screening is ruined midway, and Liu is badly burnt. The Qing officials are incensed that Liu and Raymond nearly cause deaths during the birthday celebration of the esteemed Dowager, but the Dowager pardons Liu for his naivety. Raymond, however, is immediately banished from China.

Half a year passes, and Liu recovers from his burns. Raymond, fondly remembering their friendship and times in China, sends him the nitrate negatives of movies they shot together in Beijing, imploring that he should not let the work they started together die. Liu decides to try making a film projector himself and successfully screens these local movies to a group of Beijing natives. Liu's father decides to support him in this venture and Ling visits him on the sly at the projection room, where they kiss. The film ends with the Beijing natives gradually accepting the motion picture technology, once they see how beautifully it captures the majesty of the Chinese landscape.

At the film's end, captions reveal that Liu and Master Ren become the first Chinese to shoot a motion picture. The film, starring Lord Tan, is the now famous Dingjun Mountain.

== Cast ==
- Xia Yu as Liu Jinglun (based on Liu Zhonglun, the cinematographer of Dingjun Mountain)
- Jared Harris as Raymond Wallace
- Xing Yufei as Tan Xiaoling, Tan Linmei's daughter
- Liu Peiqi as Master Ren (based on Ren Jingfeng, the director of Dingjun Mountain)
- Li Yusheng as Tan Linmei (based on Tan Xinpei, the star of Dingjun Mountain)
- Lü Liping as Mr. Ren's wife
- Fang Qingzhuo as Widow Jiang
- Li Bin as Empress Dowager Cixi

== Reception ==
As of March 2024, 73% of the 51 reviews compiled by Rotten Tomatoes are positive, with an average rating of 6.2/10. The website's critics consensus reads: "Charmingly sweet, Shadow Magic captures the sense of wonder of audiences experiencing the world of motion pictures for the first time."
