= Stealing a Roast Duck =

1909 Hong Kong film by Liang Shaobo

- Directed by: Liang Shaobo
- Starring: Lai Pak-hoi; Liang Shao-Bo; Wong Chun-man
- Production company: Asia Film and Theater Company
- Release date: 1909
- Country: Hong Kong
- Language: No Spoken Language

Stealing a Roast Duck (Chinese: 偷燒鴨; pinyin: Tōu shāo yā; Jyutping: Tau1 siu1ap3) is a silent short directed by Liang Shao-Bo in 1909; it is considered the first film from Hong Kong. The film stars Lai Pak-hoi in a lead role, while Shao-Bo stars as the eponymous duck thief. Due to the Japanese destroying film to make bombs with nitrate, no copy of the film is extant; there has been doubt whether the film even actually existed. There are also signs that the film was shown in 1917 in Los Angeles, which would make it the earliest Chinese film with a foreign release.

== Cast ==
- Lai Pak-hoi
- Liang Shao-Bo - duck thief
- Wong Chun-man
