= Wang Danfeng =

Chinese actress (1924–2018)

- 王丹凤
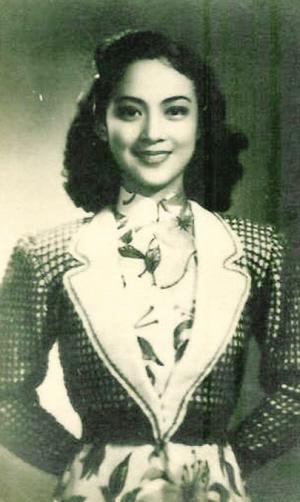
- Born: Wang Yufeng; 23 August 1924; Shanghai, Republic of China
- Died: 2 May 2018 (aged 93); Shanghai, People's Republic of China
- Occupation: Film actress
- Notable work: New Fisherman's Song; Dream of the Red Chamber; A Nurse's Diary
- Spouses: Liu Heqing (m. 1951; died 2016)
- Children: 4 daughters

Chinese name
- Traditional Chinese: 王丹鳳
- Simplified Chinese: 王丹凤
Transcriptions
Standard Mandarin
- Hanyu Pinyin: Wáng Dānfèng
- Wade–Giles: Wang Tan-feng
- IPA: [wǎŋ tánfə̂ŋ]
Wu
- Romanization: Hhuaan^{3} Te^{1} Von^{3}

Wang Danfeng (Chinese: 王丹凤; 23 August 1924 – 2 May 2018) was a Chinese actress who was active mainly between the 1940s and the 1960s. She was one of the most influential actresses in Chinese cinema, and was named as one of the four great actresses in Hong Kong in 1949. She received the official recognition as a "movie star of New China" in 1962 and two Lifetime Achievement Awards in 2013 and 2017. Over a career spanning more than four decades, she starred in more than 60 films.

== Career ==
=== Republican era ===
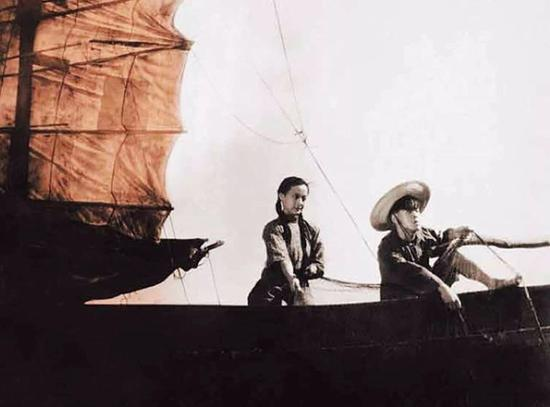
Wang in the film New Fisherman's Song (1942)

Wang was born on 23 August 1924 in Shanghai. Her birth name was Wang Yufeng (王玉凤; 王玉鳳). When she was a 16-year-old middle school student, she was discovered by the director, Zhu Shilin, and debuted in a supporting role in the 1941 film The Dragon Dungeon and Tiger's Den. Zhu then cast her as the leading actress in his 1942 film New Fisherman's Song, a remake of the silent classic, Song of the Fishermen, starring Wang Renmei. It was a great box-office success and launched Wang Danfeng to stardom.

She appeared in two dozen films in the 1940s, and her typical roles were abused or persecuted women. One of her favourite roles was Xue Baochai in the 1944 film Dream of the Red Chamber, in which she co-starred with her idol, Zhou Xuan, and worked under the famous director Bu Wancang. The film greatly enhanced her self-esteem.

In 1948, during the Chinese Civil War, Wang moved to British Hong Kong at the invitation of the Great Wall Movie Enterprises and starred in six films with the studio. In July 1949, she was named by Hong Kong media as one of the four great actresses, together with Li Li-hua, Zhou Xuan, and Bai Guang.

=== People's Republic of China ===
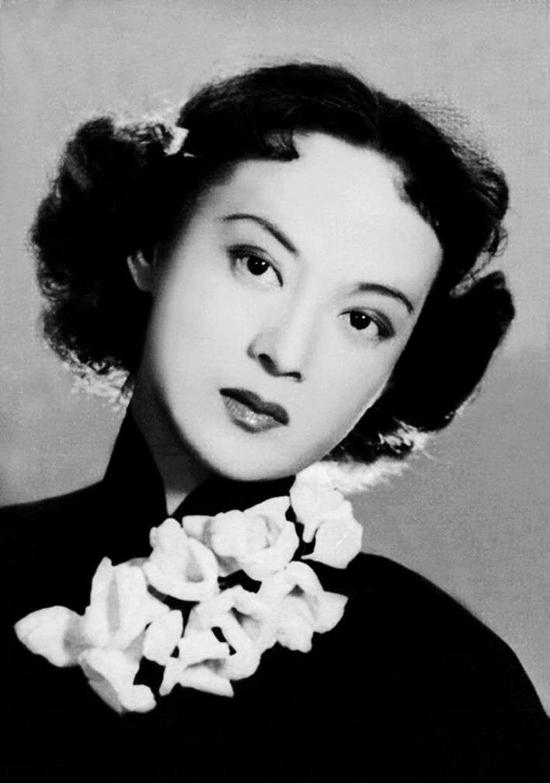
Wang Danfeng

After the establishment of the People's Republic of China in 1949, she returned to Shanghai in 1951 to marry her long-time fiancé, Liu Heqing (柳和清). Their wedding was a media sensation in Shanghai and Hong Kong. In 1952, the Communist government reorganized film companies in Shanghai into the state-owned Shanghai Film Studio, and Wang acted in ten films for the studio before the Cultural Revolution. One of her most celebrated roles was the young nurse in A Nurse's Diary. The scene of her humming the song, "The Little Swallow", to put a baby to sleep is widely remembered decades later. Roman Tam, the iconic Cantopop singer who called Wang his idol, said he watched the film three times and memorized the song.

In 1963, she portrayed the patriotic courtesan Li Xiangjun in the film, The Peach Blossom Fan, which was directed by Sun Jing. It was soon denounced as a tribute to the "feudal" scholar and beauty genre, and Wang, Sun, and the lead actor Feng Zhe were all persecuted during the Cultural Revolution. She was sent to perform hard labour in the countryside, and was prevented from acting for 15 years. She survived the tumultuous period largely unscathed, however, partly because the film was not labelled a "giant poisonous weed".

After the end of the Cultural Revolution, she made a comeback attempt and appeared in several films from 1978 to 1980, but they were mostly unsuccessful. She retired in 1980, after portraying a Japanese scientist in her last film, The Jade-Colored Butterfly. She was invited to, and attended, the second inauguration of U.S. President Ronald Reagan in 1985.

In 2013, the China Film Performance Art Academy awarded Wang the Golden Phoenix Lifetime Achievement Award. In June 2017, she received the Lifetime Achievement Award at the 20th Shanghai International Film Festival. She was described as a "legendary" actress and "film icon" in official Chinese media.

== Personal life ==
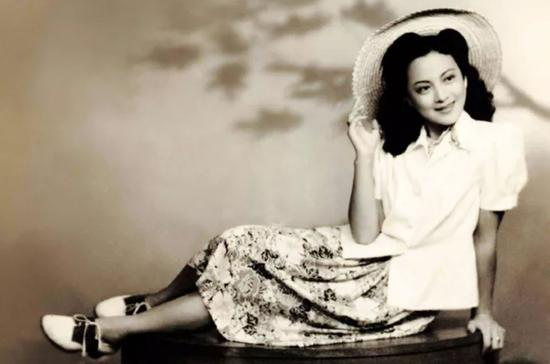
Wang in the 1940s

Wang had a lifelong marriage with Liu Heqing, who was the son of Liu Zhongliang (柳中亮), a co-founder of Shanghai's Cathay Film Company. They wedded on New Year's Day of 1951 and the marriage lasted for more than 65 years, until Liu's death on 4 February 2016 at age 90. They had four daughters.

Wang and her husband moved to Hong Kong in the late 1980s and opened the vegetarian restaurant, Gong De Lin (also known as Godly). After they turned 80, they sold the successful business and returned to Shanghai.

== Death ==
On the morning of 2 May 2018, Wang died at Huadong Hospital in Shanghai, aged 93 (94 by East Asian age reckoning).
