= Cinema of Hong Kong =

Cinema originating from the city of Hong Kong

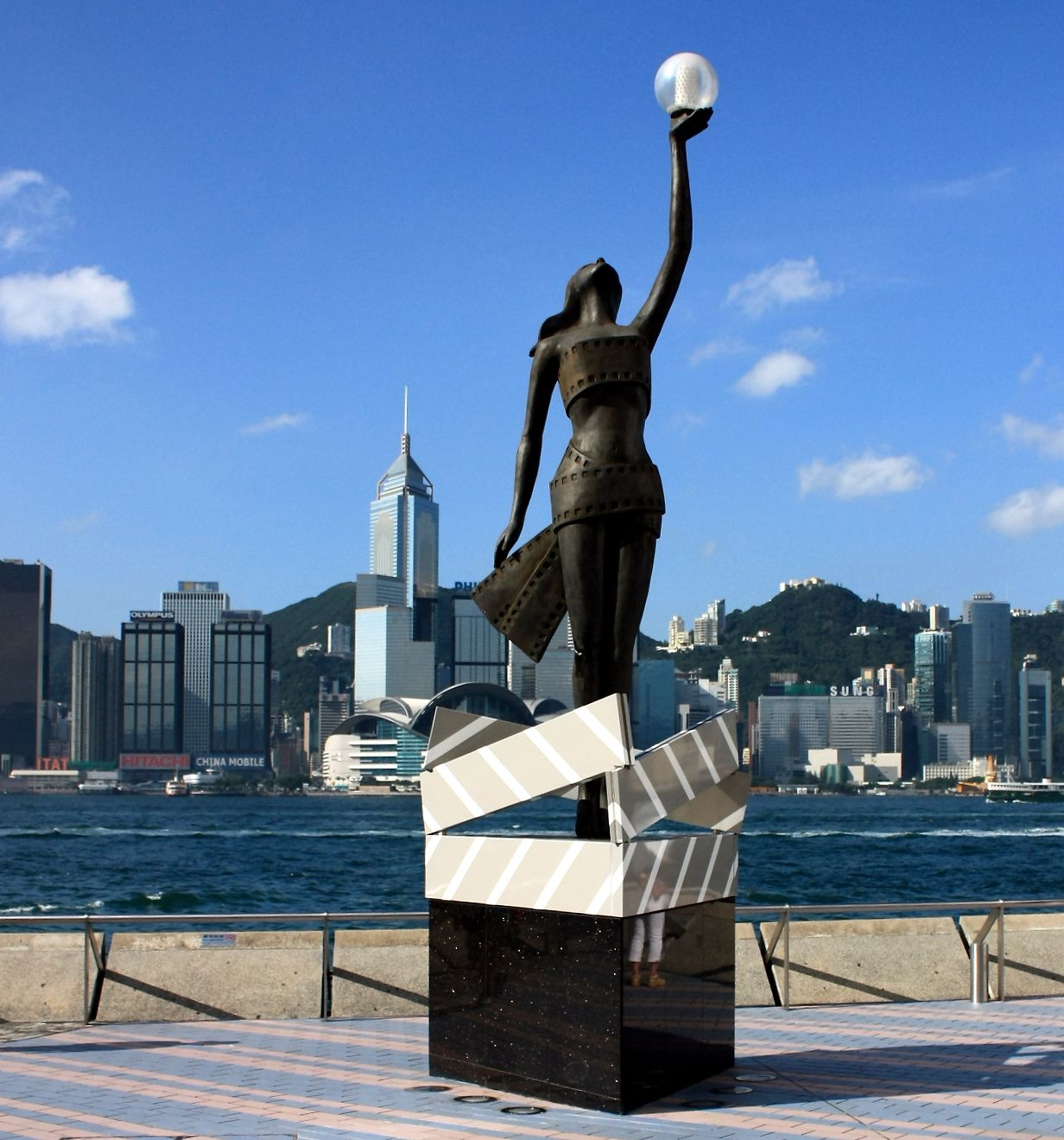
- Replica of the Hong Kong Film Awards statuette on the Avenue of Stars in Tsim Sha Tsui, Hong Kong
- No. of screens: 282 (2024)
  - Per capita: 3.1 per 100,000 (2011)

Produced feature films (2005–2009)
- Total: 56 (average)

Number of admissions (2010)
- Total: 22,500,000
  - Per capita: 3.2 (2010)

Gross box office (2021)
- Total: HK$1.2 billion

The cinema of Hong Kong is one of the three major threads in the history of Chinese-language cinema, alongside the cinema of China and the cinema of Taiwan. As a former Crown colony, Hong Kong had a greater degree of artistic freedom than mainland China and Taiwan, and developed into a filmmaking hub for the Chinese-speaking world (including its worldwide diaspora).

Hong Kong became the leading film exporter in East Asia in the 1960s, with its film output surpassing Hollywood, and remained the second-largest exporter (after Hollywood) from the 1970s through the 1990s. It also had the third-largest film industry in the world during the 1980s and 1990s, behind Hollywood and Bollywood. Despite an industry crisis starting in the mid-1990s and Hong Kong's transfer to Chinese sovereignty in July 1997, Hong Kong film has retained much of its distinctive identity and continues to play a prominent part on the world cinema stage. In the West, Hong Kong's vigorous pop cinema (especially Hong Kong action cinema) has long had a strong cult following, which is now a part of the cultural mainstream, widely available and imitated.

Economically, the film industry together with the value added of cultural and creative industries represents 5 per cent of Hong Kong's economy.

== The Hong Kong industry ==
Unlike many film industries, Hong Kong has enjoyed little or no direct government support, through either subsidies or import quotas. It is a commercial cinema: highly corporate, concentrating on crowd-pleasing genres like comedy and action, and relying on formulas, sequels and remakes.

Hong Kong film derives a number of elements from Hollywood, such as certain genre parameters, a "thrill-a-minute" philosophy and fast pacing and film editing. But the borrowings are filtered through elements from traditional Chinese drama and art, particularly a penchant for stylisation and a disregard for Western standards of realism. This, combined with a fast and loose approach to the filmmaking process, contributes to the energy and surreal imagination that foreign audiences note in Hong Kong cinema.

In 2010, the box office gross in Hong Kong was HK$1.339 billion and in 2011 it was HK$1.379 billion. There were 56 Hong Kong films and 220 foreign films released in 2011.

In 2017, the box office gross was HK$1.85 billion compared with HK$1.95 billion in 2016. 331 films were released in 2017, dropped from 348 the year before.

=== The star system ===
According to Paul McDonald, a star system emerged in Hollywood as talent scouts, coaches, and publicists were involved with finding performers and making them into stars. In the vertically integrated Hollywood film industry of the 1920s, 1930s, and 1940s, these responsibilities were all undertaken by the studios themselves. The studios made the stars and, due to notoriously restrictive terms imposed by exclusive services contracts, the studios also owned the stars. As is common in commercial cinema, the industry's heart is a highly developed star system. In earlier days, beloved performers from the Chinese opera stage often brought their audiences with them to the screen. For the past three or four decades, television has been a major launching pad for movie stardom, through acting courses and widely watched drama, comedy and variety series offered by the two major stations. Possibly even more important is the overlap with the Cantonese pop music industry. Many, if not most, movie stars have recording sidelines, and vice versa; this has been a key marketing strategy in an entertainment industry where American-style, multimedia advertising campaigns have until recently been little used. In the current commercially troubled climate, the casting of young Cantopop idols (such as Ekin Cheng and the Twins) to attract the all-important youth audience is endemic.

In the small and tightly knit industry, actors (as well as other personnel, such as directors) are kept very busy. During previous boom periods, the number of movies made by a successful figure in a single year could routinely reach double digits.

=== Budgets ===
Films are typically low-budget when compared with American films. A major release with a big star, aimed at "hit" status, will typically cost around US$5 million. A low-budget feature can go well below US$1 million. Occasional blockbuster projects by the very biggest stars (Jackie Chan or Stephen Chow, for example) or international co-productions ("crossovers") aimed at the global market, can go as high as US$20 million or more, but these are rare exceptions. Hong Kong productions can nevertheless achieve a level of gloss and lavishness greater than these numbers might suggest, given factors such as lower wages and value of the Hong Kong dollar.

=== Language and sound ===
Films in the Cantonese language have been made in Hong Kong since the beginning. In the 1950s, it also became a center of Mandarin-language filmmaking after the Communist takeover in mainland China and the entertainment industry shifted from Shanghai to Hong Kong. From the 1960s to mid-1970s, Mandarin film productions became dominant, especially those made by the Shaw Brothers studio in Hong Kong. There was also a short-lived period whereby Hokkien films were produced in Hong Kong, and there were also films made in the Teochew dialect. Cantonese films made a comeback in the 1970s, and since the 1980s, films have been made mostly in Cantonese.

For decades, films were typically shot silent, with dialogue and all other sound dubbed afterwards. In the hectic and low-budget industry, this method was faster and more cost-efficient than recording live sound, particularly when using performers from different dialect regions; it also helped facilitate dubbing into other languages for the vital export market (for example, Standard Mandarin for mainland China and Taiwan). Many busy stars would not even record their own dialogue, but would be dubbed by a lesser-known performer. Shooting without sound also contributed to an improvisatory filmmaking approach. Movies often went into production without finished scripts, with scenes and dialogue concocted on the set; especially low-budget productions on tight schedules might even have actors mouth silently or simply count numbers, with actual dialogue created only in the editing process.

A trend towards sync sound filming grew in the late 1990s and this method is now the norm, partly because of a widespread public association with higher quality cinema.

== History ==
=== 1909 to World War II ===
During its early history, Hong Kong's cinema played second fiddle to that of the mainland, particularly the city of Shanghai, which was then the movie capital of the Chinese-speaking world. Very little of this work is extant: one count finds only four films remaining out of over 500 produced in Hong Kong before World War II. Detailed accounts of this period therefore have inherent limitations and uncertainties.

==== Pioneers from the stage ====
As in most of China, the development of early films was tightly bound to Chinese opera, for centuries the dominant form of dramatic entertainment. Opera scenes were the source for what are generally credited as the first movies made in Hong Kong, two 1909 short comedies entitled Stealing a Roasted Duck and Right a Wrong with Earthenware Dish. The director was stage actor and director Liang Shaobo. The producer was an American, Benjamin Brodsky (sometimes transliterated 'Polaski'), one of a number of Westerners who helped jumpstart Chinese film through their efforts to crack China's vast potential market.

Credit for the first Hong Kong feature film is usually given to Zhuangzi Tests His Wife (1913), which also took its story from the opera stage, was helmed by a stage director and featured Brodsky's involvement. Director Lai Man-Wai (Li Ming Wei or Li Minwei in Mandarin) was a theatrical colleague of Liang Shaobo's who would become known as the "Father of Hong Kong Cinema". In another borrowing from opera, Lai played the role of wife himself. His brother played the role of husband, and his wife a supporting role as a maid, making her the first Chinese woman to act in a Chinese film, a milestone delayed by longstanding taboos regarding female performers. Zhuangzhi was the only film made by Chinese American Film, founded by Lai and Brodsky as the first movie studio in Hong Kong, and was never actually shown in the territory.

The following year, the outbreak of World War I put a large crimp in the development of cinema in Hong Kong, as Germany was the source of the colony's film stock. It was not until 1923 that Lai, his brother and their cousin joined with Liang Shaobo to form Hong Kong's first entirely Chinese-owned-and-operated production company, the China Sun Motion Picture Company. In 1924, they moved their operation to the Mainland after government red tape blocked their plans to build a studio.

==== The advent of sound ====
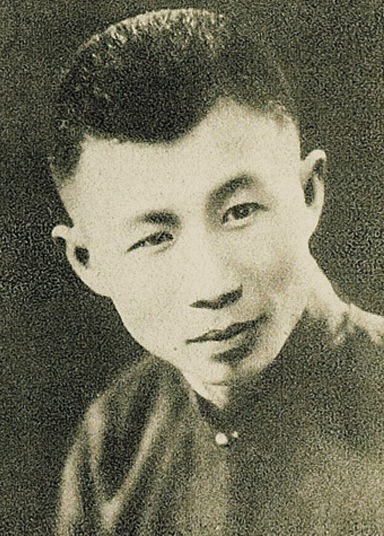
Runje Shaw, the eldest Shaw brother who started Shaw Brothers Studio, the largest Hong Kong film production company of that era.

With the popularity of talkies in the early 1930s, the problem of China's various spoken dialects had to be grappled with. Hong Kong was a major center for Cantonese, one of the most widely spoken, and political factors on the Mainland provided other opportunities. In 1932, the Shaw brothers, who formed the Tianyi Film Company, teamed up with Cantonese opera singer Sit Gok-Sin to make the first Cantonese talkie, White Gold Dragon, in Shanghai. This film proved to be very successful, and in 1934, they established a branch of the Tianyi Studio in Kowloon to make Cantonese films. The government of the Kuomintang or Nationalist Party wanted to enforce a "Mandarin-only" policy and was hostile to Cantonese filmmaking in China. It also banned the wildly popular wuxia genre of martial arts swordplay and fantasy, accusing it of promoting superstition and violent anarchy. Cantonese film and wuxia film remained popular despite government hostility, and the British colony of Hong Kong became a place where both of these trends could be freely served. Tianyi soon moved the entire film production operation from Shanghai to Hong Kong and reorganised Tianyi into Nanyang (南洋) Productions. The name 粵語長片 (pinyin: Yuèyǔ cháng piàn; Jyutping: jyut6 jyu5 coeng4 pin3*2) soon became the standard name for black and white Cantonese movies.

Filmed Cantonese operas proved even more successful than wuxia and constituted the leading genre of the 1930s. Major studios that thrived in this period were Grandview, Universal, and Nanyang (which later became the Shaw Brothers Studio that would have an enduring influence on Chinese film).

==== The war era ====
Another important factor in the 1930s was the second Sino-Japanese War. "National defense" films—patriotic war stories about Chinese resisting the Japanese invasion—became one of Hong Kong's major genres; notable titles included Kwan Man Ching's Lifeline (1935), Chiu Shu Sun's Hand to Hand Combat (1937) and Situ Huimin's March of the Partisans (1938). The genre and the film industry were further boosted by emigre film artists and companies when Shanghai was taken by the Japanese in 1937.

This of course came to an end when Hong Kong itself fell to the Japanese in December 1941. But unlike on the Mainland, the occupiers were not able to put together a collaborationist film industry. They managed to complete just one propaganda movie, The Attack on Hong Kong (1942; a.k.a. The Day of England's Collapse) before the British returned in 1945. A more important move by the Japanese may have been to melt down many of Hong Kong's pre-war films to extract their silver nitrate for military use.

=== The 1940s–1960s ===
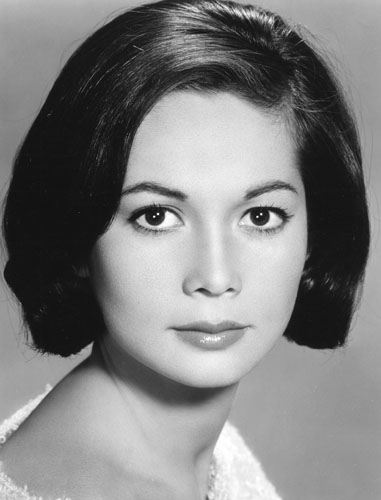
Nancy Kwan, a Hong Kong-born American actress.

Postwar Hong Kong cinema, like postwar Hong Kong industries in general, was catalysed by the continuing influx of capital and talents from mainland China. The Hong Kong population in 1940 was around 1 million and rose to around 3.9 million in 1967; the population increased around 2.9 million during this period. This became a flood with the 1946 resumption of the Chinese Civil War (which had been on hold during the fight against Japan) and then the 1949 Communist victory. These events definitively shifted the center of Chinese-language cinema to Hong Kong. The colony also did big business exporting films to Southeast Asian countries (especially but not exclusively due to their large Chinese expatriate communities) and to Chinatowns in Western countries.

==== Competing languages ====
The postwar era also cemented the bifurcation of the industry into two parallel cinemas, one in Mandarin, the dominant dialect of the Mainland emigres, and one in Cantonese, the dialect of most Hong Kong natives. The distinction between the two languages is in sound. During the silent film age the written language was Chinese and was known to all, no matter the language spoken. Subtitles allow both markets access to films. Mandarin movies sometimes had much higher budgets and more lavish production. Reasons included their enormous export market and the expertise and capital of the Shanghai filmmakers. For decades to come, Cantonese films, though sometimes more numerous, were relegated to second-tier status.

Most of the films reviewed by the Office for Film, Newspaper and Article Administration come with subtitles, although there is no law requiring them. According to Shu Kei (also known as Kenneth Ip), the reason for the inclusion of English subtitles must have been to target overseas audiences, while Chinese subtitles were added to reach those who could read Chinese, but could not understand Cantonese.

The books City on Fire: Hong Kong Cinema (1999) and Once Upon a Time in China (2003) claim that the British authorities passed a law in 1963 requiring the subtitling of all films in English, supposedly to enable a watch on political content. And that making a virtue of necessity, studios included Chinese subtitles as well, enabling easier access to their movies for speakers of other dialects.

Subtitling facilitated the movies' popularity in the West.

==== Cantonese movies ====
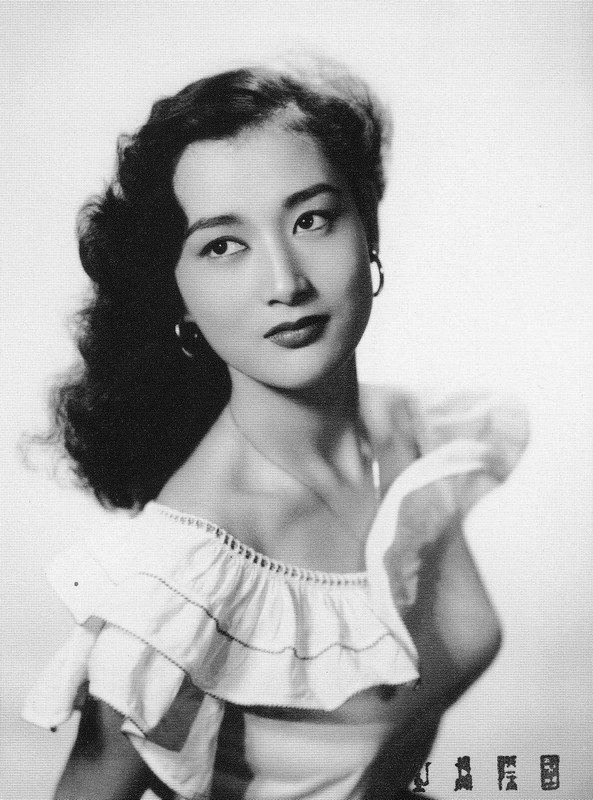
Julie Yeh Feng, an actress, singer and businesswoman. She starred in various films in throughout the 1950s and 1960s, and is considered to have been one of Hong Kong's biggest stars of the period.

During this period, Cantonese opera on film dominated. The top stars were the female duo of Yam Kim Fai and Pak Suet Sin (Yam–Pak for short). Yam specialised in male scholar roles to Pak's female leads. They made over fifty films together, The Purple Hairpin (1959) being one of the most enduringly popular (Teo, 1997).

Low-budget martial arts films were also popular. A series of roughly 100 kung fu movies starring Kwan Tak Hing as historical folk hero Wong Fei Hung were made, starting with The True Story of Wong Fei Hung (1949) and ending with Wong Fei Hung Bravely Crushing the Fire Formation (1970) (Logan, 1995). Fantasy wuxia (swordplay) serials with special effects drawn on the film by hand, such as The Six-Fingered Lord of the Lute (1965) starring teen idol Connie Chan Po-chu in the lead male role, were also popular, as were contemporary melodramas of home and family life, including the dramatisation of sibling rivalries in Our Sister Hedy (1957) starring Julie Yeh Feng.

==== Mandarin movies and the Shaws/Cathay rivalry ====
In Mandarin production, Shaw Brothers and Motion Picture and General Investments Limited (MP&GI, later renamed Cathay) were the top studios by the 1960s, and bitter rivals. The Shaws gained the upper hand in 1964 after the death in a plane crash of MP&GI founder and head Loke Wan Tho. The renamed Cathay faltered, ceasing film production in 1970 (Yang, 2003).

A musical genre called Huángméidiào (黃梅調) was derived from Chinese opera; the Shaws' record-breaking hit The Love Eterne (1963) remains the classic of the genre. Historical costume epics often overlapped with the Huángméidiào, such as in The Kingdom and the Beauty (1959). (Both of the above examples were directed by Shaw's star director, Li Han Hsiang). Romantic melodramas such as Red Bloom in the Snow (1956), Love Without End (1961), The Blue and the Black (1964) and adaptations of novels by Chiung Yao were popular. So were Hollywood-style musicals, which were a particular speciality of MP&GI/Cathay in entries such as Mambo Girl (1957) and The Wild, Wild Rose (1960).

In 1960s, the Motion Picture and General Investments Limited produced a special set of romantic movies which was called Southern and Northern. The first one is The Greatest Civil Wall on Earth (1961), the second one is The Greatest Wedding on Earth (1962) and the third one is The Greatest Love Affair on Earth (1964). This set of movies was partly spoken in Cantonese and partly spoken in Mandarin. The set of movies portrayed differences between Northern and Southern China; in addition to the language differences, the movies also depicted cultural aspects such as weddings and food. The movies' main theme was a kind of cultural integration between North and South.

In the second half of the 1960s, the Shaws inaugurated a new generation of more intense, less fantastical wuxia films with glossier production values, acrobatic moves and stronger violence. The trend was inspired by the popularity of imported samurai movies from Japan, as well as by the loss of movie audiences to television. This marked the crucial turn of the industry from a female-centric genre system to an action movie orientation. Key trendsetters included Xu Zenghong's Temple of the Red Lotus (1965), King Hu's Come Drink with Me (1966) and Dragon Inn (1967, made in Taiwan; a.k.a. Dragon Gate Inn), and Chang Cheh's Tiger Boy (1966), The One-Armed Swordsman (1967) and Golden Swallow (1968).

=== Years of transformation (1970s) ===
Mandarin-dialect film in general and the Shaw Brothers studio in particular began the 1970s in apparent positions of unassailable strength. Cantonese cinema virtually vanished in the face of Mandarin studios and Cantonese television, which became available to the general population in 1967; in 1972 no films in the local dialect were made. The Shaws saw their longtime rival Cathay ceasing film production, leaving themselves the only megastudio. The martial arts subgenre of the kung fu movie exploded into popularity internationally, with the Shaws driving and dominating the wave. But changes were beginning that would greatly alter the industry by the end of the decade.

==== The Cantonese comeback ====
Paradoxically, television would soon contribute to the revival of Cantonese in a movement towards more down-to-earth movies about modern Hong Kong life and average people.

The first spark was the ensemble comedy The House of 72 Tenants, the only Cantonese film made in 1973, a resounding hit. It was based on a well-known play and produced by the Shaws as a showcase for performers from their pioneering television station TVB.

The return of Cantonese really took off with the comedies of former TVB stars the Hui Brothers (actor-director-screenwriter Michael Hui, actor-singer Sam Hui and actor Ricky Hui). The rationale behind the move to Cantonese was clear in the trailer for the brothers' Games Gamblers Play (1974): "Films by devoted young people with you in mind." This move back to the local audience for Hong Kong cinema paid off immediately. Games Gamblers Play initially made US$1.4 million at the Hong Kong box office, becoming the highest-grossing film up to that point. The Hui movies also broke ground by satirising the modern reality of an ascendant middle class, whose long work hours and dreams of material success were transforming the colony into a modern industrial and corporate giant. Cantonese comedy thrived and Cantonese production skyrocketed; Mandarin hung on into the early 1980s, but has been relatively rare onscreen since.

==== Golden Harvest and the rise of the independents ====
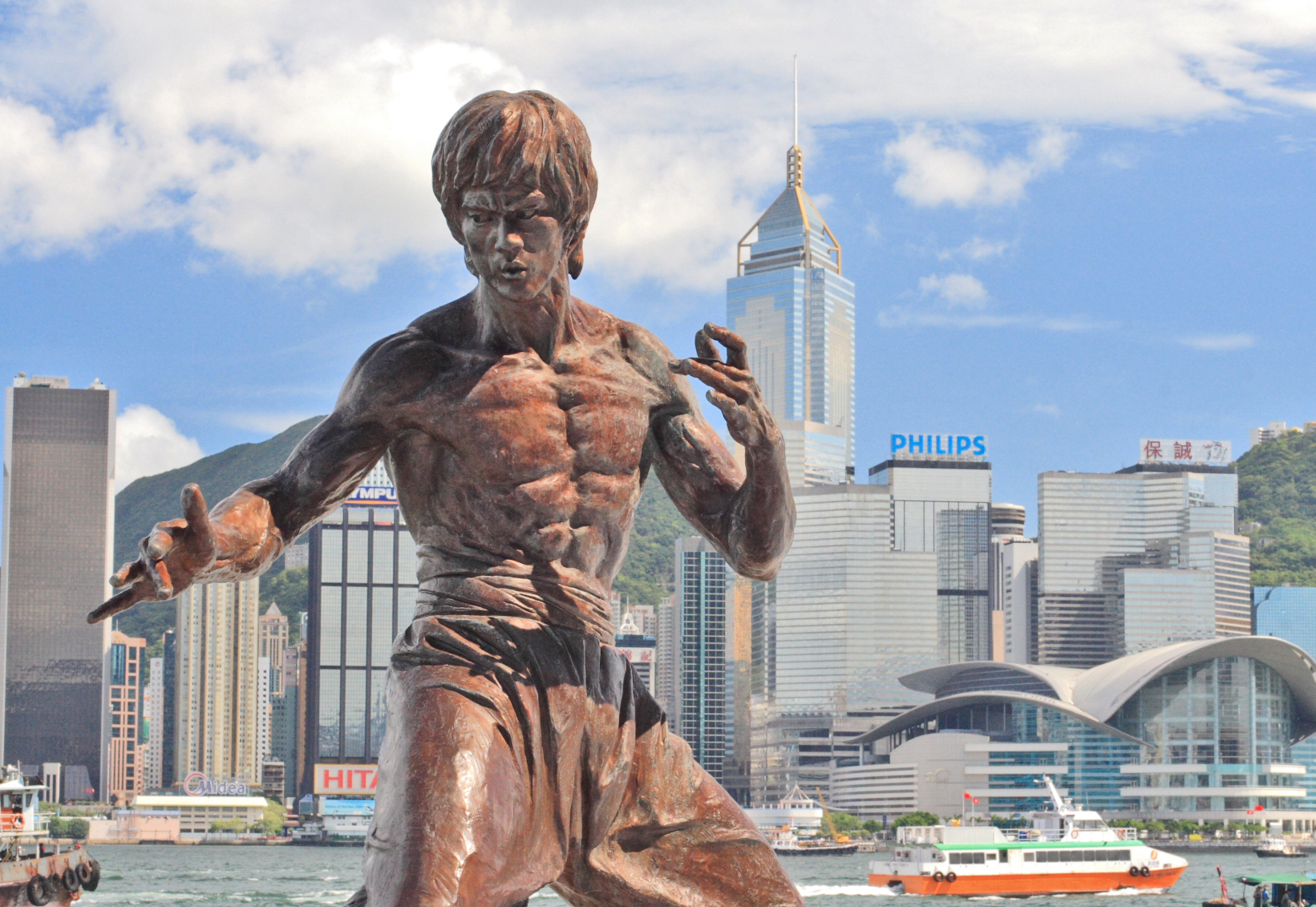
Statue of the movie star Bruce Lee on the Avenue of Stars of Hong Kong

In 1970, former Shaw Brothers executives Raymond Chow and Leonard Ho left to form their own studio, Golden Harvest. The upstart's more flexible and less tightfisted approach to the business outmaneuvered the Shaws' old-style studio. Chow and Ho landed contracts with rising young performers who had fresh ideas for the industry, like Bruce Lee and the Hui Brothers, and allowed them greater creative latitude than was traditional. California-born, Bruce Lee only found minor roles in U.S. films and television at first, as foreign actors were often criticized and not widely accepted by the audience during the 1970s in North America. Bruce expressed that the true orientals were not shown, especially in Hollywood, and most audiences still viewed Asian people as stereotypes (e.g. with flat eyes and pigtails). Moreover, the directors usually got him to do something just to be exotic. When Golden Harvest's The Big Boss (a.k.a. The Fists of Fury, 1971) came into theatres, it jump-started Lee's career into stardom and made martial arts and kung fu a global trend.

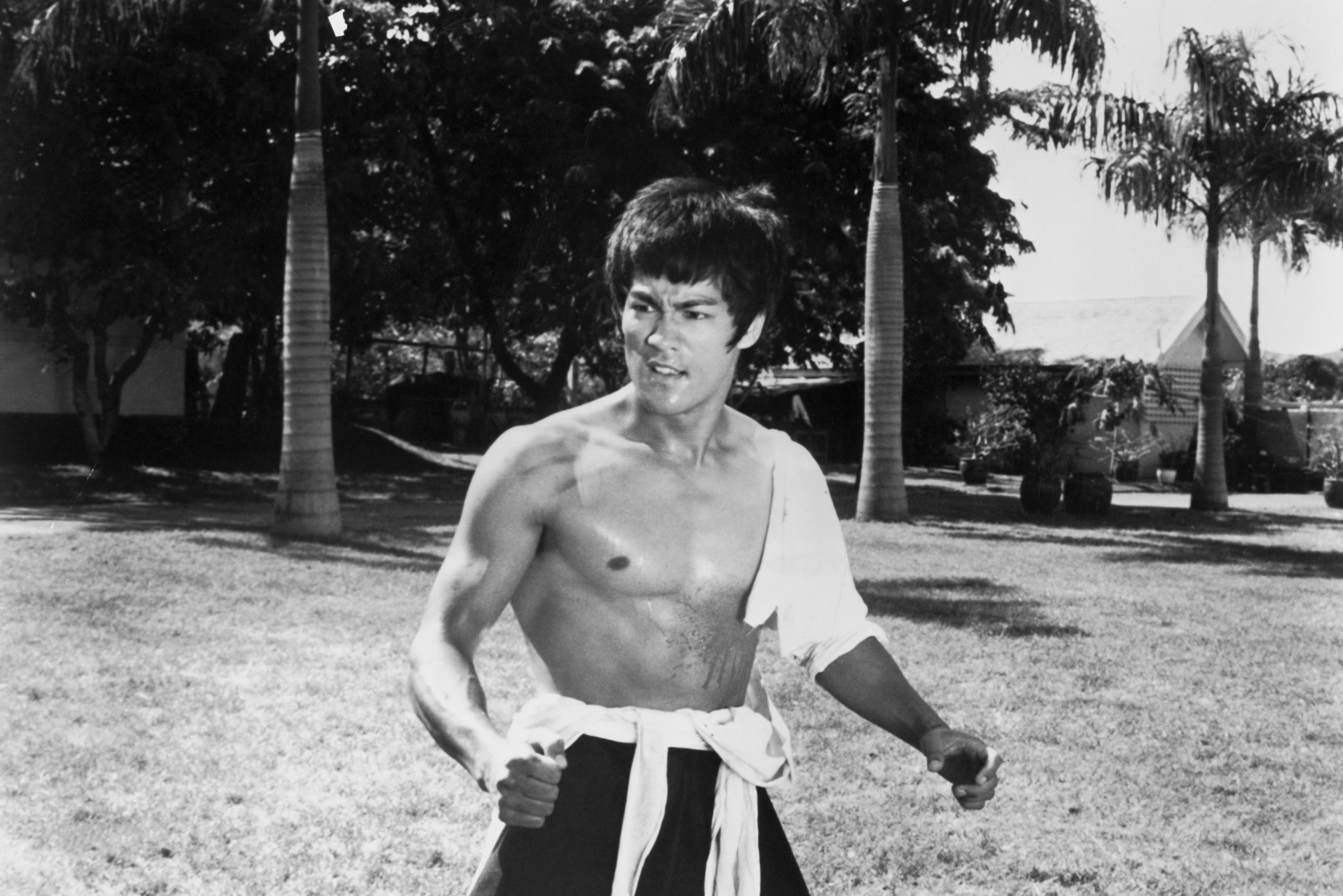
Bruce Lee

In 1976, Shaw Brothers made a series of true crime films. The first, The Criminals, took in HK$838,067, ranking at #33 in the Hong Kong box office for that year. Following its success, Shaw Brothers made The Criminals 2 – Homicides that same year, followed by three more films (The Criminals 3 – Arson, The Criminals 4 – Assault and The Criminals 5 – The Teenager's Nightmare) the following year. The first movie in The Criminals series included three true stories: The Human Torsos, The Stuntmen, and Valley of the Hanged; each story was filmed by a different director. Valley of the Hanged told the story of a triple murder in Hong Kong, as well as a story about an unfaithful wife humiliating her husband. The Shaw Brothers' films attracted audiences with bizarre true stories featuring erotic and violent scenes. Their films also portrayed the ordinary aspects of Hong Kongers' lives, such as playing mahjong, a popular form of gambling.

By the end of the 1970s, Golden Harvest was the top studio, signing with Jackie Chan, the kung fu comedy actor-filmmaker who would spend the next 20 years as Asia's biggest box office draw. Raymond Chow built upon Lee's success with The Big Boss (a.k.a. Fists of Fury, 1971), Fist of Fury (a.k.a. The Chinese Connection, 1972) and The Way of the Dragon (a.k.a. The Return of the Dragon, 1972), each of which broke Hong Kong box office records. Bruce Lee appeared with minor Hollywood actors in the larger budget Enter the Dragon (1973), a co-production with Warner Bros. Lee's death under mysterious circumstances made him a cult hero. Lee played a key role in opening foreign markets to Hong Kong films. Lee's films, enjoyed throughout the Third World, were often taken as symbolising the rebellious pride of insurgent Asia.

Meanwhile, the explosions of Cantonese and kung fu and the success of Golden Harvest created more space for independent producers and production companies. The era of the studio juggernauts was past. The Shaws nevertheless continued film production until 1985 before turning entirely to television.

==== Other transformative trends ====
The rapidly growing permissiveness in film content that was general in much of the world affected Hong Kong film as well. A genre of softcore erotica known as fengyue became a local staple (the name is a contraction of a Chinese phrase implying seductive decadence). Such material did not suffer as much of a stigma in Hong Kong as in most Western countries; it was more or less part of the mainstream, sometimes featuring contributions from major directors such as Chor Yuen and Li Han Hsiang and often crossbreeding with other popular genres like martial arts, the costume film and especially comedy. Violence also grew more intense and graphic, particularly at the instigation of martial arts filmmakers.

Director Lung Kong blended these trends into the social-issue dramas which he had already made his speciality with late 1960s Cantonese classics like The Story of a Discharged Prisoner (1967) and Teddy Girls (1969). In the 1970s, he began directing in Mandarin and brought exploitation elements to serious films about subjects like prostitution (The Call Girls and Lina), the atomic bomb (Hiroshima 28) and the fragility of civilised society (Yesterday, Today and Tomorrow (1970), which portrayed a plague-decimated, near-future Hong Kong).

The brief career of Tang Shu Shuen, the territory's first noted woman director, produced two films, The Arch (1968) and China Behind (1974), that were trailblazers for a local, socially critical art cinema. They are also widely considered forerunners of the last major milestone of the decade, the so-called Hong Kong New Wave that would come from outside the traditional studio hierarchy and point to new possibilities for the industry.

=== 1980s – early 1990s: the boom years ===
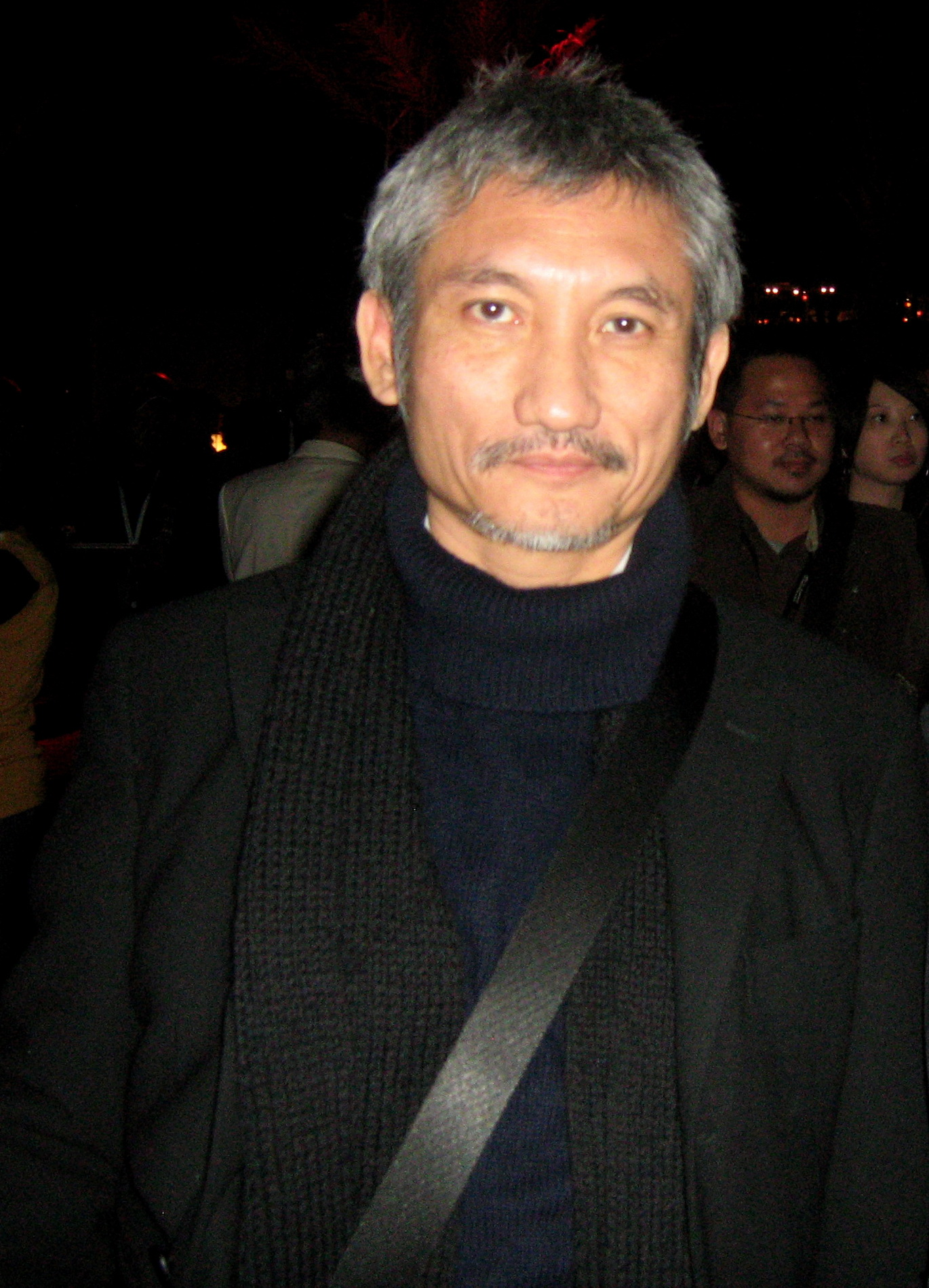
Tsui Hark, a Hong Kong director.

The 1980s and early 1990s saw seeds planted in the 1970s come to full flower: the triumph of Cantonese, the birth of a new and modern cinema, superpower status in the East Asian market, and the turning of the West's attention to Hong Kong film.

A cinema of greater technical polish and more sophisticated visual style, including the first forays into up-to-date special effects technology, sprang up quickly. To this surface dazzle, the new cinema added an eclectic mixing and matching of genres, and a penchant for pushing the boundaries of sensationalistic content. Slapstick comedy, sex, the supernatural, and above all action (of both the martial arts and cops-and-criminals varieties) ruled, occasionally all in the same film.

Some of the iconic films during this period include The Killer (1989), by John Woo, which is archetypal of the heroic bloodshed genre.

==== The international market ====
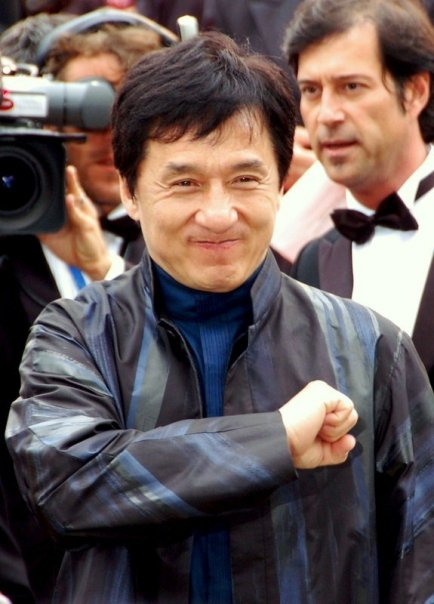
Jackie Chan

During this period, the Hong Kong industry was one of the few that thrived in the face of the increasing global dominance of Hollywood. It came to exert a comparable dominance in its own region of the world. Hong Kong product filled theatres and video shelves in places like Thailand, Singapore, Malaysia, Indonesia, and South Korea. Taiwan became as important a market to Hong Kong film as the local one. In the early 1990s the Taiwanese film industry came close to decline under the onslaught of Hong Kong imports. They found a foothold in Japan, with its well-funded cinema, and strong taste for American movies; Jackie Chan and Leslie Cheung being notable stars.

Almost accidentally, Hong Kong also reached further into the West, building upon the attention gained during the 1970s kung fu craze. Availability in Chinatown theatres and video shops allowed the movies to be discovered by Western film cultists attracted by their "exotic" qualities and excesses. An emergence into the wider popular culture gradually followed over the coming years.

==== Leaders of the boom ====
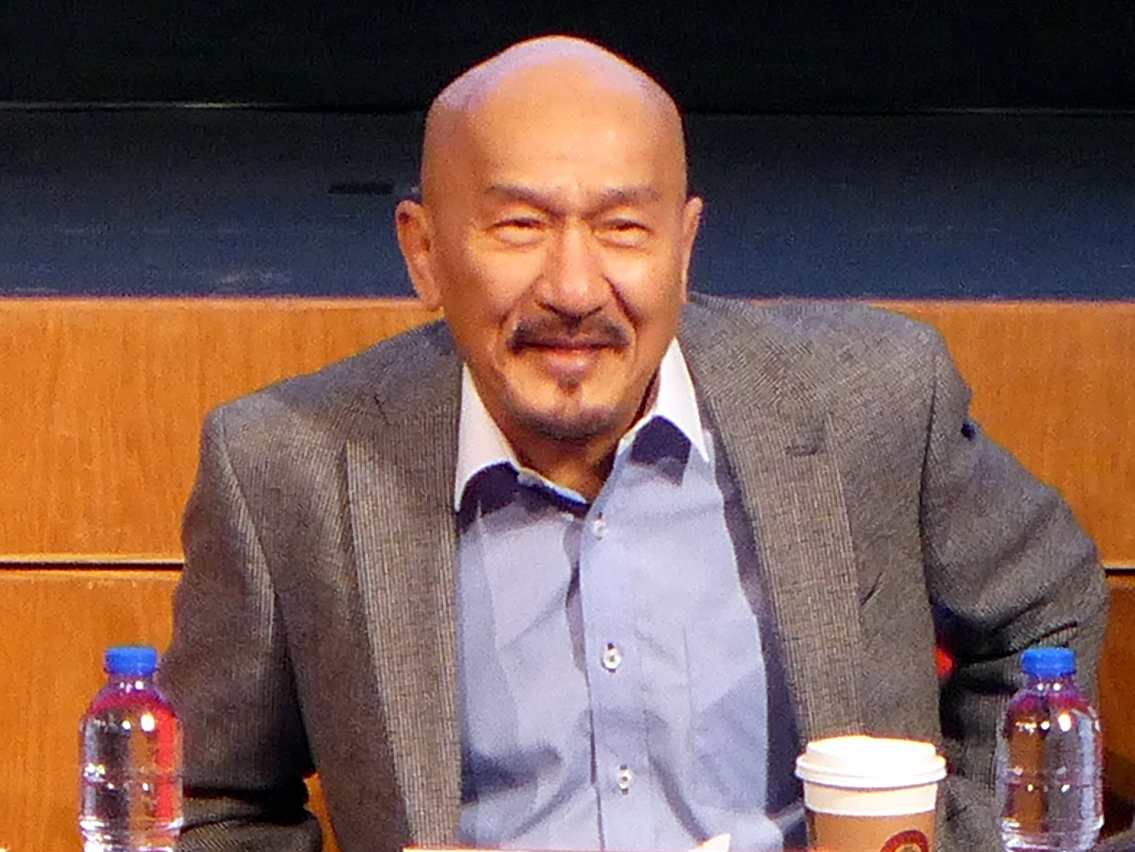
Karl Maka, a Hong Kong film producer, director, and comedy actor.

The trailblazer was production company Cinema City, founded in 1980 by comedians Karl Maka, Raymond Wong and Dean Shek. It specialised in contemporary comedy and action, slickly produced according to explicitly prescribed commercial formulas. The lavish, effects-filled spy spoof Aces Go Places (1982) and its numerous sequels epitomised the much-imitated "Cinema City style".

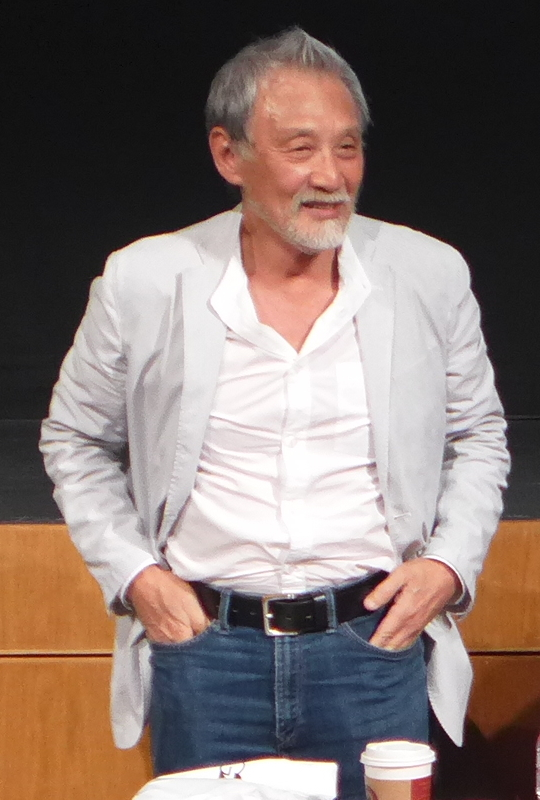
Dean Shek, a veteran Hong Kong feature film actor and film producer with over 92 films acting credits to his name.

Directors and producers Tsui Hark and Wong Jing were prominent figures of this era. Tsui, a key figure of the Hong Kong New Wave, represented the movement’s transition into mainstream commercial cinema, becoming noted as a trendsetter and technical experimenter.Mplus The even more prolific Wong was among the most commercially successful Hong Kong filmmakers of the boom years, known for a high output of widely marketed, audience-oriented genre films that often met with critical dismissal.

Other hallmarks of this era included the gangster or "Triad" movie trend launched by director John Woo, producer and long-time actor Alan Tang and dominated by actor Chow Yun-fat; romantic melodramas and martial arts fantasies starring Brigitte Lin; the comedies of stars like Cherie Chung and Stephen Chow; traditional kung fu movies dominated by Jet Li; and contemporary, stunt-driven kung fu action epitomised by the work of Jackie Chan.

==== Category III films ====
The government's introduction of a film ratings system in 1988 had a certainly unintended effect on subsequent trends. The "Category III" (adults-only) rating became an umbrella for the rapid growth of pornographic and generally outré films; however, while considered graphic by Chinese standards, these films would be more on par with movies rated "R" or "NC-17" in the United States, and not "XXX". By the height of the boom in the early 1990s, roughly half of the theatrical features produced were Category III-rated softcore erotica descended from the fengyue movies of the 1970s. A definitive example of a mainstream Category III hit was Michael Mak's Sex and Zen (1991), a period comedy inspired by The Carnal Prayer Mat, the seventeenth century classic of comic-erotic literature by Li Yu. Naked Killer (1992) also became an international cult classic.

The rating also covered a trend for grisly, taboo-tweaking exploitation and horror films, often supposedly based on true crime stories, such as Men Behind the Sun (1988), Dr. Lamb (1992), The Untold Story (1993) and Ebola Syndrome (1996). Films depicting Triad rituals would also receive a Category III rating, an example of this being Crime Story (1993) starring Jackie Chan.

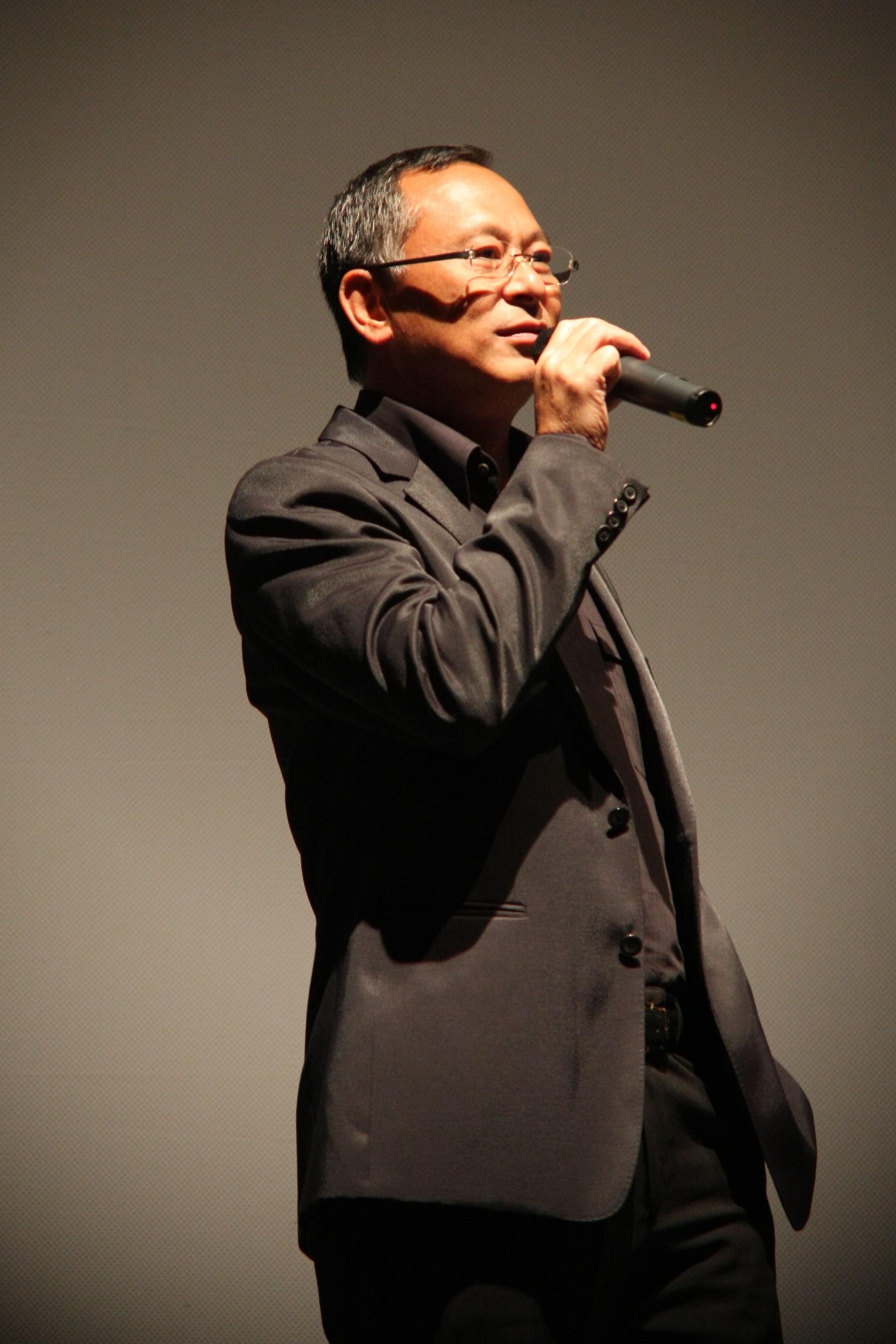
Johnnie To, a Hong Kong film director and producer.

Since the mid-1990s, the trend has withered with the shrinking of the general Hong Kong film market and the wider availability of pornography in home video formats. But in 2000s, three Category III movies: Election, its sequel, Election 2 (a.k.a. Triad Election), and Mad Detective, all directed by Johnnie To, still enjoyed surprising box office successes in Hong Kong.

==== Alternative cinema ====
In this landscape of pulp, there remained some ground for an alternative cinema or art cinema, due at least in part to the influence of the New Wave. Some New Wave filmmakers such as Ann Hui and Yim Ho continued to earn acclaim with personal and political films made at the edges of the mainstream.

The second half of the 1980s also saw the emergence of what is sometimes called a "Second Wave". These younger directors included names like Stanley Kwan, Clara Law and her partner Eddie Fong, Mabel Cheung, Lawrence Ah Mon and Wong Kar-wai. Like the New Wavers, they tended to be graduates of overseas film schools and local television apprenticeships, and to be interested in going beyond the usual, commercial subject matters and styles.

These artists began to earn Hong Kong unprecedented attention and respect in international critical circles and the global film festival circuit. In particular, Wong Kar-wai's works starring Takeshi Kaneshiro, Leslie Cheung, Tony Leung Chiu-Wai and Maggie Cheung in the 1990s have made him an internationally acclaimed and award-winning filmmaker.

=== Mid-1990s – present: Post-boom ===
==== The industry in crisis ====
During the 1990s, the Hong Kong film industry underwent a drastic decline from which it has not recovered. Domestic ticket sales had already started to drop in the late 1980s, but the regional audience kept the industry booming into the early years of the next decade. But by the mid-1990s, it went into freefall. Revenues were cut in half. By the decade's end, the number of films produced in a typical year dropped from an early 1990s high of well over 200 to somewhere around 100 (a large part of this reduction was in the "Category III" softcore pornography area.) American blockbuster imports began to regularly top the box office for the first time in decades. Ironically, this was the same period during which Hong Kong cinema emerged into mainstream visibility in the U.S. and began exporting popular figures to Hollywood.

Numerous, converging factors have been blamed for the downturn:

- The Asian financial crisis, which dried up traditional sources of film finance as well as regional audiences' leisure spending money.
- Overproduction, attended by a drop in quality control and an exhaustion of overused formulas.
- A costly early 1990s boom in building of modern multiplexes and an attendant rise in ticket prices.
- An increasingly cosmopolitan, upwardly mobile Hong Kong middle class that often looks down upon local films as cheap and tawdry.
- Rampant video piracy throughout East Asia.
- A newly aggressive push by Hollywood studios into the Asian market.

The greater access to the Mainland that came with the July 1997 handover to China, was not as much of a boom as hoped, and presented its own problems, particularly with regard to censorship.

The industry had one of its darkest years in 2003. In addition to the continuing slump, a SARS virus outbreak kept many theatres virtually empty for a time and shut down film production for four months; only fifty-four movies were made. The unrelated deaths of two of Hong Kong's famous singer–actors, Leslie Cheung, 46, and Anita Mui, 40, rounded out the bad news.

The Hong Kong Government, in April 2003, introduced a Film Guarantee Fund as an incentive to local banks to become involved in the motion picture industry. The guarantee operates to secure a percentage of monies loaned by banks to film production companies. The Fund has received a mixed reception from industry participants, and less than enthusiastic reception from financial institutions who perceive investment in local films as high risk ventures with little collateral. Film guarantee legal documents commissioned by the Hong Kong Government in late April 2003 are based on Canadian documents, which have limited relevance to the local industry.

==== Recent trends ====
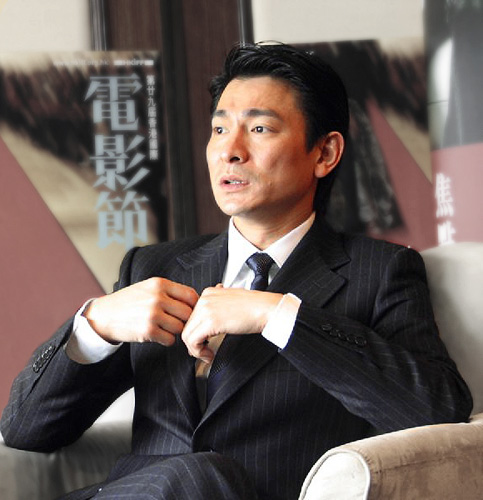
Andy Lau, a Hong Kong actor, singer, lyricist, and film producer. He has been one of Hong Kong's most commercially successful film actors since the mid-1980s, performing in more than 160 films while maintaining a successful singing career at the same time.

Efforts by local filmmakers to refinish their product have had mixed results overall. These include technically glossier visuals, including much digital imagery; greater use of Hollywood-style mass marketing techniques; and heavy reliance on casting teen-friendly Cantopop music stars. Successful genre cycles in the late 1990s and early 2000s have included: American-styled, high-tech action pictures such as Downtown Torpedoes (1997), Gen-X Cops and Purple Storm (both 1999), The Legend of Zu, Gen-Y Cops, and The Avenging Fist (all three 2001), the "Triad kids" subgenre launched by Young and Dangerous (1996–2000); yuppie-centric romantic comedies like The Truth About Jane and Sam (1999), Needing You... (2000), Love on a Diet (2001); and supernatural chillers like Horror Hotline: Big-Head Monster (2001) and The Eye (2002), often modelled on the Japanese horror films then making an international splash.

In the 2000s, there have been some bright spots. Milkyway Image, founded by filmmakers Johnnie To and Wai Ka-Fai in the mid-1990s, has had considerable critical and commercial success, especially with offbeat and character-driven crime films like The Mission (1999) and Running on Karma (2003). An even more successful example of the genre was the blockbuster Infernal Affairs trilogy (2002–2003) of police thrillers co-directed by Andrew Lau and Alan Mak (the Oscar-winning movie The Departed, was based on this movie). Comedian Stephen Chow, the most consistently popular screen star of the 1990s, directed and starred in Shaolin Soccer (2001) and Kung Fu Hustle (2004); these used digital special effects to push his distinctive humor into new realms of the surreal and became the territory's two highest-grossing films to date, garnering numerous awards locally and internationally. Johnnie To's two Category III movies: Election and Election 2 also enjoyed Hong Kong box office successes. Election 2 was even released in the US theatrically under the new title Triad Election and received very positive reviews in the United States, with a more than 90% "Fresh" rating on Rotten Tomatoes. New LGBT films such as City Without Baseball (2008), Permanent Residence (2009) and Amphetamine (2009) followed the success of earlier 1990s films such as Bugis Street (a 1995 Hong Kong–Singapore co-production), and Hold You Tight (1998).

Still, some observers believe that, given the depressed state of the industry and the rapidly strengthening economic and political ties among Hong Kong, mainland China and Taiwan, the distinctive entity of Hong Kong cinema that emerged after World War II may have a limited lifespan. The lines between the mainland and Hong Kong industries are ever more blurred, especially now that China is producing increasing numbers of slick, mass-appeal popular films. Predictions are notoriously difficult in this rapidly changing part of the world, but the trend may be towards a more pan-Chinese cinema, as existed in the first half of the twentieth century.

==== Censorship ====
In June 2021, the Hong Kong Film Censorship Authority OFNAA introduced a new national security policy. This law passed on 27 October 2021. It gives the chief secretary the power to revoke a film's licence if it is found to "endorse, support, glorify, encourage and incite activities that might endanger national security". Under the new law, the maximum penalties for showing unapproved films are three years in jail and a fine of HK$1 million. Critics like professor Kenny Ng and filmmaker Kiwi Chow voice concerns of its political censorship, spurring fears the new law would dampen the film industry.

In June 2022, The Dancing Voice of Youth was censored, and in August 2022, Losing Side of a Longed Place was censored. In October 2022, the OFNAA recommended the screening of The Dark Knight be cancelled. In October 2022, the OFNAA also banned The Lucky Woman from being screened due to protest scenes that took place at Taiwan's Presidential Office Building.

In April 2023, Wake in Silence failed to get approval from the OFNAA, allegedly because the film showed a flag that said "100% freedom."

In June 2023, more films were censored by the OFNAA at a local Hong Kong film festival. In June 2023, the OFNAA said that the Film Censorship Ordinance, which stipulates that films must be pre-approved by the OFNAA before public release, did not apply to films produced by the government.

== See also ==
Awards

- Golden Bauhinia Awards
- Hong Kong Film Awards
- Hong Kong Film Critics Society Award

Festivals

- Hong Kong International Film Festival
- Hong Kong Lesbian & Gay Film Festival

Genres and subgenres

- Bruceploitation
- Chopsocky
- Girls with guns
- Gods and demons fiction
- Gun fu
- Heroic bloodshed
- Hong Kong action cinema
- Jiangshi fiction
- Kung fu film
- Martial arts film
- Mo lei tau
- Wire fu
- Wuxia
- Xianxia
- Xuanhuan

Lists

- List of cinemas in Hong Kong
- List of films set in Hong Kong
- List of Hong Kong Category III films
- List of Hong Kong films

Movement

- Hong Kong New Wave

Rating

- Hong Kong motion picture rating system

Website

- Hong Kong Movie DataBase
