= Julie Yeh =

Chinese actress, singer and businesswoman

Julie Yeh Feng
- Chinese: 葉楓
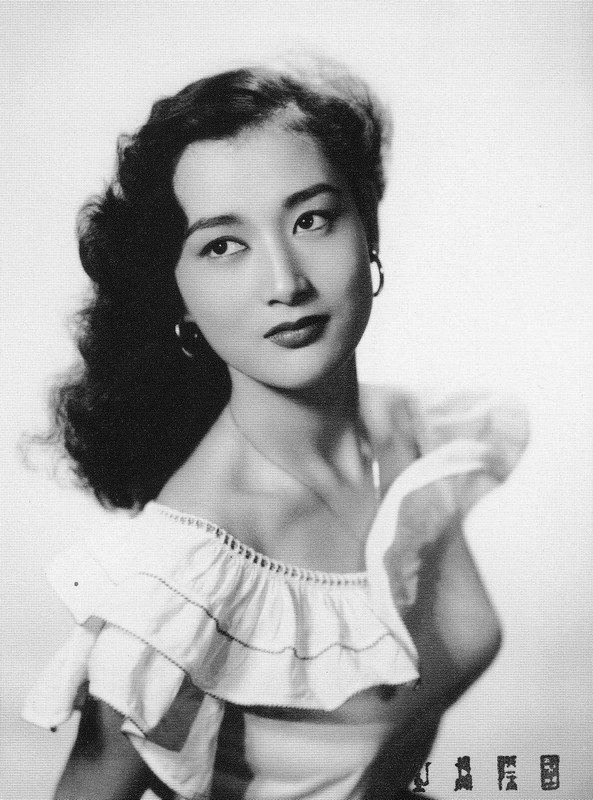
- Yeh prior to 1960
- Born: Wang Jiuling (王玖玲); October 19, 1937 (age 88); Hankou, Hubei, Republic of China
- Other names: Ye Feng, Yeh Feng, Yip Fung
- Occupations: Actress; singer
- Years active: 1957–1969
- Known for: Hong Kong cinema, Shidaiqu
- Notable work: Our Sister Hedy, Sister Long Legs
- Spouses: Chang Yang (m. 1961; div. 1965); Ling Yun (m. 1965; div. 1983)

Yeh Feng (Chinese: 葉楓; born 19 October 1937), also known as Julie Yeh Feng, is an actress, singer and businesswoman. She starred in various films throughout the 1950s and 1960s, and is considered to have been one of Hong Kong's biggest stars of the period.

== Biography ==
Yeh was born as Wang Jiuling in Hankou, Hubei, Republic of China. Yeh's family moved to Taiwan in 1948. She was cast in a 1954 film in Taiwan that never reached production, after which the directors Li Han-hsiang and Li Zuyong recommended her and she was signed to Motion Pictures and General Investment (MP&GI). Yeh made her screen debut in 1957, in the musical Our Sister Hedy, which tells the story of four sisters, and their sibling rivalries.

Yeh left MP&GI in 1962, after which she signed with the Shaw Brothers Studio, one of the largest production companies in Hong Kong. She retired in 1969, but made a cameo in frequent co-star Lin Cui's 1975 comedy. Yeh currently works as a businesswoman.

== Personal life ==
In 1961, Yeh married Chang Yang, an actor. In 1965, Yeh divorced from Chang Yang. Later Yeh married another actor Ling Yun, but Yeh divorced again in 1983.

== Filmography ==
=== Films ===
| Year | Title | Role | Notes/Ref. |
|---|---|---|---|
| 1957 | Our Sister Hedy (Chinese: 四千金) | Hung Heileon (孔希倫), Helen | |
| 1959 | Too Young to Love 二八佳人 | Mui Jizyu (梅意珠) | |
| 1959 | The Tragedy of Love 天長地久 | Kwan Jizan (關伊珍) | |
| 1959 | The Wayward Husband 桃花運 | Ding Hsiang (丁香) | |
| 1959 | Air Hostess 空中小姐 | Chu Hsin-chuan (朱心娟) | |
| 1959 | Miss Songbird 歌迷小姐 | Chang Lanwai (張蘭蕙) | |
| 1959 | Wedding Bells for Hedy | Hung Heileon (孔希倫) | |
| 1960 | Sister Long Legs 長腿姐姐 | Wu Tingting (胡亭亭) | |
| 1960 | Miss Secretary 人秘書艷史 | Lo Waifan (羅為芬) | |
| 1960 | Time Is Running Short 喋血販馬場 | Lei Siu-juk (李小玉) | |
| 1960 | The Iron Fist 鐵臂金剛 | Lei Ngonnei (李安妮) | |
| 1960 | Swindlers Delight 紅男綠女 | Jan Jamcau (殷吟秋) | |
| 1960 | Sleeping Beauty 睡美人 | Mimi (咪咪) | |
| 1961 | The Girl with the Golden Arm 賊美人 | Li Xiao-yu | |
| 1961 | Sun, Moon and Star: Part 1 星星月亮太陽(上) | Su Yanan | |
| 1961 | Sun, Moon and Star: Part 2 星星月亮太陽(下) | Su Yanan | |
| 1962 | It's Always Spring 桃李爭春 | Li Ailian | |
| 1962 | Come Rain, Come Shine 野花戀 | Chiang Su-ying | |
| 1962 | Love in Bloom 花好月圓 | Angel Amidst the Clouds | |
| 1963 | Mad About Music 鶯歌燕舞 | Bai Lihong | |
| 1964 | The Shepherd Girl 山歌戀 | Gu Xiuxiu | |
| 1964 | Please Remember Me 一曲難忘 | Nanzi (南子) | Screenplay by Eileen Chang. |
| 1964 | The Warlord and the Actress 血濺牡丹紅 | Tang Pei-hua | |
| 1965 | Pink Tears 痴情淚 | Bai Lilian | |
| 1966 | Poisonous Rose 毒玫瑰 | Jiang Feng | |
| 1966 | The Joy of Spring 歡樂青春 | Guest appearance | |
| 1968 | No Time for Love 游龍戲鳳 | | |
| 1969 | Unfinished Melody 碧海青天夜夜心 | Gao Xiu-xin | |
| 1969 | Farewell, My Love 春蠶 | Jiang Han | |
| 1975 | Sup Sap Bup Dup 十三不搭 | Cameo | |
