= The Empress Wu Tse-tien (1939 film) =

1939 film

The Empress Wu Tse-Tien
- Film poster
- Directed by: Fang Peilin
- Written by: Ke Ling
- Produced by: Zhang Shankun
- Starring: Gu Lanjun; Yin Xiucen; Huang Naishuang; Li Ming; Liang Xin
- Cinematography: Yu Xingsan
- Edited by: Xu Ming
- Music by: Huang Yijun
- Production company: Xinhua Film Company
- Release date: September 12, 1939 (China)
- Running time: 95 minutes
- Country: Republic of China (1912–1949)
- Language: Mandarin

The Empress Wu Tse-Tien (traditional Chinese: 武則天; simplified Chinese: 武则天; pinyin: Wǔ Zétiān) is a 1939 Chinese historical film based on the life of Wu Zetian, the only female emperor in Chinese history. Directed by Fang Peilin, the film starred Gu Lanjun as the titular character.

== Cast ==
- Gu Lanjun
- Yin Xiucen
- Huang Naishuang
- Li Ming
- Liang Xin
- Bai Hong
