= Zhuangzi Tests His Wife =

1913 Hong Kong film by Li Beihai

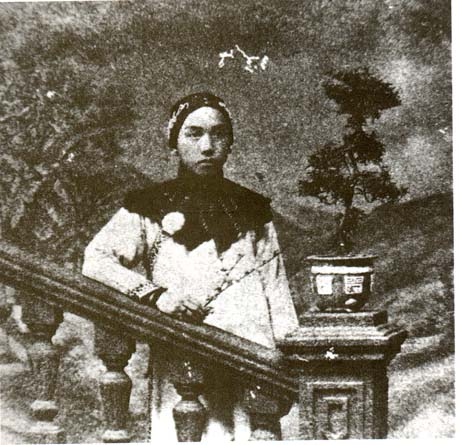
- Promotional still
- Directed by: Lai Man-Wai
- Written by: Lai Man-Wai
- Produced by: Lai Pak-hoi; Benjamin Brodsky
- Distributed by: Huamei
- Release date: 1913
- Country: Hong Kong
- Language: Silent

Zhuangzi Tests His Wife (Chinese: 莊子試妻; pinyin: Zhuangzi shi qi) is a 1913 Hong Kong drama film directed by Lai Man-Wai. It is the earliest feature film of Hong Kong cinema, and the only film made by the Huamei (Chinese-American) Studio, which was co-founded by Benjamin Brodsky, who had sold his Asia Film Company in Shanghai, and Lai Pak-hoi, Man-Wai's brother. The film was never screened in Hong Kong. Brodsky brought the film to the United States, and it became the first Hong Kong-produced fiction film to be shown in the United States. It is based on the zidishu play "The Butterfly Dream" written by Chunshuzhai. No known prints of the film still exist.

== Cast ==
Lai Man-Wai stars as the wife of Zhuangzi, and Lai Man-Wai's wife Yan Shanshan (1896–1951) became the first Chinese film actress, playing a servant girl.

- Lai Pak-hoi ... Zhuangzi
- Lai Man-Wai ... Zhuangzi's wife
- Yan Shanshan ... Servant Girl

== Background ==
Fourth century BCE Zhuangzi (or Zhuang Zhou), one of the two defining figures of Chinese Taoism, based his philosophy on all things changing, and the perception of truth depending on the context under which it exists. Throughout history, his teachings have been particularly favored by Chinese scholars and artists, many of whom were inspired by Zhuangzi's philosophy.

== In other media ==
Operatic versions of Zhuangzi Tests His Wife have been performed on stage by the Peking Opera and others.

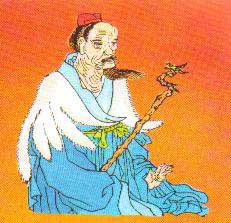
Zhuangzi

Most operatic versions end with Zhuangzi burying his wife after she commits suicide for being disloyal to her husband. But this version tackles the story from a different angle. While Tian Shi still ultimately kills herself, Zhuangzi turns her and himself into butterflies and then, eventually, into dust.

== See also ==
- Cinema of Hong Kong
- List of Hong Kong films
