= Fengtai Photographic Studio =

Chinese photographic studio

Fengtai Photography Studio
- Native name
- Traditional Chinese: 豐泰照相館
- Simplified Chinese: 丰泰照相馆
- Industry: Photography, film
- Founded: 1892
- Founder: Ren Qingtai (任慶泰)
- Defunct: 1909

Fengtai Photography Studio, founded by Ren Qingtai in Beijing, Qing dynasty, was the first Chinese photographic studio. It was also the earliest film production organization in China. It made at least eight Peking opera films, including Dingjun Mountain, China's first ever film.

Fengtai Photography Studio was located near a glass factory in southern Beijing. The business closed in 1909, when all machinery and equipment were destroyed in a fire.

== History ==
Fengtai Photography Studio opened in 1892, the 18th year of the Guangxu Emperor's reign. The owner Ren Qingtai (Chinese: 任慶泰) was from Faku County in Liaoning Province. Ren's ancestors were allegedly relatives of Nurhaci, the founder of the Later Jin dynasty (later, the Qing dynasty). In his youth, Ren Qingtai went to Japan to inspect the industry there and study modern physics and photography. He believed that photography had a promising future in China. After returning home, he opened the first Chinese photographic studio in Beijing, the Fengtai Photography Studio.

Photography had come to China in the 1880s. After Fengtai Studio opened, photography became a hobby for local residents in Beijing. The success of Fengtai Studio attracted many followers. A lot of other photographic studios opened on the street where Fengtai Studio was located. However, Fengtai Studio was the premier one in both size and technology. It had more than 10 employees, including famous photographers Liu Zhonglun (劉仲倫) and Xu Zihe (徐子和). Fengtai Photo Studio was famous for taking photos of Peking opera stars. Selling these photos was very profitable for the studio.

In 1905, 10 years after Auguste and Louis Lumière invented film, the enthusiasm of Chinese people for film was rising. Ren Qingtai opened a grand viewing cinema, called Daguanlou (大觀樓), near the Gate of China. At the time, only foreign films were available, and films were scarce. Ren wanted to make a film that would belong to the Chinese people. He bought a French-made wooden shell hand camera and 14 rolls of film, and invited celebrity Tan Xinpei, the most famous Peking opera actor at the time, to star in the short film Dingjun Mountain. Chinese audience warmly welcomed Dingjun Mountain, which combined western filming technology with Chinese opera to create a new art form. This film paved the way for the cinema of China. From 1906 to 1909, Fengtai Photography Studio invited Peking opera stars Yu Jusheng, Zhu Wenying, Xu Deyi and Yu Zhenting to appear in other films, such as Green Rock Mountain, Yanyang Tower, and more. Unfortunately, a fire in 1909 destroyed the Fengtai Studio machinery and equipment. The studio never recovered.

In the turmoils of the Cultural Revolution, the Chinese government advocated for destruction of traditional material and cultural heritage. Fengtai Studio ruins were almost destroyed during this period. In 1987, the land was converted into a kindergarten.

== Filmography ==
- Dingjun Mountain (1905) starring Tan Xinpei
- Changban Slope (長坂坡, 1905) starring Tan Xinpei
- Green Rock Mountain (青石山, 1906) starring Yu Jusheng (俞菊笙) and Zhu Wenying (朱文英)
- Yanyang Tower (艷陽樓, 1906) starring Yu Jusheng
- Golden Leopard (金錢豹, 1906) starring Yu Zhenting (俞振庭)
- White Water Shore (白水灘, 1907) starring Yu Zhenting
- Receiving Guan Sheng (收關勝, 1907) starring Xu Deyi (許德義)
- Weaving Cotton (紡棉花, 1908) starring Xiao Magu (小麻姑)
