= Ren Pengnian =

Chinese film director (1894–1968)

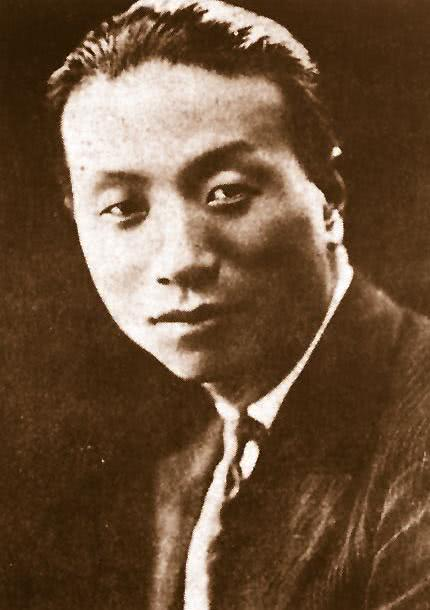
Ren in the 1920s

Ren Pengnian (Chinese: 任彭年; pinyin: Rén Péngnián; 1894 in Shanghai – 23 February 1968) was a Chinese film director who created the first standard-length narrative film in China. He started a film company in 1926 called Dongfang Film Studio.

Ren filmed over forty films during his career as a director, and also starred in some of them. His 1921 film Yan Ruisheng was the first narrative film in China to be of full-length. The movie was based on a real murder that occurred in Shanghai.

== Filmography ==
Films
Year	Title
1919	The Gambler
1919	The Dilemma
1920	Li Dashao
1920	Robbery en Route
1920	Fierce Backward Glance
1920	Winning Gold in the Wild Mountains
1920	Winning First Prize
1921	A Stupid Son-in-Law's Birthday Greetings
1921	The Woman of the Wicker House
1921	Han Da Catches a Thief
1921	Yan Ruisheng
1922	The Lotus Falls
1922	Talking Lost Property
1922	Righteousness before Family
1922	The Filial Woman's Soup
1922	An Empty Dream
1922	The Good Brothers
1923	Patriotic Umbrella
1923	By Pine and Cypress
1925	Misfortune in the Realm of Love
1925	Stepmother's Tears
1926	The Tale of Lijing
1926	A Workman's Wife
1927	The Dream of Red Mansions; directed with Yu Boyan
1927–1928	The Picture of the Eight Beauties of Jiaxing (3 parts); directed with Ren Yutian and Chen Hanping
1928	Fang Shiyu Takes Up the Challenge
1928	Through the Milky Way
1928	Di Qing Causes Uproar in the Wanhua Tower
1929	Uproar at Mount Wutai
1930	Strange Destiny in the Robber's Lair
1931–1932	Mistress of the Spear (6 parts)
1931	The Destruction of Fierce Tiger Town
1931	The Flying General
1931	The Heroine Black Peony
1933	A Real Man
1933	Her Heart
1933	Letter Written in Blood
1933	Secret in the Picture
1933	Evil Neighbor
1934	The Person in the Curtains
1935	Dazed and Crazy
