= Dingjun Mountain (film) =

1905 Chinese silent film

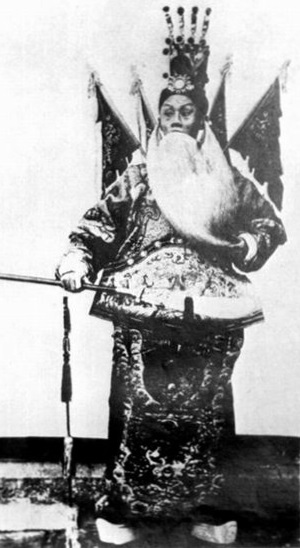

Chinese name
- Traditional Chinese: 定軍山
- Simplified Chinese: 定军山
Transcriptions
Standard Mandarin
- Hanyu Pinyin: Dìngjūn Shān
- Directed by: Ren Qingtai
- Starring: Tan Xinpei
- Cinematography: Liu Zhonglun
- Production company: Fengtai Photography
- Release date: 1905
- Country: China
- Language: Mandarin

Dingjun Mountain《定军山》(pinyin: Dìngjūn Shān) was a 1905 Chinese silent film directed by Ren Qingtai (任慶泰), also known as Ren Jingfeng (任景豐), who was assisted by his cinematographer Liu Zhonglun (劉仲伦). This film, made by Beijing's Fengtai Photography (豐泰照相館), constitutes the first Chinese film ever made.

The film consisted of a recording of Peking opera superstar Tan Xinpei dressed in the character Huang Zhong and singing some arias from the Peking opera of the same name. The play is a dramatised account of Battle of Mount Dingjun (219 AD) and is based on an episode in the 14th-century historical novel Romance of the Three Kingdoms.

The only print was destroyed in a fire in the late 1940s.

== In popular culture ==
Two films tell the (fictitious) events leading up to this film.

Shadow Magic, a 2000 U.S.-China co-production directed by Ann Hu, stars Xia Yu as Liu Jinglun (based on Liu Zhonglun), Liu Peiqi as Master Ren (based on Ren Qingtai), Li Yusheng as Tan Linmei (based on Tan Xinpei), Lü Liping as Ren's wife, and Li Bin as Empress Dowager Cixi. It also stars Jared Harris and Xing Yufei.

The 2005 Chinese film Dingjun Mountain (定軍山) was made to celebrate 100 years of Chinese cinema. Directed by An Zhanjun, it stars Yang Lixin as Ren Jingtai (based on Ren Qingtai), Tan Yuanshou as his great-grandfather Tan Xinpei, Hao Rongguang as Liu Zhonglun, Lü Zhong as Empress Dowager Cixi, and Qu Ning as Ren's wife. It also stars Liang Jingke.

== See also ==
- List of media adaptations of Romance of the Three Kingdoms
- List of lost Chinese films
