= The Dream of Red Mansions (1927 film) =

1927 Chinese film by Ren Pengnian and Yu Boyan

- A still from the film's booklet by the production company
- Chinese: 紅樓夢
- Directed by: Ren Pengnian; Yu Boyan
- Written by: Xu Bibo
- Cinematography: Zhou Tingxi; Wang Shizhen
- Edited by: Wen Yimin
- Production company: 复旦影片公司
- Release date: July 1927
- Country: China
- Language: Mandarin

The Dream of Red Mansions (simplified Chinese: 红楼梦; traditional Chinese: 紅樓夢; pinyin: Hónglóumèng) is a 1927 silent film adaptation of the novel by Cao Xueqin. It was directed by Ren Pengnian and Yu Boyan. It stars comedy actor Zhou Kongkong as Grandmother Jia.

The film is told from Grandmother Jia's perspective, and uses the "all just a dream" trope. It was cut into two parts, with a duration of roughly four hours. It is one of the earliest known film adaptations of the novel.

== Cast ==
- Zhou Kongkong as Grandmother Jia (cross-gender acting)
- Lu Jianfen as Jia Baoyu (cross-gender acting)
- Lu Jianfang as Lin Daiyu
- Wang Yiyi as Xue Baochai
- Yuan Yijun as Madam Wang
- Yi Banqian as Madam Jia
- Yi Yinqiao as Jia Zheng
- Wen Yimin as Jia Lian

== Notes ==
The film's negatives are considered lost. The film's plot summary and stills are preserved in a special edition booklet issue of the film by the production company, purchased at an auction.

Due to the lack of financing, the film uses modern props and costumes. The characters lounge on European style sofas and beds, and Daiyu occasionally wears Westernised skirts and high heels.

Film poster of The Dream of Red Mansions (1927)

The film premiered at Shanghai's Embassy Theatre, and was shown for four days. It received positive reviews from the media and the local entertainment industry.
