= Tan Xinpei =

Chinese Peking opera artist (1847-1917)

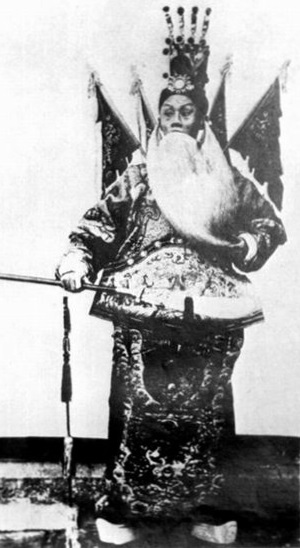
- Tan in a surviving still of Dingjun Mountain (1905)
- Born: April 23, 1847; Wuchang, Wuhan, Hubei, China
- Died: May 10, 1917 (aged 70); Beijing, China
- Occupations: Peking opera artist, actor
- Years active: 1905

Chinese name
- Traditional Chinese: 譚鑫培
- Simplified Chinese: 谭鑫培
Transcriptions
Standard Mandarin
- Hanyu Pinyin: Tán Xīnpéi

Tan Xinpei (23 April 1847 – 10 May 1917) was a Chinese Peking opera artist who specialized in sheng roles. A disciple of Cheng Changgeng, Tan Xinpei was undoubtedly the most important Peking opera performer of his generation. Some of his audio recordings have survived. He was also the only actor in China's earliest film Dingjun Mountain (1905).

A native of Wuhan, Hubei, Tan lived and worked for most of his life in Beijing after moving there with his family at the age of 10.

More than 40 of his family members have, over seven generations, worked as Peking opera performers, including his grandson Tan Fuying.

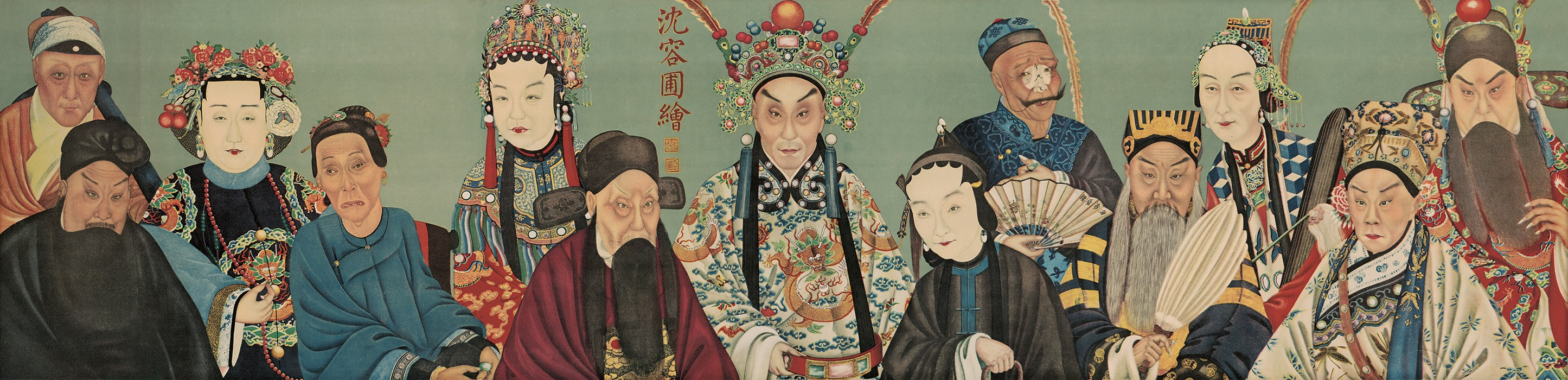
"Thirteen Masters of the Tongzhi and Guangxu Reigns" (同光十三絕), a late Qing dynasty painting by Shen Rongpu (沈容圃). Tan Xinpei is 2nd from right, dressed in the role of Huang Tianba.

== In popular culture ==
In the 1993 TV series Niu Zihou and Fu Lian Cheng (牛子厚與富連成), Tan Xinpei is portrayed by Peking opera artist Li Fuchun (李甫春). In the 2000 film Shadow Magic, the character Tan Linmei is clearly based on Tan Xinpei. He is played by Peking opera artist Li Yusheng (李玉声). In the 2005 film Dingjun Mountain (定軍山), Tan Xinpei is portrayed by his great-grandson Tan Yuanshou, Tan Fuying's son and a notable Peking opera artist in his own right.

== Filmography ==
Year	Title	Role	Notes
1905	Dingjun Mountain	Opera Lord	first Chinese film
1905	Chang ban po	Opera Lord	
