= Asia Film Company =

Chinese film production company

The Asia Film Company was the first film production company in China.

== History ==
The Asia Film Company was established in Shanghai in 1909 by Russian born Jewish American businessman Benjamin Brosky (1877–1960), and was the first company to produce dramatic films in China. They were all short films, which were the fashion at the time. The studio made four films in 1909 in Shanghai and Hong Kong, the only surviving one being Stealing a Roast Duck, shot in Hong Kong.

Brosky left Shanghai in 1912 and sold his assets to two other Americans, Yashell and Suffert. They continued the work of the company, collaborating with the Xinmin theatre company, led by Zheng Zhengqiu and Zhang Shichuan. The company was dissolved in 1914, when the First World War caused a shortage of film stock. Brosky went on to co-found, with Li Minwei, Hong Kong's first film studio, Huamei (Chinese-American), in 1913, which made a single film, Zhuangzi Tests His Wife. Brodsky left China in 1917 and briefly worked in Japan before returning to the United States where he became a theatre owner and changed his name to Borden.

== Films ==
The company's productions mainly consisted of actualities and comedy shorts. It produced The Difficult Couple in 1913, the first feature-length film made in China, which was about arranged marriage, directed by Zheng Zhengqiu and written by Zhang Shichuan.
