= Those Were the Days (1997 film) =

1997 Hong Kong film by Dick Cho

- Film poster
- Traditional Chinese: 精裝難兄難弟
- Simplified Chinese: 精装难兄难弟
- Hanyu Pinyin: Jīng Zhuāng Nán Xiōng Nán Dì
- Jyutping: Zing1 Zong1 Naan4 Hing1 Naan4 Dai6
- Directed by: Dick Cho
- Written by: Wong Jing
- Produced by: Natalis Chan
- Starring: Natalis Chan; Monica Chan; Gallen Lo; Maggie Cheung; Francis Ng; Shu Qi; Dayo Wong; Joyce Chan
- Cinematography: Tony Miu
- Edited by: Angie Lam; Eric Cheung
- Music by: Lincoln Lo
- Production company: Brilliant Idea Group
- Distributed by: Cameron Entertainment
- Release date: 28 August 1997
- Running time: 103 minutes
- Country: Hong Kong
- Language: Cantonese

Those Were the Days (Chinese: 精裝難兄難弟) is a 1997 Hong Kong comedy film directed by Dick Cho. The film is an adaptation of the TV series Old Time Buddy, which was produced by TVB, starring returning cast members from the series Gallen Lo, Maggie Cheung and Francis Ng, alongside new cast members Natalis Chan, Monica Chan, Shu Qi, Dayo Wong and Joyce Chan.

== Cast ==
- Natalis Chan as Walter Ngau Tat-wah
- Monica Chan as Chau
- Gallen Lo as Lee Kei
- Maggie Cheung Ho-yee as Ching Po-chu
- Francis Ng as Patrick Tse Yuen
- Shu Qi as Shiu Fong-fong
- Dayo Wong as Wong Ching-wai
- Joyce Chan as Ka-yin
- Lawrence Cheng as Ko
- Cheung Tat-ming as Cheung
- Chor Yuen as Movie
- Ha Ping as Fong-fong's Mother
- Vincent Kok as Wang Tin-lam
- Louis Yuen as Wong Shing
- Alvina Kong as Cheung's Wife
- Lee Kin-yan as Fat fat
- Wayne Lai as Law
- Law Kar-ying as Wong Fei-hung
- Lee Siu-kei as The Director
- Teresa Mak as Derra
- Yee Fan-wei as Kwan Mak-kei
- Kingdom Yuen as Po-chu's Mother
- Michael Tse as Man with lighter in Ku Wak Chai movie
