= Old Time Buddy =

Hong Kong television series

- Official poster
- 難兄難弟
- Genre: Comedy; Romance
- Written by: Chiu Ting-yuen; Fong Sai-keung; Tsang Bo-wah; Dai Tak-gwong
- Directed by: Chung Shu-kai; Mak Koon-chi; Chan Wai-koon; Cheng Gei-sing; Wong Ciu-ying
- Starring: Gallen Lo; Francis Ng; Jessica Hsuan; Maggie Cheung
- Theme music composer: Lincoln Law
- Opening theme: Old Time Buddy (難兄難弟) by Gallen Lo, Francis Ng, Jessica Hsuan and Maggie Cheung
- Country of origin: Hong Kong
- Original language: Cantonese
- No. of episodes: 25

Production
- Executive producer: Tommy Leung
- Producer: Chung Shu-kai
- Production location: Hong Kong
- Editor: Chiu Ting-yuen
- Camera setup: Multi camera
- Running time: 45 minutes
- Production company: TVB

Original release
- Network: TVB Jade
- Release: 23 June – 26 July 1997

Related
- Old Time Buddy: To Catch a Thief; Those Were the Days

Old Time Buddy
- Chinese: 難兄難弟
- Literal meaning: "Difficult Older Brother, Difficult Younger Brother"
Transcriptions
Standard Mandarin
- Hanyu Pinyin: nàn xiōng nàn dì
Yue: Cantonese
- Jyutping: naan4 hing1 naan4 dai6

Old Time Buddy (Chinese: 難兄難弟; Jyutping: naan4 hing1 naan4 dai6) is a 1997 Hong Kong period comedy television drama created and produced by TVB. The Chinese title translates to "brothers in hardship."

Old Time Buddy is set primarily in the 1960s and tells the story of two struggling young actors who end up becoming Hong Kong's iconic film idols. It stars Francis Ng, Gallen Lo, Jessica Hsuan, and Maggie Cheung Ho-yee, who portray characters based on screen idols Patrick Tse, Lui Kei, Josephine Siao, and Connie Chan respectively.

Original broadcast began on Hong Kong's TVB Jade channel from 23 June till 26 July 1997 every Monday through Friday during its 7:30pm to 8:30pm timeslot with a total of 25 episodes.

This drama is one of the three that witnessed the Hong Kong handover to China, the other two being A Kindred Spirit & Deadly Protection.

== Synopsis ==
Present day 1997, legendary Hong Kong actor Tse Yuen (Francis Ng) is to receive an achievement award. On a live broadcast interview he calls out his former friend Lee Kei (Gallen Lo) to show up at the film studio that night so that he can share his award with him. Lee Kei who happens to be passing by an electronic store sees his interview.

In 1964 Tse Yuen is an unambitious young man who lives in his family multi dwelled apartment. Each day before work he spies on Ah Jan, the herbal tea shop girl he has been in love with for a long time. He works as an inefficient dim sum waiter who is only able to hold on to his job because his boss's fat daughter likes him. She sexually harasses him daily, not wanting to offend her advances he has to climb out a window and down a fire escape to get off work each day. One day he sees a young man near the pier that he thinks is about to commit suicide, wanting to save him the two fall into the harbor. The man who was only picking up a racing ticket turns out to be his former classmate Lee Kei.

Lee Kei is a smart aleck who doesn't like hard labor and has a kind heart. Due to his kindness he gives up a job opportunity to someone more in need. His unemployed situation causes him to be evicted from the room he is renting. However, luck is on his side as that same day he encounters Yuen again and gets Yuen to take him in. Soon Yuen starts to regret running into Kei again as he thinks Kei is trying to steal Ah Jan and after following Kei's advice on how to bluntly reject his boss's fat daughter he is fired from his job. But when Kei helps set him up on a date with Ah Jan he is glad he took in Kei.

While searching for a job Kei encounters a man that tells him, he is a talent scout and that if he pays him $10HKD he will make him a movie star. After giving money to the talent scout the man disappears, a few days later he encounters the man again who doesn't remember Kei and tells Kei the same con. Kei chases the man home and finds out the con man is also a tenant of the Tse family. The con man turns out to have actual connections to the film studios and gets Kei and Yuen jobs as film extras when he is unable to repay the $10 he conned from Kei.

At the film studio, the two meet famous idols Cheng Po-chu (Maggie Cheung Ho-yee) and Siu Fong-fong (Jessica Hsuan). Kei and Yuen do not have good impressions of them as Yuen thinks Fong-fong is a stuck up spoiled movie star, while Kei thinks Po-chu is a dumb jinx since something bad always happens to him when she is around him. Their first day working at the film studio is disastrous. due to their inexperience as actors they accidentally destroy a movie set and is forced to work at the studio until the damages have been repaid.

When Yuen's relationship with Ah Jan begins to turn serious, her father finds out and forbids them from seeing each other again. In order to marry Ah Jan, Yuen begins to work hard, working multiple jobs, by day at the film studio and at night at a food stall so he can save up money to marry Ah Jan. Suddenly because of Ah Jan's father's gambling debt she is sold into indentured servitude in Malaysia, which leaves Yuen heartbroken. He uses his grief in his acting and starts getting lead roles which leads him to becoming a movie star. While Yuen's star is rising, Kei is at a standstill in his movie career due to him being selective of his roles.

== Cast ==
=== Main cast ===
- Gallen Lo as Lee Kei (李奇) - based on Lui Kei (呂奇)

Yuen's best friend and former classmate. He is an unemployed young man who likes to leech off of others. Homeless and jobless, he moves into Yuen's home and lives with his family. A chance encounter with swindler Fung Yan-gwan leads him to become a movie extra. Due to his good looks, Lee Kei gets offered bigger roles, but his stardom reaches a stalemate when he becomes more selective in his roles. He has an obvious crush on Siu Fong-fong initially dislikes Cheng Po-chu, as he often encounters bad things whenever she is around him. However, after seeing her kindness and innocence, he changes his opinion of her, and they grow closer.

- Francis Ng as Tse Yuen (謝源) - based on Patrick Tse (謝賢)

A kind, simple-minded young man with few ambitions in life except to marry his one true love, Jan. He gets fired as a dim sum restaurant waiter after upsetting his boss' daughter, who has a crush on him. When his best friend, Lee Kei, was offered to work as a movie extra, the jobless Yuen tags along. A lucky encounter with a famous director gets Yuen cast in his first lead role in a major feature film, costarring with the popular Siu Fong-fong. Yuen is a bad actor, but with advice from Fong-fong, he makes it through his first leading role.

- Jessica Hsuan as Siu Fong-fong (邵芳芳) - based on Josephine Siao (蕭芳芳)

An independent young women who likes to read, she is also a screen idol but outside of work she hides her movie star persona and helps out at her uncles dai pai dong. She likes Tse Yuen, but after hearing Yuen criticize her, she starts to hate him and fools him, often confusing him with her dual identity. But after realising his devotion to his girlfriend she starts to befriend him, and eventually falls for him.

- Maggie Cheung Ho-yee as Cheng Po-chu (程寶珠) - based on Connie Chan (陳寶珠)

A popular Hong Kong screen idol. She is naive and innocent due to her overly protective stage mom. She has a weakness for chocolate and food because of the strict diet her mother puts her on. She develops a crush on Tse Yuen, but her heart gets broken after she discovers Yuen and Siu Fong-fong's relationship. Because of this, she and Lee Kei become unlikely friends and they become soulmates.

=== Tse family ===
- Lau Kong as Tse Suen (謝信)

Tse Yuen's father. He is a righteous man who constantly instill integrity in his son.

- Yan Pak as Chan Dai-kam (陳帶金)

Tse Yuen's kind mother. Tse Suen's wife.

- Natalie Wong as Tse Fei-yin (謝飛燕)

Tse Yuen's younger sister. She works at a factory. Kiu Fung likes her but she likes Lee Kei.

=== Tse household tenants ===
- Jay Leung as Leung Yuk-wah 梁玉嬅 - based on Tina Ti (狄娜)

A night club hostess-prostitute who later becomes a soft-porn actress named Dik Wah (狄嬅).

- Peter Lai as Fung Yan-gwan (馮仁昆)

A swindler with connections to the film industry. After swindling Lee Kei out of HK$10 he is forced to get him a job as a film extra when he finds out they live in the same apartment.

- Chiu Hung as Dai Sek-gwong (大隻廣)

A sidewalk peddler who sells food with his wife. Chang Gai-ying's husband.

- Yu Mo-lin as Chang Gai-ying (倀雞英)

A sidewalk peddler who sells food with her husband. Dai Sek-gwong's wife.

- Tse Man-hin as Small kid Cheung (細路祥)

A pre-adolescence boy who rents the top of a bunk bed at the Tse home. He works as a shoeshine boy.

=== Tsang family ===
- Leung Bo-ching as Tsang Fung-giu (曾鳳嬌)

Siu Fong-fong's mother who is also her manager.

- Chun Wong as Tsang Siu-dong (曾小東)

Siu Fong-fong's uncle and the owner of the dai pai dong she helps out when she is out of her movie star persona.

- Lily Liew as Nun jie (銀姐)

The Tsang household maid.

=== Cheng family ===
- Choi Kwok-hing as Cheng Sum (程森)

Cheng Po-chu's father who is aware that his wife Luk Cheung-mei is too overbearing on their daughter.

- Alice Fung So-bor as Luk Cheung-mei (陸薔薇)

Cheng Po-chu's mother. She is an overbearing stage mother who puts her daughter on a strict diet and controls every aspect of her life.

- Kenneth Chan as Cheng Ka-kit (程家傑)

Cheng Po-chu's older brother.

- Chan Yin-hong as Ho jie (好姐)

The Cheng household maid.

=== Law Si Film Studio actors ===
- Jerry Lamb as Kiu Fung (喬峰)

An Oxford University educated young man who is from a wealthy family. He works as a film extra so when he mentions his privileged background everyone thinks he is delusional. He likes Tse Yuen's younger sister Tse Fei-yin but she doesn't like him because of his looks and thinks he is lying about his wealthy background.

- Kingdom Yuen as Yam Kin-wai (任建威) - based on Yam Kim-fai (任劍輝)

A Cantonese opera singer who likes to play male characters. Bak Yuk-sin is her opera partner and constant companion.

- Florence Kwok as Bak Yuk-sin (白玉仙) - based on Bak Sheut-sin (白雪仙)

A Cantonese opera singer who is the constant partner and companion of Yam Gin-wai. She and Gin-wai like to play mahjong with Cheng Po-chu and Siew Fong-fong's mothers.

- Ken Lok as Tsui Gei (徐基)

A matinee idol actor who is a womanizer. He fancies Cheng Po-chu's innocence and naiveness and tries to take advantage of her.

- Samuel Yau as Actor (演員)

=== Law Si Film Studio staff ===
- Albert Law as Boss Law (羅老闆)

The film studio owner.

- Ceci So as Mrs. Law (羅太)

The film studio owner's wife.

- Johnson Law as Lung Gon (龍干)

A film director who directs Tse Yuen's first leading role.

- Bruce Li as Director Lee (李導演)

The first director to hire Tse Yuen and Lee Kei as film extras.

- Sunny Tai as Assistant Director (左源)

Assistant director to Director Lee.

- Lee Lung-kei as Cho Fat-wah (曹發華) - based on Cho Tat-wah (曹達華)

A film director and actor with a gambling problem.

- Law Gwok-wai as Lee Ciu (李超)

Owner of the canteen at the film studio. He is only nice to the big name stars.

=== Extended cast ===
- Joyce Tang as Chan Yuk-chun (陳玉珍)

Tse Yuen's love interest. The daughter of the herbal tea shop owner downstairs from Yuen's home. Yuen's has been in love with her for a longtime but too shy to approach her. Her father is an addictive gambler who physically abuses her. When she and Yuen start dating her father is highly against their relationship because of Yuen's poor background. Just when Yuen is working hard to save money to marry her she and her father flee Hong Kong in order to escape her father's gambling debt. She later marries someone else that treats her kindly.

- Cheng Fan-sang as Single eye Bou (單眼保)

Ah Jan's abusive father and owner of the herbal tea shop downstairs of Tse Yuen's home. He does not approve of his daughter dating Yuen because of his poor background. Due to his heavy gambling debts, him and his daughter are forced to flee Hong Kong.

- Karsin Bak as Wong Lan-hing (王蘭卿) - based on Lydia Shum (沈殿霞) but name is similar to Cantonese opera singer Tam Lan-hing (譚蘭卿)

The fat daughter of the dim sum restaurant owner Tse Yuen worked at in the beginning. She has a huge crush on Yuen and uses her authority as his boss's daughter to drag him on dates with her. When Yuen bluntly rejects her, he is fired from the restaurant.

- Wong Son as Wong Bak-man (王百萬)

Owner of the dim sum restaurant Tse Yuen worked at in the beginning. He spoils his daughter Wong Lan-hing and lets Tse Yuen off the hook at her request even though he is aware that Yuen is an inefficient worker.

- Ma Ching-yee as Yu Sau-chau 于秀秋 - based on Yu So-chow (于素秋)
- Kwan Ho-wai as Ah Choi (阿財)
- Yu Tin-wai as Commissioner (部長)
- Fung Siu-san as Lin Jo (蓮組)
- English Tang as Nga Dou (亞杜)
- Ng Wai-san as Factory girl (工廠妹)
- Chan Chor-kiu as Factory girl (工廠妹)
- Lui Wing-yee as Factory girl (工廠妹)
- Joseph Yeung as Ng Gor-chi (吳佐治)
- Chan Min-leung as Brother On (安哥)
- Tam Yut-ching as Kam Dil-tung (金吊桶)
- Sun Yan-ming as Small time burglar (小偷)
- Ling Hon as Watch repairman (錶佬)

== Reception and Sequel ==
Old Time Buddy was a rating success, spawning the sequel Old Time Buddy - To Catch a Thief and inspiring the theatrical film Those Were the Days starring Natalis Chan. Maggie Cheung Ho-yee was praised of her uncanny resemblance to Connie Chan. Gallen Lo also received praises for his spot on impression of Lui Kei and won his first TVB Anniversary Award for Best Actor.

== Awards and nominations ==
Year	Award	Category	Nominee	Result
1997	TVB Anniversary Awards	Best Drama	Old Time Buddy	Won
1997	TVB Anniversary Awards	Best Actor	Gallen Lo	Won
1997	TVB Anniversary Awards	Best Actor	Francis Ng	Nominated
1997	TVB Anniversary Awards	Best Actress	Maggie Cheung Ho-yee	Nominated
1997	TVB Anniversary Awards	Best Actress	Jessica Hsuan	Nominated
1997	TVB Anniversary Awards	Best On-Screen Couple	Francis Ng, Jessica Hsuan	Nominated
1997	TVB Anniversary Awards	Most Comedic On-Screen Duo	Gallen Lo, Maggie Cheung Ho-yee	Nominated
