= List of Hong Kong films of 1959 =

A list of films produced in Hong Kong in 1959:

== 1959 ==
Title	Director	Cast	Genre	Notes
1959
19 Heroes of the Green Mountain	Tu Guangqi			
48 Hours in Escape	Evan Yang			
A Stroke of Romance for Mr. Wong	Wong Hok-Sing	Sun-Ma Sze-Tsang, Fung Wong-Nui, Suet Yim-Mui, Tam Lan-Hing, To Sam-Ku, Hui Ying-Ying	Comedy	
The Adventure of the 13th Sister	Li Han Hsiang			
Air Hostess	Evan Yang			
All in the Family	Wong Tin Lam			
Appointment with Death	Yan Jun			
Battle of the Sexes				
A Beancurd Shih Sze	Bu Wancang			
The Beautiful Ghost's Grievance	Lee Sun-fung			
Beauty Slain by the Sword	Ng Wui	Yim-hing Law		
Besieged	Chow See Luk			
Black Gold	Baai Yi			
Calendar Girl	Doe Ching	Helen Li Mei, Diana Chang Chung-Wen, Peter Chen Ho	Musical	
For Better, for Worse	Yueh Feng	Helen Li Mei, Yang Chang, Feng Su, Connie Chan	Drama	
Daughter of a Grand Household (aka The Missing Cinderella)	Ng Wui	Cheung Ying, Teresa Ha Ping, Leung Sing-Bo, Lam Kwan-San, Tam Lan-Hing, Lai Cheuk-Cheuk, Tai Sang-Po, Ko Wai-Lan, Wong Hon, Fung Wai-Man, Gam Lau, Lai Man	Comedy	
The Fake Marriage (aka Great Pretender)	Lo Duen	Chow Chung, Pak Yan, Lui Sek-Kwai, Wong Man-Lei, Lai Man, Helena Law Lan, Fong Hing, Fung Wai-Man	Comedy	
The Kingdom and the Beauty	Li Han-hsiang			
Lady Xue Yan	Chu Kei	Tang Pik-wan, Tam Sin-hung	Cantonese opera	
The Legend of Purple Hairpin	Lee Tit			
Money (aka Qian)	Ng Wui	Ng Cho-Fan, Lee Ching, Mui Yee, Cheung Ying, Pak Yin, Cheung Wood-Yau, Wong Man-Lei, Lam Kwan-San, Lam Siu, Heung Hoi, Yung Siu-Yi, Wong Ling, Ma Shuk-Kau, Mui Lan, Yip Ping, Wong Hang, Cheung Ho, Tai Sang-Po, Chu Yau-Ko, Helena Law Lan, Wong Hon, Lam Yuk, Tang Cheung, Go Chiu	Comedy	
Orchid in the Storm (aka Twilight of Love)	Chor Yuen	Patrick Tse, Nam Hung, Kong Suet, Ngok Man, Sze-Ma Wah-Lung, Ma Siu-Ying, Leung Suk-Hing, Yeung Yip-Wang, Gam Lui, Yung Yuk-Yi, Cheng Man-Ha, Lai Man	Drama	
Our Dream Car	Evan Yang	Chang Yang, Grace Chang, Kelly Lai Chen, Helena Law Lan, Ma Hsiao-Nung, Lai Man	Mandarin Comedy	
The Road (aka One Mind, One Heart, Road, Lo, Lu)	Ng Wui	Ng Cho-Fan, Cheung Wood-Yau, Pak Yin, Lam Kwan-San, Tsi Law-Lin, Wong Man-Lei, Lee Ching, Mui Yee, Sek Kin, Do Ping, Ng Wui, Helena Law Lan, Law Man, Lam Wah, Cheung Ho, Suen A-Foo, Au Ngok, Kwok Siu-Chuen, Fung Ming, Go Chiu, Tang Man, Wong Kung-Miu	Drama War	
Story of the White-Haired Demon Girl	Lee Fa	Yim-hing Law, Cheung Ying	Wuxia, romance	
Sword of Blood and Valour 2	Lee Sun-fung	Cho Tat Wah, Sheung-Koon Kwan-Wai, Chan Tsui-Ping	Wuxia	
Wedding Bells for Hedy	Doe Ching	Julie Yeh Feng, Mu Hong	Romance Drama	
