= Old Time Buddy: To Catch a Thief =

1998 Hong Kong period romantic comedy television drama

- Official poster
- Also known as: Old Time Buddy 2
- 難兄難弟之神探李奇
- Genre: Period drama Romantic comedy Mystery
- Written by: Bau Wai-chung; Cheung Siu-fong; Cat Kwan; Tsang Bo-wah; Chow Siu-fong; Szeto Kam-Yuen
- Directed by: Chan Wai-koon; So Man-chung; Wong Ciu-ying; Mak Koon-chi; Wong kwok-koon Man Wai-hung; Chung Shu-kai
- Starring: Gallen Lo; Gordon Lam; Maggie Cheung; Elaine Ng
- Theme music composer: Shunsuke Kikuchi
- Opening theme: Se Ma Ru by Gallen Lo and Maggie Cheung
- Country of origin: Hong Kong
- Original language: Cantonese
- No. of episodes: 25

Production
- Executive producer: Tommy Leung
- Producer: Chung Shu-kai
- Production location: Hong Kong
- Editors: Bau Wai-chung; Chow Yuk-ming
- Camera setup: Multi camera
- Running time: 45 minutes
- Production company: TVB

Original release
- Network: TVB Jade
- Release: 3 August – 4 September 1998

Related
- Old Time Buddy

Old Time Buddy: To Catch a Thief
- Chinese: 難兄難弟之神探李奇
- Literal meaning: "Difficult Older Brother, Difficult Younger Brother-Detective Lee Kei"
Transcriptions
Standard Mandarin
- Hanyu Pinyin: nàn xiōng nàn dì zhī shén tàn lǐ qí
Yue: Cantonese
- Jyutping: naan4 hing1 naan4 dai6 zi1 san1 taam1 lei5 kei4

Old Time Buddy: To Catch a Thief (Chinese: 難兄難弟之神探李奇; Jyutping: naan4 hing1 naan4 dai6 zi1 san1 taam1 lei5 kei4; literally "Difficult Older Brother, Difficult Younger Brother-Detective Lee Kei") is a 1998 Hong Kong period romantic comedy television drama created and produced by TVB, starring Gallen Lo, Gordon Lam, Maggie Cheung, Elaine Ng as the main cast. The series is an indirect sequel to 1997's Old Time Buddy. Filming took place in early 1998 entirely on location in Hong Kong. Original broadcast began on Hong Kong's TVB Jade channel 3 August till 4 September 1998 every Monday through Friday during its 7:30 to 8:30 pm timeslot with a total of 25 episodes.

Although it is the second installment of the Old Time Buddy series the story and characters have no connections to the first series. While the first series focuses on Hong Kong film industry in the 1960s, the second series is adapted from plots of 1960s Hong Kong detective mystery films such as The Black Rose (1965) starring the real life Connie Chan.

== Synopsis ==
Lee Kei is a righteous cop in Hong Kong during the 1960s, a rarity among his peers. He goes undercover to find the infamous cat-burglar "Black Rose", who has escaped capture for over twenty years. His first clue leads him to a nightclub, where he is reunited with Tse Sei, a slick talent manager and Kei's former classmate. Sei is in some trouble for not having paid the triad's talent their fee so Kei allows him to stay with him.

Later, Kei's corrupt supervisor discovers Kei's undercover operation. He gives Kei one month to find the "Black Rose" or he will fire him. When Kei returns home, he finds it burnt down by the triads, who were looking for Sei. Having caused all this trouble, Sei lets Kei live at his uncle's home. Sei's uncle works at an amusement park and live together with all the employees in the same apartment. The other tenants include brassy girl Siu Fong-fong, who tends the coin toss game booth at the park, and martial artists Cheng Po-chu and her mother. At the amusement park, Kei finds similarities between Cheng's acts and the martial arts used by the "Black Rose". He suspects that Cheng's mother is the "Black Rose" and decides to keep a close eye on the duo.

== Cast ==
=== Main cast ===
- Gallen Lo as Lee Kei (李奇) - based on Lui Kei 呂奇
- Gordon Lam as Tse Sei (謝四) - based on Patrick Tse 謝賢 whose nickname is Sei Gor 四哥
- Maggie Cheung Ho-yee as Cheng Po-chu (程寶珠) - based on Connie Chan 陳寶珠
- Elaine Ng as Siu Fong-fong (邵芳芳) - based on Josephine Siao 蕭芳芳

=== Chung apartment tenants ===
- Chow Chung as Siu Chung (邵聰)
- Suet Nei as Ching Seung-seung (程雙雙)
- Kingdom Yuen as Ng Yan-lai (吳恩麗) - based on Ng Kwun-lai 吳君麗
- Chun Wong as Tse Ping (謝平)
- Jerry Lamb as Siu Ka-ming (邵家明) - based on James Wong 黃霑
- Jay Leung as "Lulu" Leung Kum-dai (梁金娣)
- Rachel Poon as Ng Yim-fong (吳艷芳) - based on Anita Mui 梅艷芳
- Gladys Ho as Ng Oi-fong (吳愛芳) - based on Ann Mui 梅愛芳

=== Hong Kong Police ===
- Gregory Charles Rivers as Officer Sze (史sir)
- Choi Kwok-Hing as Lok Kung (駱恭)
- Annabelle Lau as Lok Bik-gei (駱碧姬)
- Felix Lok as Lui King (雷勁) - based on Lui Lok 呂樂
- Wilson Tsui as Ngan Bun (顏彬)

=== Extended cast ===
- Joyce Tang as Lina Yiu (姚麗娜)
- Ken Lok as Robert
- Ben Wong as Tang Hong-wing (鄧康榮) - based on Alan Tang 鄧光榮
- Kwan Ching as Yu Siu-yuen (于小元) - based on Yu Jim-yuen 于占元
- Chiu Hung as Snake Man (蛇佬)
- Man Kit-wan as Lai Jan (麗珍)
- Wong San as Chan Lo-shu (陳老鼠)
- Cheung Ying-choi as Chan Chung-shu (陳松鼠)
- Yu Ming as Uncle Lam (林伯)
- Samson Yeung as Teacher Komuro (小室老師) - based on Tetsuya Komuro (小室哲哉)
- Kwok Fung as Tang Gin (鄧堅)
- Johnson Law as White Clouds (白雲)
- Pak Yan as Black Wildcat (黑野貓)
- Lily Leung as Wong Ang (黃鶯)
- Alice Fung So-bor as Female killer 女殺手
- Helena Law as Muk Lan-fa (木蘭花)
- Lily Li as Muk Sau-jan (木秀珍)
- Celia Sie as Ding Ling (丁鈴)

== Development and casting ==
- A sequel to 1997 Old Time Buddy was created due to high ratings and positive reception of the first series. However the sequel was poorly received with low ratings and the series was not continued.
- The role of Tse Yuen/Sei originated by Francis Ng was re-cast with Gordon Lam, as Ng had left TVB to concentrate on film roles.
- The role of Siu Fong-fong originated by Jessica Hsuan was re-cast with Elaine Ng, as Hsuan had an infamous fall out with Maggie Cheung during the filming of the first series.
- The opening theme Se Ma Ru is a reprisal of Let's Go!! Rider Kick, the main theme of Kamen Rider.
