= Air Hostess (disambiguation) =

An air hostess is a female flight attendant.

Air Hostess may also refer to:

- "Air Hostess" (song), a 2004 song by Busted
- Air Hostess (1933 film), written by Keene Thompson
- Air Hostess (1949 film) a drama
- Air Hostess (1959 film), or Kong zhong xiao jie, a Hong Kong film of 1959
- Air Hostess (1980 film), a 1980 Indian Malayalam-language film by P. Chandrakumar
- Air Hostess, a 1986 Hindi TV series on DD National
