= Natalie Wong =

Hong Kong actress (born 1975)

- Born: 15 July 1975 (age 50); Hong Kong
- Years active: 1994-2013
- Partner: Louis Koo (1994-2001)
- Awards: Miss Hong Kong Pageant; 1994 Miss Photogenic

Chinese name
- Traditional Chinese: 黃𨥈瑩
- Simplified Chinese: 黄𨥈莹
- Jyutping: Wong^{4} Gei^{2} Jing^{4}
Transcriptions
Standard Mandarin
- Hanyu Pinyin: Huáng Jìyíng
Yue: Cantonese
- Jyutping: Wong^{4} Gei^{2} Jing^{4}

Natalie Wong Kei-Ying (Chinese name: 黃𨥈瑩, sometimes credited as 黃紀瑩 or 黃釲瑩) (born on 15 July 1975) is a Hong Kong actress formerly affiliated with TVB.

== Miss Hong Kong start ==
Wong entered the Miss Hong Kong Pageant in 1994 while studying business in college. From the start she was deemed a favourite by the Hong Kong media, and she nabbed the Miss Photogenic award early on in the semi-finals. However, due to her average performance in the finals, she lost her bid for the crown to winner Halina Tam (譚小環), first runner-up Annamarie Wood (活麗明), and second runner-up Theresa Lee (李綺紅), placing in the top five.

== Career ==
Due to her popularity during the contest, TVB quickly signed with her and cast her as one of the leading female roles in the sitcom Happy Harmony (餐餐有宋家), which aired from October 1994 to March 1995. With below average acting talent, she went on to play second female leads in subsequent TVB dramas.

In 1998, Wong was sent to host the long-running infotainment show, K-100. Because of the hosting duties, she was not able to take on any acting roles while she hosted. Due to the lack of exposure of TVB dramas during this time, her popularity quickly decreased. Upon completing her duties on K-100 in 2000, she filmed Prison on Fire - Plaintive Destiny 監獄風雲之夜囚 as the female lead and continued to take roles in TVB dramas. However, the roles offered to her were mostly minor ones. Only until 2006 have roles for Wong been greater in value, with her most recent being a major supporting role in To Grow with Love (肥田囍事) alongside Myolie Wu and Andy Hui. Because of the hosting exposure from K-100, Wong is regularly assigned to emcee live events and galas.

In 2011, Wong declined to renew her contract with TVB and left the entertainment sector, with her final role being The Hippocratic Crush.Nonetheless, she parted with TVB on good terms and has stated that she would consider filming again if the script is good. She has made public appearances around Asia and participates in GVG HK promotional events.

Wong currently works in the beauty and cosmetics sector.

== Name ==
The Chinese character, "𨥈"

The middle character, 𨥈, is an old Chinese scripture meaning royalty and is not readily available in most Chinese typing software. In fact, the character was only recently available as an add-on to the Unicode software Extension-B package. Therefore, a lot of media has just used the character "紀" (which has the same pronunciation) or incorrectly use a similar looking character "釲" (which is pronounced differently) in place of the original character.

== Selected filmography ==
=== Television ===
- 1994–1995 Happy Harmony 餐餐有宋家
- 1995 Mutual Affection 河東獅吼
- 1995 Money Just Can't Buy 天降財神
- 1996 Mystery Files 迷離檔案
- 1997 Old Time Buddy 難兄難弟
- 1997 The Demi-Gods and Semi-Devils 天龍八部
- 2000 Love Without Boundaries 緣份無邊界
- 2000 Street Fighters 廟街•媽•兄弟
- 2002 Let's Face It 無考不成冤家
- 2002 Eternal Happiness 再生緣
- 2002 Square Pegs 戇夫成龍
- 2003 Not Just A Pretty Face 美麗在望
- 2004 Wars of In-laws 我的野蠻奶奶
- 2005 Just Love 老婆大人
- 2006 La Femme Desperado 女人唔易做
- 2006 To Grow with Love 肥田囍事
- 2007 Ten Brothers 十兄弟
- 2008 When a Dog Loves a Cat 當狗愛上貓
- 2009 The Winter Melon Tale 大冬瓜
- 2009 A Chip Off the Old Block 巴不得爸爸
- 2012 The Hippocratic Crush On Call 36小時

=== Film ===
- 1997 03:00AM 夜半3點鐘
- 1998 T.H.E. Professionals 職業大賊
- 1998 Troublesome Night 3 陰陽路3之升棺發財
- 2001 Prison on Fire - Plaintive Destiny 監獄風雲之夜囚

=== Television presenting ===
- 1998-2000 K-100

Awards and achievements
Miss Hong Kong
Preceded by Emily Lo (in 1992) 盧淑儀	Miss Photogenic; 1994	Succeeded by Sofie Rahman 李嘉慧
