= Schools for Chinese opera =

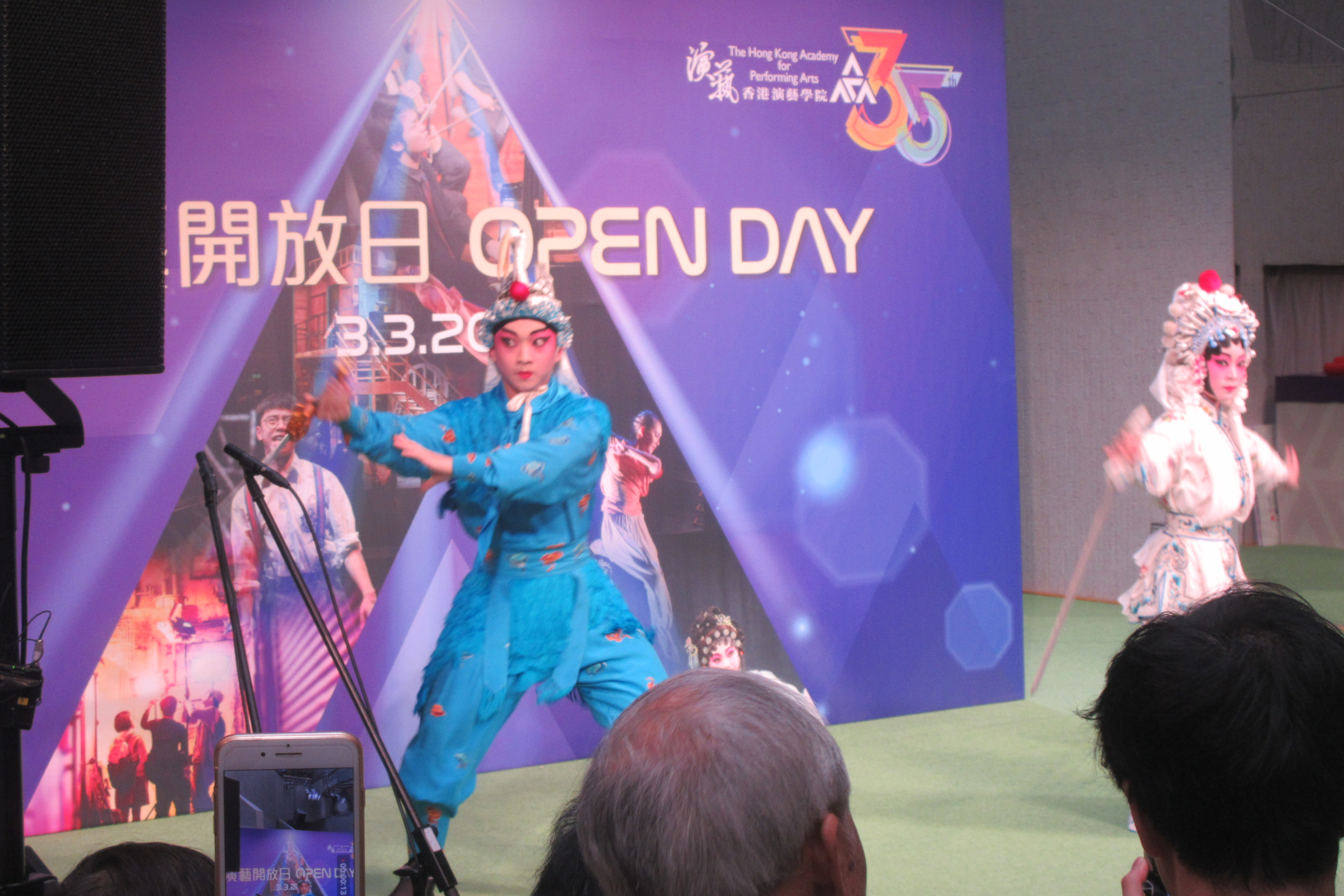
Cantonese opera students from the Hong Kong Academy for Performing Arts perform in 2019

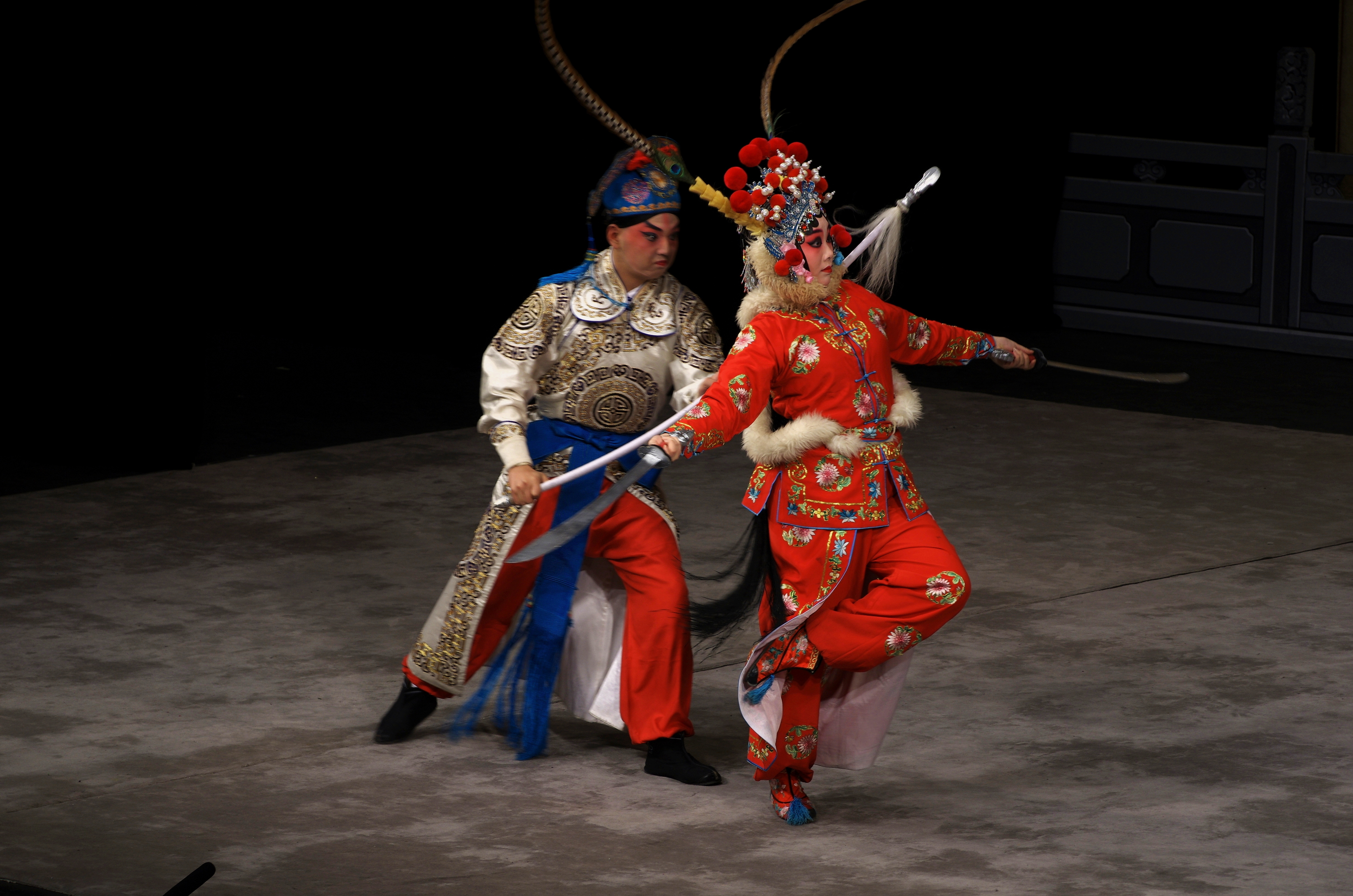
Kunqu students from the Shanghai Theatre Academy perform in 2015

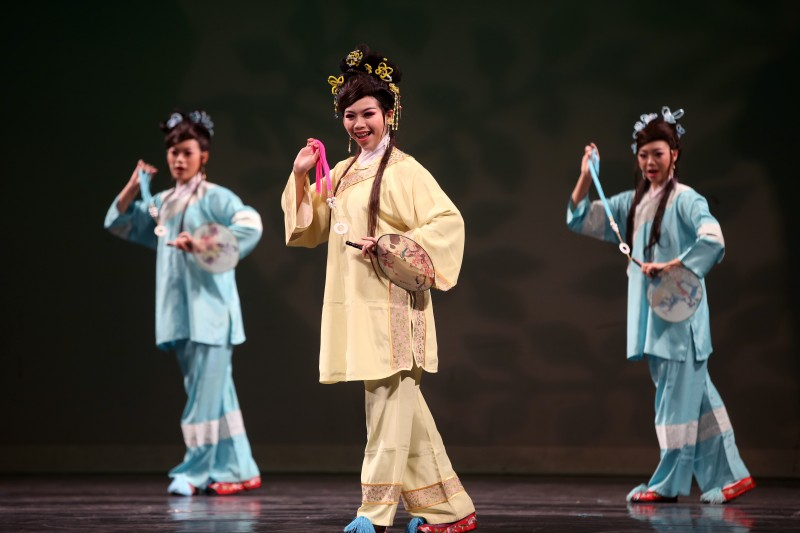
Taiwanese opera students from the National Taiwan College of Performing Arts perform in 2014

Professional schools for Chinese opera, known as keban (Chinese: 科班; pinyin: kēbān; Wade–Giles: k'o-pan; Jyutping: fo baan), existed in China from the Ming dynasty (1368–1644) to the 20th century. Formerly attached to performing troupes, many keban became independent boarding schools by the late 19th century.

Today, a few degree-granting, western-style educational institutions specialize in Chinese opera, like the National Academy of Chinese Theatre Arts in Beijing and the National Taiwan College of Performing Arts in Taipei.

== Education ==
In learning Peking opera, attending students developed skills in martial arts, acrobatics and tumbling, music and dance and performed these skills for audiences. The schools produced a generation of stunt performers, action choreographers, actors and film directors including some of the most famous stars of Hong Kong action cinema. Public interest in Peking Opera waned in the late 1960s and during the Cultural Revolution most of the schools were closed.

Historically, pupils had been handpicked at a young age by a teacher (or sifu) and trained for a period of seven to ten years, on contract from their parents. As the teacher provided food and accommodation for the pupils during this period, they accrued a debt to the teacher that was later repaid through performance earnings. After 1911, training took place in more formally organised schools. Typically, students at these schools rose at five o'clock in the morning for exercises. The daytime would be spent learning the skills of acting and combat, and the senior students would perform in outside theatres in the evenings. Corporal punishment was commonplace and it was not uncommon for the entire group to be beaten with bamboo canes if one student made a mistake during a performance. Schools with less harsh training methods began to appear in 1930, but all schools were closed down in 1931 after the Japanese invasion. The modern schools, such as the China Drama Academy and the Spring and Autumn Drama School opened after the war, in around 1952.

== Notable schools ==
The China Drama Academy was a Peking opera school in Hong Kong, run by Yu Jim-yuen. Attendees included Jackie Chan, Sammo Hung, Yuen Biao, Yuen Wah, Yuen Qiu and Corey Yuen.

The Spring and Autumn Drama School was another Peking opera school in Hong Kong, and was to some extent the China Drama Academy's "rival". It was run by Madame Fan Fok-Fa, who had been China's first female martial arts actress. The school also produced a number of stunt performers and actors, most notably Lam Ching Ying, Josephine Siao and Hsiao Hou of Shaw Brothers fame. Mars went on to become a member of the Jackie Chan Stunt Team (Sing Ga Ban) and several others became members of Hung Ga Ban, Sammo Hung's stunt team. Other notable students included Chin Kar-lok, Chung Fat, John Lone, and Connie Chan Po-chu.

A similar school in Taipei, Taiwan was attended by another group of people who subsequently worked in the Hong Kong film industry. It was known as the Fu Sheng (Fu Xing Ju Xiao) or Lu Kwan Peking Opera school. Although still called a Peking Opera school, students actually learned Taiwanese opera, sung in Hokkien dialect rather than Mandarin.
