= Maggie Cheung Ho-yee =

Hong Kong actress (born 1969)

- 張可頤
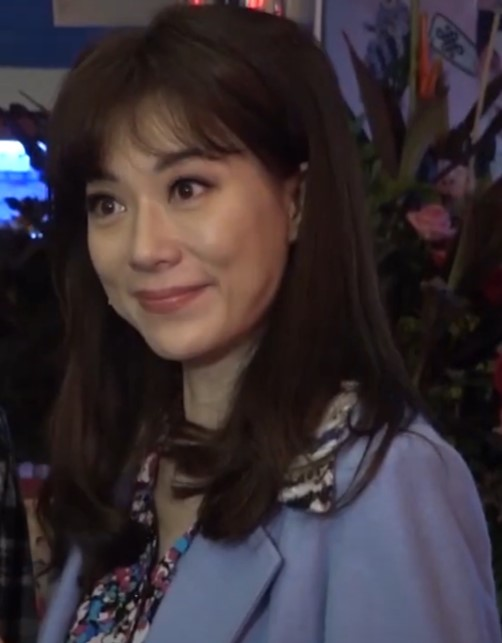
- Cheung in 2019
- Born: 20 March 1969 (age 57); British Hong Kong
- Education: St. Mary's Canossian College
- Occupation: Actress
- Years active: 1989–present
- Awards: TVB Anniversary Awards – Best Actress; 2003 The King of Yesterday & Tomorrow; My Favourite Television Character; 2001 The Awakening Story; 2003 The King of Yesterday & Tomorrow; All-Time Most Memorable Female Leading Roles; 1999 Old Time Buddy

Chinese name
- Traditional Chinese: 張可頤
- Simplified Chinese: 张可颐
Transcriptions
Standard Mandarin
- Hanyu Pinyin: Zhāng Kěyí
Yue: Cantonese
- Jyutping: Zoeng1 Ho2ji4

Maggie Cheung Ho-yee (Chinese: 張可頤; Jyutping: zoeng1 ho2 ji4; born 20 March 1969) is a Hong Kong actress.

== Career ==
Cheung was a member of four-piece girl band "PP Gals" in 1991. Her name was "Tina" in the band. They released an album called "PP Gals. DJ Boy" and disbanded in 1991.

She competed in TVB's 1994 Miss Hong Kong beauty pageant, reaching the final five but not placing. However she did gain a special award for best "potential artist" (最具演藝潛質獎) and was signed to the channel soon afterwards.

Her career spun off to a whirlwind of a start, as she was offered a leading role. However, she wanted to start from the bottom up and hence declined the role, only to accept a subsidiary role in another series. Many will say that her career kicked off with the well accepted Old Time Buddy, but some others say it is with her primary leading role in "One Good Turn Deserves Another".

The popularity of artists in the Hong Kong television market depends as much on the popularity of the characters in a series as to the ability of the actors and it was not until 1998 that she achieved mainstream popularity with the series "Old Time Buddy", in which she played a character based on 60s teen idol Connie Chan Po-chu. The character was well received because of Maggie's excellent portrayal of Connie Chan. The immense success lead to sequel, To Catch A Thief, a movie, Those Were The Days, and even a platinum selling CD.

She has co-starred with numerous male actors, such as Gallen Lo, Louis Koo, Wong He, Roger Kwok, Steven Ma, Joe Ma, Moses Chan, Gordon Lam, and numerous others. Her chemistry with Gallen Lo lead to several other pairings in other series. Gordon Lam worked with Maggie Cheung in Plain Love II, which built a strong friendship amongst the two.

In 2003, she won the most coveted award a TVB actress can receive, Favorite Lead Actress, beating other "fa dan", a Cantonese term borrowed from Cantonese operas and roughly corresponding to modern notions of main actresses, such as Jessica Hsuan, Flora Chan, and Kenix Kwok. In 2004, she was in the race for the award again with new series that included "The Conqueror's Story" and "War and Beauty". However, the filming for the Jackie Chan/Stanley Kwan's project "To Live to Love" (Chang Hen Ge), interfered with the award ceremony, and Gigi Lai won the award.

In 2005, she was diagnosed with the rare Graves' Disease, preventing her from filming "Au Revoir Shanghai" and she was replaced by Anne Heung. After a break from showbiz for 2 years, she has just recovered and Maggie has said in an interview that she would be filming a new drama series in August 2007. Her numerous fans worldwide are avidly awaiting the release of a new drama from Cheung. She also hosted the Mr Hong Kong 2007 contest with Dodo Cheng.

In 2010, Cheung became a spokesperson for the French's anti-aging skincare brand, RoC.

== Filmography ==
=== TV series ===
Year	Title	Role	Notes
1995	The Condor Heroes 95	Ching Ying	
1995	The Unexpected	Au Yeung Sau Lan (Cindy)	
1995	A Kindred Spirit	Miss Yuen (Fanny)	
1996	Cold Blood Warm Heart	Yip Hiu Bing (Chris)	
1996	Ancient Heroes	Jiu Yun San	
1996	Once Upon a Time in Shanghai	Gu Ching Wah	
1996	One Good Turn Deserves Another	Au Hok Yi (Queenie)	
1997	A Road and a Will	Chai Ho Fung	
1997	Old Time Buddy	Ching Bo Chu	TVB Award for Most Memorable Female Leading Role; Nominated - TVB Award for Best Actress
1997	Mystery Files	Man Ka Lei (Carrie)	
1997	A Recipe for the Heart	Ha Jun Jun	
1998	Old Time Buddy: To Catch a Thief	Ching Bo Chu	
1999	Plain Love II	Pun Mui Nga	Nominated - TVB Award for Best Actress (Top 5)
1999	A Smiling Ghost Story	Lam Ka Yi / Lee Wing Yan	
2000	The Sky is the Limit	Gam Lan	
2001	The Awakening Story	Suen Hing Ga (Rose)	TVB Award for My Favourite Television Character
2002	Burning Flame II	Chung Yan Yee (Chris)	
2002	Let's Face It	Ko Ka Lei	
2002	Police Station No.7	Tsang Bo Yin	
2003	Ups and Downs in the Sea of Love	Fong Nga Man (Yama)	
2003	The King of Yesterday and Tomorrow	Liu Sei Leung	TVB Award for Best Actress; TVB Award for My Favourite Television Character; Nominated - Astro Wah Lai Toi Drama Award for Best Actress (Top 5)
2003	Better Halves	Lin Bak Hap	
2004	War and Beauty	On Sin	Nominated - TVB Award for My Favourite Television Character; Astro Wah Lai Toi Drama Award for My Favourite Television Character; Nominated - Astro Wah Lai Toi Drama Award for Best Actress (Top 5)
2004	The Conqueror's Story	Empress Lü Zhi	Nominated - Astro Wah Lai Toi Drama Award for Best Actress (Top 5)
2006	To Live to Love	Wang Qiyao	
2010	My Better Half	Ko Lai Sum	
2010	Beauty Knows No Pain	Sha Yuen-kei (Jackie)	Nominated - TVB Award for Best Actress (Top 5); Nominated - Astro Wah Lai Toi Drama Award for Best Actress (Top 5); Nominated - Astro Wah Lai Toi Drama Award for My Favourite Television Character
2011	Forensic Heroes III	Dr. Mandy Chung Hok-sum	Nominated — TVB Anniversary Award for Best Actress (Top 5); Nominated — TVB Anniversary Award for My Favourite Female Character (Top 5); Nominated - Astro My AOD Drama Award for Best Actress (Top 5); Nominated - Astro My AOD Drama Award for My Favourite Television Character
2012	The Last Steep Ascent	Ku Sun-yuet	Nominated - Astro My AOD Drama Award for Best Actress; Nominated - Astro My AOD Drama Award for My Favourite Television Character
2013	Legend of Lu Zhen	Lou Qingxiang	
2014	Sound of the Desert	Empress Wei Zifu	
2014	To Be or Not to Be	Anson Leung	
2020	Single Papa	Sharon	Main Role

=== Films ===
Year	Title	Role	Notes
1989	A Better Tomorrow III	Ling	aka A Better Tomorrow 3: Love and Death in Saigon
1990	Spy Games	Ken's girlfriend	
1995	Highway Man		
1996	Twinkle Twinkle Lucky Star		
1997	Those Were the Days	Ching Bo Chu	
1999	Gorgeous		cameo
2000	Troublesome Night 8	Woman at Mrs. Bud's temple	
2000	When a Man Loves a Woman	Fung	
2001	Troublesome Night 9	Ms. Liu	
2001	Headlines	Joey	
2001	Thou Shall Not Commit	Maggie Yeung	
2002	Reunion	Yan	
2010	Crossing Hennessy		
2011	I Love Hong Kong	Gau Gu Leung	
2011	Men Suddenly in Love	Lau Yuk-hing	
2011	Punished	Mrs. Wong	
2011	The Fortune Buddies	Maggie	
2017	All My Goddess		
2018	The Trough		
2022	Where the Wind Blows		
2024	Rob N Roll	Ginger	
