= The Flying Fox =

1964 Hong Kong film by Siu Sang

Legend of the Fox
- 萬變飛狐
- Directed by: Siu Sang; Choi Cheung
- Written by: Siu Sang; Choi Cheung
- Starring: Yu So-chow; Cheung Ying-choi; Connie Chan
- Cinematography: Gui Wen
- Production company: Gam Wing
- Release date: 18 March 1964
- Running time: 109 minutes
- Country: Hong Kong
- Language: Cantonese

The Flying Fox (萬變飛狐), also known as The Purple Lightning Sword, is a 1964 Hong Kong wuxia film produced by Gam Wing and directed by Siu Sang.

== Synopsis ==
Wan Liyun, the leader of a martial arts sect, investigates the murder of his uncle Wan Jianfeng, who has been killed by a masked attacker using the Emei Sect's skills. During this time, Wan Liyun meets Di Xiaoqing, a Mongol princess in disguise as a man. After further investigation, he concludes that Yinyang Guaisou, who works for Di Xiaoqing's father Prince Beidi, is the real murderer attempting to push the blame to the Emei Sect. Di Xiaoqing secretly helps Wan Liyun evade danger and ultimately kill Yinyang Guaisou to avenge his uncle.

== Cast ==
- Yu So-chow as Di Xiaoqing
- Cheung Ying-choi as Wan Liyun
- Connie Chan as Dongfang Ming
- Shih Kien as Yinyang Guaisou
- Lee Pang-fei as Prince Beidi
