= Helen Li =

Chinese actress, screenwriter and film director

- Chinese: 李湄
- Born: Li Jingfang; 1929; Jilin province, China
- Died: 1994 (aged 64–65); United States
- Other names: Lee Mei, Lee Ging-Fong, Li Mei, Li Meifang, Li Qian, Helen Li Mei, Helen Mei Li
- Occupations: Actress; screenwriter; film director
- Years active: 1950–1966

Helen Li (Chinese: 李湄) (1929–1994) was a Chinese actress, screenwriter, and film director from Hong Kong. Li is credited with over 50 films.

== Biography ==
On September 1, 1929, Li was born as Li Jingfang in Jilin province, China. Li spent her childhood in Hebei, China.

Li studied political science at University of North China in Beijing, China.

In 1950, Li became a screenwriter as Li Qian for Minsheng Film Company in Hong Kong. In 1952, Li participated in Miss Hong Kong Beauty pageant as Li Mei. Li's first film as a screenwriter was The Golden World (1953). Li appeared as Ah Lien in Strayed Beauty, a 1954 drama film directed by Chiu Shu-San. In 1956, Li founded Beidou Film Company. In 1961, Li appeared in the play Hong Kong in Japan. Li is also known for her role as Tao Hai-Yin in It's Always Spring, a 1962 Musical Romance Comedy film directed by Evan Yang. In the film, Li's singing was dubbed by Winnie Wei Xiuxian, however, she sang in the soundtracks. Li became a model for Jantzen swimsuit. Li is credited with over 50 films.

In 1949, Li moved to Hong Kong. In 1967, Li married an American. Li and her family lived in the United States. On December 5, 1994, Li died from cancer in the United States.

== Filmography ==
=== Films ===
This is a partial list of films.

- 1953 The Golden World
- 1953 Notorious Woman - Su Lee
- 1954 Strayed Beauty - Ah Lien
- 1957 Wild Fire - also as Director, producer
- 1959 For Better, for Worse - Meijuan
- 1959 Calendar Girl
- 1962 It's Always Spring - Tao Hai-Yin
- 1966 The International Secret Agents (aka International Secret Agent, SOS Hong Kong)
