= Mystery Files (Hong Kong TV series) =

Hong Kong television series

- Official poster
- 迷離檔案
- Genre: Science fiction Suspense
- Screenplay by: Alex Pau; Choi Yuk-ying; Tang Kin-sing; Ma Ka-wai; Tang Chi-san
- Directed by: Chu Yik-lung; Yuen Wai-yee; Mak Koon-chi; Joe Chan; Lee Shu-fan
- Starring: Gallen Lo; Maggie Cheung; Nick Cheung; Marco Ngai; Emily Kwan; Simon Lo
- Theme music composer: Sheryl Crow
- Opening theme: There is Something (有事) by Josie Ho
- Ending theme: Embracing Snow (抱雪) by Jacky Cheung
- Composer: Keith Chan
- Country of origin: Hong Kong
- Original language: Cantonese
- No. of episodes: 20

Production
- Producer: Yip Sing-hong
- Production location: Hong Kong
- Camera setup: Multi camera
- Production company: TVB

Original release
- Network: TVB Jade
- Release: 12 May – 6 June 1997

Mystery Files
- Traditional Chinese: 迷離檔案
- Simplified Chinese: 迷离档案
- Literal meaning: "Blurred Files"
Transcriptions
Standard Mandarin
- Hanyu Pinyin: Mí Lí Dǎng Àn
Yue: Cantonese
- Jyutping: Mai4 Lei4 Dong2 Ngon3

Mystery Files is a 1997 Hong Kong science fiction thriller television series produced by TVB and stars Gallen Lo as a biochemist who advocates scientific methods to refute superstitious theories, utilizing scientific theories to uncover the answers to a series of strange events.

== Plot ==
Peter Ko (Gallen Lo) is a university biochemistry professor who is calm and believes in science while opposes superstition. Carrie Man (Maggie Cheung) is a researcher and screenwriter for documentary programmes at a television station who has witnessed a series of strange events. By chance, the two have the opportunity to cooperate to discover the truth of a series of strange cases. Due to their different views, conflict and misunderstands arises from time to time during their cooperation. Eventually, they develop mutual understanding for one another and a relationship also blossoms. One time, during an attempt to save Peter, Carrie was stabbed to death. In order to resurrect Carrie back to life, Peter must venture into the fourth dimension.

== Cast ==
=== The Ko and Siu family ===
- Wilson Tsui as Ko Chi-wing (高志榮), Peter's father who is psychic and travels through time to the present.
- Wong Fung-king as Ko Mok Wai-fong (高莫惠芳), Peter's mother who died at an early age.
- Alice Fung So-bor as Siu Wai San-san (邵衛姍姍), Siu Cheuk-nam's mother who is also Peter's adoptive mother.
- Gallen Lo as Peter Ko (高永賢), the main protagonist of the series, a university biochemistry professor who only believes in scientific theories and disregards superstition.
- Nick Cheung as Siu Cheuk-nam (邵卓男), Siu Wai San-san's son and Peter's adoptive younger brother who is a police inspector.

=== The Man family ===
- Lam Sheung Yee as Man Pak-kin (文栢堅), Carrie's father.
- Kitty Lau as Man Chan Siu-kuen (文陳少娟), Carrie's mother.
- Law Lan as Man Choi-tip (文彩蝶), Pak-kin's eldest sister and Carrie's aunt.
- Maggie Cheung Ho-yee as Carrie Man (文嘉利), a researcher and screenwriter for documentary programmes at a television station who collaborates with Peter to solve a series a strange cases and Peter's girlfriend.
- Simon Lo as Man Ka-ho (文嘉浩), Carrie's younger brother who is a student of Peter.

=== University ===
- Tai Siu-man as Frankie, Peter's homosexual friend who is a professor.
- Emily Kwan as Pauline Leung (梁愛晶), Peter's assistant who develops a relationship with Cheuk-nam, become Siu Cheuk-nam's girlfriend.
- Isaac Ng as Ka-ho's classmate.
- Eric Li as Ka-ho's classmate.
- Cheung Hak as Ka-ho's classmate.

=== Television station ===
- Marco Ngai as Benny Ngai (魏國鋒), Carrie's superior and ex-boyfriend who is a good friend of Peter.
- Sher Ng as Lee Chau-ping (李秋萍), Carrie's colleague.
- Lo Cheuk-nam as director.
- Wong Kin-fung as a program host.
- Bruce Li as Householder Lee (李居士).
- Leung Kin-ping as a program host.
- Ho Mei-ho as a program host.
- Chan Cho-kiu as a program host.
- Yau Piu as Carrie's colleague.
- Tong Chun-ming as Carrie's colleague.
- Suen Yan-ming as Carrie's colleague.
- Law Suet-ling as Carrie's colleague.
- Wong Man-piu as Kelvin, a security guard.
- Ling Lai-man as the chief producer.

=== Police force ===
- Cheung Hon-pan as a CID officer.
- Luk Hei-yeung as a CID officer.
- Deno Cheung as a CID officer.
- Esther Wan as a CID officer.
- Lau Wing-chun as a CID officer.
- Lui Wing-yee as a CID officer.
- Cheung Chun-wah as a CID officer.

=== Other cast ===
- Shek Wan as a security guard.
- Law Kwan-ho as Hon (阿漢).
- Ben Wong Tin-tok as Ray, Pauline's older cousin who is a doctor.
- Siu Yuk-yin as Lily
- Akina Hong as Helen, Benny's ex-girlfriend.
- Lung Chi-sing as Law Kau (羅球), a scamming fortune teller.
- Chan Min-leung as Fat (阿發).

== Themes and Cases ==
=== The Statue (神像; Episodes 1-3) ===
==== Plot ====
Peter meets up with his mentor, Law Wang-chi (Wong Wai) and reminiscent the past. Law's daughter, Pui-ling (Winnie Yeung), recently returned to Hong Kong gives a statue to her father as a gift. One day, their housemaid, Sister Heung (Lily Liu), develops hallucinations and was sent to the hospital for treatment. Chau-ping and Carrie interviews Sister Heung about her experience, while Peter also appears in the television program to give an explanation from a scientific point of view. As a result, Peter and Carrie opposes each other. One day, Carrie buys necklace in the streets from Nip Hung (Samuel Yau). However, Carrie's aunt, Choi-tip, claims the god idol on the necklace is related to a murder case. Later, Law's wife, Wai-chun (Ceci So), also develops hallucinations and kills herself from jumping off a building. Carrie interviews Law about the incident, but Law suddenly acts like a demon and dies from a heart attack. Carrie's father, Pak-kin, researches about the statue and Carrie discovers the statue being cursed. Peter retrieves the statue from Pui-ling for research and he sees the spirit of his deceased mother while driving, leading to a car crash which fortunately only left Peter with minor injuries. Later, Carrie obtains her driver's license and was scammed while purchasing an antique car. When Pui-ling decides to return to Los Angeles, she gives the statue to Peter, who analyzes it with his friends and discovers many channels in it. One time when Peter drives Carrie home, he sees Law Kau, who once scammed him. Peter then reveals to Carrie that in the past, Kau gave a taoist charm to his mother to treat her illness, but his mother died from her illness, leading him to hate superstition. Later, Hung steals the statue and fights with his sister, Ling (Lee Kwi-ying). Hung gives the statue to Carrie, who develops hallucinations and was nearly run over by a truck but was saved by Peter. When Ling attempts to pick up the statue from the road, she was electrocuted to death. Eventually the statue was brought back to the tomb, but Peter suspects the statue causes subconscious fear.

==== Cast ====
- Wong Wai as Law Wang-chi (羅宏志), Peter's mentor.
- Ceci So as Law Lee Wai-chun (羅李慧珍), Law's wife.
- Winnie Yeung as Law Pui-ling (羅珮玲), Law's daughter.
- Cheng Ka-sang as Wong Tai-yung (王大勇), a grave-robber who stole the statue in 1976, which gave him hallucinations and became a serial killer.
- Lily Liu as Sister Heung (香姐), Law's housemaid who develops hallucinations from the statues and sees killings by the Japanese army.
- Yau Man-sing as Nip Hung (聶雄), Wong Ta-yung's descendant.
- Lee Kai-ying as Nip Ling (聶羚), Wong Ta-yung's descendant.

=== The Guardian Angel (守護天使; Episodes 3-4) ===
==== Plot ====
Fong Chi-yan (May Kwong) is a new colleague at the television station. One time while buying midnight snacks, Chi-yan ran into two punks, Wong Yik-sing (Yu Lok-fai) and Chan Sai-wing (Law Cho-ho). When her grandfather, Fong Kwai-kit (Cheung Ying-choi), attempts to save her, he was attack and got into a coma. When Carrie brings Benny home, she loses her antique watch. Benny, feeling guilty, then begs Peter for his collector's watch, and Benny starts to pursue Carrie. Later, Yik-sing and Sai-wing wants revenge and rapes Chi-yan. Chi-yan becomes traumatised and temporarily moves in with Carrie, who discovers Chi-yan's sleepwalking habits. Yik-sing and Sai-wing were then murdered and Chi-yan's boyfriend, Lai Ka-leung (Ruco Chan) becomes the primary suspect. Ka-leung then breaks up with Chi-yan and takes her necklace, leaving her heartbroken. Kwai-kit then appears in Ka-leung's house and kills him, terrifying Ka-leung's new girlfriend Winnie (Wong Hoi-sze). Peter later discovers Chi-Yan s grandfather clothes stained with powder present in Ka-leung's home, but Victor (Ram Chiang) claims The grandfather was not at the scene. Cheuk-nam investigates Chi-yan's home and fins the necklace that Ka-leung took back present. Later, Peter's assistant, Pauline gives him a pen as a gift, which Peter then gives it to Chi-yan, who mistakenly believes that Peter has feelings for her. One time while visiting her grandfather, Chi-yan falls asleep at the hospital room, but wakes her finding her grandfather gone. She then sees her grandfather strangling Peter at the parking lot and she faints, waking up at the hospital room, discovering that her grandfather has died. Peter does not believe Kwai-kit was culprit of the attack.

==== Cast ====
- May Kwong as Fong Chi-yan (方紫欣), Carrie's new colleague who had a crush on Peter at one point.
- Cheung Ying-choi as Fong Kwai-kit (方貴傑), Chi-yan's grandfather whose spirit was the culprit behind the murders.
- Chu Lok-fai as Wong Yik-sing (王德成), a punk who attacked Kwai-kit and raped Chi-yan before being murdered by the former.
- Law Cho-ho as Chan Sai-wing (陳世榮), a punk who attacked Kwai-kit and raped Chi-yan before being murdered by the former.
- Ruco Chan as Lai Ka-leung (賴家亮), Chi-yan's ex-boyfriend who was killed by Kwai-kit.
- Wong Hoi-sze as Winnie, Ka-leung's new girlfriend who gone mad after witnessing Kwai-kit kill her boyfriend.

=== The Genius Idiot (天才白痴, Episodes 4-6) ===
==== Plot ====
Benny and his ex-girlfriend Helen gets back together behind Carrie's back. Victor was later involved in a car accident, which lead him to see flashing footage in his brain where a jewelry shop employee being killed and Cheuk-nam being shot. A real robbery occurs where Cheuk-nam was unharmed but the robbers, Chan Po (Pal Sinn) and Fung (Celine Ma) escapes. Po also kills undercover officer Sing (Lam Kim-fung). When Victor was playing tennis with Peter, he sees Sing being buried and asks Peter and Carrie to accompany him to find Sing's corpse. Benny goes to vacation with helen in Cheung Chau and lies that he is playing golf with Peter in Shenzhen. Carrie finds out and breaks up with Benny. Victor's personality changes and his mother, Fong (Lily Li), goes to Peter for help as she suspects that his son is possessed by his older twin brother. Peter suspects Victor's twin brother is still alive and Carrie makes a call to Dongguan to confirm the matter. Victor feels Po's position and they meet up, revealing them to be brothers. Po also meets with Fong. Later, Po commits a crime and injures his arm before being murdered, which was witnessed by Victor. One day, Victor and Fong goes to worship Po in the cemetery and Victor seems to be possessed by Po. Victor goes to a nightclub and kills Po's underling, Kwai (Lee Ka-keung), and afterwards, goes to the villa to attack Fung. fung manages to escape and was brought to the hospital. Carrie believes Victor will kill Fung at the hospital and she rushes there with Peter, but they find Fung killed once they arrived. Victor also holds Carrie hostage and Peter attempts to persuade Victor, but Victor goes mad and Carrie manages to escape from him. Victor was then arrested and doctors believed Victor had developed schizophrenia.

===== Cast =====
- Ram Chiang as Victor Lee (李子建), a doctor who suffers from schizophrenia.
- Lily Li as Fong (阿芳), Chan Po and Victor's mother.
- Lee Wong-sang as Officer Wong (王Sir), Sing's superior.
- Pal Sinn as Chan Po (陳波), born Lee Chi-chiu (李子超), Victor's older twin brother.
- Celine Ma as Fung (阿鳳), Chan Po's girlfriend who eventually betrays and murders him before being murdered by Victor.
- Lam Kim-fung as Sing (阿星), an undercover police officer who was killed by Po after his cover was blown.
- Lee Ka-keung as Kwai (阿桂), Po's underling who schemes with Fung to murder Po before being murdered by Victor.

=== Reincarnation (輪迴; Episodes 7-9) ===
==== Plot ====
During Pak-kin's birthday, Choi-tip and Siu-kuen were pleasing each other, much to the annoyance to Pak-kin, who leaves with Peter. Peter later sees an advertisement of a girl named Fung Suk-yan (Kan Pui-kwan) searching for Cheung Wai (Hawick Lau), although the two of them have died 20 years old in a traffic accident. Pak-kin puts up an ad to meet Suk-yan. Cheuk-nam pursues Man-man (Natalie Wong), but Pauline badmouths him in front of Man-man. Cheuk-nam deeply hates Pauline as a result. One day, Peter and Carrie bump into Cheng Nga-yee (Josie Ho), a girl who claims to be the reincarnation of Suk-yee. Peter find it ridiculous. Yeung Kai-cheung (Joseph Lee), Chi-yan's ex-boyfriend, meets Nga-yee at Queen's Cafe and calls her Chi-yan and invites her home for a temporary stay. Nga-yee's boyfriend, joe (Lau Wing-kin) comes to Hong Kong, but Nga-yee refuses to follow him. Carrie brings Nga-yee to her home. Nga-yee believes Ka-ho to be Wai. When Nga-yee is upset, Ka-ho comforts her and they act intimately together, which upsets Kai-cheung. Benny becomes lovelorn again and Carrie feels sympathetic and cares for him. When Benny sends flowers to Carrie, she mistakenly thought it was from Peter. When Ka-ho and Nga-yee were about to leave for vacation, they encounter Joe and get into conflict. Ka-ho drives away with Nga-yee and they encounter an accident. Ka-ho wakes up believing he is Wai. One time, Ka-ho leaves some medication at Kai-cheung's home and Carrie goes to retrieve it and witnesses Kai-cheung being intimate with Nga-yee. Ka-ho suddenly faints and suspects Kai-cheung. Cheuk-nam arrests Joe before realizing Joe was framed by Kai-cheung. Cheuk-nam searches Kai-cheung's home and car shop and discovers Wai and Suk-yan's car and deprogram of Peter's car, planning to use it to kill Ka-ho and Nga-yee. However, Carrie unexpectedly drives Peter's car and sees items that she needs and feels heart-warmed. Carrie crashes the car and Peter desperately saves her. Kai-cheung later takes Nga-yee with him and encounter a traffic accident. Kai-cheung dies and Nga-yee regains sanity and leaves with Joe.

==== Cast ====
- Josie Ho as Cheng Nga-yee (鄭雅兒), Fung Suk-yan's younger sister who suffers from schizophrenia and believes herself to be her sister.
- Lau Wing-kin as Joe, Nga-yee's boyfriend
- Joseph Lee as Yeung Kai-cheung (楊繼昌), Fung Suk-yan's ex-boyfriend who murdered her and Cheung Wai and attempted to murder Nga-yee and Ka-ho.
- Kan Pui-kwan as Fung Suk-yan (馮淑恩), Wai's girlfriend who died in a car accident orchestrated by Kai-cheung.
- Hawick Lau as Cheung Wai (張偉), Suk-yan's boyfriend who died in a car accident orchestrated by Kai-cheung.
- Kwok Tak-sun as a therapist who diagnoses Nga-yee.

=== Tame Head (降頭; Episodes 10-12) ===
==== Plot ====
Cheuk-nam's colleague, Dennis (Wong Wai-leung), is getting married and Cheuk-nam sees Pauline at the bridal salon and ridicules her. On the day of the wedding, Dennis receives a mysterious box and dies as his brain tissues erodes, leaving his wife, Ling (Chung Kit-yee), heartbroken. When Ling's uncle, Ming (Jerry Ku) suspects Ling have been affected by the tame head spell, he also dies suddenly and his corpse rots. When Cheuk-nam investigates the case, Ling disappears leaving fragmented flowers present in her house. Peter's colleague, Frankie, discovers these flower are used for putting tame head spells. At this time, Man-man becomes lovelorn and Cheuk-nam comforts her. Cheuk-nam goes to a gay bar to investigate a case of a woman who died from having her bled dry. He then sees Ling leaving with a girl and sucking her blood. When Cheuk-nam arrest Ling, Ling claims she sucks blood to reduce pain. Cheuk-nam receives a threat letter to release Ling. One day, Man-man meets with Cheuk-nam and makes congee for him, who spits out cocoons after consuming it. Carrie brings Cheuk-nam to Choi-tip, who discovers Cheuk-nam being affected by tame head spell. Peter refuses to believe this and finds fungus growing in Man-man's kitchen. Cheuk-nam later receives a fax forcing him to release Ling. He eventually discovers Man-man to be the person who sent him the fax. Man-man is Ling's lover who uses kills with tame head spells to get Ling back. At 12:00AM, Ling dies while screaming and Man-man escapes. Pauline's cousin, Ray, examines Cheuk-nam's body and discovers hook worms inside that can not be cured for the moment. Peter then receives a fax from bacteria professor Jack that a certain type of leaves can kill these worms. Rejoiced, Peter proceeds to do research, but Frankie informs him that Jack has died two weeks ago. Peter finds Man-man, whose body had begun to rot, and states to her that she is using bacteria and not tame head to kill. Man-man then goes mad and sets a fire where she dies from while Peter manages to escape in time. Frankie later finds out that Man-man was Jack's student who suffers from mental disorders. When Peter sees the hook worms fighting with each other, he comes up with a solution to save Cheuk-nam. However, Cheuk-nam goes missing. Pauline eventually finds Cheuk-nam and desperately saves him. After being rescued, Cheuk-nam develops feelings for Pauline.

==== Cast ====
- Natalie Wong as Man-man (雯雯), born Ching Siu-hung (程小紅), Ling's lesbian lover who uses science to put fake tame head spells.
- Wong Wai-leung as Dennis, Cheuk-nam's colleague who was killed by Man-man.
- Chung Kit-yee as Ling (阿玲), Dennis' wife from Malaysia and Man-man lesbian lover who goes on a murder spree after believing she was affected by a tame head spell.
- Jerry Ku as Uncle Ming (明叔), Ling's uncle who was killed by Man-man.

=== Cult (邪教; Episodes 12-14) ===
==== Plot ====
Cheuk-nam's ex-girlfriend, Rosa (Chan Heung-ying) and another child girl was killed after their hearts were taken out. Rosa's boyfriend and the little girl's mother both happen to belong in an "apostolic" church. When Cheuk-nam investigates the church, he sees its members acting mad. Chi (Damon Law), son of Pak-king's friend, Piu (Chan Chung-kin), joins the church and refuses to come home afterwards. Peter and Carrie bring a camera team to intervene its priest, Chan Lap-man (Cheng Pak-lun). Chan then tells Chi to go home. However, Chi was executed at midnight with his heart taken out. Cheuk-nam searches the churches and finds a pile of hearts, which turn out to be pig's hearts. At this time, Benny loses his job and Helen leaves him, leaving him depressed. At a disco, Karen (Eileen Yeow) flirts with Benny and brings him to the church, where Benny vows to sacrifice his soul for his wishes to come true. Afterwards, Benny was reinstated in his job and received a raise, while Helen goes into a coma after a car accident, leaving Benny Shocked. Benny later meets a girl named Fong at a bar and makes out with her, but the next day, he finds her dead with her heart taken out. Peter starts to worry when he sees Benny hanging with Karen, and he brings Benny to see Pastor Tung (Tam Hing-chuen). Benny feels uncomfortable seeing Tung and angrily leaves. Cheuk-nam investigates the case and a bartender informs him that Benny left with Fong the other night but refuses to admit so. Benny later makes out with another girl named Jayce in a love hotel and wakes up her heart taken out as well. Cheuk-nam later finds Benny's wallet during investigation. Benny was afraid to go home and later sees Karen poisoning a man's drink at a bar. Benny then follows her and sees Karen and Chan taking out the heart of a woman who had a sexual relationship with the man at the bar. Benny immediately calls Peter to the church. Peter and Carrie rushes to the church, where a doomsday festival was being held. The church members were led to a secret chamber where they were intoxicated by the holy water. Fortunately, Peter was able to prevent Benny and Carrie from drinking it, and Cheuk-nam eventually brings his squad to the rescue.

==== Cast ====
- Cheng Pak-lun as Chan Lap-man (陳立文), a cult leader and serial killer who takes out the hearts of his victims.
- Eileen Yeow as Karen, Chan's assistant and accomplice.
- Chan Heung-ying as Rosa, Cheuk-nam's ex-girlfriend who had her heart taken out by Chan.
- Ngai Wai-man as Officer Ma (馬Sir), a coroner.
- Chan Chung-kin as Uncle Piu (標叔), Pak-kin's old friend.
- Leo Tsang as Mr. Chan (陳先生), the father of the murdered child girl.
- Damon Law as Chi (智仔), Uncle Piu's son and a member of the apostolic church who had his heart taken out by Chan.
- Tam Hing-chuen as Pastor Tung (董牧師), a good friend of Pak-kin.
- Wong Kai-tak as a member of the apostolic church.

=== Mutation (異變; Episodes 15-17) ===
==== Plot ====
Peter's ex-girlfriend, Vicky (Claudia Lau), returns to Hong Kong who is upset when she finds out he is dating Carrie. Although Vicky still has feelings for Peter, she pretends to be generous. After Vicky's mother died, her longtime pen pal Uncle Chan introduces her to Hong Kong to work at Chu's Corporation. Its boss, Chu Chak-sing (Wong San) seems to have special feelings for Vicky. One day, her colleague, Leung Kin-hoi (Tam Yat-ching) asks her to visit Chak-sing at the hospital, where Chak-sing reveals himself to be Vicky's father and asks for her forgiveness. Chak-sing also tells her he is the Uncle Chan that have been writing to her. Chak-sing's three children, Yiu-chung (Mak Ka-lun), Yiu-cho (Au Siu-wai) and Yee-ting (Lam Pui-kwan), and their mother, Ting Yung (Mannor Chan), views Vicky as their enemy. When Chak-sing dies, he gives a majority of the stocks of Chu's Corporation to Vicky and Kin-hoi assists her in managing the company. Chak-sing's three children hires assassins to kill Vicky. Vicky was shot multiple times and fell into a forest. However, a few days later, Vicky returns to work at Chu's Corporation as if nothing happened, much to the surprise of the three. Later, Vicky sees the assassin (Siu Cheuk-yiu) and follows him, knows her siblings plan to kill her. Vicky then kills Yiu-cho and Yee-ting. Later, Pauline becomes pregnant and Cheuk-nam wants to get married with her, although she is hesitant. Vicky gradually grows pale despite feeling absolutely no pain. Cheuk-nam is assigned to provide close protection for Yiu-chung. However, when Yiu-chung was fooling with his mistress Lily, Vicky takes the chance and attempts to kill him, where Yiu-chung flees to the rooftop. Cheuk-nam gives chase but was knocked unconscious and Vicky pushes Yiu-chung off the building. Cheuk-nam suffers from brain hemorrhage and goes into a coma. At this time, Vicky professes her love to Peter, who rejects her, and she starts to have twisted thoughts of bringing Peter away. While Vicky was working at night, Yung appears and attempts to kill her. They fight but Vicky manages to escape and Yung reveals herself to be the killer of Chak-sing. The police later finds a carrion with a picture of Peter in it. When Cheuk-nam wakes from his coma, he reveals Vicky as the murderer of Yiu-chung, Yiu-cho and Yee-ting. Later, an assassin chases Peter and Vicky and the latter was stabbed multiple times during the process. However, she does not feel any pain and manages to call the police. Carrie sympathizes Vicky's encounter of strange events and lets Vicky to be with Peter. When Peter and Vicky were taking their wedding photo, however, Vicky is not visible in the photo.

==== Cast ====
- Claudia Lau as Vicky Cheung (張明慧), Peter's ex-girlfriend who was killed by her half-siblings, but comes back to seek revenge.
- Tam Yat-ching as Leung kin-hoi (梁健海), an employee of Chu's Corporation who attacked Cheuk-nam.
- Wong San as Chu Chak-sing (朱澤成), a business tycoon and Vicky's biological father who uses the alias, Uncle Chan to communicate with her.
- Chan Yin-hong as an employee of Chu's Corporation
- Leung Chiu-ho as an employee of Chu's Corporation
- Mannor Chan as Ting Yung (丁蓉), Chak-sing's wife and mother of Yiu-chung, Yiu-cho and Yee-ting. She kills her husband and also lures Vicky to kill her children.
- Mak Ka-lun as Chu Yiu-chung (朱耀宗), Chak-sing and Yung's son who was killed by Vicky.
- Au Siu-wai as Chu Yiu-cho (朱耀祖), Chak-sing and Yung's son who was killed by Vicky.
- Lam Pui-kwan as Chu Yee-ting (朱綺婷), Chak-sing and Yung's daughter who was killed by Vicky.
- Ho Pik-kwan as Lawyer Tsang (曾律師)
- Siu Cheuk-yiu as the assassin hired by Chak-sing's children to kill Vicky.
- Wong Kin-fung as a director.

=== Disappearance (人間蒸發; Episodes 18-20) ===
==== Plot ====
Pauline agrees to Cheuk-nam's marriage proposal, and Carrie feels helpless as she is waiting for Peter to propose. When Carrie was considering to work in Singapore with Chau-ping, Peter finally proposes and she is overjoyed. Choi-tip picks a date for them to marry, but she calculates that Peter will face a major disaster. Peter's father, Chi-wing, encounters a ship accident and when he made it to Hong Kong, he was knocked down by a car. People were shocked to see Chi-wing still looking youthful. Peter then sees Chi-wing at his old home and cannot accept him as his father. Carrie later finds out Chi-wing is psychic. Carrie's colleague, Kwai (Willie Wai), has mental issues and often waits for her outside of the television station after work. Kwai becomes jealous after learning that Peter and Carrie are getting married. Later, a space-timer (Danny Summer) arrives to take Chi-wing. Chi-wing predicts that Peter will be stabbed, although Peter disregards it. Chi-wing then rushes to a hotel just in time to prevent Kwai from stabbing Peter. However, Chi-wing was stabbed and hospitalized and Peter feels guilty and finally accepts Chi-wing as his father. Chi-wing's body rapidly ages and finally leaves with the space-timer. When Peter and Carrie visits Chi-wing at the hospital, they find him missing leaving a note stating he came to the wrong space-time. On the eve of Peter and Carries' wedding, Carrie goes to karaoke with her friends and encounter Kwai there. Kwai kidnaps Carrie, and Cheuk-nam gets lost while searching for her. Peter finds Carrie using the wedding ring. Kwai was about to stab Peter but was stopped by Carrie, who was stabbed instead. Kwai then suicides. When Peter carries Carrie down the hill, Carrie dies on the way. Greatly upset, Peter sits by sea on Valentine's Day where the space-timer appears and Peter begs him to rewrite history. Peter then travels back in time and rushes to save Carrie but was knocked by a car on the way. Peter wakes up the next day and rushes to stop Kwai and takes his knife away, but Kwai takes out another knife and stabs Carrie. Fortunately, Cheuk-nam sent a helicopter to rescue Carrie to the hospital, and Peter and Carrie can finally get married.

==== Cast ====
- Danny Summer as the space-timer who can allow people to travel through time.
- Willie Wai as Kwai (阿貴), nicknamed the Prince of the TV Station (電視台王子), Carrie's mentally disturbed colleague who has a crush on her.
- Chan Tik-hak as a clown.
- Ling Hon as Uncle Cheung (祥伯).
