= Fen Juhua =

Chinese Peking opera singer (1900–1994)

- Born: 1900; Shandong, Qing China
- Died: 1994 (aged 93–94); Hong Kong
- Other names: Fan Fok-fa
- Occupation(s): Peking opera performer, teacher
- Notable work: Heroine Li Feifei (1925)

Chinese name
- Chinese: 粉菊花
Transcriptions
Standard Mandarin
- Hanyu Pinyin: Fěn Júhuā
- Wade–Giles: Fen^{3} Chü^{2}hua^{1}
Yue: Cantonese
- Hong Kong Romanisation: Fan Fok-fa

Fen Juhua (Chinese: 粉菊花; pinyin: Fěn Jǘhuā, 1900–1994), also known in Hong Kong as Fan Fok-fa, was a Chinese opera singer and martial artist. Born in Shandong, she took up Peking opera as a youth, gaining a reputation for portraying martial women. In the 1940s, she moved to Hong Kong, where she began teaching Peking opera and martial arts through the Fen Juhua Opera Troupe and the Spring and Autumn Drama School.

== Biography ==
=== Early life and career ===
Fen was born Shandong in 1900. An active child, she trained her agility by binding her feet before fetching water. In her youth, Fen trained as a Peking opera singer under Niu Fenglan. She learned a variety of roles, both martial and civil, and gained recognition for her ability to portray a woman who had experienced foot binding.

In the late 1910s, Fen joined the Gong Theatre, acting alongside Xiao Yang Yuelou and Zhou Xinfang. She also acted with the Tianchan Theatre, alongside Gai Jiaotian. With the Qianku Great World Theatre in Shanghai, she portrayed the courtesan Wang Lianying in an opera about her murder, culminating with a sequence in which the character's ghost confronts her killers at Senluo Temple. Other performances for which Fen gained recognition included Yin Yang River, Red Plum Pavilion, Sizhou City, and Daxi Huangzhuang.

Fen starred in Heroine Li Feifei (女俠李飛飛) in 1925, one of China's earliest wuxia films. Advertisements described her as "zooming across rooftops and jumping up walls". In this film, she portrayed a knight-errant named Li Feifei who, through her actions, makes it possible for a couple to marry for love despite efforts to separate them. She has thus been identified variously as "the first warrior woman of Shanghai cinema" and the "first of the lady knights in the Chinese cinema."

=== Hong Kong ===
After the end of the Second Sino-Japanese War, Fen travelled to Hong Kong. With the support of the banker Li Guoxiang, she put on Peking opera performances. The newspaper editor Jiang Ling (江陵) urged her to teach the opera, and though Fen was hesitant due to her limited understanding of Cantonese, she soon formed the Fen Juhua Opera Troupe. This troupe was later formalized as the Spring and Autumn Drama School, with its first school building being constructed in the 1960s.

Initially, Fen exclusively trained women, including Connie Chan and Josephine Siao. Around 1962, she began taking on male students, such as John Lone, Chin Ka-lok, Lam Ching-ying, and Fung Hak-on. Students studied the opera and martial arts, with drills including handstands against walls, splits, kicks, and leg-lifts. Punishment was collective, and included verbal reprimands and beatings with a rattan cane.

Fen appeared in several films, beginning with General Chai and Lady Balsam (1953) and including General Chai and Lady Balsam (1956) and The Invincible Yeung Generals (1961). She starred in the film The Capture of the Evil Demons in 1962. This film, an adaptation of Sizhou City directed by Wong Hok-sing, featured Fen as a warrior who ascends to godhood after defeating a water demon. It featured several of Fen's students in roles, including Chan Ho-kau as the titular demon, as well as a sequence in which Fen performs acrobatics while carrying buckets of water.

Fen died in Hong Kong in 1994.

== Works cited ==
- Cheng Hsiao-yuan (程筱媛) (2024). 被搬演的真實: 1920 年代上海時事戲《槍斃閻瑞生》 [Reality on Stage: Executing Yen Ruisheng, a 1920's Topical Drama in Shanghai]. Journal of Chinese Ritual, Theatre & Folklore (in Chinese) (223): 49–89.
- Cheung, Milky (2019). "The 'Spring and Autumn' of Peking and Cantonese Traditions: Fen Ju Hua and the Capture of the Evil Demons". In Ng, May; Wong, Natasha (eds.). Heritage and Integration: A Study of Hong Kong Cantonese Opera Films (PDF). Translated by Ng, Rachel. Hong Kong: Hong Kong Film Archive. pp. 140–151. Archived from the original (PDF) on 23 December 2022.
- Funnell, Lisa (2014). Warrior Women: Gender, Race, and the Transnational Chinese Action Star. Albany: SUNY Press. ISBN 978-1-4384-5249-4.
- Ngo, Sheau-shi (2011). "The Shaw Brothers' Wuxia Pian: An Early Identity and Business-Cultural Connection for the Chinese in Malaya" (PDF). Kajian Malaysia. 29: 75–93. Archived from the original (PDF) on 18 March 2024.
- Stokes, Lisa Odham; Braaten, Rachel (2020). Historical Dictionary of Hong Kong Cinema. London: Rowman & Littlefield. ISBN 978-1-5381-2062-0.
- Teo, Stephen (2015). Chinese Martial Arts Cinema. Edinburgh: Edinburgh University Press. doi:10.1515/9781474403887-005. ISBN 978-1-4744-0388-7.
