= For Better, for Worse (1959 film) =

1959 Hong Kong film by Yueh Feng

- Film poster
- Traditional Chinese: 雨過天青
- Simplified Chinese: 雨过天青
- Literal meaning: rain passes [into] blue sky
- Hanyu Pinyin: yǔ guò tiān qīng
- Directed by: Yueh Feng
- Written by: Yueh Feng
- Produced by: Robert Chung
- Starring: Helen Li Mei; Yang Chang; Feng Su; Connie Chan
- Cinematography: Jie Fan
- Edited by: Wang Chao-Hsi
- Music by: Chi Hsiang-Tang
- Production company: Motion Picture & General Investment
- Release date: 20 August 1959 (Hong Kong)
- Running time: 88 minutes
- Country: Hong Kong
- Language: Mandarin

For Better, for Worse (Chinese: 雨過天青) is a 1959 Hong Kong drama film written and directed by Yueh Feng. The film was selected as the Hong Kong entry for the Best Foreign Language Film at the 32nd Academy Awards, but was not accepted as a nominee.

== Cast ==
- Helen Li Mei as Meijuan
- Yang Chang as Gao Yongsheng
- Feng Su as Xiujuan
- Connie Chan as Damei
- Xiaoyu Deng as Xiaohu (as Peter Dunn)
- Xiang Gao as Landlord's Wife
- Yunzhong Li as Yongsheng's Brother-in-law
- Enjia Liu as Mr. Zhao - The Landlord
- Qianmeng Liu as Yongsheng's Sister
- Ching Tien as Li Zixin

== See also ==
- List of submissions to the 32nd Academy Awards for Best Foreign Language Film
- List of Hong Kong submissions for the Academy Award for Best Foreign Language Film
