= Wudan =

Female role type in Chinese opera

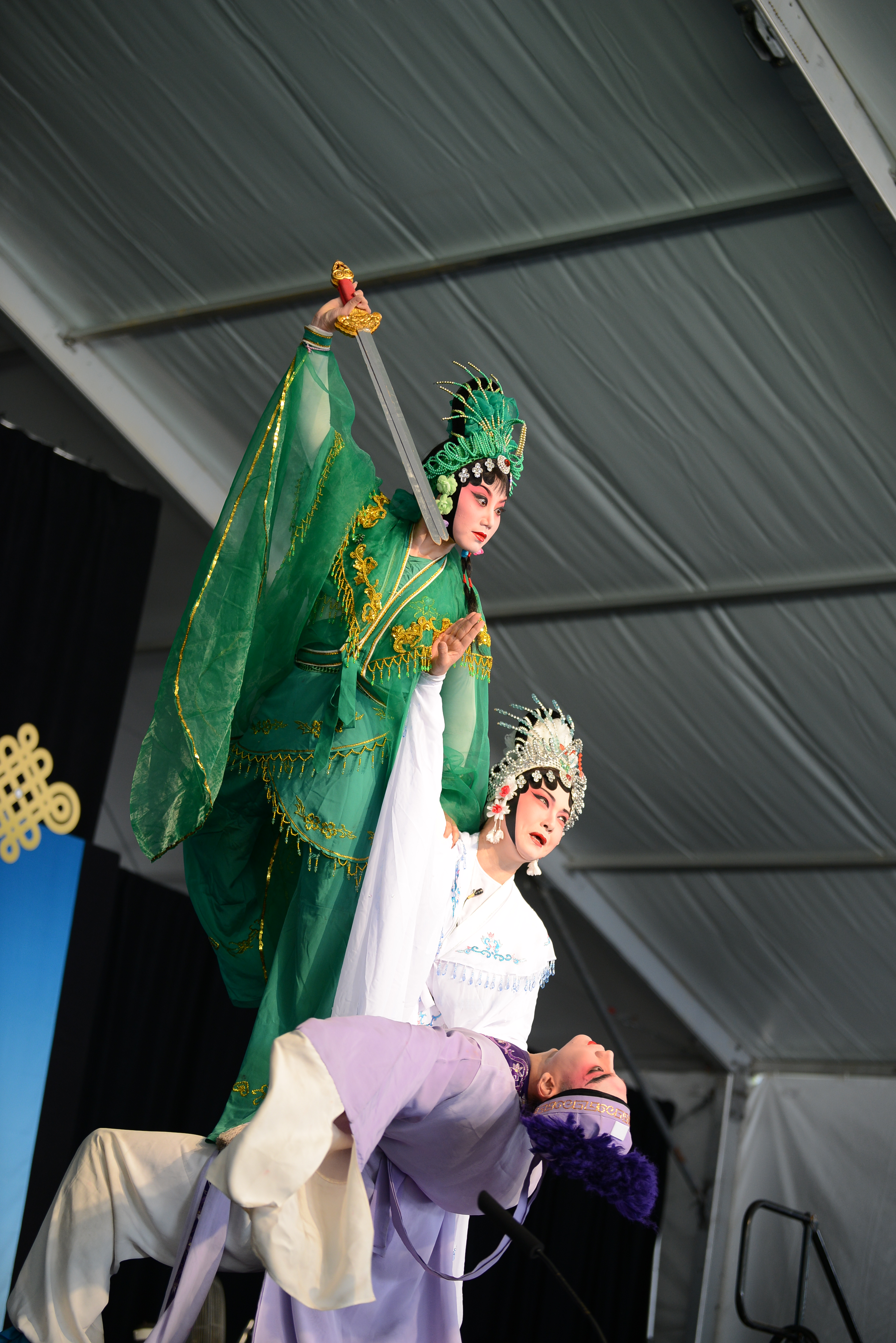
Xiao Qing, the female snake with two jian (swords), is often portrayed by wudan actresses, in this case by Wu opera star Yang Xiayun (杨霞云).

The wudan (Chinese: 武旦; pinyin: wǔdàn; lit. 'martial female') is a female role type in Chinese opera and a subtype of the dan. Wudan characters are warrior maidens in combat, and wudan actors (almost always actresses) must be trained in martial arts with theatrical versions of traditional weapons, as well as in acrobatics and gymnastics.

The hair and makeup is similar to that of other young dan roles.

== Subtypes ==
The wudan can be further divided into two subtypes, the duanda wudan and the daomadan; the latter wears an "armor" on-stage.

=== Duanda wudan ===
The duanda wudan (Chinese: 短打武旦; pinyin: duǎndǎ wǔdàn; lit. 'short-shirt wudan') is a female who fights independently of a horse or an army. It can be a female youxia, like the heroine of Hongxian; or a supernatural being who has transformed itself into a women, like Bai Suzhen and Xiao Qing from the Legend of the White Snake. In Peking opera, the zhan'ao zhanqun (戰襖戰裙; "martial shirt, martial skirt") costume is worn, which consists of a jacket, a skirt, and trousers; as are additional skirt flaps and flat ankle boots known as xiaomanxue (小蠻靴; "small barbarian boots").

A Cantonese opera actress portrays a daomadan character, holding a poled qiang (spear) in her hands.

=== Daomadan ===
The changkao wudan (simplified Chinese: 长靠武旦; traditional Chinese: 長靠武旦; pinyin: chángkào wǔdàn; lit. 'long-armor wudan'), better known as the daomadan (刀马旦; 刀馬旦; dāomǎdàn; 'blade-horse female'), is a woman, often an army commander, who fights on horseback in battles. Popular daomadan characters include Mu Guiying from the Generals of the Yang Family and Hu Sanniang from the Water Margin. In Peking opera, the daomadan wears a long "female armor" (女靠; nükào), which is similar to that worn by their male counterparts but with flower and phoenix embroidery as well as multicolored streamers hanging from the waist. The armor is usually in red or pink. The armor restricts movement, so the daomadan is less acrobatic compared to the duanda wudan. For more freedom a "reformed armor" (改良靠; gǎiliángkào), which lacks the four flags in the back and fits more closely to the body, can be worn. Her helmet is attached to two lingzi (long pheasant feathers). The commonly used weapon is a long-poled dao (blade) or qiang (spear).

== Skills ==
In addition to singing, wudan actresses must also be trained in martial arts, gymnastics, and acrobatics, just like their male counterparts (wusheng). A unique skill for the wudan actress is "kicking the spears" (打出手; dǎchūshǒu; 'beat out-of hand') which is unused in wusheng roles. In such a combat scene the wudan is in the middle of the stage surrounded by her enemies, each holding a couple of light double-headed spears with tassels at each ends. The enemies toss their spears for the heroine to kick back in various ways, which is meant to mimic deflections in battles. The result is fast-paced action (if the actress is good) with many spears flying through air simultaneously.

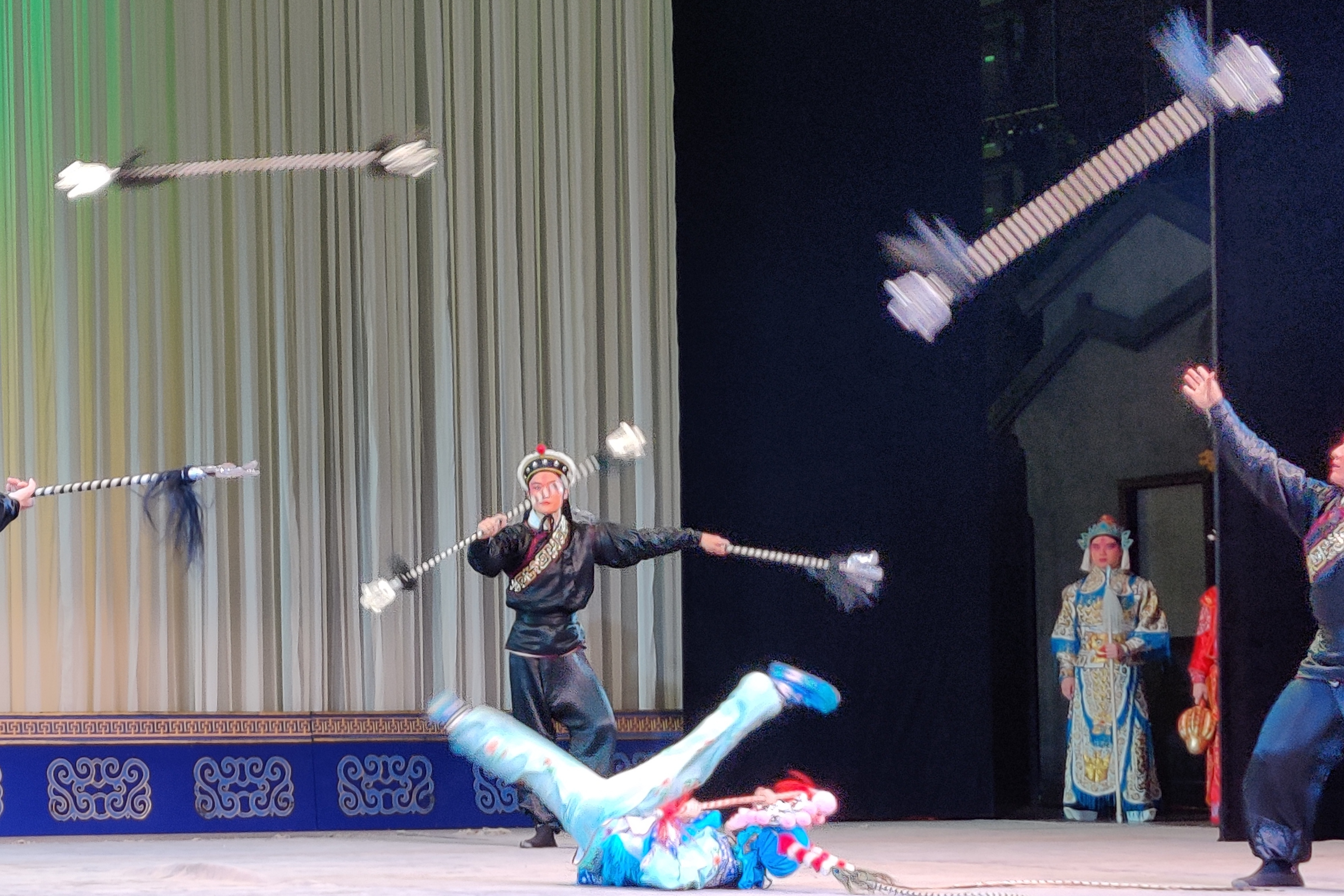
Dachushou, or kicking back spears from various directions without dropping them is a required skill for wudan actresses. This photo is from a Shao opera.

== Cross-gender acting ==
Male wudan actors are extremely rare. Yang Rui-Yu (楊瑞宇), a Taiwanese Peking opera performer who graduated from the National Academy of Chinese Theatre Arts in Beijing, has been called the only active male wudan actor. He is with Wu Hsing-kuo's Contemporary Legend Theatre (當代傳奇劇場).

On the other hand, it's common for (shorter) wudan actresses to play males, i.e. wawasheng (Chinese: 娃娃生; pinyin: wáwáshēng; lit. 'child male') or boy characters who can fight with weapons. These include Liu Chenxiang from The Magic Lotus Lantern, Zhao Wu from The Orphan of Zhao, and Yang Wenguang from Women Generals of the Yang Family.

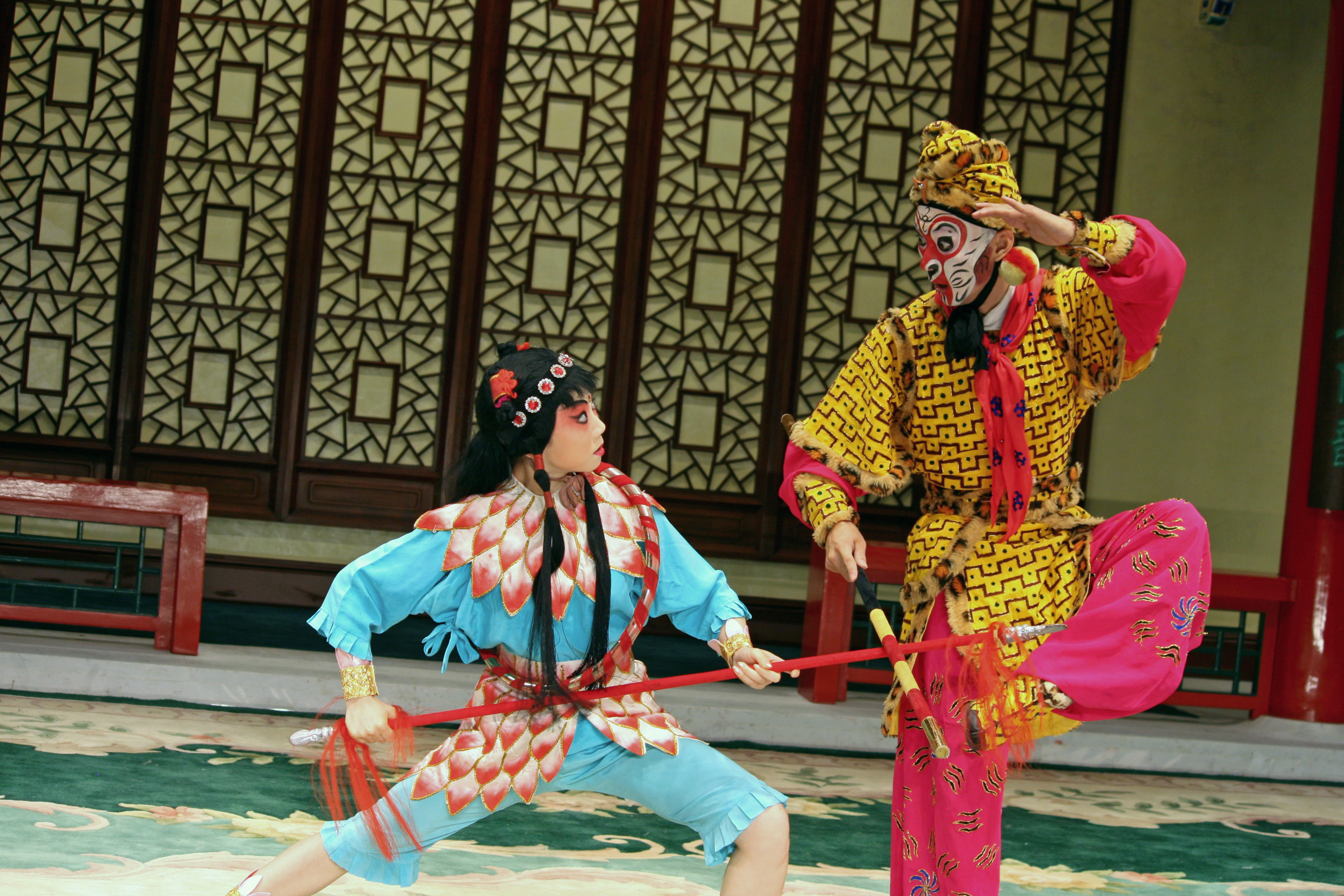
Nezha, always a boy in Chinese folklore, is played by a wudan actress in this Peking opera.
