= Yu Jim-yuen =

Chinese-American martial artist, actor and teacher

- Born: September 5, 1905; Beijing, China
- Died: September 8, 1997 (aged 92); Los Angeles, California, U.S.
- Years active: 1940–1970
- Children: Yu So Chow, Yu Chee Yan

Chinese name
- Traditional Chinese: 于占元
- Simplified Chinese: 于占元
Transcriptions
Standard Mandarin
- Hanyu Pinyin: Yú Zhānyuán
Yue: Cantonese
- Jyutping: Jyu1 Zim1 Jyun4

Yu Jim-yuen (September 5, 1905 – September 8, 1997) (Chinese: 于占元; pinyin: Yú Zhānyuán; Jyutping: jyu1 zim1 jyun4) was a Chinese martial artist, actor, teacher and the master of the China Drama Academy, one of the main Peking Opera Schools in Hong Kong, from which Jackie Chan, Sammo Hung, Yuen Biao, Yuen Qiu, Yuen Wah, and Corey Yuen received their training. Yuen Woo-ping attended the school for one year as a day student as well. Jim-yuen was also the father of early wuxia actress Yu So-chow, who appeared in more than 150 movies, but his only film was his starring role as Grandmaster Wen Ren-yang in the 1979 action film The Old Master (師父出馬). He died of a heart attack in Los Angeles, California, United States.

In 1988, the film Painted Faces was released. The story dealt with the lives of the children in the China Drama Academy, and Sammo Hung played the part of Master Yu.

== See also ==
- Peking Opera School
- Peking opera
