= K-100 (TV series) =

- Genre: Entertainment
- Opening theme: "非一般的晚上" by Wyman Wong
- Country of origin: Hong Kong
- Original language: Cantonese
- No. of episodes: 1449

Production
- Producer: TVB
- Production location: Hong Kong
- Running time: 30 minutes

Original release
- Network: TVB Jade
- Release: 22 January 1977 – 17 September 2005

Related
- E-Buzz

K-100 was an entertainment information programme which was shown on Hong Kong's Television Broadcasts Limited (TVB). The program provided information about upcoming and latest shows airing on TVB. It also featured interviews with celebrities who work for the station, and behind-the-scenes peeks at the station's studio complex (電視廣播城). In addition, K-100 also announced the station's top-five shows over the previous week in terms of viewership during the "Viewership Ratings" segment (收視龍虎榜).

The name "K-100" originated from the station's previous post office box number, with the "K-" prefix indicating that the box was located in Kowloon. The station's PO box was re-numbered to "70100" following the postal service's consolidation of its PO boxes, but the programme's name stuck.

The program debuted on 22 January 1977, and ran almost every week until 17 September 2005, when it was replaced by another show called "E-Buzz". 1,449 episodes of K-100 had been taped since its inception.
