= Yu So-chow =

Chinese actress

- Born: 9 July 1930; Beijing, China
- Died: 12 May 2017 (aged 86); San Francisco, California, U.S.
- Other name: Yu So-Chau
- Occupation: Actress
- Years active: 1948–1966
- Spouse: Mak Bing-wing (m. 1966; died 1984)
- Father: Yu Jim Yuen

Chinese name
- Traditional Chinese: 于素秋
- Simplified Chinese: 于素秋
Transcriptions
Standard Mandarin
- Hanyu Pinyin: Yú Sùqiū

Yu So-chow (Chinese: 于素秋; pinyin: Yú Sù Qiū; Cantonese Yale: yū sou chāu; 9 July 1930 – 12 May 2017) is a former Chinese actress from Hong Kong. Yu has a star at Avenue of Stars in Hong Kong.

== Early life ==
Yu was born in Beijing, China. Yu came from a Peking opera family. Her father was Yu Jim-yuen, who ran the China Drama Academy, a Peking Opera School in Hong Kong.

== Career ==
Yu learned Peking Opera at the age of eight and made her stage debut at the age of nine. She specialized in playing female warrior roles in which she could skillfully demonstrate her footwork by continuously juggling and kicking back twelve red-tasselled tuo shou (脫手) spears, as seen in one of her famous stage Peking operas, The White Snake (白蛇傳), and in the 1951 film Amazon on the Sea (海上女霸王).

Yu started her acting career in 1948. Yu made over 240 films in the wuxia, kung fu, action, detective and Cantonese opera genres. Her films were successful at the box-office and she was one of the most popular superstars of the 1960 in Asia and Hong Kong.

Her first movie was made in 1948. She was one of the three actresses in the 1950s who really knew martial arts. Off the screen, she was virtually a heroine: at the age of sixteen, she alone successfully fought off a group of gangsters with only a silky belt on the streets of Shanghai.

Her early wuxia pictures from 1948 to 1957 were in both Mandarin and Cantonese dialogue, with stories intended to increase cooperation of the Northern Style and Southern Style of martial arts, as seen in The heroine of deadly darts (女俠響尾追魂鏢) in 1956. These remarkable wuxia films were mostly based on kung fu novels, e.g. Burning of the Red Lotus Monastery Pt 1 & Pt 2 (火燒紅蓮寺) in 1950, The Golden Hairpin Pt 1 & Pt 3 (碧血金釵) in 1963, Buddha’s Palm (如來神掌), a four-part film, in 1964 and The Burning of Pingyang City (火燒平陽城) in 1965.

Her performances in Cantonese opera were quite different; she brought in a mixture of Peking Opera, in which she performed a lot of footwork, as in Suet Ting Shan and Fan Lai Hua - Meeting on the Weedy River (蘆花河會母) in 1961, Giving birth on the bridge – the White serpent (斷橋產子) in 1962 and How Zhong Wuyan Conquered the West (鍾無艷掛帥征西) in 1962. She also played a male lead as seen in movies Execution of Lui Po at Pak Moon Lau (白門樓斬呂布) in 1961, Two hunters in a pursuit (文武狀元爭彩鳳) in 1962 and The beauties (陣陣美人威) in 1964.

Apart from action films, she did a few rare contemporary and melodrama films, for example Midsummer night’s romance (夏夜之戀) in 1953, Bachelors beware (溫柔鄉) in 1960 and Two mouthy ladies from the north and south (南北鐵咀雞) in 1965. Her golden age of filming was between 1963 and 1966, when she made at least thirty movies in a year. Her surprise roles in The big revenge part 1 and 2 (灕江河畔血海仇) (1963) and Heaven, Hell and Crystal Palace (天堂地獄水晶宮) (1965) did not destroy her popularity nor upset her fans; instead they won the hearts of the audience. Her last major movie was filmed in Taiwan (Decree of the fire dragon (血火龍令) in 1968) and she made a guest appearance in Secret agent no.1 (神探一號) in 1970.

In 2004, Yu was one of the celebrities honoured on the Avenue of Stars, Hong Kong. To date, Yu still holds the record among actresses of making more than 170 wuxia movies.

== Personal life ==
Yu ended her acting career after she married, in 1966, Mak Bing-wing (Chinese: 麥炳榮; 1915–1984), a Chinese actor active in Cantonese opera. Mak Bing-wing began his acting career in the 1930s. He left Hong Kong in 1941 for a tour of the United States, returning in 1947 after the Pacific War had ended.

While in the United States, Mak appeared in numerous Grandview Film Company productions.

Yu was his second wife. They had three children and later moved to the United States.

On May 12, 2017. Yu died of pneumonia in San Francisco, California. She was 86 years old.

== Filmography ==
=== Films ===
This is a partial list of films.

- 1949 The revenge of the great swordsman Assassin Zhang Wenxiang (大俠復仇記)
- 1951 The five heroes'deadly spears (五虎斷魂槍)
- 1952 A story of three lovers, pt 1 & 2 (啼笑姻緣上下集)
- 1952 A heroine from Mount Emei (峨嵋女俠)
- 1957 The dragon-phoenix swordsmen(龍鳳雙劍俠)
- 1960 The strange hero conquered the dragon(怪俠赤屠龍)
- 1961 Conqueress(無敵楊家將)
- 1961 Secret Book (Part 1, Part 2) (aka The Magic Crane) - So Fei Fung
- 1962 The village militia, pt 1 & 2 (魔鏡神珠上下集)
- 1962 The blonde hair monster(黃毛怪人)
- 1962 The birth of the Monkey King(馬騮精出世)
- 1962 The Road to the west(唐三藏取西經)
- 1962 Ingentious swords, pt 1 & 2 (白骨陰陽劍上下集)
- 1963 Burning of the Red Lotus Monastery pt 1 & 2 (火燒紅蓮寺上下集)
- 1963 Valiant Pan An (武潘安)
- 1963 The iron wild goose pt 1 & 2(鐵雁霜翎上下集)
- 1963 The tiger in hunting(臥虎藏龍)
- 1963 Pat cham lau lan sai pat wan (不斬樓蘭誓不還)
- 1964 Spring blossoms(花開富貴錦城春)
- 1964 The Flying Fox(萬變飛狐) - Tik Siu-ching
- 1965 The invincible kid Fang Shiyu(無敵神童方世玉)
- 1965 The all-powerful flute pt 1 & 2(簫聲震武林上下集)
- 1966 Hero of midland(中原奇俠)
- 1966 Fire dragon and the mythical pearl(火龍神珠)
- 1966 Heroic days of the Great Ming Dynasty (斷臂神龍劍)
- 1966 The avengers' tale pt 1 & 2 (鐵血恩仇錄上下集)
- 1967 The Three Swordsmen

== Awards ==
- Star – Avenue of Stars, Tsim Sha Tsui waterfront in Hong Kong
