= Evan Yang =

- Born: November 26, 1920; Beijing, Republic of China
- Died: March 29, 1978 (aged 57); Hong Kong
- Other names: Yang Yanqi (simplified Chinese: 杨彦岐; traditional Chinese: 楊彥岐), Yi Wen (Chinese: 易文; pinyin: Yi Wen)
- Occupation: Film director
- Years active: 1948-1975

Chinese name
- Traditional Chinese: 易文
Transcriptions

Evan Yang (November 26, 1920 – March 29, 1978) was a Chinese film director, screenwriter, actor and songwriter from Hong Kong.

== Early life ==
On November 26, 1920, Yang was born in Wuhsien city, Jiangsu Province, China. Yang's father was Yang Qianli, a politician and university professor. His uncles and aunts include architect Yang Xiliu(S. J. Young), animator Cy Young, entrepreneur Yang Xiren and Yang Renlan (mother of sociologist Fei Xiaotong).

In 1925, Yang moved to Wu County, Jiangsu, his ancestral home. In 1937, he moved to Shanghai with his family.

In 1941, Yang graduated from St. John's University, Shanghai.

== Career ==
Yang met Hu Shih in Shanghai in. Hu Shih said 'Yang Yanqi is just 13 years old and likes reading literatures, have a inherited genius and must be uncommon ones.'

In 1936, Yang wrote his first script In The Era which was unaccepted.

Yang started writing film script in Hong Kong from 1948 and started using the name "Evan Yang" from 1951.

Yang was an editor in chief of Peace Daily Newspaper.

As a film director, Yang's early films were sombre and melancholic. Yang's first Hong Kong film as a film director was Notorious Woman, a 1953 Mandarin Drama. Yang became a film director for Cathay Studio. Yang directed more than 55 films. As a screenwriter, Yang also wrote more than 55 films.

Yang wrote lyrics from 1950s to early 1970s, and signed to EMI in 1967. He also wrote essays with other pen names.

Yang's film works include Air Hostess, The Story of a Fur Coat, Spring Song, Happily Ever After and Bachelors Beware, and lyrics works include The Second Spring, I'll Fly Into Sky, I Love Cha-cha, Spring Song.

== Filmography ==
=== Films ===
This is a partial list of films.

- 1953 Notorious Woman (a.k.a. The Activities of Miss Soo Lee, The Secret Life of Lady So Lee) - Director.
- 1955 Tokyo Interlude (a.k.a. Beauty of Tokyo) - Director.
- 1955 Blood Will Tell - Director.
- 1956 Blind Love (a.k.a. Always in My Heart) - Director.
- 1956 Madame Butterfly (a.k.a. Madam Butterfly) - Director.
- 1956 The Story of a Fur Coat - Screenwriter.
- 1957 Half Way Down (a.k.a. Haleway Down, Halfway Down) - Screenwriter.
- 1957 Holiday Express - Director, screenwriter.
- 1957 Mambo Girl - Director, screenwriter.
- 1959 Air Hostess - Director, screenwriter.
- 1959 48 Hours in Escape (a.k.a. Alias: 48 Hours Escape) - Director, screenwriter.
- 1959 Our Dream Car - Director, screenwriter.
- 1960 Forever Yours - Director, screenwriter.
- 1960 Happily Ever After - Director, screenwriter.
- 1960 Bachelors Beware - Director, screenwriter.
- 1961 Sun, Moon and Star - Director.
- 1962 It's Always Spring - Director.
- 1963 Because of Her - Director, screenwriter.
- 1970 The Magnificent Gunfighter (a.k.a. Magnificent Gunfighters, Gallant Gunfighter) - Director.
- 1976 Bruce Lee and I (a.k.a. Bruce Lee: His Last Days, His Last Nights) - Screenwriter.

== Personal life ==
Yang was a smoker. In 1978, Yang died from respiratory disease.
