= Tina Leung =

Hong Kong actress

- 狄娜
- Born: Leung Kwok-hing (Chinese: 梁幗馨); 1 January 1945; Xingning County, Guangdong Province, Republic of China
- Died: 31 March 2010 (aged 65); Hong Kong Sanatorium & Hospital, Hong Kong SAR, People's Republic of China
- Occupations: Actress; entrepreneur; political commentator
- Years active: 1962–1975
- Spouse: Ma Yizhang (1967–1972)
- Children: Michael Ma

Chinese name
- Traditional Chinese: 狄娜
- Simplified Chinese: 狄娜
Transcriptions
Standard Mandarin
- Hanyu Pinyin: Dí Nà
- Musical career
- Also known as: Tina Ti

Leung Kwok-hing
- Traditional Chinese: 梁幗馨
- Simplified Chinese: 梁帼馨
Transcriptions
Standard Mandarin
- Hanyu Pinyin: Liáng Guóxīn
Yue: Cantonese
- Yale Romanization: Lèuhng Gwok-hing
- Jyutping: Loeng^{4} Gwok^{3}-hing^{1}

Tina Leung Kwok-hing (Chinese: 梁幗馨; 1 January 1945 — 31 March 2010), also known by her stage name of Tina Ti or Di Na (Chinese: 狄娜), was a Hong Kong actress. Her credits include A Big Mess, One Day at a Time, Dark Rendezvous and The Warlord.

== Life and career ==
Aside from acting, she was also reportedly active in business and politics. In 2008, she acknowledged that she used to gather intelligence for the Chinese Communist Party in the 1960s.

She had a son, Michael Ma. She was diagnosed with cervical cancer in 2005. In 1998, she began the practice of Zung saang gei, which she credited with extending her life. She died in 2010 of organ failure.
