= Connie Chan (actor) =

Chinese actress (born 1947)

- Chinese: 陳寶珠
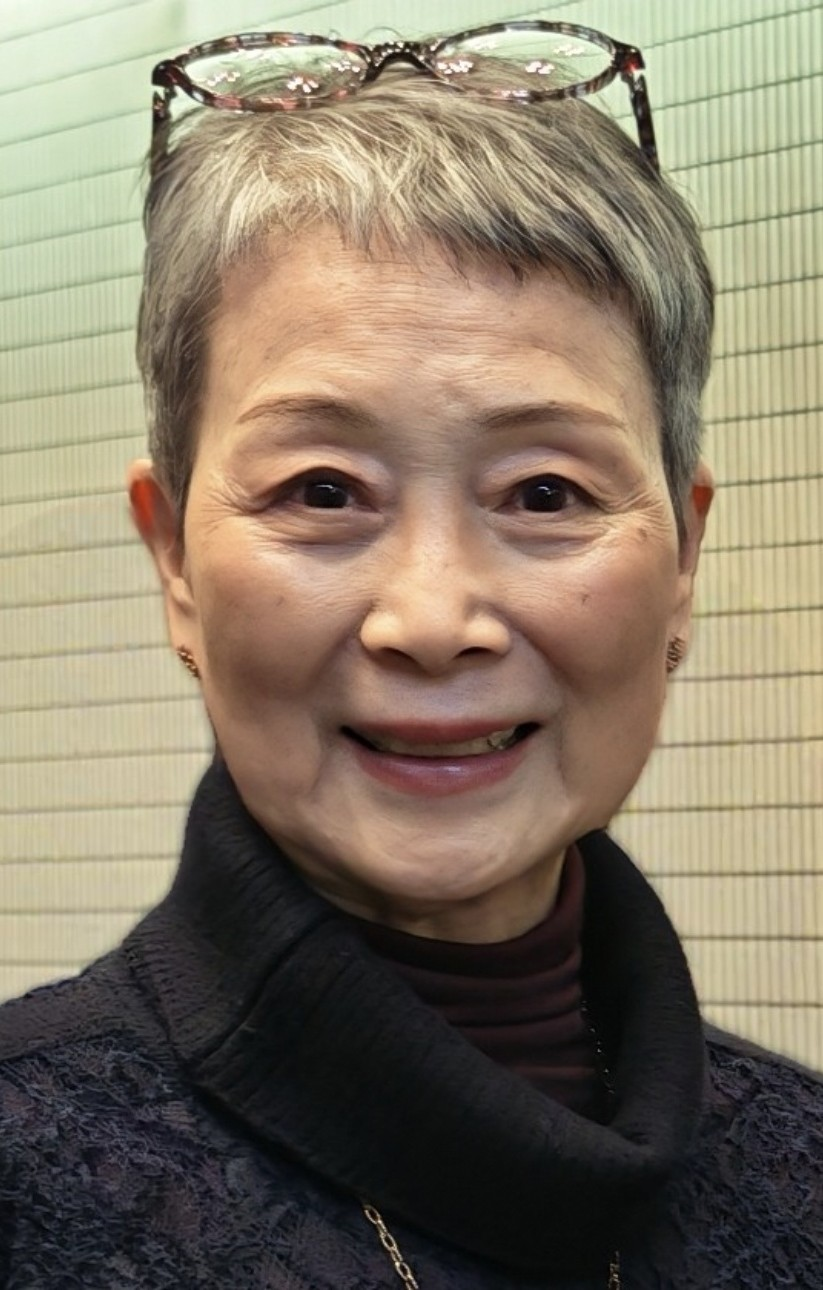
- Chan in December 2025
- Born: 1 January 1947 (age 79); Guangzhou, Guangdong, China
- Other names: Connie Chan Po-chu, Chan Poh-Chee, Chan Pao-Chu, Chen Po-Chu, Pearl Chan
- Occupations: Singer; actress
- Years active: 1956–present
- Spouse: Jimmy Yeung (1974–1982)
- Children: Dexter Young (b. 1975)

Chinese name
- Traditional Chinese: 陳寶珠
- Simplified Chinese: 陈宝珠
Transcriptions
Standard Mandarin
- Hanyu Pinyin: Chén Bǎozhū
Yue: Cantonese
- Jyutping: Can^{4} Bou^{2} Zyu^{1}
- Musical career
- Origin: Hong Kong
- Genres: Cantonese opera, Cantopop
- Instrument: Singing

Connie Chan Po-chu (Chinese: 陳寶珠, born 1 January 1947) is a Chinese actor who has made more than 230 films in a variety of genres, from traditional Cantonese opera and wuxia movies to contemporary youth musicals; action films to comedies; melodramas and romances. Owing to her popularity, she was dubbed "The Movie-Fan Princess". During the 1960s, Connie Chan was one of Hong Kong cinema's most beloved teen idols.

Chan is one of at least nine siblings who were born to impoverished parents in Guangdong, China. To increase their children's chances of survival, Chan's birth parents gave away some of their youngest to other families. Chan was adopted by renowned Cantonese opera stars Chan Fei-nung and Kung Fan-hung. Her godfather is actor Cho Tat Wah. She has a son named Dexter Yeung, who stars in the 2008 TVB series Wasabi Mon Amour and Moonlight Resonance.

== Early life and career ==
At the age of five-and-a-half, she started learning Cantonese opera from her adoptive parents, later becoming an apprentice of Peking opera master Fen Juhua, who was one of the first wuxia actresses in Shanghai during the 1920s. When Connie was nine, she began performing onstage. One year later, she and Leung Bo-chu – daughter of the great comic actor and opera clown Leung Sing-po – were the leading stars of the Double Chu Opera Troupe. In 1958, Connie made her film debut in the Cantonese opera Madam Chun Heung-lin. The following year, she played in two Mandarin-language productions for the MP&GI studio: as a widow's daughter in Yue Feng's melodrama For Better, For Worse, and as a young boy in Tao Qin's comedy The Scout Master. That same year, she also played the role of a filial son in Breaking the Coffin to Rescue Mother.

During her teenage years, Connie appeared more and more frequently on the silver screen – at first, mostly in Cantonese operas, often with the legendary Master Yam Kim-fai, who had taken Connie as her beloved student; but later, almost exclusively in wuxia movies, usually in the company of veteran action stars Yu So Chow, Cho Tat Wah, and perennial bad guy Shih Kien. She also joined the Sin-Hok Kong-luen Film Company's stable of young stars – which included Suet Nei, Nancy Sit Ka-yin, and Kenneth Tsang Kong – and took part in director Chan Lit-ban's ground-breaking adaptations of Jin Yong's serialised novels The Golden Hairpin (1963–64) and The Snowflake Sword (1964). Released in three and four parts, these films were blockbuster extravaganzas, popular for their intricate plots, special effects, and complex action choreography. Two films in 1965 would give a boost to Chan's career: The Six-Fingered Lord of the Lute, in which she played the lead male role and was publicised with the creation of her very own fan-club; and The Black Rose, in which director Chor Yuen had the foresight to change her image by putting her in a contemporary role as a modern-day Robin Hood.

In 1966, her most frequent on-screen partner was Josephine Siao, who had also studied opera under Fen Juhua. The two were often cast as disciples of the same master and sometimes – when Connie played the male lead – as young heroes in love. Capitalizing on their chemistry, veteran director Lee Tit gave them the lead roles in Eternal Love, his remake of a popular opera from the 1950s. Even more successful was Chan Wan's Colourful Youth, which became the box office champ of the year and set the trend for Western-style musicals in Cantonese cinema. From then on, Connie and Josephine appeared increasingly in films with contemporary settings, but less frequently in each other's company; both were paired off with a variety of leading men in a profusion of comedies, musicals, romances, and action movies. Movie-Fan Princess was a prototype combo of all four genres, and more significantly, was the beginning of Connie's four-year on-screen romance with her most popular leading man, Lui Kei. Then, there was Lady Bond, Cantonese cinema's answer to 007, which spawned three sequels and fueled the transition from traditional wuxia pictures to contemporary action movies.

Connie's frenetic film output of the previous two years started to slow; her contemporary action films had played themselves out, and she settled down on-screen with leading man Lui Kei, who now became her most frequent costar in a medley of comedies, musicals, and romances – most of them directed by Wong Yiu and Chan Wan, who were responsible for the Chi-luen Film Company's signature youth musicals. With the help of her mother, Connie founded her own film company in 1968. Hung Bo's inaugural feature Teenage Love (1968) paired her with Lui Kei. Connie's mother produced the film, and she and Connie's father had small roles. Love With a Malaysian Girl (1969) and Her Tender Love (1969), both written and directed by Lui Kei, were the only other films produced through Hung Bo. Within a year, Connie stopped making films altogether and moved to San Francisco to finish her education. When she returned to Hong Kong in 1972, she made one last film with director Chor Yuen, who had recently signed on with Shaw Brothers. The Lizard, a Mandarin-language production, was Connie's final farewell to the silver screen.

After an absence of more than 25 years, Connie Chan emerged from retirement in 1999 to star in a stage production based on the life of her Master, Yam Kim-fai. Sentimental Journey won great acclaim and broke records with its 100-performance run; it was brought back for a six-week revival in 2005. After Sentimental Journey, Connie starred alongside Tony Leung Ka-Fai and Carina Lau in the stage play Red Boat, which ran for 64 performances. The play is an homage to the Cantonese Opera troupes that traditionally travelled by boat through the Pearl River delta region of China. In 2003, she staged a series of spectacular concerts, delighting fans with her cherished film songs and some Cantonese opera classics; her guest stars included Fung Bo-bo, Nancy Sit Ka-yin, and Maggie Cheung Ho-yee, who played the character based on Connie in the TVB television series Old Time Buddy and the film Those Were the Days.

On 4 February 2006, she performed with the Hong Kong Chinese Orchestra. Later that year, she starred with Adam Cheng in the stage play Only You, which ran for 70 performances. In January 2007, Connie was honoured with a lifetime achievement award at the Hong Kong Drama Awards.

== Filmography ==
=== Selected filmography ===
Year	Title	Role	Notes	Ref.
1959	For Better, for Worse			
1959	Breaking the Coffin to Rescue Mother			
1960	The Unroyal Prince			
1960	Filial Piety			
1960	Good Humanity			
1961	Han Gong Gate			
1961	Beauty			
1962	The Monkey King Stormed the Sea Palace			
1962	Battle at Sizhou			
1962	How the Magic Boy on the Mythical Crane Slew the Dragon and Saved His Mother			
1963	The Golden Coat		Two-part film	
1963	Red Thread Steals a Precious Box			
1963–64	The Golden Hairpin		Four-part film	
1963–65	Story of the Sword and the Sabre		Four-part film	
1964	The Snowflake Sword		Four-part film	
1964	The Flying Fox		aka The Purple Lightning Sword	
1965	The Black Rose			
1965	The Six-Fingered Lord of the Lute		Three-part film	
1965	The Furious Buddha's Palm			
1966	Eternal Love			
1966	Movie-Fan Princess			
1966	Aftermath of a Fire		Two-part film	
1966	Girls Are Flowers	Ng Hoi-Yin		
1966	Lady Bond	Kong Yin		
1966	The Dutiful Daughter Zhu Zhu			
1966	Spy with My Face	Chan Mei-Ling		
1967	A Gifted Scholar and a Beautiful Maid	Lun Man-chui, a scholar	aka Merry Maid	
1967	A Girl's Secret			
1967	The Black and the White Cats			
1967	The Black Killer			
1967	The Black Swan	Lang Yan		
1967	The Brave Girl			
1967	The Charming Little Bird	Yuen-Ming, Stewardess Kau		
1967	First Love	Wong Yee-Wah		
1967	The Flying Killer	Kong Yin		
1967	Girl in Red			
1967	The Girl With Long Hair	Lok Oi-Lin		
1967	The Golden Swallow			
1967	Good Wife	Lan Chen, Wong Choi's wife		
1967	How the Sacred Fire Heroic Winds Defeat the Fire Lotus Array			
1967	The Iron Lady Against the One-Eyed Dragon			
1967	Lady With a Cat's Eye	Hoh Ling Chu		
1967	The Sweetest Moment	Lee Ching Yu		
1967	The Three Swordsmen			
1967	Waste Not Our Youth	Ching Wai-Bing		
1967	A Glamorous Christmas Night			
1967	Paragon of Sword and Knife			
1968	The Blossoming Rose	Ho Siu Ping		
1968	Opposite Love			
1968	Four Gentlemanly Flowers			
1968	The Reincarnation of Lady Plum Blossom			
1968	Won't You Give Me a Kiss?			
1968	Teenage Love			
1968	Young, Pregnant, and Unmarried			
1968	The Dragon Fortress			
1968	Beauty in the Mist			
1969	Love With a Malaysian Girl			
1969	Her Tender Love			
1970	The Young Girl Dares Not Homeward	Yu Feng	aka Girl Wanders Around	
1970	I'll Get You One Day	Lee Wai-Fung		
1972	The Lizard		last film role	

== Awards ==
- She has a star on the Avenue of Stars on the Tsim Sha Tsui waterfront in Kowloon, Hong Kong.

== Additional sources ==
- Chan Po-chu – The Princess of Movie Fans. Hong Kong: Urban Council of Hong Kong, 1999.
- The Making of Martial Arts Films – As Told By Filmmakers and Stars. Hong Kong: Urban Council of Hong Kong, 1999. ISBN 978-962-8050-06-2
- The Restless Breed: Cantonese Stars of the Sixties. Hong Kong: Urban Council of Hong Kong, 1996. ISBN 978-962-7040-50-7
- A Study of the Hong Kong Swordplay Film (1945–1980); Hong Kong: Urban Council of Hong Kong, 1981.
- Fonoroff, Paul. Silver Light: A Pictorial History of Hong Kong Cinema 1920–1970. Hong Kong: Joint Publishing, 1997. ISBN 978-962-04-1304-9
- Kar, Law and Frank Bren. Hong Kong Cinema: A Cross-Cultural View. Lanham, Maryland: Scarecrow Press, 2004. ISBN 978-0-8108-4986-0
- Teo, Stephen. Hong Kong Cinema: The Extra Dimensions. London: British Film Institute, 1997. ISBN 978-0-85170-514-9
