= History of cinema of China =

Motion pictures were introduced to China in 1896. They were introduced through foreign film exhibitors in treaty ports like Shanghai and Hong Kong. China was one of the earliest countries to be exposed to the medium of film, due to Louis Lumière sending his cameraman to Shanghai a year after inventing cinematography.

== Beginnings ==
While early accounts traditionally date the introduction of cinema to China to an anonymous variety show in August 1896 at Shanghai's Xu Garden teahouse, archival newspaper research by Dr Yongchun Fu demonstrates that this event was a magic lantern exhibition projecting still glass slides (yingxi). The historical record confirms that the first true motion picture exhibition in China occurred on May 22, 1897, when itinerant showman Harry Welby Cook projected celluloid film strips using Edison's Animatoscope at the Astor House Hotel in Shanghai. Later that summer, Cook also produced China's earliest localized actualities by filming local bicycle riders and swimming baths, before expanding his commercial film circuit north to Tianjin and Beijing. Chinese-made short melodrama and comedy films began emerging in 1913. In 1913, the first independent Chinese screenplay, The Difficult Couple, was filmed in Shanghai by Zheng Zhengqiu and Zhang Shichuan. Zhang Shichuan then set up the first Chinese-owned film production company in 1916. The first full-length feature film was Yan Ruisheng (閻瑞生) released in 1921, which was a docudrama about the killing of a Shanghai courtesan.

Chinese film production developed significantly in the 1920s. During the 1920s film technicians from the United States trained Chinese technicians in Shanghai, and American influence continued to be felt there for the next two decades. Since film was still in its earliest stages of development, most Chinese silent films at this time were only comic skits or operatic shorts, and training was minimal at a technical aspect due to this being a period of experimental film. Throughout the 1920s and 1930s, filmmaking in China was largely done by film studios and there was comparatively little small scale filmmaking.

Upscale movie theaters in China had contracts which required them to exclusively show Hollywood films, and thus as of the later 1920s, Hollywood films accounted for 90% of screen time in Chinese theaters.

After trial and error, China was able to draw inspiration from its own traditional values and began producing martial arts films, with the first being Burning of Red Lotus Temple (1928). Burning of Red Lotus Temple was so successful at the box office, the Star Motion Pictures (Mingxing) production later filmed 18 sequels, marking the beginning of China's esteemed martial arts films. Many imitators followed, including U. Lien (Youlian) Studio's Red Heroine (1929), which is still extant. It was during this period that some of the more important production companies first came into being, notably Mingxing and the Shaw brothers' Tianyi ("Unique"). Mingxing, founded by Zheng Zhengqiu and Zhang Shichuan in 1922, initially focused on comic shorts, including the oldest surviving complete Chinese film, Laborer's Love (1922). This soon shifted, however, to feature-length films and family dramas including Orphan Rescues Grandfather (1923). Meanwhile, Tianyi shifted their model towards folklore dramas and also pushed into foreign markets; their film White Snake (1926) (Note: Bai She Zhuan (1926) 白蛇传 : Legend of the White Snake Adaptation of Legend of the White Snake) proved a typical example of their success in the Chinese communities of Southeast Asia. In 1931, the first Chinese sound film Sing-Song Girl Red Peony was made, the product of a cooperation between the Mingxing Film Company's image production and Pathé Frères's sound technology. However, the sound was disc-recorded, which was then played in the theater in-sync with the action on the screen. The first sound-on-film talkie made in China was either Spring on Stage (歌場春色) by Tianyi, or Clear Sky After Storm by Great China Studio and Jinan Studio. Musical films, such as Song at Midnight (1937) and Street Angels (1937), starring Zhou Xuan, became one of the most popular film genres in China.

In the late 1920s, the ROC banned the adaptation of martial arts novels into films. The Nationalist government contended that the masses were superstitious and would take the fantastical elements of these narratives as factual.

News films increased in importance following the Japanese air raid on Shanghai in 1932. The bombing also destroyed significant amounts of the Chinese film industry and resulted in the loss of many early films.

=== Leftist movement ===
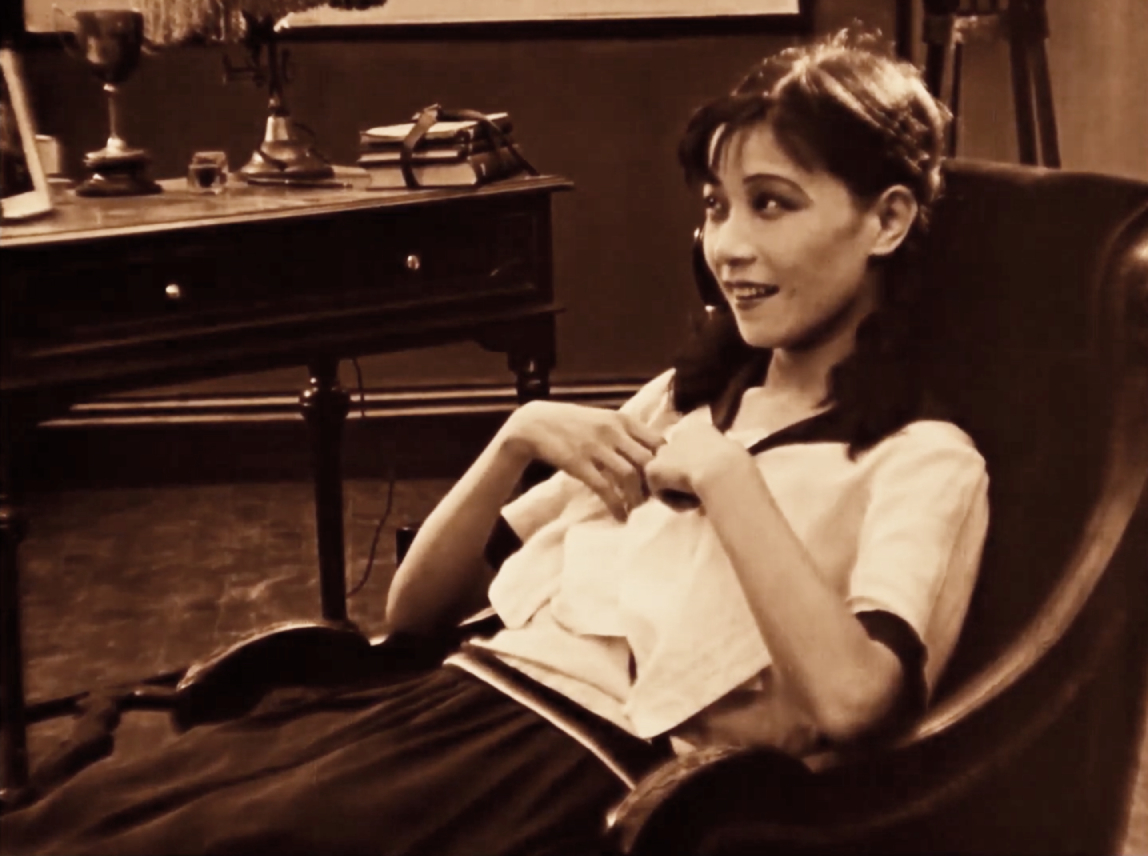
20-year-old Ruan Lingyu, a superstar during the silent film era, in Love and Duty (1931)

Many important Chinese films were produced beginning in the 1930s with the advent of the "progressive" or "left-wing" movement, including Cheng Bugao's Spring Silkworms (1933), Wu Yonggang's The Goddess (1934), and Sun Yu's The Great Road, also known as The Big Road (1934). These films were noted for their emphasis on class struggle and external threats (i.e. Japanese aggression), as well as on their focus on common people, such as a family of silk farmers in Spring Silkworms and a prostitute in The Goddess. In part due to the success of these kinds of films, this post-1930 era is now often referred to as the first "golden period" of Chinese cinema. The Leftist cinematic movement often revolved around the Western-influenced Shanghai, where filmmakers portrayed the struggling lower class of an overpopulated city.

As part of their strategy to use art as a medium for its political messages, the Chinese Communist Party (CCP) became active in Shanghai's film industry. Films with themes of women's liberation that were produced as a result of this strategy included the 1935 film Children of Troubled Times, the theme song of which (The March of the Volunteers) became the PRC's national anthem.

Three production companies dominated the market in the early to mid-1930s: the newly formed Lianhua ("United China"), (Note: Lianhua's original English name is "United Photoplay Service") the older and larger Mingxing and Tianyi. Both Mingxing and Lianhua leaned left (Lianhua's management perhaps more so), while Tianyi continued to make less socially conscious fare.

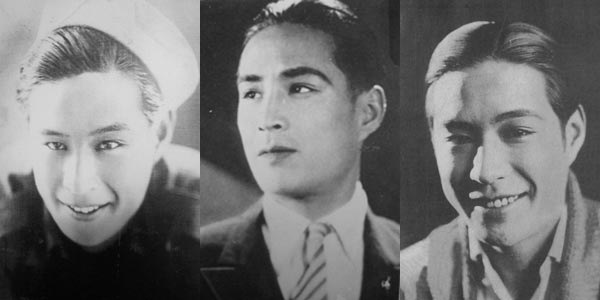
Jin Yan, a Korean-born Chinese actor featured in The Big Road (1935), who gained fame during China's golden age of cinema

The period also produced the first big Chinese movie stars, such as Hu Die, Ruan Lingyu, Li Lili, Chen Yanyan, Zhou Xuan, Zhao Dan and Jin Yan. Other major films of the period include Love and Duty (1931), Little Toys (1933), New Women (1934), Song of the Fishermen (1934), Plunder of Peach and Plum (1934), Crossroads (1937), and Street Angel (1937). Throughout the 1930s, the Nationalists and the CCP struggled for power and control over the major studios; their influence can be seen in the films the studios produced during this period.

=== Japanese occupation and World War II ===
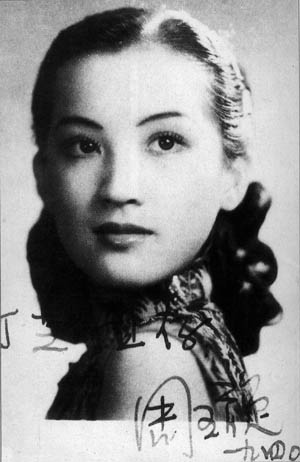
Zhou Xuan, an iconic Chinese singer and film actress

The start of the Second Sino-Japanese War in 1937, in particular the Battle of Shanghai, ended this golden run in Chinese cinema. All production companies except Xinhua Film Company ("New China") closed shop. A large number filmmakers left to join the War of Resistance, with many going to the Nationalist-controlled hinterlands to join the Nationalist film studios Central Motion Picture Studio or China Motion Picture Studio. A smaller number went to Yan'an or Hong Kong.

The Shanghai film industry, though severely curtailed, did not stop however, thus leading to the "Solitary Island" period (also known as the "Sole Island" or "Orphan Island"), with Shanghai's foreign concessions serving as an "island" of production in the "sea" of Japanese-occupied territory. It was during this period that artists and directors who remained in the city had to walk a fine line between staying true to their leftist and nationalist beliefs and Japanese pressures. Director Bu Wancang's Hua Mu Lan, also known as Mulan Joins the Army (1939), with its story of a young Chinese peasant fighting against a foreign invasion, was a particularly good example of Shanghai's continued film-production in the midst of war. This period ended when Japan declared war on the Western allies on 7 December 1941; the solitary island was finally engulfed by the sea of the Japanese occupation. With the Shanghai industry firmly in Japanese control, films like the Greater East Asia Co-Prosperity Sphere-promoting Eternity (1943) were produced.

By the 1930s and 1940s, both the Nationalist government and the CCP used documentary films as a form of propaganda.

During the 1930 and 1940s, both the Nationalist government and the Japanese occupation authorities sent mobile projectionist units into areas under their control to show propaganda films.

In the Yan'an Soviet during September 1938, the Eighth Route Army established its first film group. In 1943, the CCP released its first campaign film, Nanniwan, which sought to develop relationships between its forces and local people in the Yan'an area by showcasing the army's production campaign to alleviate material shortages.

Following Japan's unconditional surrender in August 1945, the Soviet Red Army helped the CCP to take over the Japanese colonial film establishment in Manchuria, the Manchukuo Film Association (Man-ei). Man-ei had state-of-the-art film production equipment and supplies. The former colonial studio was relocated to Hegang, where it was established as Northeastern Film Studio, the CCP's first full-capacity film studio. Yuan Muzhi was its director and Chen Bo'er was its party secretary. Northeastern Film Studio began production in early 1947, focusing on news and documentary films, as well as some fiction, educational film for children, and animation.

During the later phase of the Chinese Civil War, filmmakers trained in Yan'an and Northeastern Film Studio documented all the major battles leading to the CCP's defeat of the Nationalists.

== Second golden age ==
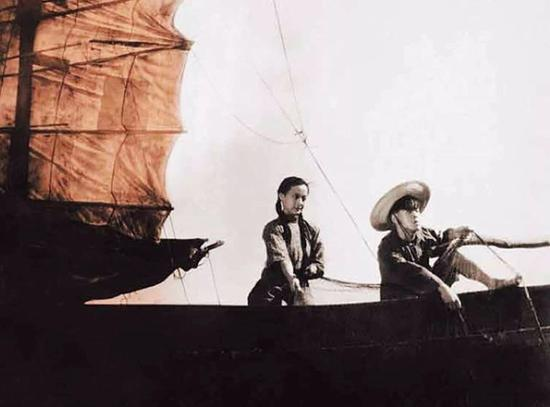
Wang Danfeng in the film New Fisherman's Song (1942)

The film industry continued to develop after 1945. Production in Shanghai once again resumed as a new crop of studios took the place that Lianhua and Mingxing studios had occupied in the previous decade. In 1945, Cai Chusheng returned to Shanghai to revive the Lianhua name as the "Lianhua Film Society with Shi Dongshan, Meng Junmou, and Zheng Junli." This in turn became Kunlun Studios, which would go on to become one of the most important studios of the era (Kunlun Studios merged with seven other studios to form Shanghai film studio in 1949), putting out the classics The Spring River Flows East (1947), Myriad of Lights (1948), Crows and Sparrows (1949), and Wanderings of Three-Hairs the Orphan, also known as San Mao, The Little Vagabond (1949). Many of these films showed the disillusionment with the oppressive rule of Chiang Kai-shek's Nationalist Party and the struggling oppression of nation by war. The Spring River Flows East, a three-hour-long two-parter directed by Cai Chusheng and Zheng Junli, was a particularly strong success. Its depiction of the struggles of ordinary Chinese during the Second Sino-Japanese war, replete with biting social and political commentary, struck a chord with audiences of the time.

Meanwhile, companies like the Wenhua Film Company ("Culture Films"), moved away from the leftist tradition and explored the evolution and development of other dramatic genres. Wenhua treated postwar problems in universalistic and humanistic ways, avoiding the family narrative and melodramatic formulae. Excellent examples of Wenhua's fare are its first two postwar features, Love Everlasting (Bu liaoqing, 1947) and Fake Bride, Phony Bridegroom (1947). Another memorable Wenhua film is Long Live the Missus (1947), like Love Everlasting with an original screenplay by writer Eileen Chang. Wenhua's romantic drama, Spring in a Small Town (1948), directed by Fei Mu shortly prior to the revolution, is often regarded by Chinese film critics as one of the most important films in the history of Chinese cinema, in 2005, Hong Kong film awards it as the best 100 years of film. Ironically, it was precisely its artistic quality and apparent lack of "political grounding" that led to its labeling by the CCP as rightist or reactionary, and the film was quickly forgotten by those on the mainland following the CCP's victory in 1949. However, with the China Film Archive's re-opening after the Cultural Revolution, a new print was struck from the original negative, allowing Spring of the Small Town to find a new and admiring audience and to influence an entire new generation of filmmakers. Indeed, an acclaimed remake was made in 2002 by Tian Zhuangzhuang. A Chinese Peking opera film, A Wedding in the Dream (1948), by the same director (Fei Mu), was the first Chinese color film.

== Early People's Republic of China ==
=== Film infrastructure ===
At the founding of the People's Republic of China (PRC) in 1949, there were fewer than 600 movie theaters in the country. The PRC government solved the problem of a lack of film theaters by building mobile projection units which could tour the remote regions of China, ensuring that even the poorest could have access to films. The vast majority of China's people lived in rural areas, and most people in China had not seen a film until mobile projectionists brought them.

Yuan Muzhi was important in developing the government's theories and practices of rural film exhibition. Yuan and Chen Bo'er transformed the post-Second Sino-Japanese War remnants of the Manchurian Motion Picture Association into the Northeast Film Studio and when Yuan became Film Bureau chief in 1949, he applied its model to help institute a film exhibition network around the country. The Northeast Film Studio also trained the first generation of communist Chinese documentary filmmakers. In 1950, 1,800 projectionists from around the country traveled to Nanjing for a training program. These projectionists replicated the training program in their own home provinces to create more projectionists. Nanjing was later termed a "Cradle of People's Cinema."

The PRC sought to recruit women and ethnic minority projectionists in an effort to more effectively reach marginalized communities. Rural mobile projectionist teams and urban movie theaters were generally managed through the PRC's cultural bureaucracy. Mobile projection teams during the Mao era typically included three to four workers who physically transported film infrastructure through a large geographic area mostly not covered by any electrical grid. Trade Unions and PLA propaganda departments also operated film exhibition networks. Work as a mobile projectionist was physically and technically demanding. As a result, women projectionists and all-women mobile projection teams were promoted in Chinese media as examples of advancing gender equality under socialism.

Until the profusion of mobile projectionist teams in the 1950s, most rural people had not seen a film. The number of movie-viewers hence increased sharply, partly bolstered by the fact that film tickets were given out to work units and attendance was compulsory, with admissions rising from 47 million in 1949 to 4.15 billion in 1959. By 1965 there were around 20,393 mobile film units. During the course of the Mao era, the majority of films were shown by such units, with only a minority watched in theaters.

In the 1950s and the 1960s, the CCP built cinemas (among other cultural buildings) in industrial districts on urban peripheries. These structures were influenced by Soviet architecture and were intended to be vivacious but not "palatial."

In 1953, the non-state film industry was nationalized.

=== Film themes and content ===
The government saw motion pictures as an important artform and tool for mass propaganda. The Soviet-led collaborations Victory of the Chinese People (1950) and Liberated China (1951) were among the biggest film events in the PRC's early years. Victory of the Chinese People depicted re-enactments of four of the CCP's major military victories and was filmed using real ammunition with the participation of the People's Liberation Army.

From the founding of the PRC through the 1970s, scientific education films were a major genre. Addressing topics like hygiene, modern production methods, communal organisation, and agricultural methods, these films were intended to advance modernisation while conveying a sense of collective progress.

The private studios in Shanghai, including Kunming, Wenhua, Guotai, and Datong, were at first encouraged to make new films. They made approximately 47 films during the next two years but soon ran into trouble, owing to the furor over the Kunlun-produced drama The Life of Wu Xun (1950), directed by Sun Yu and starring veteran Zhao Dan. In an anonymous article in People's Daily in May 1951, the feature was accused of spreading feudal ideas. After the article was revealed to be penned by Mao Zedong, the film was banned, the Film Steering Committee was formed to "re-educate" the film industry, and the private studios were all incorporated into the state-run Shanghai Film Studio.

After the establishment of the PRC, China's cultural bureaucracy described American films as screen-opium and began criticizing American film alongside anti-drug campaigns. The Chinese Communist Party (CCP) sought to tighten control over mass media, producing instead movies centering on peasants, soldiers, and workers, such as Bridge (1949) and The White-Haired Girl (1950). One of the production bases in the middle of all the transition was the Changchun Film Studio. American films were banned as part of the Korean War effort.

In 1950s China, a common view of film was that it served as "socialist distance horizon education". For example, films promoted rural collectivization. Cinema also sought to develop the proletarian class consciousness of rural workers, encouraging the industrialization and militarization of their labor. Film projection teams operating in rural China were asked to incorporate lantern slides into their work to introduce national policies and political campaigns.

Between 1949 and 1957, China imported more than 1,300 films, two-thirds of them from the Soviet Union.

In the 17 years between the founding of the People's Republic of China and the Cultural Revolution, 603 feature films and 8,342 reels of documentaries and newsreels were produced, sponsored mostly as CCP propaganda by the government, according to the state-run China Internet Information Center. For example, in Guerrilla on the Railroad (铁道游击队), dated 1956, the Chinese Communist Party was depicted as the primary resistance force against the Second Sino-Japanese War. Chinese filmmakers were sent to Moscow to study the Soviet socialist realism style of filmmaking. The Beijing Film Academy was established in 1950 and officially opened in 1956. One important film of this era is This Life of Mine (1950), directed by Shi Hu, which follows an old beggar reflecting on his past life as a policeman working for the various regimes since 1911. The first widescreen Chinese film was produced in 1960. Animated films using a variety of folk arts, such as papercuts, shadow plays, puppetry, and traditional paintings, also were very popular for entertaining and educating children. The most famous of these, the classic Havoc in Heaven (two parts, 1961, 4), was made by Wan Laiming of the Wan Brothers and won the Outstanding Film award at the London International Film Festival.

Films such as The White-Haired Girl and Serf were part of a genre of redemptive melodramas, which sought to encourage audiences to "speak bitterness".

After the United Kingdom and the PRC established diplomatic relations, cultural exchanges between the two countries gradually resumed, including British moves being made available in China.

The thawing of censorship in 1956–57 (known as the Hundred Flowers Campaign) and in the early 1960s led to more indigenous Chinese films being made, which were less reliant on their Soviet counterparts. During this campaign the sharpest criticisms came from the satirical comedies of Lü Ban. Before the New Director Arrives exposes the hierarchical relationships occurring between the cadres, while his next film, The Unfinished Comedy (1957), was labeled as a "poisonous weed" during the Anti-Rightist Movement, and Lü was banned from directing for life. Other noteworthy films produced during this period were adaptations of literary classics, such as Sang Hu's The New Year's Sacrifice (1956, adapted from a Lu Xun story) and Shui Hua's The Lin Family Shop (1959, adapted from a Mao Dun story). The most prominent filmmaker of this era was Xie Jin, whose three films in particular, Woman Basketball Player No. 5 (1957), The Red Detachment of Women (1961), and Two Stage Sisters (1964), exemplify China's increased expertise in filmmaking. Films made during this period are polished, exhibiting high production value and elaborate sets. While Beijing and Shanghai remained the main centers of production, between 1957 and 1960 the government built regional studios in Guangzhou, Xi'an, and Chengdu to encourage representation of ethnic minorities in films. Chinese cinema began to directly address the issue of such ethnic minorities during the late 1950s and early 1960s in films like Five Golden Flowers (1959), Third Sister Liu (1960), Serfs (1963), and Ashima (1964).

On 9 March 1958, the Ministry of Culture held a meeting to introduce a Great Leap Forward in cinema. During the Great Leap Forward, the film industry rapidly expanded, with documentary films being the genre that experienced the greatest growth. Trends in documentary film included "artistic documentaries," in which actors and non-actors reenacted events. Film venues also expanded rapidly, including both urban cinemas and mobile projection units.

As part of the Socialist Education Movement, mobile film projectionist units showed films and slideshows that emphasized class struggle and encouraged audience members to discuss bitter experiences onstage. New films termed "emphasis films" were released to coincide with the campaign, and the film version of The White-Haired Girl was re-released.

In 1965, China launched the Resist America, Aid Vietnam campaign in response to the U.S. bombing of North Vietnam. To promote campaign themes denouncing U.S. imperialism and promoted Vietnamese resistance, the CCP used film exhibitions and other cultural media.

== Films of the Cultural Revolution ==
During the Cultural Revolution, the film industry was severely restricted. Almost all previous films were banned, and only a few new ones were produced, the revolutionary model operas. The most notable of these was a ballet version of the revolutionary opera The Red Detachment of Women, directed by Pan Wenzhan and Fu Jie in 1970.

The release of filmed versions of the revolutionary model operas resulted in a re-organization and expansion of China's film exhibition network. From 1965 to 1976, the number of film projection units in China quadrupled, total film audiences nearly tripled, and the national film attendance rate doubled. The Cultural Revolution Group drastically reduced ticket prices which, in its view, would allow film to better serve the needs of workers and of socialism.

In addition to films deemed laudatory, from the middle of 1966 to 1968, the expanding film distribution network screened films characterized as "poisonous weeds" to hundreds of millions of audience members for the purpose of criticizing the films. These criticism screenings were sometimes accompanied by struggle sessions.

Sent-down youth were a major subset of China's rural projectionists during the Cultural Revolution period.

Feature film production came almost to a standstill in the early years from 1967 to 1972. Movie production revived after 1972 under the strict jurisdiction of the Gang of Four until 1976, when they were overthrown. The few films that were produced during this period, such as 1975's Breaking with Old Ideas, were highly regulated in terms of plot and characterization.

In 1972, Chinese officials invited Michelangelo Antonioni to China to film the achievements of the Cultural Revolution. Antonioni made the documentary Chung Kuo, Cina. When it was released in 1974, CCP leadership in China interpreted the film as reactionary and anti-Chinese. Viewing art through the principles of the Yan'an Talks, particularly the concept that there is no such thing as art-for-art's-sake, party leadership construed Antonioni's aesthetic choices as politically motivated and banned the film. Jiang Qing criticized Premier Zhou Enlai's role in Antonioni's invitation to China as not only a failure but also treasonous. Since its 2004 release in China, the film has been well-regarded by Chinese audiences, especially for its beautiful depictions of a more simple time.

Because China rejection most foreign film importation, comparatively minor cinema like Albanian cinema and North Korean cinema developed mass audiences in China. Through Albanian films screened during this period, many Chinese audience members were introduced to avant-garde and modernist storytelling techniques and aesthetics.

== Post-Cultural Revolution ==
=== Box office boom after the Cultural Revolution ===
In the years immediately following the Cultural Revolution, the film industry again flourished as a medium of popular entertainment. Production rose steadily, from 19 features in 1977 to 125 in 1986. Domestically produced films played to large audiences, and tickets for foreign film festivals sold quickly. The industry tried to revive crowds by making more innovative and "exploratory" films like their counterparts in the West.

Chinese cinema grew significantly in the late 1970s. In 1979, annual box office admissions reached a peak of 29.3 billion tickets sold, equivalent to an average of 30 films per person. Chinese cinema continued to prosper into the early 1980s. In 1980, annual box office admissions stood at 23.4 billion tickets sold, equivalent to an average of 29 films per person. In terms of box office admissions, this period represented the peak ticket sales in the history of the Chinese box office. High ticket sales were driven by low ticket prices, with a cinema ticket typically costing between ¥0.1 ($0.06) and ¥0.3 ($0.19) at the time.

By the early 1980s, there were 162,000 projection units in China, primarily composed of mobile movie teams which showed films outdoors in both rural and urban areas.

A number of films during this period drew box office admissions in the hundreds of millions. China's highest-grossing film in box office admissions was Legend of the White Snake (1980) with an estimated 700 million admissions, followed by In-Laws (Full House of Joy) (1981) and The Undaunted Wudang (1983) with more than 600 million ticket sales each. The highest-grossing foreign film was the Japanese film Kimi yo Fundo no Kawa o Watare (1976), which released in 1978 and sold more than 330 million tickets, followed by the Indian film Caravan (1971) which released in 1979 and sold about 300 million tickets.

In the late 1980s the film industry fell on hard times, faced with the dual problems of competition from other forms of entertainment and concern on the part of the authorities that many of the popular thriller and martial arts films were socially unacceptable. In January 1986 the film industry was transferred from the Ministry of Culture to the newly formed Ministry of Radio, Cinema, and Television to bring it under "stricter control and management" and to "strengthen supervision over production."

=== "Scar dramas" ===
The end of the Cultural Revolution brought the release of "scar dramas" (傷痕剧 shānghén jù), which depicted the emotional traumas left by this period. The best-known of these is probably Xie Jin's Hibiscus Town (1986), although they could be seen as late as the 1990s with Tian Zhuangzhuang's The Blue Kite (1993). In the 1980s, open criticism of certain past CCP policies was encouraged by Deng Xiaoping as a way to reveal the excesses of the Cultural Revolution and the earlier Anti-Rightist Campaign, also helping to legitimize Deng's new policies of "reform and opening up." For instance, the Best Picture prize in the inaugural 1981 Golden Rooster Awards was given to two "scar dramas", Evening Rain (Wu Yonggang, Wu Yigong, 1980) and Legend of Tianyun Mountain (Xie Jin, 1980).

Many scar dramas were made by members of the Fourth Generation whose own careers or lives had suffered during the events in question, while younger, Fifth Generation directors such as Tian tended to focus on less controversial subjects of the immediate present or the distant past. Official enthusiasm for scar dramas waned by the 1990s when younger filmmakers began to confront negative aspects of the Mao era. The Blue Kite, though sharing a similar subject as the earlier scar dramas, was more realistic in style, and was made only through obfuscating its real script. Shown abroad, it was banned from release in mainland China, while Tian himself was banned from making any films for nearly a decade afterward.

== Rise of the fifth generation ==
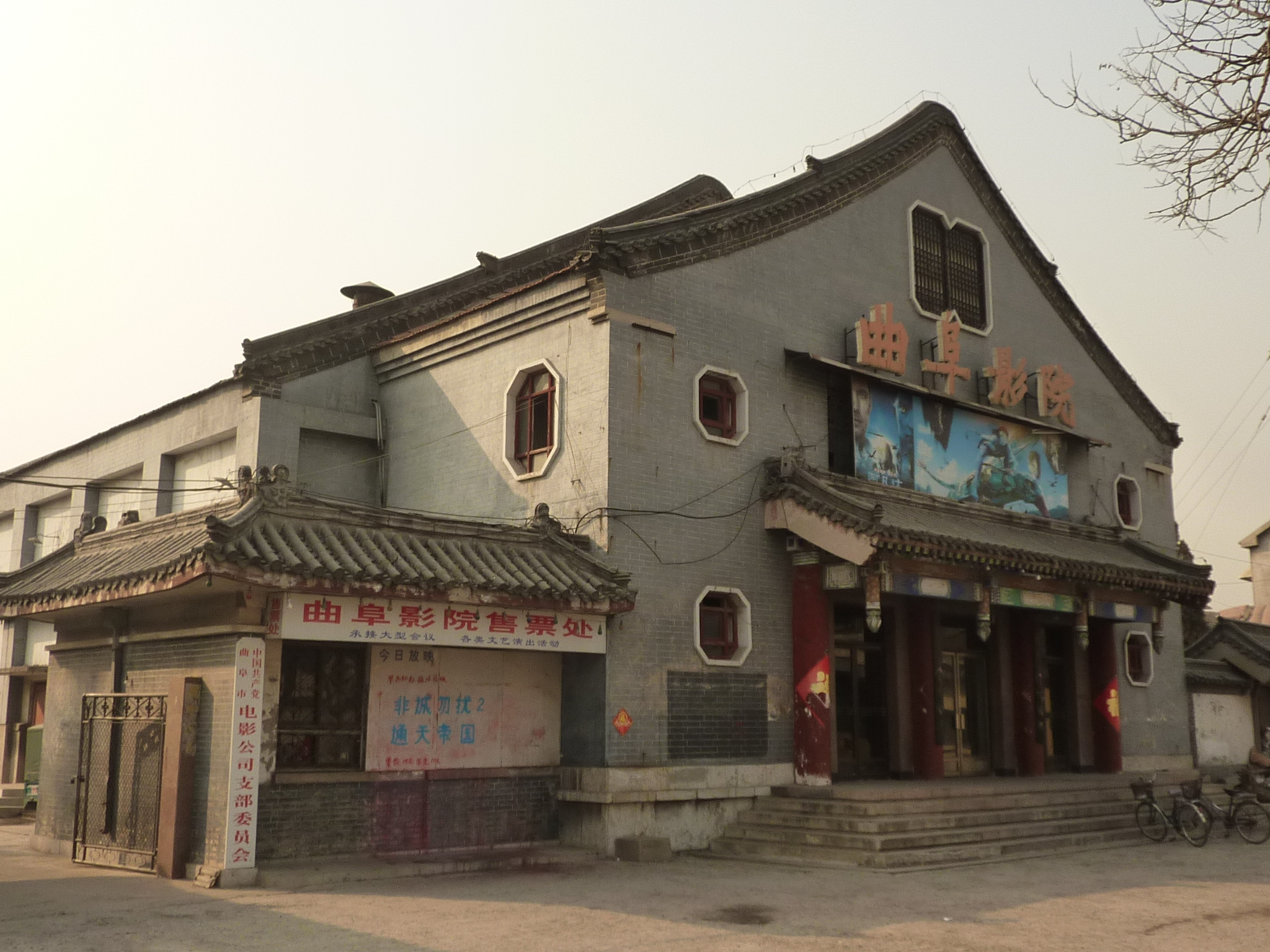
A movie theater in Qufu, Shandong

Beginning in the mid-late 1980s during the New Enlightenment movement in China, the rise of the so-called fifth generation of Chinese filmmakers brought increased popularity of Chinese cinema abroad. Most of the filmmakers who made up the Fifth Generation had graduated from the Beijing Film Academy in 1982 and included Zhang Yimou, Tian Zhuangzhuang, Chen Kaige, Zhang Junzhao, Li Shaohong, Wu Ziniu and others. These graduates constituted the first group of filmmakers to graduate since the Cultural Revolution and they soon jettisoned traditional methods of storytelling and opted for a more free and unorthodox symbolic approach. After the so-called scar literature in fiction had paved the way for frank discussion, Zhang Junzhao's One and Eight (1983) and Chen Kaige's Yellow Earth (1984) in particular were taken to mark the beginnings of the Fifth Generation. (Note: Notably Zhang Yimou served as cinematographer for both films.) Yellow Earth became one of the first Chinese art films to attract international attention.

The most famous of the Fifth Generation directors, Chen Kaige and Zhang Yimou, went on to produce celebrated works such as King of the Children (1987), Ju Dou (1989), Raise the Red Lantern (1991) and Farewell My Concubine (1993), which were not only acclaimed by Chinese cinema-goers but by the Western arthouse audience. Tian Zhuangzhuang's films, though less well known by Western viewers, were well noted by directors such as Martin Scorsese. It was during this period that Chinese cinema began reaping the rewards of international attention, including the 1988 Golden Bear for Red Sorghum, the 1992 Golden Lion for The Story of Qiu Ju, the 1993 Palme d'Or for Farewell My Concubine, and three Best Foreign Language Film nominations from the Academy Awards. All these award-winning films starred actress Gong Li, who became the Fifth Generation's most recognizable star, especially to international audiences.

Diverse in style and subject, the Fifth Generation directors' films ranged from black comedy (Huang Jianxin's The Black Cannon Incident, 1985) to the esoteric (Chen Kaige's Life on a String, 1991), but they share a common rejection of the socialist-realist tradition worked by earlier Chinese filmmakers in the Communist era. Other notable Fifth Generation directors include Wu Ziniu, Hu Mei, Li Shaohong and Zhou Xiaowen. Fifth Generation filmmakers reacted against the ideological purity of Cultural Revolution cinema. By relocating to regional studios, they began to explore the actuality of local culture in a somewhat documentarian fashion. Instead of stories depicting heroic military struggles, the films were built out of the drama of ordinary people's daily lives. They also retained political edge, but aimed at exploring issues rather than recycling approved policy. While Cultural Revolution films used character, the younger directors favored psychological depth along the lines of European cinema. They adopted complex plots, ambiguous symbolism, and evocative imagery. Some of their bolder works with political overtones were banned by Chinese authorities.

These films came with a creative genres of stories, new style of shooting as well, directors utilized extensive color and long shots to present and explore history and structure of national culture. As a result of the new films being so intricate, the films were for more educated audiences than anything. The new style was profitable for some and helped filmmakers to make strides in the business. It allowed directors to get away from reality and show their artistic sense.

The Fourth Generation also returned to prominence. Given their label after the rise of the Fifth Generation, these were directors whose careers were stalled by the Cultural Revolution and who were professionally trained prior to 1966. Wu Tianming, in particular, made outstanding contributions by helping to finance major Fifth Generation directors under the auspices of the Xi'an Film Studio (which he took over in 1983), while continuing to make films like Old Well (1986) and The King of Masks (1996).

The Fifth Generation movement ended in part after the 1989 Tiananmen Square protests and massacre, although its major directors continued to produce notable works. Several of its filmmakers went into self-imposed exile: Wu Tianming moved to the United States (but later returned), Huang Jianxin left for Australia, while many others went into television-related works.

In the late 1980s, a more commercialized and entertainment-focused cinema developed, influenced by the restructuring of state-owned film studios. Red Sorghum is often considered as the most prominent example of a transitional film between the modernist style of the Fifth Generation and the more commercial approach that developed.
