= 800 Heroes (disambiguation) =

800 Heroes, or Eight-hundred Heroes, may refer to:

- The Defense of Sihang Warehouse, a 1937 constituent battle of the Battle of Shanghai
- "800 Heroes Song", a patriotic Chinese song about the defense of Shihang Warehouse
- 800 Heroes (film), a 1938 Chinese film about the Defense of Shihang Warehouse
- 800 Heroes, a 1976 Hong Kong film about the Defense of Shihang Warehouse
- Eight Hundred Heroes, a 1977 Taiwanese film about the Defense of Shihang Warehouse
- The Eight Hundred, a 2020 Chinese film about the Defence of Shihang Warehouse

== See also ==
- 1-800-HERO, a 1998 novel by JoAnn Ross
