= Emperor's Dream =

Chinese animated puppet film

- Directed by: Boer Chen
- Produced by: Boer Chen
- Release date: 1947
- Country: China

Emperor's Dream (Chinese: 皇帝梦) is a Chinese puppet film produced by the Northeast Film company in China.

== Background ==
On October 1, 1946, the Northeast Film Studio was merged with the Yan'an Film Studio (延安电影制片厂). The film is known to be produced in 1947 when the northeast company was being disintegrated from the Japanese company Manchukuo Film Association. The new studio would later be renamed to Changchun Film Studio. In the midst of all the changes, Emperor's Dream is considered the first puppet film made after the declaration of the People's Republic of China.

== Story ==
The story is about exposing and satirizing the corruption of the Kuomintang party using puppets in an exaggerated fashion.
