= Lianhua Symphony =

1937 film by Fei Mu

- Directed by: Cai Chusheng; Fei Mu; He Mengfu; Situ Huimin; Shen Fu; Sun Yu; Tan Youliu; Zhu Shilin
- Written by: Cai Chusheng; Fei Mu; He Mengfu; Situ Huimin; Shen Fu; Sun Yu; Tan Youliu; Zhu Shilin
- Starring: Li Lili; Chen Yen-yen; Jiang Qing
- Cinematography: Zhou Daming; Huang Shaofen; Chen Yongshi
- Music by: Miao Zhenyu; Sha Mei
- Production company: United Photoplay Service
- Release date: 17 December 1937 (China)
- Running time: 102 minutes
- Country: China
- Language: Mandarin

Lianhua Symphony (simplified Chinese: 联华交响曲; traditional Chinese: 聯華交響曲; pinyin: Lián huá jiāoxiǎng qǔ; also known as Symphony of Lianhua) is a 1937 Chinese anthology comedy drama film. Produced by the United Photoplay Service, it served as a showcase of the studio's possibilities. It consists of eight segments of various duration and genre, directed by eight prominent directors of the era: Cai Chusheng, Fei Mu, He Mengfu, Situ Huimin, Shen Fu, Sun Yu, Tan Youliu, and Zhu Shilin.

== Production overview ==
Lianhua Film Company was the biggest film company of China in the 1930s. Eight young directors chosen to participate in the project were already praised for their previous works. Most of them became even more important several years later and today their films are considered classics. Some, like Sun Yu's The Big Road (1934), Cai Chusheng's The Spring River Flows East (1947), Fei Mu's Spring in a Small Town (1948), or Shen Fu's Myriad of Lights (1949) often reappear on many "best Chinese films of all time" lists. Zhu Shilin became a prominent figure in Hong Kong cinema of the 1950s. In this respect, today Lianhua Symphony can be considered an overview of short films created by the most important directors of the so-called "first generation" of Chinese filmmakers.

Lianhua Symphony episodes differ in content and style. The main themes are poverty, social patriotism, friendship. Many segments refer, either directly or indirectly, to Japanese threat of the time. Some may be classified as melodramas and some as comedies, including elements of slapstick. Fei Mu's segment about women having bad dreams, Nightmares in Spring Chamber, is clearly and heavily influenced by German Expressionist cinema.

The film begins with a short introduction sequence, in which Lianhua Film Company personnel sings "Song of Big Road", a hit from one of the studio's previous films, The Big Road (1934). The camera zooms out to reveal a microphone, film equipment and a conductor. The film finishes with a similar scene, presenting a different song, "The Pioneers". This reminds us, that Lianhua was not only a prolific manufacturer of movies, but also - music.

== Segments ==
No.	English Title	Chinese Title (Traditional)	Chinese Title (Simplified)	Director	Cast
1	Two Yuans	兩毛錢	两毛钱	Situ Huimin	Jiang Qing (as Lan Ping), Mei Xi, Shen Fu
2	Nightmares in Spring Chamber	春閨斷夢	春闺断梦	Fei Mu	Chen Yen-yen, Lai Cheuk-Cheuk
3	The Stranger	陌生人	陌生人	Tan Youliu	Liu Qiong, Bai Lu, Zheng Junli
4	Three Friends	三人行	三人行	Shen Fu	Liu Jiqun, Yin Xiucen, Han Langen
5	Landscape Under the Moonlight	月下小景	月下小景	He Mengfu	Li Qing
6	The Ghost	鬼	鬼	Zhu Shilin	Li Lili
7	Rhapsody of a Madman	瘋人狂想曲	疯人狂想曲	Sun Yu	Shang Guanwu, Mei Xi
8	Five Little Brothers	小五義	小五义	Cai Chusheng	Wang Cilong, Yin Xiucen
