= Yang Huimin =

Chinese Girl Guide and Scouting pioneer

Yang Xixian
- 楊希賢
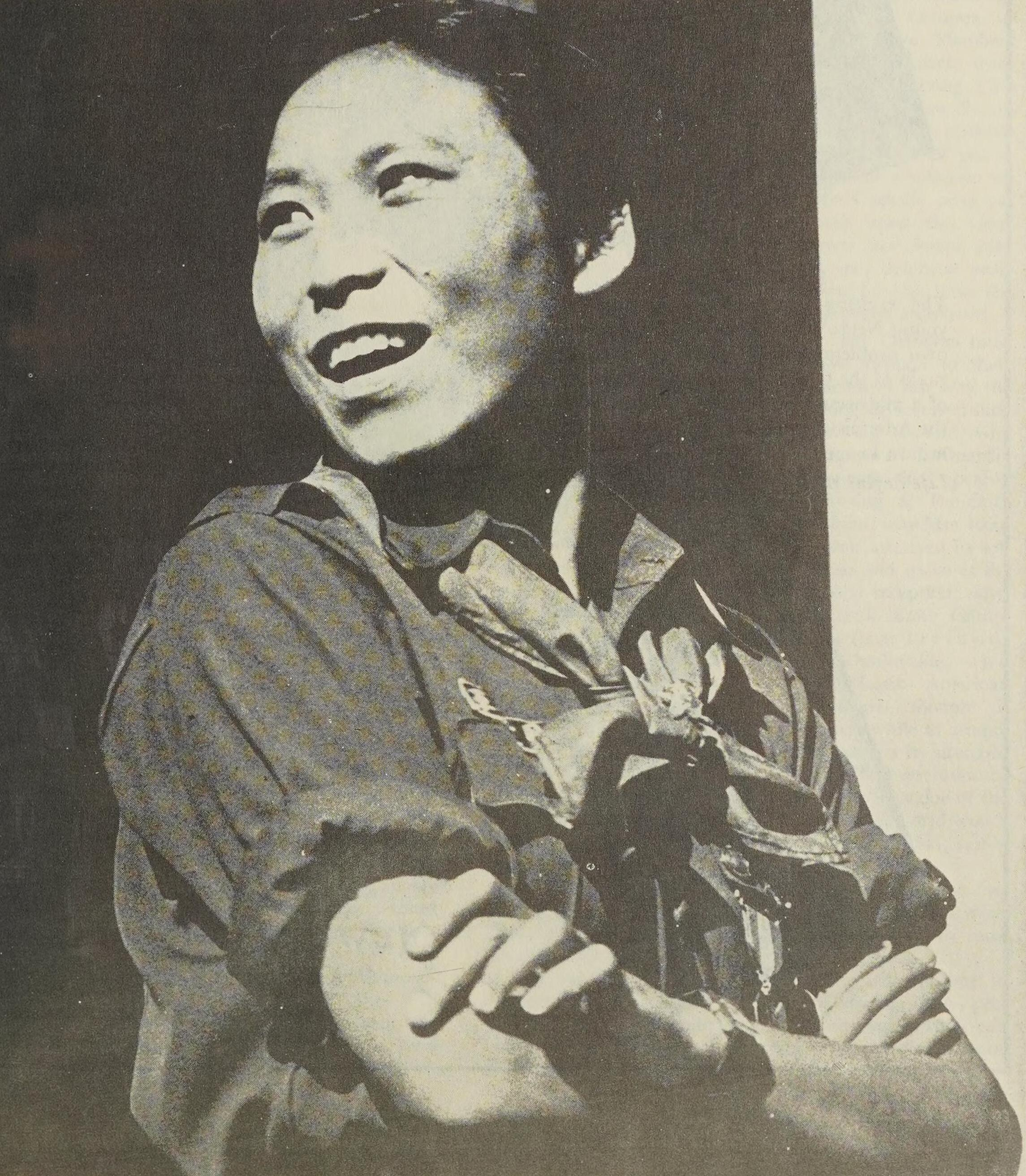
- Yang c. 1938
- Born: Yang Huimin (楊惠敏); March 6, 1915; Zhenjiang, Jiangsu, China
- Died: March 9, 1992 (aged 77); Taipei Veterans General Hospital, Beitou District, Taipei, Taiwan
- Resting place: Yangmingshan No. 1 Cemetery, Beitou District, Taipei, Taiwan
- Occupations: Physical education teacher and Girl Guide
- Known for: Inspiring Chinese soldiers defending the Sihang Warehouse
- Spouse: Zhu Chongming (died 1971)
- Children: 2

Yang Xixian (traditional Chinese: 楊希賢; simplified Chinese: 杨希贤; pinyin: Yáng Xīxián), formerly known as Yang Huimin (traditional Chinese: 楊惠敏; simplified Chinese: 杨惠敏; pinyin: Yáng Huìmǐn; March 6, 1915 – March 9, 1992) was a Girl Guide in the 1937 Battle of Shanghai during World War II who supplied a Republic of China flag and brought supplies to besieged defenders of the Sihang Warehouse. Her actions proved inspiring to the defenders, who flew the flag the next daybreak in front of thousands of watching eyes across the bank of the Suzhou Creek.

== Early life and education ==
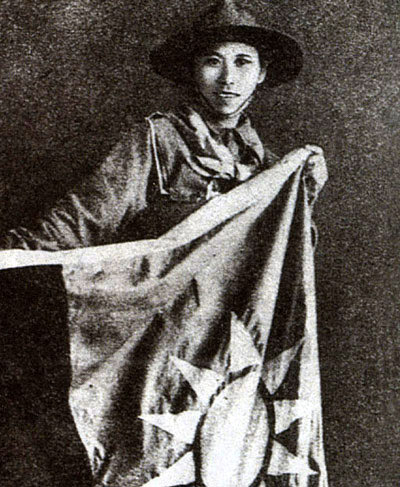
Yang with the flag that she brought to the defenders of the Sihang Warehouse in 1937

In Summer 1937, Yang joined the Shanghai Girl Scouts.

On 26 October, during the Battle of Shanghai against the invading Japanese forces, the Nationalist Army retreated and Japanese forces occupied the city. A Nationalist regiment remained in defense of Sihang Warehouse to cover the withdrawal of the other soldiers. The people of Shanghai provided these soldiers with moral support and material assistance.

Yang became famous for delivering the national flag of the Republic of China to these soldiers, at great risk to herself. Several different variations of the story were reported, with variations including on when she presented the flag to the soldiers and when it was raised. According to Yang:

I took off the outer jacket and placed the national flag soaked with my sweat in front of them. These nation-defending heroes were moved to tears ... In the morning light, about ten to twenty scattered on the rooftop all raised hands in earnest salute to the national flag. No music, no ceremony but the sacred, sombre atmosphere at that simple but solemn space was deeply touching. I will never forget it for the rest of my life.

Yang's photo was widely publicised and Reuters' depiction of the heroism of the soldiers and of Yang made them national symbols. The Japanese forces placed a bounty on Yang and she fled Shanghai to continue resistance work from the Nationalist interior of China.

Yang received honours from Chiang Kai-shek and Song Meiling. In August 1938, Yang represented China at the World Peace Conference in the United States. She made speeches and did fundraising. Yang also traveled to Europe and India.

Yang Huimin had the opportunity to study in the United States at that time, but she was unable to do so due to the outbreak of the Pacific War. Later, she joined an underground organization in Hong Kong. During the Japanese occupation of Hong Kong in 1942, Yang Huimin was responsible for engaging well-known people such as Mei Lanfang and Hu Die to evacuate from Hong Kong to mainland China.

In 1942, the Nationalist government arrested Yang, alleging that she had conspired with the enemy. Few years later in January 1946, the Ministry of Defence acquitted her.

== Career ==
After the Chinese Civil War in 1949, Yang followed the Chiang Kai-shek government to Taiwan. On Taiwan, Yang spent years not talking about her wartime experience. She did not want to be recognized and worked as a physical education teacher in Taipei under the new name Yang Xixian. She married the widowed National Taiwan University Professor of Physical Education, Zhu Chongming (朱重明) and had two sons, Zhu Fugui (朱復圭) and Zhu Fuhong (朱復轟). The sons were not aware of their mother's war effort when they studied her role in grade school lessons.

In addition, she has also actively participated in and promoted Scout activities and National Women's League of the Republic of China movement for many years.

On June 16, 1969, her husband Zhu Chongming retired at the age of 84. On March 21, 1971, he died and was buried in Yangmingshan No. 1 Cemetery.

On October 28, 1977, Yang was involved in a car accident in Taipei. Although she survived, her left part of her body had paralyzed and she had difficulty eating.

In February 1980, she was hospitalized for treatment due to stroke. Her medical and hospitalization expenses were fully subsidized by the Taipei City Government Department of Social Welfare.

Yang died of illness on March 9, 1992 at Taipei Veterans General Hospital at age of 78. Her funeral was held on April 21, 1992, with President of the Republic of China Lee Teng-hui and other politicians in attendance. Actress Brigitte Lin, who portrayed Yang in the 1976 Eight Hundred Heroes, also came to pay tribute. The director of the China Youth Corps, the chairperson of the National Women's League of the Republic of China, the representative of National Girl Scouts Association of the Republic of China and a member of the Legislative Yuan covered Yang's coffin with the Taiwanese national flag.

Yang is buried at the Yangmingshan No. 1 Cemetery in Beitou District, Taipei, Taiwan.

== In popular culture ==
Depictions of Yang Huimin in cinema

Along with the defenders of Sihang warehouse, the "800", Yang is depicted in various films.

- She is portrayed by Chen Bo'er in the 1938 film 800 Heroes, the first portrayal of her in film.
- Her involvement in the Sihang Warehouse defense is depicted in the 1976 Taiwanese film Eight Hundred Heroes with Brigitte Lin playing her role. Yang objected to some of the ways in which the film exaggerated her action for dramatic effect.
- In the 2007 film Nanking, the Banner Girl based on her is portrayed by Leah Liang.
- In 2020, Yang is portrayed by Tang Yixin in the Chinese historical war drama The Eight Hundred, which became the second highest-grossing film of 2020.
