= Scenes of City Life =

1935 film by Yuan Muzhi

Scenes of City Life (Original English Title as Quo Vadis)
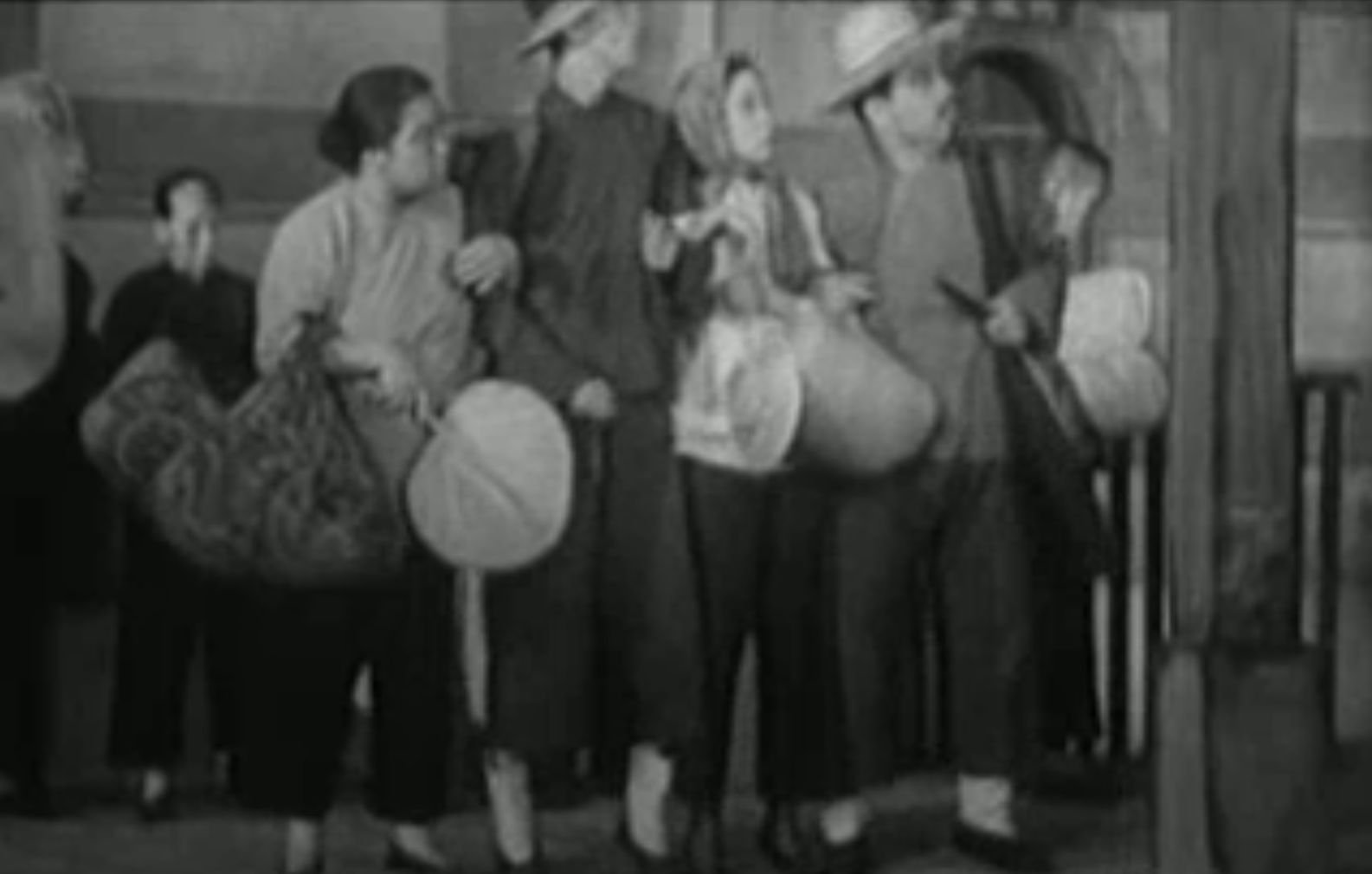
- Traditional Chinese: 都市風光
- Simplified Chinese: 都市风光
- Literal meaning: metropolitan scenes
- Hanyu Pinyin: dūshì fēngguāng
- Wade–Giles: tu-shi feng-kuang
- Directed by: Yuan Muzhi
- Written by: Yuan Muzhi
- Produced by: Ma Dejian
- Starring: Bai Lu; Lan Ping; Tang Na
- Cinematography: Wu Yinxian
- Edited by: Chen Xiangxing
- Music by: He Luting
- Production company: Diantong Film Company
- Release date: 1935
- Running time: 103 minutes
- Country: China
- Language: Mandarin

Scenes of City Life is a 1935 Chinese comedy-drama film directed by Yuan Muzhi. The original English translation of the film was Quo Vadis. It is noted for being the first film directed by Yuan, as well as the first film appearance of Jiang Qing (or Lan Ping, as she then called herself), who later became Mao Zedong's fourth wife. This film belongs to the type of film in which many members of music related professionals were prominent, these were works where music is a key aspect of framing within the film.

== Plot ==
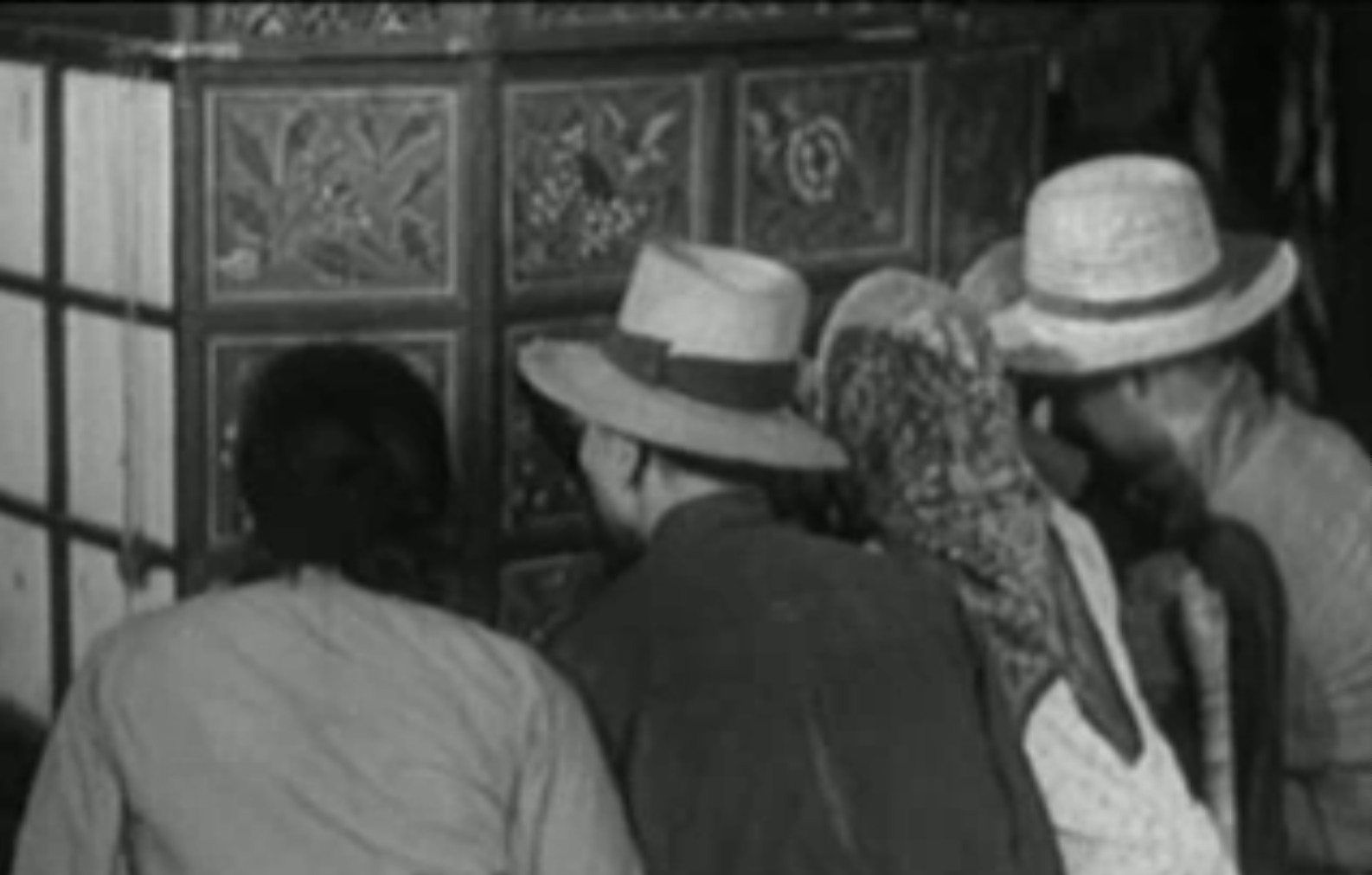
Family looking into the peep show

At a rural country station, Li Menghua, his sister Zhang Xiaoyun, and their parents pay to look through a Western peep-show box, which projects a dazzling montage of Shanghai's neon lights, automobiles, and fashionable crowds. Enthralled, the family imagines themselves living within this vibrant metropolis. Menghua lands a job at a local newspaper and harbors unspoken love for Xiaoyun, who becomes infatuated with Wang Junshan, an affluent tea merchant. Xiaoyun's desire for luxury leads her to pawn family heirlooms and coax Wang's assistant into buying her an expensive dress. Meanwhile, Menghua—determined to prove his devotion—sells a love letter to fund a dance invitation, only to witness Xiaoyun leave with Wang.

Pressure mounts on Xiaoyun's family as debts accumulate. Wang, coerced into marriage by Xiaoyun's parents, faces his own creditors and abandons his new bride after financial schemes collapse. His secretary elopes with Ahxiang, the family maid, leaving further chaos. Devastated by Xiaoyun's rejection, Menghua attempts suicide but survives. In the film's final scene, the narrative returns to the train station: Xiaoyun and her father miss their train, and the rural family hesitates between departing locomotives—symbolizing the elusive promise of urban life. The films ending features all the main characters pulling apart in different directions, unsure of where to go, until the shot spirals into an animated question mark.

== Cast ==
- Bai Lu as the Maidservant
- Lan Ping (Jiang Qing) as the Girlfriend
- Tang Na as Li Menghua
- Wu Yin as Zhang Xiaoyun's Mother
- Zhou Boxun as Zhang Xiaoyun's Father
- Zhang Xinzhu as Zhang Xiaoyun
- He Menghe as Wang Junsan
- Cai Ruohong as Wang Junsan's Secretary
- Yuan Muzhi as the Peep Show Operator
- Feng Sizhi as the Accountant
- Fan Bozi as the Station Master
- Zhang Huitong as the Comprador
- Lin Huishu as the landlady
- Li Yifei as a Shop clerk

== Production ==
Regarded as the first musical comedy in the history of Chinese cinema, Scenes of City Life was the first Chinese film with its own music that were specifically written for the film through a three-way cooperation of three eminent composers: Yuanren Zhao, Zi Huang and Lüting He.

- The film studio Diantong was originally a sound equipment company established in 1933 by 3 electrical engineers: Ma Dejian, Situ Huimin, and Gong Yuke. Together, they invented one of the earliest sound-on-film recording systems in China: the Sanyou-style recording system (Sanyoushi luyingji). This system is later used in films such as The Big Road (1934), Song of the Fishermen (1934), and Scenes of City Life.
- In 1934, Diantong changed into a film studio, competing with other studios such as Mingxing and Lianhua. The studio attracted relatively young artists who were particularly active in spoken drama. The Director Yuan Muzhi wrote the story of Scenes of City Life in 1934 as a literary piece. After less than 2 years, the studio was forced to shut down for economic and political reasons.

Despite its comedic and musical elements, the film presents a satire on the socio-economic conditions of Shanghai in the 1930s. It demonstrates leftist agenda through the struggles in a rapidly modernizing urban environment and subtly hinting collective action as the solution. The real locations showing the crowded streets of Shanghai as well as scenes depicting the impact of financial crisis and the living conditions of the lower class serve to reinforce the conflict between the social classes in the period.

Chinese film makers in the 1930s, including the cast of Scenes of City Life, faced severe financial difficulties, struggled with low wages and unstable employment. Many filmmakers lived in cramped quarters like tingzijian. Although these environments were unpleasant and ill to live in, it did aid in fostering a creative and collaborative atmosphere which influenced their cinematic techniques: strong sensitivity to space and acoustic. Despite production challenges, Scenes of City Life marked an early use of synchronized sound and montage in Chinese filmmaking.

== Reception ==
Scholars now recognize the film as a vital early Chinese sound cinema production which successfully bridged the cultural and technological shift from silent to sound films. Weihong Bao explains that the film demonstrates the leftist modernist movement of the 1930s which attempted to differentiate Chinese cinema from traditional theater and American talkies by using non-synchronized sound and visual experimentation.

Scenes of City Life as one of Yuan Muzhi's films, worked as propaganda for the communist party. Jubin Hu stated that Yuan Muzhi was a member of the left activist movement in the China Film Culture Society. This group was politically motivated and attempted to mobilize the Chinese film world against the KMT. Yuan Muzhi’s films depict class struggle and persuaded many other filmmakers to produce left wing films.

According to Christopher Berry and Mary Ann Farquhar, Scenes of City Life demonstrates how early Chinese cinema operated within the framework of cultural nationalism. The filmmakers used this work to build a contemporary Chinese identity because of the domestic social transformations and foreign imperialist threats. During this period cinema served dual purposes by entertaining audiences while expressing national identity and mediating the effects of modernization.

== Style and Technique ==
Costume

In the movie, most of the female characters are dressed in cheongsams, a classic garment that has been given a whole new meaning of the times by the designers. The cheongsam, designed to follow the contours of the body, emphasized modern urban femininity, are paired with short hairstyles and high-heeled shoes, elements associated with the emerging image of the independent, cosmopolitan woman. Short hair departed from traditional styles associated with femininity, while high heels contributed to the characters' modern appearance.

Sound Effect

City Scenes was one of the first Chinese films to feature music that was written expressly for films. The film seems to have drawn inspiration from Chaplin’s City Lights (shown in Shanghai in 1931 and 1932) and other film sources. However, unlike American musicals, the film did not include song-and-dance sequences; rather, it was closer to a ciné-opéra - a French variation of light opera. Critic Zheng Boqi (under his pen name Xi Naifang) describes cine-opéra as a new musical genre derived from such a tradition yet distinct, adding characteristics of a revue while taking full advantage of sound for a new form of cinema.

He Luting, the famous music composer of the 1930s, participated in overseeing and writing the music scores. In addition to He Luting, other reputable composers including Huang Zi, Zhao Yuenren, and Lii Ji, wrote music for the film. Huang composed Fantasia or "City Scenes", a symphony heard over the kaleidoscopic montage sequence. The theme song “Song of the Peep Show” (Xiyanqing ge) was written by Zhao Yuenren and Sun Shiyi. It is used to open and close the peep show, setting out the ambiguous boundary between reality and fantasy.

Early discussions of the film were often focused on its use of “mickey-mousing”, a technique where sound effects mimic on-screen actions which create a comic effect similar to early Mickey Mouse cartoons. However, this attention may have overshadowed more sophisticated aspects of the soundtrack, such as its complex use of percussive montage and the blending of diegetic and non-diegetic sound. Specifically, it is percussive music intertwined in montage sequences, proving the touch of Western musicology in 1930s films. Yuan Muzhi and He Luting synchronized each musical beat with the corresponding action, highlighting the humour of the performance and animating the action at the same time. The musicologist Ling Zhang breaks down the dimensions of sound use in the film into four aspects; the blurring of diegetic and non-diegetic sounds, finding “noise musicality” among the sounds made by the working class, rendering of the city noises, and the sounds made by the materialist dreaming. For example, in the beginning of the film there is music heard that is non-diegetic, and it is assumed that it is part of the soundtrack of the film. The camera then pans to show musicians playing the music, bringing it into being a diegetic sound and part of the soundscape within the scene.

The film utilizes a “noise-musicality”, where everyday noises and speech patterns are transformed into rhythmic and musical elements. This technique reflects the character’s absurdity and pokes fun at societal norms. Lastly the theme song, “City Scenes Fantasia '', merges traditional Chinese melodies with Western influences and reflects Shanghai’s cosmopolitan nature and serves as a primary example of city symphony film sequence in early Chinese cinema.
