= Diantong =

Chinese film production company

Diantong Film Company/Denton Film Company 電通影片公司
- Industry: Film
- Founded: 1934
- Defunct: 1935
- Headquarters: Shanghai, China
- Key people: Situ Huimin
- Products: Films

Diantong Film Company or spells as Denton Film Company (Chinese: 電通影片公司) was a short-lived but important Chinese film studio and production company during the 1930s in Shanghai, China. Though it produced only four films during its existence between 1934–1935, all four films became important examples of the left-leaning Chinese cinema of the 1930s. Of all the film studios of the period, Diantong had the closest connection to the Chinese Communist Party.

== History ==
Diantong's origins were originally in a sound-equipment company founded in 1933 by four American-educated engineers to take advantage of the gradual shift from silent films to "talkies". As a developer of sound-recorders, Diantong was pivotal in bringing to Chinese audiences some of the earliest Chinese sound-films, including the Lianhua Film Company-produced Song of the Fishermen (dir. Cai Chusheng). With these successes and with the help of one of the founder's cousins, Situ Huimin, a major leftist filmmaker and intellectual, the equipment company was reformed as its own independent film studio in 1934. From the beginning, Diantong was marked by youth, with its films directed by first-time filmmakers and starring novice actors and actresses (including Yuan Muzhi, Chen Bo'er, Ying Yunwei, and others). This was in part due to Diantong being forced to recruit from local theater organizations rather than from more-established film-makers and crew, who feared associating with such a progressive organization - a similar leftist studio, the Yihua Film Company had only recently had its offices and equipment vandalized and destroyed by Nationalist government agents. Additionally, Diantong drew from Situ's ties to the Communist Party, bringing in screenwriters and party-members such as Tian Han and Xia Yan.

In a short period of time, the company produced four classics of the period: Plunder of Peach and Plum (dir. Ying Yunwei), Children of Troubled Times (dir. Xu Xingzhi), Cityscape (dir. Yuan Muzhi), and Spirit of Freedom (dir. Situ Huimin) (also known as The Goddess of Freedom).

Despite these successes, by 1935, Diantong was suffering not only from Kuomintang pressure due to its political slant (so-called "White terrorism"), but also from financial woes. As a result, in the winter of 1935, Diantong closed its doors permanently. The remains of the company were soon incorporated into Zhang Shankun's newly formed Xinhua Film Company. Meanwhile, many of Diantong's top talent, including Ying Yunwei and Yuan Muzhi, were recruited in Mingxing Film Company's newly formed Studio 2, focused on left-wing cinema. There, they made some of the more important films of the movement, notably Yuan's Street Angel.

== Productions ==
Year	English Title	Chinese Title	Director	Cast
1934	Plunder of Peach and Plum	桃李劫	Ying Yunwei	Yuan Muzhi, Chen Bo'er
1935	Children of Troubled Times	風雲兒女	Xu Xingzhi	Yuan Muzhi, Wang Renmei
1935	Spirit of Freedom	自由神	Situ Huimin	
1935	Scenes of City Life	都市風光	Yuan Muzhi	Bai Lu, Jiang Qing
