= Ying Yunwei =

Chinese director and writer

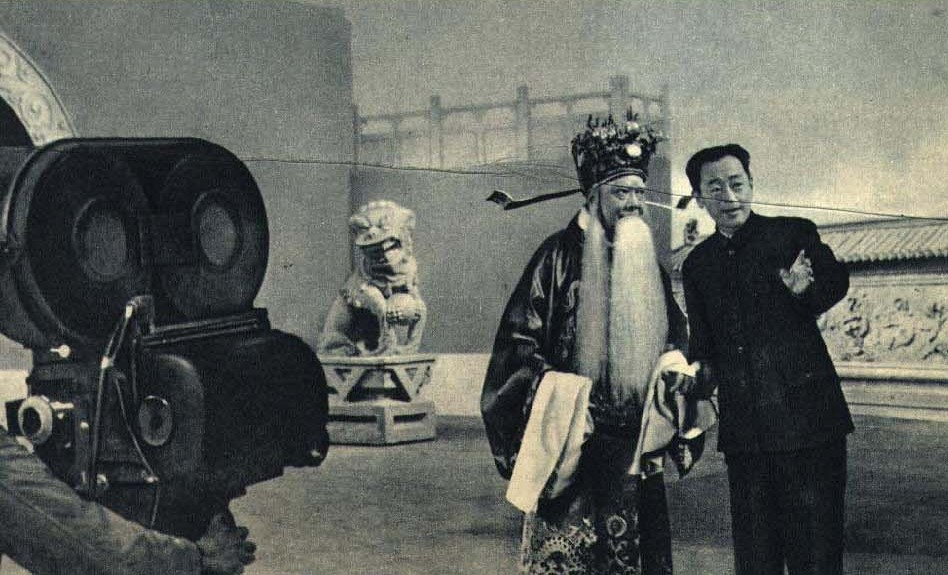
- Born: September 7, 1904; Shanghai, Qing dynasty
- Died: January 17, 1967 (aged 62); Shanghai, China
- Occupations: Film director, theatre director, writer

Chinese name
- Traditional Chinese: 應雲衛
- Simplified Chinese: 应云卫
Transcriptions
Standard Mandarin
- Hanyu Pinyin: Yìng Yúnwèi

Ying Yunwei (7 September 1904 – 17 January 1967) born in Shanghai, was a Chinese director and writer.

== Early life ==
Ying Yunwei at the age of 16 was a poor student growing up. He would spend time with an apprenticeship in foreign trade. He was a pioneer of spoken drama and had a successful career in the shipping industry of Shanghai. A confidential police report stated that Ying's power was linked to his close personal relationship with Du Yuesheng and Huang Jinrong, two of Shanghai's powerful mafia bosses. His apprenticeship in foreign trade however would last up until 1934 where he would promptly resign. In 1921 Ying had participated in an organization known as the Shanghai Drama Association and In August 1930 the China Left-wing Drama Alliance. Ying, during his time in the alliance, participated in the left-wing drama film movement in Shanghai.

== Career ==
Ying Yunwei's film career began in the mid 1930s. During this time he worked for Yuhua and Diantong. A tabloid journalist revealed that Yihua refused to raise his salary, this resulted in Ying's departure and arrival in Mingxing. In 1934, Shanghai Film Studios reestablished itself within a new left-wing film company known as Diantong. Ying would be listed under the director lineup with his film, Plunder of Peach and Plum (also known as Fate of Graduates, 1934). Later in 1934 after his departure from foreign trade Ying would organize the Shanghai Amateur Drama Association and in 1936 work as the executive director of Mingxing's Studio II. When Ying was asked about why he joined Mingxing, Ying stated he was a friend of Zheng Zhengqiu and had already been invited nearly a decade earlier.

In his 1938 film, The Eight Hundred Heroes, it is noted that the film was created during the time of the Battle of Shanghai and that Ying directed it as a way to boost national morale in the face of Japanese aggression. His earlier 1934 film, Plunder of Peach and Plum, was China's first complete talkie with a film soundtrack.

== Death ==
On January 16, 1967, Ying Yunwei was crushed to death during a rebellion within two factions of the Film Bureau. He died at age 62.

== Filmography ==
Year	English title	Chinese title	Notes
1934	Plunder of Peach and Plum	桃李劫	Also co-writer
1935	A Hero of Our Time	時勢英雄	
1936	Revolutionaries	生死同心	
1938	800 Heroes	八百壯士	
1940	Storm on the Border	塞上風雲	
1947	Cherish the Memory of Jiangnan	憶江南	Co-director
1947	The Anonymous	無名氏	
1948	Smooth Sailing	一帆風順	
1948	The Dawning	雞鳴早看天	
1949	Awakening	喜迎春	
1951	Phoenix Reborn	再生鳳凰	
1951	The Annals of Women	婦女春秋	Co-director
1954	Can't Follow Along That Path	不能走那條路	
1956	Song Shijie	宋士傑	Co-director, Peking opera film
1959	Chasing the Fish	追魚	Yue opera film
1960	The Poetry-Contest Pavilion	斗诗亭	Yue opera film
1961	The Stage Art of Zhou Xinfang	周信芳的舞台艺术	2 Peking opera acts starring Zhou Xinfang
1963	Wu Song	武松	Co-director, Peking opera film
