= 800 Heroes (film) =

- Traditional Chinese: 八百壯士
- Simplified Chinese: 八百壮士
- Hanyu Pinyin: Bā bǎi zhuàng shì
- Directed by: Ying Yunwei
- Written by: Yang Hansheng
- Starring: Yuan Muzhi; Chen Bo'er; Hong Hong; Zhang Shufan
- Cinematography: Wang Shizhen
- Production company: Zhongnan Guangrong Film Company
- Distributed by: China Film Production Factory
- Release date: 2 April 1938 (China)
- Running time: 53 minutes
- Country: China
- Language: Mandarin

800 Heroes (Chinese: 八百壯士) is a 1938 Chinese historical war drama film directed by Ying Yunwei and written by Yang Hansheng. The film stars Yuan Muzhi, Chen Bo'er, Hong Hong, and Zhang Shufan. The film is about the Defense of Sihang Warehouse in 1937 Shanghai. The film was released on April 2, 1938, in China.

== Plot ==
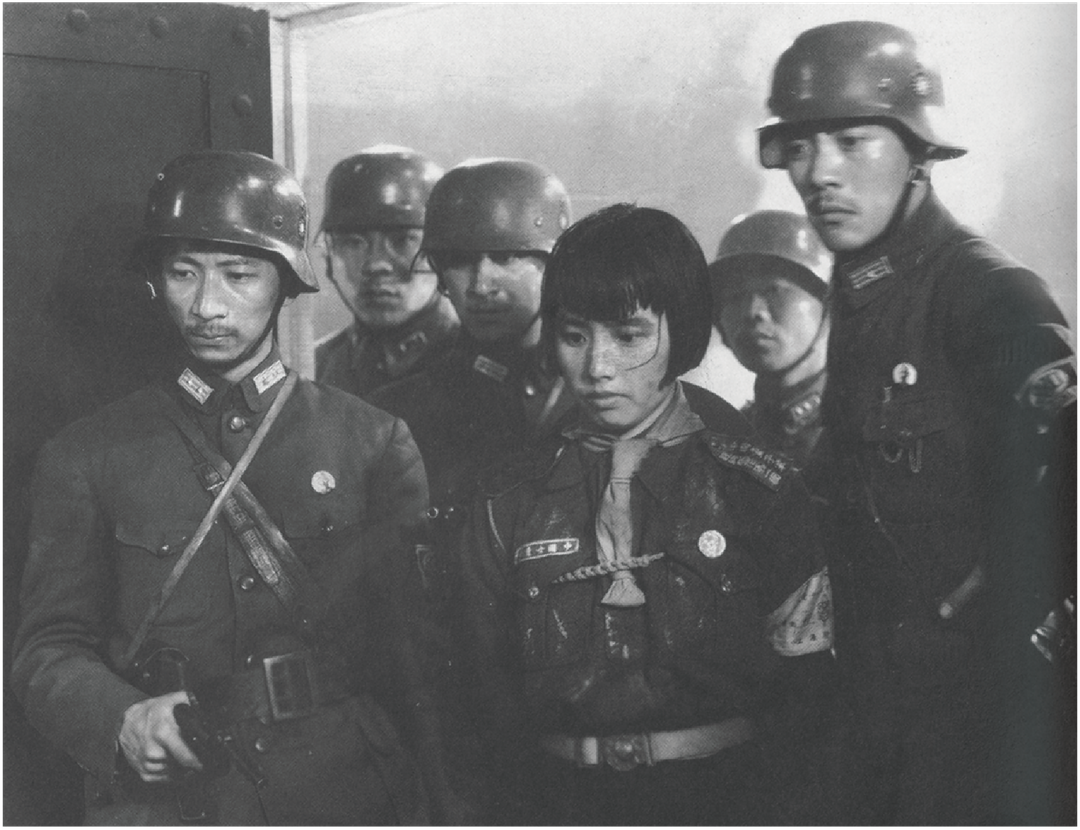
Still from Babai zhuangshi (800 Heroes)

On August 13, 1937, the Imperial Japanese Army invades Shanghai, Xie Jinyuan, the Lieutenant Colonel of the 524th Regiment of the 88th Division of the National Revolutionary Army, leads more than 400 young officers to guard the Sihang Warehouse.

== Cast ==
- Yuan Muzhi as Lieutenant Colonel Xie Jinyuan
- Chen Bo'er as Yang Huimin, a girl scout guide deliver a flag to the soldiers
- Hong Hong as Yao Ruifang
- Zhang Shufan as Battalion Commander Yang

== Release ==
800 Heroes was released on April 2, 1938, in China.

== See also ==
- The Eight Hundred
- Eight Hundred Heroes
