= Daughter of the Party =

1958 film

- DVD cover
- Directed by: Lin Nong
- Production company: Changchun Film Studio
- Release date: 1958
- Country: China
- Language: Mandarin Chinese

Daughter of the Party (Chinese: 党的女儿) is a 1958 Chinese film directed by Lin Nong and produced by Changchun Film Studio. The film tells the story of three young women in their struggle to establish a Chinese Communist Party cell.

The film spawned a number of variant settings including a Chinese-language western-style opera True Daughter of the Party (also 1958), a play (1959), and a TV series (2011).
