= Manchukuo Film Association =

Japanese-Manchurian film studio

Chinese name
- Traditional Chinese: 株式會社滿洲映畫協會
- Simplified Chinese: 株式会社满洲映画协会
Transcriptions
Standard Mandarin
- Hanyu Pinyin: Zhūshìhuìshè Mǎnzhōu Yìng Huà Xiéhuì
- Wade–Giles: Chu1-shih4-hui4-she4 Man3-chou1 Ying4 Hua4 Hsieh2-hui4

Japanese name
- Kanji: 株式會社滿洲映畫協會
Transcriptions
- Romanization: Kabushiki kaisha Manshū eiga kyōkai

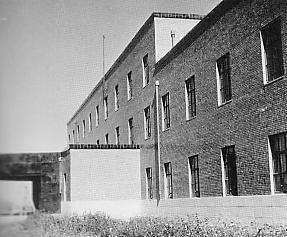
Manchukuo Film Association Studios

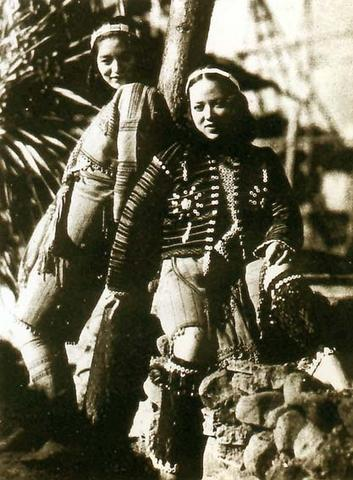
Scene from the Man'ei produced Sayon no kane (1943), starring Ri Kōran

Manchukuo Film Association Corporation (株式會社滿洲映畫協會, Kabushiki kaisha Manshū eiga kyōkai) or Man'ei (滿映) (Chinese: 株式會社滿洲映畫協會) was a Japanese film studio in Manchukuo during the 1930s and 1940s.

After the Soviet invasion of Manchuria, the Soviet Red Army facilitated the transfer of Man-ei's assets and equipment to the Chinese communists. This became the basis for the Chinese Communist Party's first full function film studio, the Northeastern Film Studio.

== Background ==
Man'ei was established by the Kwantung Army in the occupied northeast part of China in 1937. Man'ei controlled the entire process of film production, as well as release and international distribution of Manchurian films. With its large-scale investment and capital, Man'ei mainly focused on producing political films, dramas, propaganda, and documentaries. Man'ei also expanded its film production across Japanese-occupied East Asia and exported these productions to Axis countries to achieve the goal of making Manchukuo a "Dream Land of Film Making". The company established relations with Japanese-controlled distribution networks and film studios. In 1939, Man'ei built a new studio in Changchun with cutting-edge equipment; it also ran film schools from 1937 to 1944 which produced hundreds of alumni. The company’s size grew from employing 900 people in December 1940 to 1,800 by November 1944.

== History ==
Man'ei was established on August 14, 1937, as a national policy company (國策會社, kokusaku kaisha) which was a joint venture between the government of Manchukuo and the South Manchurian Railway Company. The original studios were located at a former wool goods factory, with the offices at the former Kitsurin Architectural Institute (吉林省建築設計院) in Kitsurin Province. Unlike Japan's film markets in Taiwan and Korea, Man'ei was promoted as being a Japanese-run Chinese film studio from its start. Man'ei grew out of the Southern Manchurian Railway's Photographic Division, which was initially charged with producing industrial and educational films about Manchukuo for Japanese audiences. Promotional materials from the studios boasted that Man'ei had the most state-of-the art facilities in all of Asia at that time. Negishi Kan'ichi was recruited from Nikkatsu's Tamagawa Studios to oversee feature film productions.

In 1939, Nobusuke Kishi enlisted Masahiko Amakasu, head of Manchukuo's Ministry of Civil Affairs, to replace Negishi. Amakasu effectively used his status as a film industry outsider, as well as his notoriety as the murderer of Osugi Sakae and family to maintain the Man'ei's independence from the mainland Japanese film industry. Amakasu was frequently critical and sometimes hostile to Japanese perceptions of Man'ei. As a result of a 1936 tour of Nazi Germany and Fascist Italy, Amakasu was able to visit the studios Universum Film AG (UFA) and Cinecittà. After taking up his post at Man’ei, Amakasu was determined to reform the studio's production system after UFA's in order to compete with both Hollywood and the Japanese film industry. This included using staff from the Towa Company to assist him in procuring the latest German movie cameras and production techniques. Amakasu also hosted notables from the Japanese film industry including movie stars, directors, and orchestral conductors such as Takashi Asahina. Although Amakasu was considered right-wing, he hired many left-wing and Communist sympathizers at a time when they were being purged from the Japanese film industry.

Amakasu is also credited with launching the career of the actress and singer Yoshiko Yamaguchi. Chinese audiences regarded her as a Chinese girl, as she spoke fluent Mandarin. After the Pacific War, she returned to Japan, from where she later pursued a career in Hollywood under the name Shirley Yamaguchi.

Man'ei distinguished itself from other Japanese colonial film studios. Amakasu maintained that his primary audience was not Japanese, but Manchurian. In a 1942 article entitled "Making Films for the Manchurians," Amakasu stated: "There is absolutely no need to make films that exoticize Manchukuo for Japan. Japan will probably make their own films that get it wrong anyhow, vulgarizing the unusual aspects of Manchuria. We must not forget that our focus is the Manchurians and, after we make headway, nothing should keep us from producing films for Japan."

Following Japan's unconditional surrender in August 1945, the Soviet Red Army helped the Chinese communists to take over Man'ei. The former colonial studio was relocated to Hegang, where it was established as Northeastern Film Studio, the communist party's first full-capacity film studio. Yuan Muzhi was its director and Chen Bo'er was its party secretary. Northeastern Film Studio began production in early 1947, focusing on news and documentary films, as well as some fiction, educational film for children, and animation.

== Films and publications ==
At its peak, Man'ei became the largest and most technologically advanced film studio in Asia. Various features were made and released to the Greater East Asia Co-Prosperity Sphere.

Modernization was the central theme of both educational and entertainment films. Although most of Man'ei's films were destroyed on the orders of the Japanese military, the American military managed to retrieve a number of them. They stored these documents in the National Archive and Records Administration after the Japanese surrender in 1945.

According to a 1939 survey of educated Manchurian viewers, Man'ei films were found to be dull and implausible, reflecting little knowledge of real life in Manchukuo. In response, Man'ei strived to produce high-quality dramas. Educational films continued to occupy a large proportion of Man’ei's productions. Later, the company decided to utilize a new method, which combined familiar elements of life with an imperial ideology in order to reach a propagandistic goal.

Man'ei established a film magazine entitled Manshū eiga (満州映画), which was published from December 1937 to September 1940. These included serialized novelizations of Man'ei films and entertainment news. Manshū eiga also published film criticism, although domestic scholars always complained about the quality of Man'ei's production. However, Amakasu responded, "the films of [Man’ei] are primarily targeted at the uncultured masses... We must treat and educate them like children, and explain things to them slowly and in plain language."

== Legacy ==
Man’ei is controversial in the history of Chinese cinema since its works are viewed in China as pro-Japanese propaganda.

About half of the Association's film archives were lost to the Soviets in the aftermath of World War II. In May 1995, Japan repurchased the films that were in the lost segment. Initially a Japanese company packaged the films in 30 episodes to be sold in Japan at 300,000 yen. The Chinese government lodged an official complaint about the legitimacy of the matter, since the government of the People's Republic of China claims copyright ownership of any of the former works of Manchukuo, and the films were reproduced without China's consent. Japan agreed to give some works back as compensation. Some are preserved today in China's National Film Archives, others are preserved in the Changchun Film Studio.

== See also ==
- Cinema of China
- Cinema of Japan

== Sources ==
- Baskett, Michael (2008). The Attractive Empire: Transnational Film Culture in Imperial Japan. Honolulu: University of Hawai'i Press. ISBN 978-0-8248-3223-0.
- Nornes, Abé Mark (1994). Japan/America Film Wars: WWII Propaganda and Its Cultural Contexts. Harwood Academic Publishers. ISBN 3-7186-0562-7.
- Young, Louise (1999). Japan's Total Empire: Manchuria and the Culture of Wartime Imperialism. University of California Press. ISBN 0-520-21934-1.
