= The Eight Hundred =

2020 Chinese historical war drama film by Guan Hu

- Theatrical release poster
- Chinese: 八佰
- Hanyu Pinyin: Bābǎi
- Directed by: Guan Hu
- Written by: Guan Hu; Ge Rui
- Produced by: Wang Zhonglei; Liang Jing
- Starring: Huang Zhizhong; Oho Ou; Wang Qianyuan; Jiang Wu; Zhang Yi; Du Chun; Vision Wei; Li Chen; Yu Haoming
- Cinematography: Cao Yu
- Edited by: Yiran Tu; He Yongyi
- Music by: Andrew Kawczynski
- Production companies: Huayi Brothers; Tencent Pictures; Beijing Enlight Media; Alibaba Pictures
- Distributed by: Huayi Brothers; CMC Pictures Holdings (international)
- Release date: August 21, 2020 (China)
- Running time: 147 minutes
- Country: China
- Languages: Mandarin; Japanese; English
- Budget: $80 million
- Box office: $461.4 million

The Eight Hundred (Chinese: 八佰) is a 2020 Chinese historical war drama film directed by and co-written by Guan Hu, and starring Huang Zhizhong, Oho Ou, Wang Qianyuan, Jiang Wu, Zhang Yi, Du Chun, Vision Wei, Li Chen, and Yu Haoming. The film is based on the 1937 defense of Sihang Warehouse by Chinese troops of the National Revolutionary Army during the Battle of Shanghai in the early stages of the Second Sino-Japanese War.

Originally scheduled for release in July 2019, the premiere and the nationwide release was moved to August 21, 2020. The film was a critical and commercial success, grossing $461 million worldwide, making it the second highest-grossing film of 2020.

== Plot ==
During the early days of the Second Sino-Japanese War, and on a greater scale World War II, the Imperial Japanese Army invaded Shanghai in what became known as the Battle of Shanghai. After holding back the Japanese for over 3 months, and suffering heavy losses, the Chinese army was forced to retreat due to the danger of being encircled. Lieutenant Colonel Xie Jinyuan of the 524th Regiment of the under-equipped 88th Division of the National Revolutionary Army, led 452 young officers and soldiers to defend Sihang Warehouse against the 3rd Imperial Japanese Division consisting of around 20,000 troops on a heroic suicidal last stand against the Japanese under an order by Generalissimo of Nationalist China, Chiang Kai-shek.

The Sihang warehouse, where most of the scenes are set, in 2006

The decision was made to provide a morale boost to the Chinese people after the losses of Beijing and Shanghai, and helped spur support from the Western powers, who were in full view of the battle from the International Settlement in Shanghai just across the Suzhou Creek.

The full force of the regiment—eight hundred strong—was reported in media sources of the time to project military strength. The soldiers came to be known as the "Eight Hundred Heroes" (八百壮士).

== Cast ==
- Huang Zhizhong as Lao Hulu
- Oho Ou as Duan Wu
- Wang Qianyuan as Yang Guai
- Jiang Wu as Lao Tie
- Zhang Yi as Lao Suanpan
- Du Chun as Lieutenant Colonel Xie Jinyuan
- Vision Wei as Zhu Shengzhong
- Li Chen as a soldier
- Yu Haoming as Shangguan Zhibiao, company commander
- Zhang Junyi as Xiao Hubei
- Zhang Cheng as company commander Lei Xiong
- Zhang Youhao as Xiao Qiyue
- Yu Kailei as Luo Yangchan
- Zheng Kai as Chen Shusheng, deputy squad leader
- Tang Yixin as Yang Huimin
- Hideo Nakaizumi as Colonel Konoe Isao
- Li Jiuxiao as Dao Zi
- Hou Yong as the professor
- Liang Jing as the professor's wife
- Xu Jiawen (Augusta Xu-Holland) as Eva
- Xin Baiqing as Fang Xingwen
- Cao Weiyu as Yu Hongjun
- Liu Xiaoqing as Sister Rong
- Yao Chen as He Xiangning
- Huang Xiaoming as Special correspondent

== Production ==
Guan Hu had been preparing for the film for 10 years. The Eight Hundred is the first Chinese film or commercial Asian film shot entirely on IMAX cameras. The production team had built a real set of 68 buildings with an area of 133,333 square metres (1,435,180 square feet) in Suzhou, east China's Jiangsu province. The investment amount of the film is as high as CN¥ 550,000,000 (US$ 80,000,000).

Principal photography started on 9 September 2017 and wrapped on 27 April 2018.

== Soundtrack ==
A theme song for the film titled "Remembering" (苏州河) was written by Bob Ezrin, Shridhar Solanki, Cheng Zhang and Isabel Yue Yin based on the melody of the Londonderry Air and was performed by Andrea Bocelli and Na Ying. The theme song had both an English and Mandarin version. The theme song was accompanied by the film's main theme and score written by Rupert Gregson-Williams and Andrew Kawczynski.

The Eight Hundred Official Movie Soundtrack
Name	Author/Singer(s)	Duration
When I Turn to Dust	Andrew Kawczynski	2:48
Great City in Ruins	Andrew Kawczynski	2:48
Day 1	Andrew Kawczynski	4:51
White Horse	Andrew Kawczynski	1:50
Imminent Danger	Andrew Kawczynski	3:10
Overstepped Boundaries	Andrew Kawczynski	5:29
Day 2	Andrew Kawczynski	4:10
True Heroes	Andrew Kawczynski	5:36
Day 3	Andrew Kawczynski	4:01
Pure Gold Fears No Fire	Andrew Kawczynski	4:39
A Vision	Andrew Kawczynski	2:50
Day 4	Andrew Kawczynski	4:55
Politics of War	Andrew Kawczynski	3:59
The World is Watching Us	Andrew Kawczynski	3:12
Before the Dawn	Andrew Kawczynski	3:32
Take Cover	Andrew Kawczynski	6:48
Last Stand	Andrew Kawczynski	2:35
You Will See My Smile	Andrew Kawczynski	2:37
Remembering (Chinese Version)	Andrea Bocelli and Na Ying	4:51
Remembering (International Version)	Andrea Bocelli and Na Ying	4:52

== Release ==
The film was originally scheduled to premiere on 15 June 2019 during the prestigious opening slot of the Shanghai International Film Festival but was pushed back to 5 July, due to "consultation between the production team and other entities". Before the withdrawal, the Chinese Red Culture Research Association, a group managed by the state-run Chinese Academy of Social Sciences, held an academic conference on filmmaking where attendees voiced opinions on the film. Attendees did not agree with the portrayal of the National Revolutionary Army, saying the film failed to portray "the class oppression within the ranks of the Kuomintang army, the misdeeds of its officers and its evil oppression of the people". According to a report published on the social media platform WeChat, the participants complained that the film excessively glorified the Kuomintang army.

Afterwards, the film's screening at the Shanghai film festival was cancelled. Jia Zhangke, a prominent filmmaker, criticised the decision, saying on Sina Weibo "[things] cannot be done like that for the moviemaking business".

The film was then delayed yet again from its 5 July 2019 release date. Pushed back by over a year until 2 August 2020, the producers announced that the film was scheduled for release on 21 August 2020 nationwide in China. The theatrical version is said to be 13 minutes shorter than the one that would have screened in 2019 at the Shanghai film festival.

== Reception ==
=== Box office ===
Previews of the film were screened on Friday 14 August, making $2.1 million, then on Monday 17 August and Tuesday 18 August, making about $7.6 million each night for a preview total of $16.8 million. It then made $40 million on its official opening day. It went on to gross a total of $116 million (RMB 803.2) in its opening weekend (including previews), the biggest debut of 2020 up to that point. In calendar year 2020, The Eight Hundred had grossed more in a single territory than any other release, having made $366 million in China. In total, it earned $484.2 million, making it the second highest-grossing film of 2020.

=== Critical response ===
On review aggregator Rotten Tomatoes, the film holds an approval rating of 89% based on 27 critic reviews, 78% based on 100+ user reviews, with an average rating of 6.8/10. On Metacritic, it has a weighted average score of 64 out of 100, based on 7 critic reviews, indicating "generally favorable reviews".

Ian Freer from Empire awarded the film 4 stars out of 5, writing, "The Eight Hundred is sprawling, and doesn't do anything in a hurry — the main title appears 20 minutes in — and there are ultimately too many characters to care about, but everywhere you turn there is fantastic filmmaking, flitting between grand sweep and quieter moments."

Maggie Lee of Variety described the film as "monumental, if sometimes unwieldy", comparing it to Dunkirk (2017) and writing, "the saga does share similar sentiments of survival, grit and triumph in defeat ... it too plunges audiences into both the intimacy and magnitude of brutal war spectacle while immersing them in a stunningly mounted period canvas." However, she also felt that "the character roster is so bloated, it's hard to keep up with their trajectories — and ultimately, to care deeply. As Col. Xie Jinyuan, whose leadership was the driving force of their indomitable resilience, Du Chun displays almost no range in his performance."

Cath Clarke of The Guardian awarded the film 3 stars out of 5, characterizing the film as an "Ear-rattling, breathtaking battle for [the] Chinese Alamo ... Guan goes hammer and tongs with the special effects, delivering stupendously, joint-rattlingly-loud battle scenes and combat sequences edited to the lightning pace of a superhero movie." However, he expressed that "it's hard to care much about who lives or dies", because "with so much intense focus lavished on the action, there's none to spare for the characters' emotional lives".

Michael Ordoña of the Los Angeles Times, reviewing the shorter theatrical version of the film, similarly commented that it "skips over the whole character-development part, along with the logic of many choices and scenes ... Rather than immersing us in the moment as, say, Black Hawk Down does with its unrelenting intensity, Eight Hundred has plenty of meandering downtime spread out among its massive cast of characters. Yet somehow, we don't get to know any of these folks." He added that it celebrated "fervent nationalism" or "fetishized martyrdom" and described the "sort-of protagonists" as "more types than actual people".

=== Accolades ===
Award	Date of ceremony	Category	Recipient(s)	Result	Ref.
Visual Effects Society Awards	April 6, 2021	Outstanding Created Environment in a Photoreal Feature	Sefano Cieri, Aaron Auty, Simon Carlile, Patrick Zentis (for 1937 Shanghai Downtown)	Nominated	
Visual Effects Society Awards	April 6, 2021	Outstanding Created Environment in a Photoreal Feature	Jamie Macdougall, Mark Honer, David Pekarek (for Shanghai Warehouse District)	Nominated	
Golden Reel Awards	April 16, 2021	Outstanding Achievement in Sound Editing – Foreign Language Feature	Kang Fu, Steve Miller, Ai Long Tan, Lan Long, Fei Yu	Won	

== See also ==
- 800 Heroes
- Eight Hundred Heroes
