= Children of Troubled Times =

1935 Chinese film

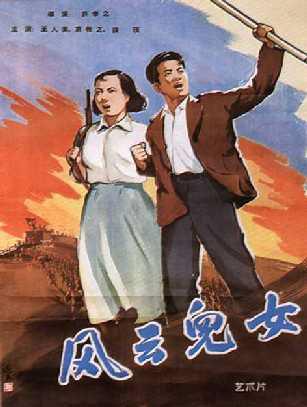
- Film poster

Chinese name
- Traditional Chinese: 風雲兒女
- Simplified Chinese: 风云儿女
- Literal meaning: Storm Sons [&] Daughters; Children of the Storm
Transcriptions
Standard Mandarin
- Hanyu Pinyin: Fēngyún Érnǚ
- Wade–Giles: Feng-yün Erh-nü
- Directed by: Xu Xingzhi
- Written by: Tian Han; Xia Yan
- Produced by: Zhu Qinglan
- Starring: Yuan Muzhi; Wang Renmei
- Cinematography: Wu Yinxian
- Edited by: Chen Xiangxing
- Music by: He Luting
- Production company: Diantong Film Company
- Release date: 24 May 1935 (China)
- Running time: 90 minutes
- Country: China
- Language: Mandarin

Children of Troubled Times, also known as Fēngyún Érnǚ, Scenes of City Life, Sons and Daughters of the Storm, Storm Sons and Daughters, Children of the Storm, and several other translations, is a patriotic 1935 Chinese film most famous as the origin of "The March of the Volunteers", the national anthem of the People's Republic of China. The movie was directed by Xu Xingzhi and written by Tian Han and Xia Yan. Yuan Muzhi plays an intellectual who flees the trouble in Shanghai to pursue the glamorous Wang Renmei only to join the Chinese resistance after the death of his friend.

== Plot ==
Children of Troubled Times (full film)

A young poet Xin Baihe flees Shanghai with his friend, Liang. Liang soon joins the resistance against the Japanese invaders, but Xin chooses to pursue a relationship with a glamorous and westernized widow in Qingdao.

After hearing that Liang has been killed, however, Xin has a change of heart and rushes to join the war effort.

== Communist themes ==
The film was a strong communist production, produced by the Diantong Film Company and based on a story by Tian Han, a Chinese Communist Party (CCP) member since 1932. Tian was arrested by the Nationalists shortly after it was released. In addition, it starred Yuan Muzhi, who would join the CCP in 1940 and had music by the communist composer Nie Er.

The story itself, with its tale of a wealthy man who learns to abandon the decadence of Western culture for self-sacrifice, was also a common theme among leftist films of the period.

== Theme ==
A scene from the movie, including "March of the Volunteers".

The theme song of the movie, "March of the Volunteers", was sung by Gu Menghe and Yuan Muzhi. The song was released as an album by the Pathé Records label (which later became part of EMI in 1935). It was selected as the provisional national anthem of the People's Republic of China in 1949. This decision was formally written into its constitution in March 2004.

== Reception ==
The film received positive reviews and the song became a popular tune among members of the Communist party, including the 200th Division based in Wuhan that was sent to fight the Japanese during the Second Sino-Japanese War.

== See also ==
- Cinema of China
- Second Sino-Japanese War
- Marco Polo Bridge incident
- Nie Er
- The National Anthem
