= Situ Huimin =

Chinese film director, screenwriter and actor (1910–1987)

Situ Huimin (Chinese: 司徒慧敏; pinyin: Sītú Huìmǐn; 16 February 1910 – 4 April 1987) was a Chinese film director, screenwriter and actor, born in Kaiping, Guangdong.

He joined the Communist Youth League in 1925 and the Chinese Communist Party in 1927. The next year, he went to Japan to study arts and there, he became interested in filmmaking. After returning to China in 1930, he actively participated in left-wing theater movement. Then, he worked as set designer and sound engineer in film industry. His debut as a film director was Spirit of Freedom (Chinese: 自由神), produced by Diantong Film Company in 1935. Subsequently, he joined the Lianhua Film Company in Shanghai. After the outbreak of the Second Sino-Japanese War he went to British Hong Kong, where he continued to work both in film and in theater. During this period he created couple of anti-Japanese films. In 1943 he worked on newsreels in Chongqing, then temporary or martial capital of China. After the war, he helped to organize the Kunlun Film Company. Then, he left to the United States to study film technology and management. He came back in 1950s, to continue to work in China's film industry, holding many important offices for the government. He died in Beijing on April 4, 1987.

== Selected filmography as a director ==
- Spirit of Freedom (自由神) (1935)
- Lianhua Symphony (1937) – A segment in an anthology film
- The Blood-stained Baoshan Fortress (1938, Hong Kong)
- Hometown Cloud (1940, Hong Kong)
- Song of Retribution (1941, Hong Kong)
