= Northeast Film Studio =

Chinese Communist Party movie production company

Northeast Film Studio or Northeastern Film Studio (Chinese: 东北电影制片厂; pinyin: Dōngběi Diànyǐng Zhìpiànchǎng) was one of the first formally established movie production company in the northeast part of China. It was the Chinese Communist Party's first full-function film studio.

== Early history ==
Following Japan's unconditional surrender in August 1945, the Soviet Red Army helped the Chinese communists to take over the Japanese colonial film establishment in Manchuria, the Manchukuo Film Association (Man-ei). Man-ei had state-of-the-art film production equipment and supplies. The former colonial studio was relocated to Hegang, where it was established as Northeast Film Studio, the communist party's first full-capacity film studio. Yuan Muzhi was its director and Chen Bo'er was its CCP committee secretary. Northeastern Film Studio began production in early 1947, focusing on news and documentary films, as well as some fiction, educational film for children, and animation.

At the time it is the first known studio established by a communist party. Northeast Film Studio trained the first generation of communist Chinese documentary filmmakers.

The studio's production capacity grew significantly from 1947 to 1949. It increased its film production teams by a factor of ten and shot 300,000 feet of documentary film, including important battle of the Chinese Civil War. Many of its newly trained documentary filmmakers were immediately sent to the front where they recorded the advance of the People's Liberation Army against the Nationalists.

== Separation ==
The War of Liberation would break out in 1949 forcing the studio to move to Changchun. By 1955 the Northeast Film Studio technically no longer exist, since China's Ministry of Culture would officially rename the new combined entity as Changchun Film Studio.

The animators, mostly the group that worked with Chinese animation such as the Emperor's Dream would move to Shanghai. The Wan brothers and the talents of Central Academy of Fine Arts, the Art Institute of Suzhou and many other big-name artists would all be concentrated in this studio for the first time to form the Shanghai Animation Film Studio.

== See also ==
- History of Chinese Animation
- Cinema of China
- Chinese Animation
