= Anbu, Guangdong =

Coordinates: 22°16′N 112°49′E

Anbu
- Town

Chinese transcription(s)
- Interactive map of Anbu
- Country: China
- Province: Guangdong
- Prefecture: Chaozhou
- Time zone: UTC+8 (China Standard Time)

Anbu (Chinese: 庵埠) is a township-level division situated in Chao'an District, Chaozhou, Guangdong, China.

== See also ==
- List of township-level divisions of Guangdong
