= Plunder of Peach and Plum =

- Film poster
- Directed by: Ying Yunwei
- Written by: Ying Yunwei; Yuan Muzhi
- Produced by: Ma Dejian
- Starring: Yuan Muzhi; Chen Bo'er; Tang Huaiqiu; Zhou Boxun
- Cinematography: Wu Weiyun
- Edited by: Chen Xiangxing
- Music by: Nie Er
- Production company: Diantong Film Company
- Release date: December 16, 1934
- Running time: 100 minutes
- Country: China
- Language: Mandarin

Plunder of Peach and Plum (Chinese: 桃李劫; pinyin: Táolǐ jié) is an early Chinese sound film from 1934. Produced by the left-leaning Shanghai-based Diantong Film Company, Plunder was directed by Ying Yunwei and starred popular actor Yuan Muzhi (who also co-wrote the screenplay). It is alternatively known as The Fate of Graduates.

The film was featured in the 62nd Venice International Film Festival as part of their retrospective, The Secret History of Asian Cinema.

The theme song for the film is called "Graduation Song" (毕业歌).

== Plot ==
The film tells the tragic story of two recent college graduates, Tao Jianping ("Tao" is a homophone for peach), and Li Lilian ("Li" is a homophone for plum). Married, the two hope to change society for the better, but are continuously challenged by the corruption and injustice of Chinese society.

== Cast ==
- Yuan Muzhi as Tao
- Chen Bo'er as Li
