= He Mengfu =

Chinese film and theatre director

He Mengfu (simplified Chinese: 贺孟斧; traditional Chinese: 賀孟斧; pinyin: Hè Mèngfǔ; 1911 – 10 May 1945) was a Chinese film and theatre director from Wujin, Jiangsu. A 1931 graduate of the Peking University drama department, he was associated with Shanghai-based Lianhua Film Company during the 1930s, as well as many theatre organizations and institutions, including the Nanjing National Theatre Academy.

He died on 10 May 1945 in Chongqing.
