= Yuan Muzhi =

Chinese film director (1909–1978)

- 袁牧之
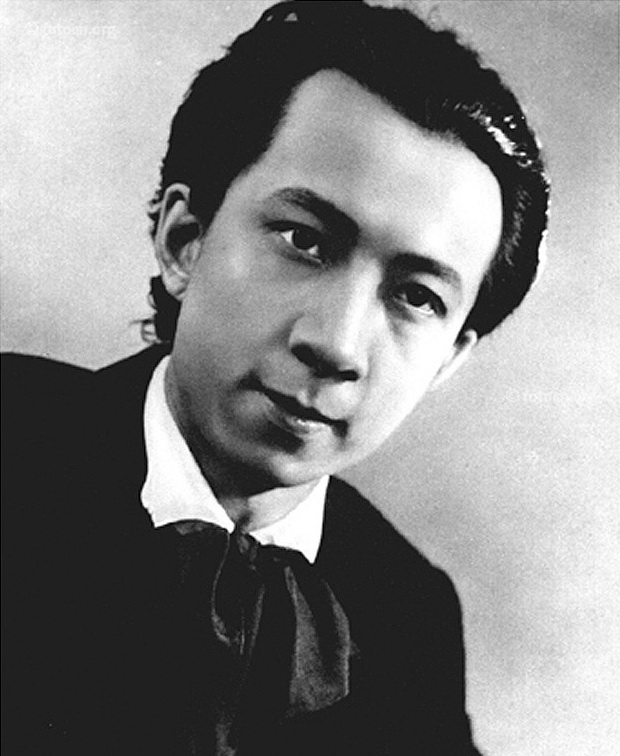
- Born: Yuan Jialai; March 3, 1909; Ningbo, Zhejiang, Qing Empire
- Died: January 30, 1978 (aged 68); Beijing, China
- Occupations: Actor, film director
- Years active: 1934 – 1938
- Spouse: Chen Bo'er (m. 1947; died 1951)

Chinese name
- Chinese: 袁牧之
Transcriptions
Standard Mandarin
- Hanyu Pinyin: Yuán Mùzhī

Yuan Muzhi (Chinese: 袁牧之) (born Yuan Jialai (Chinese: 袁家莱); March 3, 1909 – January 30, 1978) was an actor and director from the Republic of China and later of the People's Republic of China. He is best known for his film Street Angel (1937), which is regarded as a masterpiece of the Chinese left-wing movement.

== Career ==
As an actor, Yuan became extremely popular and took on the nickname "man with a thousand faces". He gained prominence in a series of films for the leftist Diantong Film Company. These included the film Plunder of Peach and Plum (1935) (which Yuan also wrote) and the movie Sons and Daughters in a Time of Storm (1935) where he was one of the two original singers (along with Gu Menghe) of the movie's theme song, The March of the Volunteers, which later became the national anthem of China.

His career eventually brought him to director's chair. Yuan's filmmaking debut, the innovative musical comedy Scenes of City Life (1935) (Dushi fengguang), was one of the earliest non-silent features made in China, as the Shanghai industry was finally transitioning to sound. The film's blend of screwball humor and romance reflected Yuan's harsh, documentary style social observations of middle class existence in the failing economy in Great Depression-era Shanghai. The father of one main character is a pawn shop owner, who in one humorous scene, is so hard up for cash himself—since no one has any money left to reclaim their pawned goods—he even attempts to pawn items from his own shop with another proprietor. The opening of the film features an extended montage of Shanghai's new, modern cityscape of the time, and its landmarks, such as neon signs, theatre marquees, and the Shanghai Cathedral. Jiang Qing, the future wife of Mao Zedong, appeared in a relatively minor role in the film. She would later lead the denunciation of many of Yuan's leftist colleagues in the Shanghai filmmaking scene, accusing them of being rightists, destroying their careers and lives.

Yuan's second film, Street Angel (1937) (Malu tianshi), starred then-unknown Zhou Xuan, who performed He Luting's popular songs written for the film, "Song of the Four Seasons" and "The Wandering Songstress", and became one of China's most adored divas for the remainder of her life. Street Angel is considered one of the most important Chinese films of all time, a highlight of the "second generation" of Chinese cinema. An experimental blend of comedy and tragedy, Yuan's story followed a group of young friends whose lack of financial means and social status frustrated their dreams of happiness, including a girl singer, her prostitute sister, and her soldier lover, home briefly between fighting the Japanese occupying north China. The film, released shortly before Japan invaded Shanghai and initiated the Second Sino-Japanese War in summer 1937, became a massive hit with audiences. Subsequently, Street Angel was seen to mark one of the last products of the "golden age of Chinese cinema" of the 1930s, before artists were forced to retreat to Shanghai's foreign concessions and finally came under Japanese propaganda control.

Yuan also continued to act in roles, notably 800 Heroes (1938) depicting the events of the Defense of Sihang Warehouse.

In 1938, Yuan participated in discussions on the development of "national defense cinema" and was a founder of Yan'an Film Group. Yuan arrived in Yan'an in fall 1938. With Wu Yinxian, Yuan made a feature-length documentary, Yan'an and the Eighth Route Army, which depicted the Eighth Route Army's combat against the Japanese. They also filmed Norman Bethune performing surgeries close to the front lines.

After the People's Republic of China was founded in 1949, Yuan continued to be a major figure in the film industry, helping to found Dongbei Film Studio, which eventually became the first state-controlled production companies in the People's Republic of China. At the end of the Second Sino-Japanese War, Yuan and Chen Bo'er were sent by the Communist Party to take over what remained of the Manchurian Motion Picture Association, which eventually became Dongbei Film Studio. In 1949, Yuan became the Director of the Film Bureau and developed a nationwide film exhibition network to extend cinema beyond urban centers. Yuan thus had a major role in the development of the PRC's theories and practices of mobile projectionists traveling through rural China to play films. Yuan was also a delegate to the first National People's Congress and the third Chinese People's Political Consultative Conference.

However he was later persecuted and forced to resign in 1954. During the Cultural Revolution, he was exiled to the May 7th Cadre School in Danjiang, Hubei. In the spring of 1978, he fell ill and was unable to seek medical treatment due to political interference in the hospital. He died in Beijing on June 30 of the same year at the age of 69.

== Selected filmography ==
=== Actor ===
Year	English Title	Chinese Title	Role
1934	Plunder of Peach and Plum	桃李劫	Tao
1935	Sons and Daughters in a Time of Storm	風雲兒女	Xin Baihe
1935	Scenes of City Life	都市風光	
1936	Unchanged Heart in Life and Death	生死同心	
1938	800 Heroes	八百壯士	

=== Director ===
Year	English Title	Chinese Title	Notes
1935	Scenes of City Life	都市風光	Also known as Cityscape
1937	Street Angel	馬路天使	
