= Chen Bo'er =

Chinese actor and film director (1907–1951)

- 陳波兒
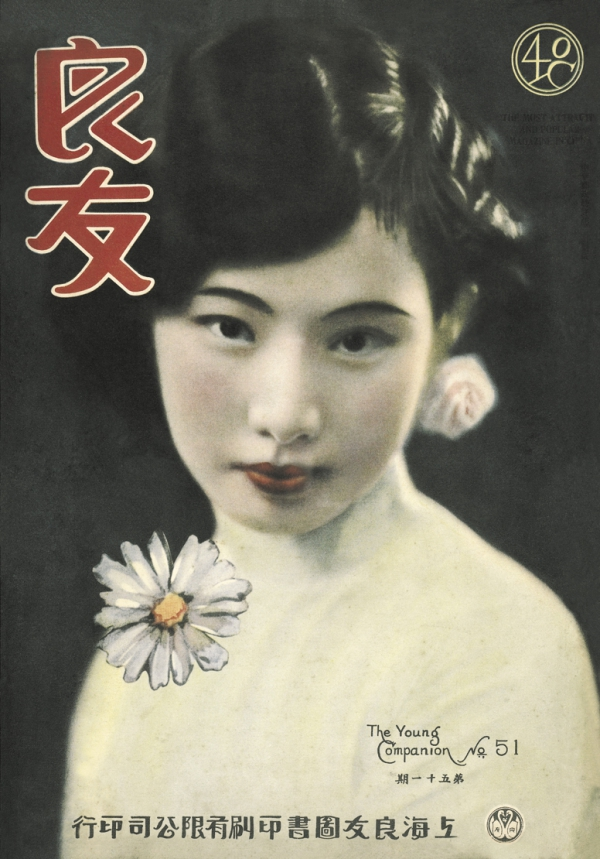
- Chen on the cover of Liangyou Magazine, 1930
- Born: Chen Shunhua; July 15, 1907; Anbu, Guangdong, Qing Empire
- Died: November 10, 1951 (aged 44); Shanghai, China
- Occupations: Actress; Filmmaker; Producer; Party Secretary (Northeast Film Studio); Art Department Director (Northeast Film Studio and Central Film Bureau)
- Spouse(s): Ren Posheng (m. 1929; sep. 1946) Yuan Muzhi (m. 1947)
- Children: 2

Chinese name
- Traditional Chinese: 陳波兒
- Simplified Chinese: 陈波儿
Transcriptions
Standard Mandarin
- Hanyu Pinyin: Chén Bō'ér
Yue: Cantonese
- Jyutping: can4 bo1 ji4

Chen Bo'er (Chinese: 陳波兒; pinyin: Chén Bō'ér; 1907–1951) was a prolific and revolutionary left-wing Chinese actress and filmmaker in the 1930s and 40s before her premature death in 1951. She began her activism work in Shanghai, writing essays for magazines and newspapers, where she expounded her beliefs about feminism, women's rights, and national salvation. It was also in Shanghai that Chen became a notable celebrity, starring in films and theatre productions and advocating for leftwing pro-communist revolution. In Yan'an, the then de facto capital of Communist China where she established a film studio backed by the Communist government, she produced anti-Japanese theatre and drama performances, and assisted in screenwriting, directing, and producing. She was the first female director endorsed by the Communist government. She later moved to Changchun to work as Party secretary of the Northeast Film Studio, where she was a pioneer of Chinese animation. In Beijing, Chen was made art department director of the Central Film Bureau. She advocated for the establishment of the People's Republic of China's first national film school, the Beijing Film Academy. Chen Bo'er was an ardent feminist, whose work paved the way for women filmmakers and revolutionaries in China.

== Early life ==
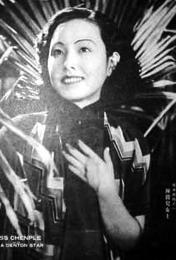
Chen in 1935.

Chen Shunhua (陳舜華) was born in the small town of Anbu, Chaozhou County, Guangdong Province. Though Chen's grave marks her birth year as 1910, her biographer Wang Yongfang uses the year 1907 based on Chen's personal archives. She was born to a wealthy family, and was deeply loved by both her father and concubine mother, but greatly disliked by her grandmother and father's first wife. Nonetheless, her elite status allowed her to go – as was customary for children of wealthy families – to a larger city for high school.

Leaving behind Anbu, Chen studied in Nanjing and Shanghai, where she learned to speak English on top of her native Cantonese and middle school Mandarin. Despite being a good student, excelling especially in the arts and essay writing, Chen was expelled for protesting against the 1927 Shanghai Massacre.

Chen was encouraged by leftist ex-cadet friends, Mei Gongyi and Ren Posheng, to go back to school, and in 1928 Chen returned to Shanghai where she joined the Shanghai Arts College. It was here that Chen became a member of the Communist-organized and leftist Shanghai Art Drama Troupe (SADT). She graduated from Shanghai Art University in 1929.

In 1937, Chen joined the CCP (Chinese Communist Party). Chen would go on to play central roles in China's early socialist film sphere.

== Writing career ==
Before becoming an integral part of Shanghai, Yan'an, and the Northeast's revolutionary film worlds, Chen made her living writing essays which expressed her beliefs in feminism and socialism through the late-1920s and early-30s. Chen wrote for the well-read newspaper, the Shanghai Daily (The Shenbao), on her patriotic and feminist positions, as well as other magazines.

Zheng Wang notes that one of Chen's more famous works, "The Female-Centered Film and the Male-Centered Society," seems to almost anticipate the work of feminist film theorist Laura Mulvey by decades. In this 1936 essay published in Women's Life magazine, Chen parses and explores the complex psychological consequences on female audiences watching imbalanced gendered power dynamics. She is thus quoted (as Zheng Wang translates):

In a male-centered society, politics, the economy, and all the ruling powers are in men's hands. Thus all the laws, morality, customs, and norms are shaped by men's biased positions. Aesthetic views are no exception...Women in such a society have unconsciously conformed to its demands. For instance, using makeup was not originally in women's nature, but in order to cater to the preferences of a male-centered society it has become female nature. This explains why female audiences have similar views toward female stars as that of male audiences. The difference is that the male audience's view expresses the direct preference out of a dominator's psychology, while the female audience's view arises from the psychology of the dominated to unconsciously cater to the preferences of the dominator.

Here, Chen discusses the effects of the male gaze in cinema long before the term had been officially coined by Mulvey in 1975. This gaze would be something that Chen, as a filmmaker, would strive to fight against. She would go on in her own films, and those to which she contributed, to show strong female heroines, and be a key figure in Chinese feminist film development. Chen ends this essay with a provocative revolutionary conclusion:

"Women's pursuit of freedom and equality requires the efforts of all walks of life. If film cannot shoulder the responsibility of guidance but is mistaken as an ideal haven and leads people to escape from reality, we would rather have no film!"

Zheng Wang notes that this ending is meant to be ironic, although it nonetheless makes clear the intensity and earnestness of Chen's feminist and leftist beliefs.

== Film and acting career ==
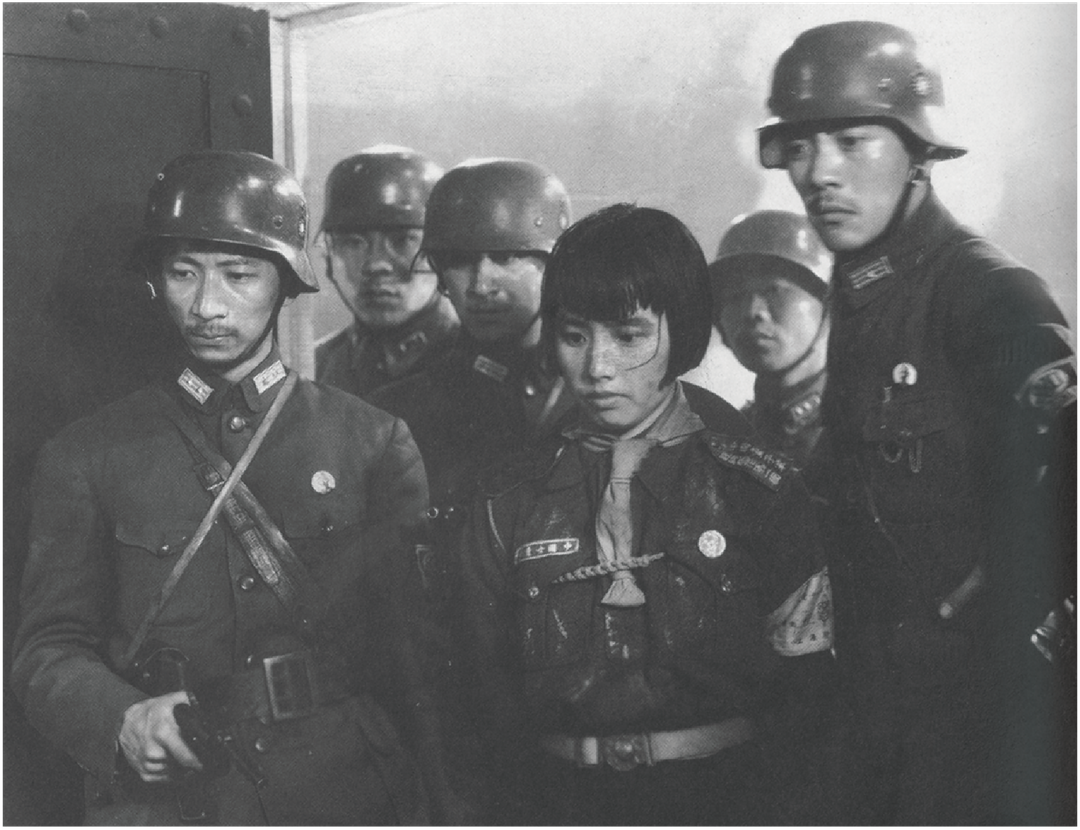
Still from Babai zhuangshi [800 Heroes] (1938)

Though Chen was initially hesitant to work in film due to the sexist treatment of female actresses by the media, she nonetheless felt that film had great potential for feminist activism and leftist revolution. She believed that her participation in the film world could create an affirmative change in the popular media image of Chinese women. Her work engendered a shift in this image, from victim and sexual object to strong heroines and leading protagonists. Chen achieved her first film successes in 1934 and would continue to work in film for the rest of her short life.

=== Film roles ===
Chen appeared in several films over her career as an actress. In 1934, she appeared in Qingchun xian [On Youth] (1934). She held a starring role as Li in 1934 sound film, Taoli jie [Plunder of Peach and Plum] which was known also as The Fate of the Graduates – this is one of China's earliest talking movies. In 1936, she starred alongside fellow political activist Yuan Muzhi, who would one day become her real-life husband, in Unchanged Heart in Life and Death, a revolutionary propaganda film. The film – as many of those in which Chen starred and on which she worked– is as equally entertaining as it is a realist, anti-government film, subtly hiding its revolutionary aspects to avoid Nationalist government's censorship. In 1935, Chen worked on Huishou dangnian [Remembering the Past]. Chen also held a role playing a girl scout in Babai zhuangshi [800 Heroes] (or sometimes translated to 800 Brave Soldiers or 800 Warriors) in 1938.

=== Theatre ===
Chen also acted in several street theatre productions in the 1930s. The left took up public theatre as a way to increase resistance among urban populations, including student voices and movements, especially in Shanghai and Nanjing as these were considered modern cultural cities. As an attractive young woman and rising celebrity, Chen's performances garnered a great amount of media attention – especially in Put Down Your Whip in 1937. As the daughter in this play, Chen "embodied, according to a report in The Shenbao, a new femininity in fulfilling her responsibility as a national citizen." Also in 1937, she starred in Baowei lugouqiao (Protecting Luguo Bridge), an anti-Japanese stage drama. Before Yan'an became a film studio – a transition in which Chen was instrumental – she staged and produced many anti-Japanese plays and dramas here.

=== Animation ===
Chen Bo'er was a pioneer of Chinese animation, and was a major player in the creation and leadership of the Northeast Film Studio and Shanghai Film Studio. Chen directed Huangdi meng (Emperor’s Dream or Dreaming to be an Emperor) in 1947. This film was a satire of Chiang Kai-shek and George Marshall, and painted Kuomintang leader Chiang Kai-shek as a stooge propping up American imperialism. In that same year, she directed the seventeen-episode documentary Minzhu dongbei (The Democratic Northeast).

== Time in Yan'an ==
In 1938, Chen left Shanghai and settled in Yan'an where she would establish her lasting cultural influence. Her time here was one of the important moments of her career, and certainly much of today's literature which engages with Chen's life and work places an emphasis on Yan'an. Because her life was cut short by illness, a majority of it was spent here.

In 1946, Chen managed to convince the Communist government to establish a film studio in the Communist base of Yan'an. Here, she was part of what was known as the Yan'an Film Troupe.

=== Scriptwriting and directing ===
Here, Chen was an incredibly successful female director and screenwriter. Much of Chen's work in Yan'an was in leadership positions, as well as scriptwriting. In 1945, Chen wrote and directed Comrade, You've Taken the Wrong Road. Chen was the scriptwriter for Light Spreads Everywhere, filmed in 1948; earlier, she had written Labour Hero of the Border Area (Communist occupied zone), but this was never filmed.

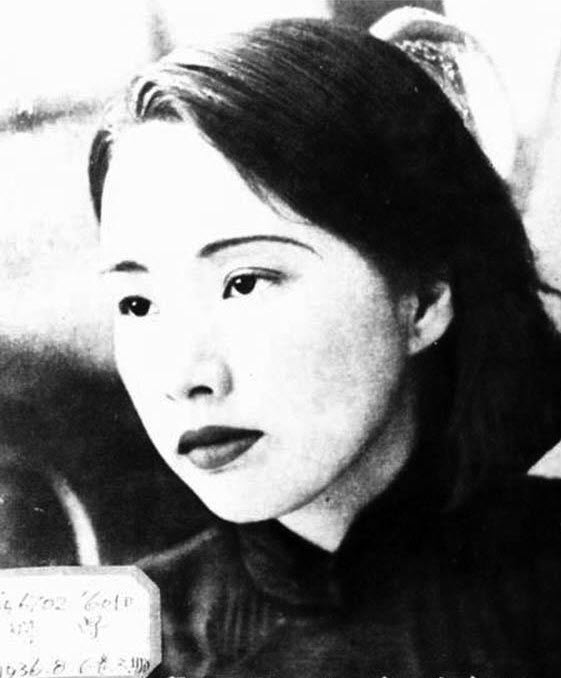
Chen on the cover of Star Bi-Monthly Magazine (1930s)

Chen's directorial debut was Working Hero in the Communist Base (1946), though she was unable to complete the film because of the Civil War.

=== Feminist influence ===
Chen was the first female director wholly supported by the Communist government, fully endorsing her film work and activism.

With this influence of the Communist government's endorsement, Chen was able to make notable strides in feminist and socialist activism through her art-making practices. Directing and producing films and stage performances in Yan'an, Chen arranged her artistic endeavours such that ninety percent of the actors with whom she worked came from working-class backgrounds. This was one of her ways of making sure to center both the lower classes (or peasantry) and women in her feminist artistic practices.

In her work, Chen also encouraged and helped other women artists with directing, screenwriting, and producing films. Though she receives no credits, she helped co-author one of China's strongest feminist propaganda films of the 1940s, Daughters of China. This film was one of the films that eschewed the 'male gaze' – a sexist filmic eye for which Chen held great contempt, as she had made clear in her earlier writings.

It is clear that institutional support had an incredible impact on the history of women's filmmaking in China. Wang Ping, Wang Shaoyan, and Dong Kena were three other women filmmakers in the 1930s and 40s whose cultural contributions to socialist feminist film also began with institutional endorsement. Chen's initial endorsement and hard work allowed for future generations of women directors, such as these, to have successful and culturally significant careers.

=== Mao Zedong's Yan'an talks ===
The Yan'an Talks are remembered for their pedagogical and punitive agenda, wherein Mao Zedong criticized the 'wrong' views of some Communist intellectuals and artists. As Zheng Wang points out, there are certain "flaws in [this] dominant narrative." Chen, as well as many of her revolutionary artist peers, had been working within the political and cultural beliefs for some time before hearing Mao speak: the Yan'an Talks "articulated a vision of cultural revolution that had long been shared among revolutionary artists such as Chen Bo'er." The Talks served a larger purpose of validating the political identity of many artists working in Yan'an already.

Mao's Talks also addressed the workers, peasants, and soldiers as genderless – yet the 'neutral' genderless subject is defaulted as a man. Chen's revolutionary vision of the socialist film of which Mao spoke included women as the workers, peasants, and soldiers, and her films fought against patriarchal, male-centred heroes. Though her beliefs resonated completely with Mao's Talks about revolutionary culture, Chen's vision also added a feminist perspective.

== Other film studios ==
=== Northeast Film Studio ===
After aiding in the transformation of Manchuria Film to the Northeast Film Studio with Yuan Muzhi – which would later move again and become the Changchun Film Studio in spring 1949 – Chen was sent to oversee productions in 1947. In spring 1947, her husband, Yuan Muzhi, was made director of the Northeast Film Studio while Chen was made its Party secretary.

Her work at the studio had a large impact on the representation of women. In 1950, three of the fifteen films produced by the Northeast Film Studio had strong revolutionary female heroines, and five had female leads.

==== Animation Department ====
Chen wrote screenplays and oversaw, directed, and produced animations. Animations at this time consisted, as Te Wei explained in a 2001 interview, of paper-cut, paper-folded, and puppet animation, as well as hand-drawn animation in the style of Disney's Fantasia.

Because of Chen's national pride, she saw to it that the animations had definitively Chinese characteristics. Thus, she made sure the team working on Emperor's Dream (1937) used the Peking style of opera. Chen also gave Mochinaga Tadahito – a Japanese animator who had a huge impact on Chinese animation – his Chinese name. This was customary so that the credits on films had no Japanese names, which Chinese audiences could find offensive. She named him Fang Ming, and gave his wife Ayako the name Li Guang; together, these translate to bright light, which "signifi[ed Chen's] hope that the future and direction of Chinese animation would be very bright."

Chen also directed the first documentary of socialist China, Minzhu dongbei (The Democratic Northeast). This was an incredibly influential seventeen-part film, and the animation studio animated the battlefield scenes.

Chen, who saw a continued future for animation, decided to establish a permanent animation studio within the department and put animator Te Wei in charge.

In late 1949, the animation department was moved to the Shanghai Film Studio.

=== Central Film Bureau ===
In summer 1949, Chen was sent to Beijing to be the art director for the Central Film Bureau of which her husband was also made head. When there were discussions here about whether Daughters of China was a qualified film with enough artistic quality to be sent to Karlovy Vary International Film Festival, Chen threatened to resign. Because of her intense defence of the film, it succeeded in being chosen for the film festival.

=== Beijing Film Academy ===
In Beijing in 1950, Chen established the Beijing Performing Art Research Institute which would later become the Beijing Film Academy – the first national film school in China.

== Personal life ==
In 1931, Chen and Ren Posheng were married in Hong Kong.

Together Chen and Ren had two sons, though one of her children died suddenly and tragically. In his biography of Chen, Wang Yongfang explains that the one year-old died of a sudden illness. However, in an interview with professor Zheng Wang – who writes on Chen Bo'er extensively in her thorough chapter "Chen Bo'er and the Feminist Paradigm of Socialist Film" – Wang Yongfang reveals that the death was infanticide. In 1935, Ren beat the baby to death. After this incident, Chen hired a nanny to take care of her other son, and also began to take him with her to her busy work events rather than leave him with his father. Due to this tragedy, Ren became estranged from Chen. He was also estranged from her because of his involvement in the CCP, where he was unable to communicate with her for long periods of time.

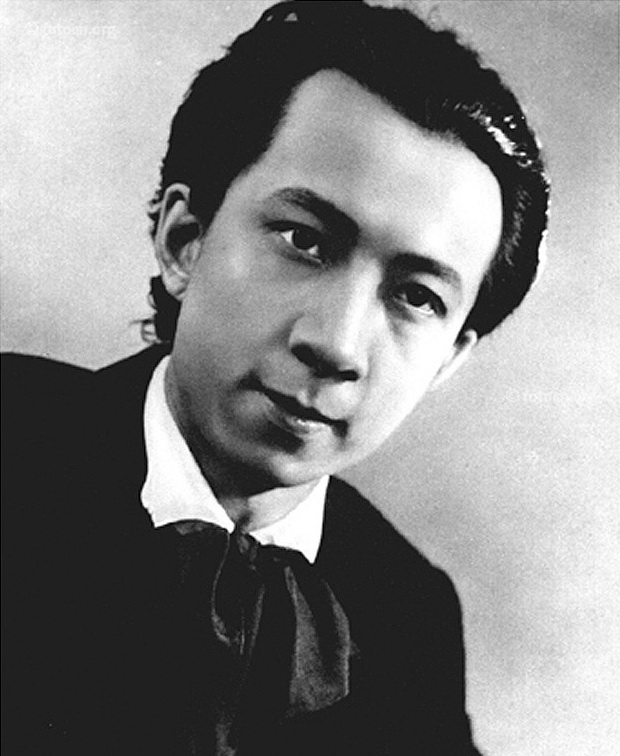
Yuan Muzhi, revolutionary and Chen Bo'er's husband

Chen found out in 1946 that Ren had remarried, and in 1947, Chen married her activism and film peer and old friend – the filmmaker, leftist revolutionary, and actor Yuan Muzhi. They had worked on several films together before being married in Harbin. After the revolution, in 1949 when the People's Republic of China was founded, the couple played important roles in both the ministry of Culture as well as the Northeast Film Studio.

=== Reception and fame ===
During her life, Chen was known as a benevolent educator, supporter, and role model for young women and leftist youth, and was very kind. Famous May Fourth writer Ding Ling, who lived in Yan'an for a period of time, spoke to her popularity (as translated by Zheng Wang):

"She was in poor health, and yet her meals came from the big pot shared with all...Nevertheless, she took it naturally and joyfully. I never heard anybody say that Chen Bo'er complained about the life there. That was very rare among artists or intellectuals who had come to Yan'an with some social status."

Chen was often praised by those who knew her personally, as well as by journalists and her film peers. Lu Ming called her "the soul of Xingshan" and "a flawless person" in interviews with Zheng Wang. There was no gossip about her in any institution where she worked.

Chen was dedicated to educating others wherever she worked. She often allowed new animators, such as Japanese animator Mochinaga Tadahito, to join and observe her teams so that they could improve their work. Chen was both popular and loved throughout her influential lifetime.

== Death and legacy ==
Chen Bo'er suffered from an undiagnosed heart disease. Living in a Loessal cave in the "desolate rural perimeter" of Yan'an, Chen had little medical attention. She often fainted while working, but would get up quickly and continue. In fact, Chen was so strongly devoted to her work both as an activist and filmmaker that in 1951 she stopped off in Shanghai while on a work trip back from Guangzhou to discuss critiques of the film The Life of Wu Xun, despite being obviously weak and tired. Only hours after the meeting she was hospitalized and died from heart failure.

In her death, Chen's key contributions to China's film industry and leftist revolution did not mask or overshadow her feminist stance and strides in women's liberation. Many mourned her death as a major "loss to our party, people, and women."

Because of her major cultural impact, it is striking to note that Chen Bo'er's life story has been largely erased from history. There is little literature about her specifically and her life is given little to no importance in film studies, both in China and elsewhere. Zheng Wang argues that this is "emblematic of the erasure of the socialist feminist cultural front." Other scholars point to the emphasis on the cooperative and communal nature of the projects on which she worked. In general, however, scholars who have written on Chen Bo'er agree that film history of the period in which Chen worked focuses on men; other female filmmakers alongside Chen Bo'er, such as Tang Cheng, Lin Wenxiao, and Duan Xiaoxuan, have garnered significantly less recognition in recent years.
