= Changchun Film Studio =

Chinese film production company

Changchun Film Studio Group Corporation
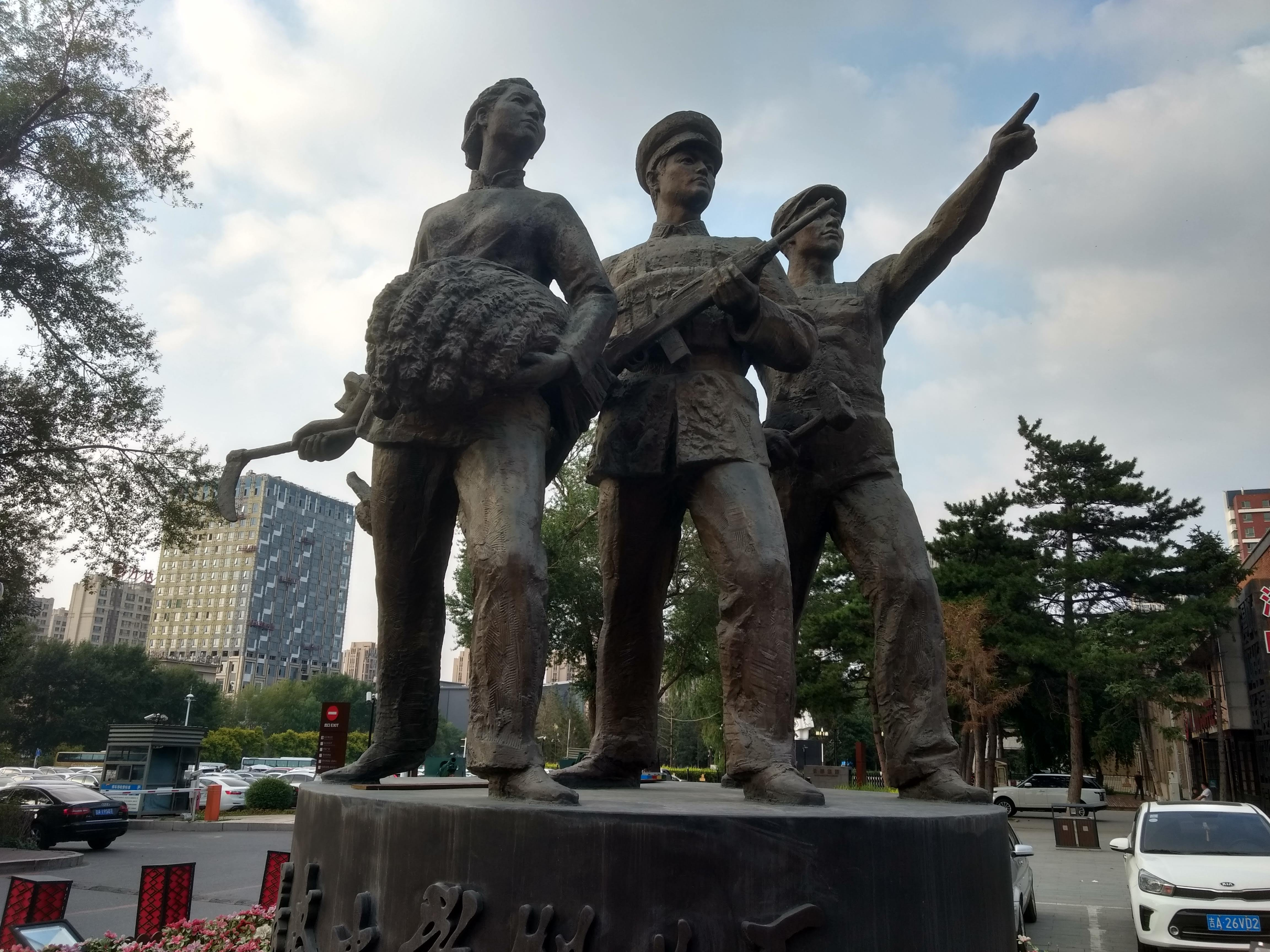

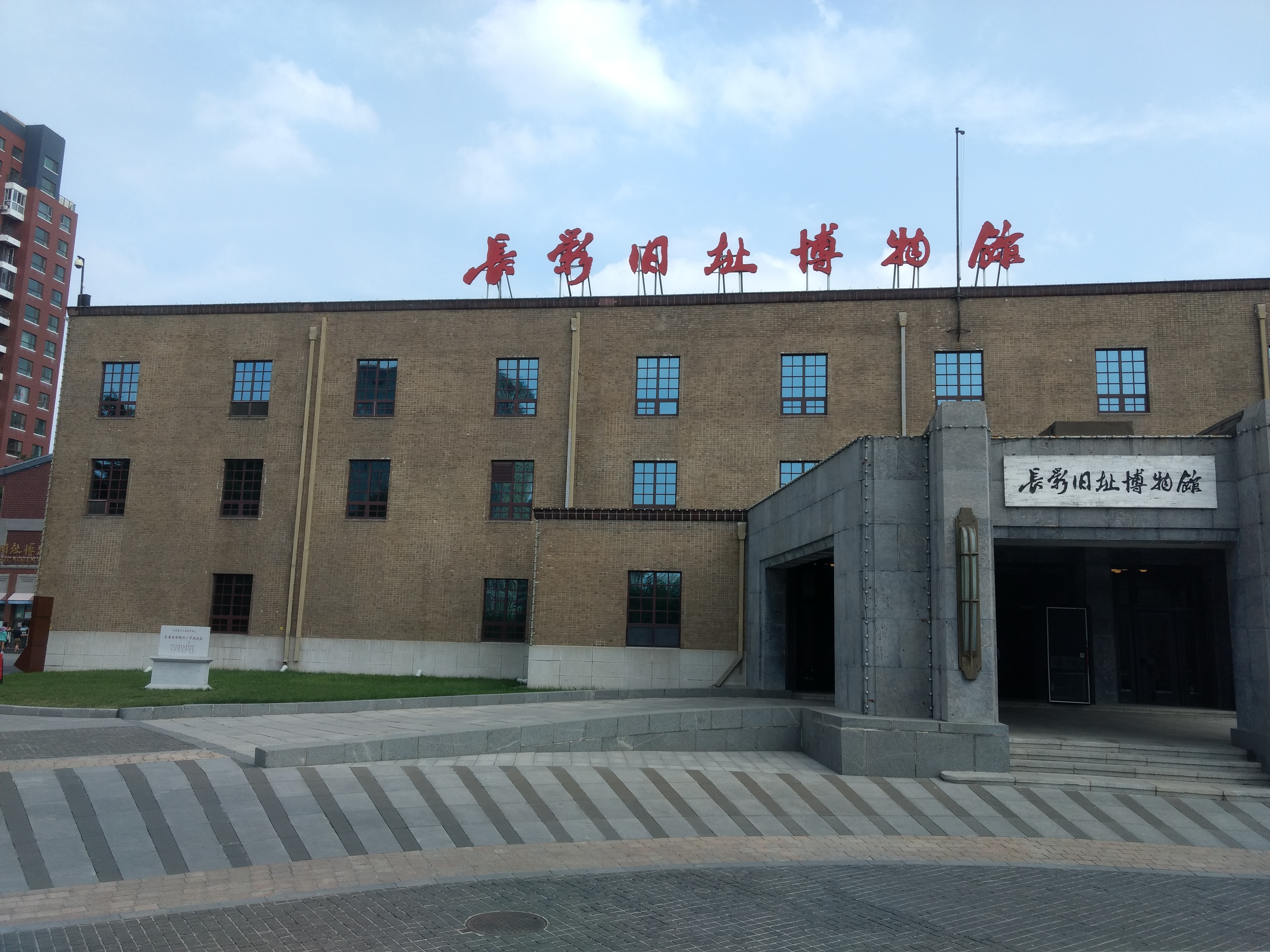
- Gate of Changchun Film Studio
- Type: State-owned enterprise
- Industry: film production, documentary
- Founded: 1950
- Founder: Chinese Communist Party
- Headquarters: Changchun, Jilin, China
- Products: films, movies, TV series
- Number of employees: 3000
- Website: cfs-cn.com

Changchun Film Studio Group Corporation (Chinese: 长春电影集团公司) is a Chinese film production company in Changchun. It is one of the studios transitioned from the 1940s, and has been considered one of the cornerstones of the Chinese film industry.

== Early history ==
The surrender of Japan in World War II caused the Manchukuo Film Association to disband in 1946. The parts that were sanctioned by the Chinese government would integrate with the Yan'an Film Studio (延安电影制片厂) and the Northeast Film Studio. The War of Liberation would break out in 1949 forcing the studio to move to Changchun. By 1950 it was considered founded, and by 1955 the Northeast Film Studio technically no longer existed, since China's Ministry of Culture would officially rename the newly combined entity as "Changchun Film Studio". Under the new name, it would also become the first registered film factory under the People's Republic of China.

After the Third Plenary Session of the 11th Communist Party Conference in December 1978, the notions of class struggle and continuous revolution were abandoned. Deng Xiaoping allowed the development of more creative ideas under the slogan "emancipation of the mind". Film makers felt they could at least make films that entertained as long as they did not openly declare their intention to make commercialized movies.

The group is also the founder and host of the annual China Changchun Film Festival since 1992. By 1998, the studio would begin a restructure process including the retirement of 1000 employees along with transitioning from a studio to corporate structure.

== Present ==
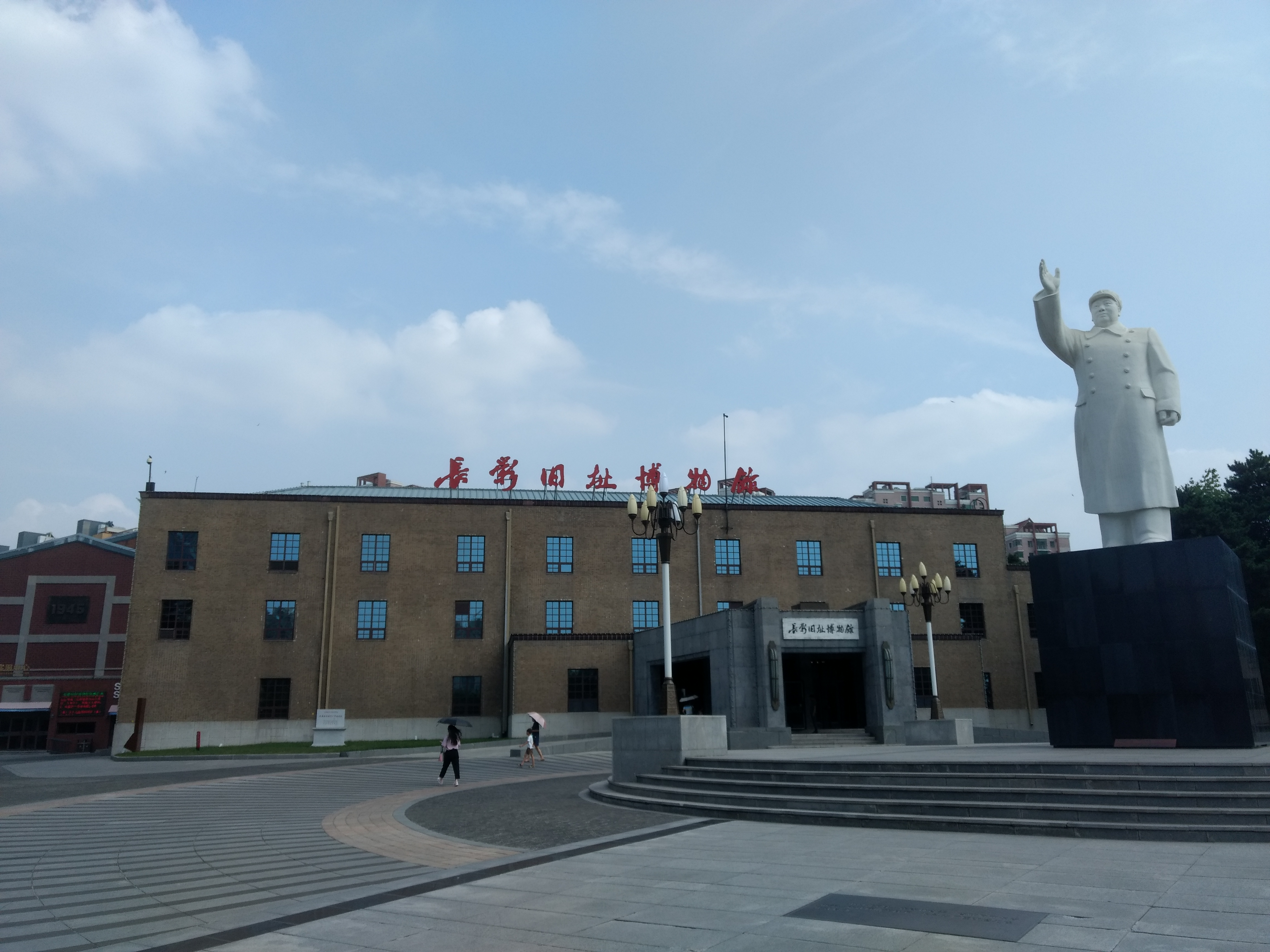
Former Site Museum Of Changchun Film Studio.

Today the Changchun Film Group Corporation has one of the largest film production base in China. The production centers remain in northeastern Jilin province. In 2003 the company became a shareholder of Huaxia Film Distribution, which became an importer of foreign films. Prior to the founding of this distribution corp, the state-run competitor China Film Group Corp. had a near monopoly control on all foreign films going into the country.

Also in 2003, an announcement was made with an initial investment of about US $120 million to begin the first phase of the construction of the "Changchun Film Theme Park" (长春影城主题公园) under the Ideattack company. The design is modeled after Hollywood's Universal Studios, covering an area of 1 million square meters; it is the first park of its kind in China integrating film entertainment with film tourism. The construction is divided into three stages, and the investment has grown to 1.5 billion RMB (about US $193 million). The movie world section of the park was opened to tourists on a trial basis in September and October 2005 at a price of 128 yuan (US $15) per entry. The Changchun government estimated the center would hopefully draw in at least 1.5 million people a year in the future from home and abroad, making US $27.1 million.

== Productions ==
- Daughter of the Party (1958)
