= Eight Hundred Heroes =

1977 film

- Film poster
- Directed by: Ting Shan-hsi
- Written by: Ting Shan-hsi
- Produced by: Mei Chang-Ling; Ming Chi
- Starring: Ko Chun-hsiung; Hsu Feng; Brigitte Lin; Chin Han
- Cinematography: Lin Wenjin
- Edited by: Wang Chin-Chen
- Music by: Huang Mao-Shan
- Production company: Central Motion Picture Corporation
- Release date: 10 July 1975 (Taiwan)
- Running time: 113 minutes
- Country: Taiwan
- Language: Mandarin

Eight Hundred Heroes (traditional Chinese: 八百壯士; simplified Chinese: 八百壮士; pinyin: Bābǎi zhuàngshì) is a 1975 Taiwanese historical war drama film directed by Ting Shan-hsi about the Defense of Sihang Warehouse in 1937 Shanghai, China. The film was selected as the Taiwanese entry for the Best Foreign Language Film at the 49th Academy Awards, but was not accepted as a nominee.

== Cast ==
- Ko Chun-hsiung as Lieutenant Colonel Xie Jinyuan
- Brigitte Lin as Yang Huimin
- Hsu Feng as Ling Weicheng, Xie's wife
- Sylvia Chang as Li Cini, a girl guide
- Chin Han as Major Shangguan Zhibiao
- Carter Wong
- Chin Han
- Chan Hung-lit
- Peter Yang
- Sihung Lung

== See also ==
- List of submissions to the 49th Academy Awards for Best Foreign Language Film
- List of Taiwanese submissions for the Academy Award for Best Foreign Language Film
