= List of Chinese films of the 1940s =

This is a list of films produced in the Republican period and initial Communist period of China ordered by year of release in the 1940s.

For an alphabetical listing of Chinese films see Category:Chinese films.

== 1940 ==
Title	Chinese Title	Director	Actors	Genre	Notability
Adventures of the Chinese Tarzan	中國泰山歷險記	Wang Cilong	Lai Cheuk-Cheuk	Adventure/Romance	Adapted from Tarzan of the Apes
The Amorous History of Su San	蘇三艷史	Wu Cun	Zhou Xuan	Drama	
Baptism by Fire	火的洗禮	Sun Yu	Zhang Ruifang, He Weiling	War	
City of Darkness	黑天堂	Wu Cun	Zhou Xuan, Gong Jianong	Drama	
Confucius	孔夫子	Fei Mu	Tang Huaiqiu	Biographical/Historical	
The Country Girl	鄉下大姑娘	Wang Yin	Yuan Meiyun	Drama	
Dong Xiaowan	董小宛	Zhang Shichuan, Zheng Xiaoqiu	Zhou Xuan, Shu Shi		Alternate title: The Story of Dong Xiaowan
Drizzling Rain	瀟湘秋雨	Zhang Shankun, Bu Wancang	Chen Yunshang, Mei Xi	Drama	
The Emerald Hairpin	碧玉簪	Bu Wancang	Chen Yunshang	Romance	Based on a Yue opera
Flower Girl	花魁女	Wu Yonggang	Chen Yen-yen, Liu Qiong	Romance/Costume	
The Gardener and the Lady		Wang Cilong	Lu Ming, Wang Yin	Romance	Based on a folk legend
Ge Neniang	葛嫩娘	Chen Yiqing	Gu Lanjun, Mei Xi	Historical/Drama	Alternate title: Grudges at the End of the Ming
Guan Yin, a Bodhisattva	觀世音	Yan Youxiang	Zhang Cuihong		
Hongxian Steals the Chest	紅線盜盒	Li Pingqian	Gu Lanjun	Historical/Action	
Invisible Heroine	隱身女俠	Wu Wenchao	Li Lihua		
Legend of the Sui Dynasty	隨宮春色	Yang Xiaozhong	Chen Yen-yen, Liu Qiong	Historical/Romance	
Li Xiangjun	李香君	Wu Cun	Gu Lanjun	Drama	Based on The Peach Blossom Fan
Liang Shanbo and Zhu Yingtai	梁山伯與祝英台	Yueh Feng	Zhang Cuihong, Gu Yelu	Romance/Costume	Based on the Butterfly Lovers
Light of East Asia	東亞之光	He Feiguang		War	
Living Buddha Ji Gong	濟公活佛	Zheng Xiaoqiu	You Guangzhao	Biographical	
Meng Lijun	孟麗君	Zhang Shichuan	Zhou Xuan, Shu Shi	Romance/Costume	Alternate title: Magnificent Relationship (華麗緣)
The Pearl Pagoda	珍珠塔	Fang Peilin	Li Hong, Gu Yelu	Romance	Sound remake of the 1926 silent of the same title
The Perfect Beauty	絕代佳人	Wang Cilong	Hu Die	Biographical/Historical	Last days of the Ming dynasty, focusing on the role played by famous beauty Chen Yuanyuan; Alternate title: Chen Yuanyuan the Beauty
Powder and Sword	紅粉金戈	Wu Yonggang	Wang Xichun, Shu Shi	Historical/Action	
Princess Snow White	白雪公主	Wu Yonggang	Chen Juanjuan	Fantasy	Live-action adaptation of the 1937 Disney film Alternate title: China Princess Snow White (中國白雪公主)
Qin Liangyu	秦良玉	Bu Wancang	Chen Yunshang	Biographical/Historical	Based on the life and career of female general Qin Liangyu
Qin Xianglian	秦香蓮	Wen Yimin	Zhang Cuihong, Wang Cilong	Crime	Non-musical adaptation of Chen Shimei, one of the cases of Bao Zheng
Romance of the Western Chamber	西廂記	Zhang Shichuan	Zhou Xuan		Musical remake of the 1927 silent film of the same title
Songstresses		Zhang Shichuan	Zhou Manhua	Romance	Adapted from a novel by Zhang Henshui
Storm on the Border	塞上風雲	Ying Yunwei	Li Lili, Shu Xiuwen	War	First film to show Chinese minority people joining the anti-Japanese resistance
Su Wu Herds the Sheep	蘇武牧羊	Bu Wancang	Chen Yunshang, Mei Xi	Biographical/Historical	The story of Han dynasty diplomat Su Wu
Tempest Over Taihang Mountain	風雪太行山	He Mengfu	Xie Tian	War	Alternate title: Struggle on Taihang Mountain
The Vast Sky	長空萬裡	Sun Yu	Gao Zhanfei, Bai Yang, Jin Yan, Wang Renmei	War	"National Defense" film made in unoccupied West China. Alternate English title: Wings of China
The Wandering Songstress	天涯歌女	Wu Cun	Zhou Xuan	Drama	
Yan Xijiao	閻惜嬌	Yueh Feng	Mei Xi, Diao Banhua		Based on a chapter in Water Margin
Yanmen Pass	雁門關	Fang Peilin	Yuan Meiyun, Mei Xi	Historical/War	
Youth of China	青年中國	Su Yi	Tao Jin, Bai Yang	War	
Yue Fei, a National Hero	岳飛精忠報國	Wu Yonggang	Liu Qiong	Historical/War	Story of the Song dynasty general Yue Fei; Alternate Chinese titles: 尽忠報國, 精忠報國

== 1941 ==
Title	Chinese Title	Director	Actors	Genre	Notability
A Girl in Wartime	亂世佳人	Zhang Shankun	Chen Yunshang, Liu Qiong	Historical/War	
Between Couples	夫婦之道	Zhang Shichuan, Zheng Xiaoqiu	Zhou Manhua	Drama	
The Brother and His Half Sister	碧海青天	Yueh Feng	Tong Yuejuan, Gu Yelu		
Charlie Chan Smashes an Evil Plot	陳查禮大破隱身術	Xu Xinfu	Xu Xinyuan, Gu Meijun, Gong Qiuxia	Mystery	A Charlie Chan mystery. Alternate title: Charlie Chan Uncovers the Secrets
Die for Love	返魂香	Zhu Shilin	Ying Yin	War/Romance	
The End of Life	地老天荒	Shu Shi	Bai Hong, Murong Wan'er	Drama	
Family	家	Bu Wancang, Li Pingqian		Drama	Adaptation of Ba Jin's novel
Heartbroken	斷腸花	Wang Yin	Yuan Meiyun, Liu Qiong	Romance/War	
Life in the Orphan Island	孤島春秋	Wu Cun	Gong Jianong, Murong Wan'er, Bai Hong		
Princess Biluo	碧蘿公主	Zhu Shilin	Wang Xichun		
Princess Iron Fan	鐵扇公主	Wan brothers		Animation	First Chinese animated feature film
Robber in Black	黑衣盜	Chen Huanwen	Shangguan Yunzhu	Mystery	
Scenes of Turbulent Times	亂世風光	Wu Renzhi	Shi Hui, Han Fei	Drama	
Spring Breezes Recall a Dream	春風回夢記	Yueh Feng	Tong Yuejuan, Gu Yelu	Romance	

== 1942 ==
Title	Chinese Title	Director	Actors	Genre	Notability
A Girl's Secrets	小姐的秘密	Wen Yimin	Lu Luming	Drama	
A Joyful Night	一夜銷魂	Wen Yimin	Lu Luming, Sun Min	Drama	
A Tragic Marriage	淚洒相思地	Sun Min	Lu Luming, Shangguan Yunzhu	Tragedy	
College Students	學府風光	Wu Wenchao	Zhang Cuiying, Han Lan'gen	Comedy	
Compassion		Various	Ensemble cast	Anthology	Collection of 11 short stories illustrating universal brotherhood
Enemies Behind Every Bush		Zhu Shilin	Yan Jun, Chen Qi	Drama	
The Fallen Peony		Bu Wancang	Chen Yunshang, Gu Eryi	Drama	
Fallen Plum Blossoms	梅花落	Tu Guangqi	Wang Xichun, He Bin	Drama	Remake of the 1927 silent film of the same title. Released in two parts.
Grand Hotel	大飯店	Mei Qi	Lu Luming, Sun Min	Drama	Remake of the 1932 American film of the same title
The Happy Years	歡樂年年	Yang Xiaozhong	Chen Yunshang, Mei Xi		
Rainy Night on Cold Mountain		Ma-Xu Weibang	Li Lihua, Huang He	Adventure	
Romance in Spring	春水情波	Huang Han	Hu Feng, Ouyang Sha-fei	Drama	Remake of the 1933 film of the same title
Roses Are Blooming Everywhere		Fang Peilin	Gong Qiuxia, Gu Yelu	Romance	
Second Sight	重見光明	Bu Wancang	Chen Yunshang, Gu Yelu	Drama	
She Lost Her Job	玉碎珠圓	Zheng Xiaoqiu	Bai Hong, Han Fei		
The Standard Wife	標准夫人	Bu Wancang	Chen Yen-yen, Mei Xi	Drama	Alternate title: Repentance (懺悔)
The Strange Lady	奇女子	Wen Yimin	Li Lihua, Lu Luming, Sun Min	Drama	
Two Generations of Women		Bu Wancang	Gu Lanjun, Wang Danfeng		
Wedding Night	洞房花燈夜	Zhu Shilin	Chen Yen-yen, Liu Qiong	Drama	

== 1943 ==
Title	Chinese Titles	Director	Actors	Genre	Notability
Ask for Help		Zhu Shilin	Tu Guangqi, Zhou Manhua	Comedy	
Daughter of the Fisherman		Bu Wancang	Zhou Xuan	Romance	Yu Jia Nu
Eternity	萬世流芳	Bu Wancang, Ma-Xu Weibang	Chen Yunchang	Drama	Controversial film on the Opium War, produced under the Japanese occupation
A Japanese Spy	日本間諜	Yuan Congmei	Luo Jun, Feng Fei, many others	Drama	Adaptation of Amleto Vespa's Secret Agent of Japan. Made in China's wartime capital of Chungking.

== 1944 ==
Title	Chinese Title	Director	Actors	Genre	Notability
A Brave Man Can Make Mountains and Rivers Brave	氣壯山河	He Feiguang	Li Lili, Wang Hao	War	Made in China's wartime capital of Chungking
Dream of the Red Chamber		Bu Wancang	Zhou Xuan	Drama	Adaptation of the classic Chinese novel

== 1945 ==
Title	Chinese Title	Director	Actors	Genre	Notability
Bloodshed on an Oriental Cherry	血濺櫻花	He Feiguang	Li Lili	War	
My Love, My Homeland	還我故鄉	Shi Dongshan	Tao Jin, Zhao Shuyin	War	
Song for the Police	警魂歌	Tang Xiaodan	Wang Hao, Zong You; Kang Jian		Alternate Chinese title: 敢死警備隊

== 1946 ==
Title	Chinese Title	Director	Actors	Genre	Notability
Flying Orioles	鶯飛人間	Fang Peilin	Ouyang Feiying, Chen Tianguo, Yan Su		
The Holy City	聖城記	Shen Fu	Bai Yang, Xie Tian, Qi Heng		
The Iron Man	鐵骨冰心	Pei Chong	Liu Qiong, Qian Shanzhu		
The Loyal Family	忠義之家	Wu Yonggang	Liu Qiong, Qin Yi		
Sparks of the Nation	民族的火花	Yang Xiaozhong	Wang Danfeng, Yan Hua		
Spy Number One	天字第一號	Tu Guangqi	Ouyang Feiying, He Bin, Zhou Chu		

== 1947 ==
Title	Chinese Title	Director	Actors	Genre	Notability
Along the Sungari River	鬆花江上	Jin Shan	Zhang Ruifang, Wang Renlu	War	
Dream in Paradise	天堂春夢	Tang Xiaodan	Shangguan Yunzhu	Drama	
Eight Thousand Li of Cloud and Moon	八千里路雲和月	Shi Dongshan	Bai Yang	Drama	
Emperor's Dream				Animation	
Far Away Love	遙遠的愛	Chen Liting	Zhao Dan, Qin Yi, Wu Yin	Drama	
Long Live the Missus!	太太萬歲	Sang Hu	Shi Hui, Shangguan Yunzhu	Romantic Comedy	
Night Inn	夜店	Huang Zuolin	Zhou Xuan, Wei Wei	Drama	Adaptation of Maxim Gorky's The Lower Depths
Phony Phoenixes	假鳳虛凰	Huang Zuolin	Shi Hui, Li Lihua, Lu Shan	Comedy	
Rhapsody of Happiness	幸福狂想曲	Chen Liting	Zhao Dan, Huang Zongying	Drama	Written by Chen Baichen
The Spring River Flows East	一江春水向東流	Zheng Junli, Cai Chusheng	Bai Yang, Tao Jin, Shu Xiuwen, Shangguan Yunzhu	Drama	

== 1948 ==
Title	Chinese Title	Director	Actors	Genre	Notability
Go After an Easy Prey	瓮中捉鳖	Fang Ming		Animation	North East Film Studio
Myriad of Lights	萬家燈火	Shen Fu	Shangguan Yunzhu, Lan Ma, Wu Yin	Drama	
A Wedding in the Dream	生死恨	Fei Mu	Mei Lanfang	Musical/Opera	First Chinese color film
Spring in a Small Town	小城之春	Fei Mu	Wei Wei, Li Wei	Romantic Drama	Named the greatest Chinese language film made by the Hong Kong Film Awards

== 1949 ==
Title	Chinese Title	Director	Actors	Genre	Notability
Bridge	橋	Wang Bin		War	First post-revolution Chinese film
Crows and Sparrows	烏鴉與麻雀	Zheng Junli	Zhao Dan, Shangguan Yunzhu, Sun Daolin	Drama	Post-revolution Chinese film
Daughters of China	中華女兒	Ling Zifeng; Zhai Qiang		War	Post-revolution Chinese film
Mother	母親	Shi Hui	Qin Yi	Drama	
Orphan on the Streets	三毛流浪記	Zhao Ming, Yan Gong	Wang Longji, Lin Zhen	Drama	Kunlun Film Company production, also known as The Winter of Three Hairs. Post-revolution Chinese film
Ai le zhongnian (Sorrows and Joys of Middle Age)	哀樂中年	Sang Hu	Shi Hui	Drama	
Women Side by Side	麗人行	Chen Liting	Sha Li, Huang Zongying, Shangguan Yunzhu	Drama	Also known as Three Women and Female Fighter

== Mainland Chinese film production totals ==
Year	Total Films
1940	59
1941	108
1942	33
1943	1
1944	1
1945	3
1946	6
1947	39
1948	75
1949	44

== See also ==
- Cinema of China
- Best 100 Chinese Motion Pictures as chosen by the 24th Hong Kong Film Awards

== Sources ==
- 中国影片大典 Encyclopaedia of Chinese Films. 1931-1949.9, 故事片·戏曲片. (2005). Zhong guo ying pian da dian: 1931-1949.9. Beijing: 中国电影出版社 China Movie Publishing House. ISBN 7-106-02414-7
- 中国影片大典 Encyclopaedia of Chinese Films. 1949.10-1976, 故事片·戏曲片. (2001). Zhong guo ying pian da dian: 1949.10-1976. Beijing: 中国电影出版社 China Movie Publishing House. ISBN 7-106-01508-3
