= Shangguan Yunzhu =

Chinese actress active from the 1940s to the 1960s

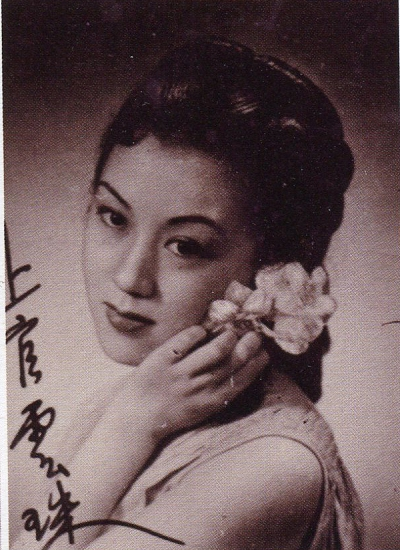
- Autographed photo, taken in the 1940s
- Born: Wei Junluo (Chinese: 韋均犖); 2 March 1920; Jiangyin, Jiangsu, Republic of China
- Died: 23 November 1968 (aged 48); Shanghai, China
- Occupation: Actress
- Spouses: Zhang Dayan (m. 1936; div. 1943); Yao Ke (m. 1943; div. 1944); Cheng Shuyao (m. 1951; div. 1953)
- Children: Zhang Qijian (son); Yao Yao (daughter); Wei Ran (son)

Chinese name
- Traditional Chinese: 上官雲珠
- Simplified Chinese: 上官云珠
Transcriptions
Standard Mandarin
- Hanyu Pinyin: Shàngguān Yúnzhū
- Wade–Giles: Shang-kuan Yün-chu

Shangguan Yunzhu (Chinese: 上官雲珠; Wade–Giles: Shang-kuan Yün-chu; 2 March 1920 – 23 November 1968) was a Chinese actress active from the 1940s to the 1960s. She was considered one of the most talented and versatile actresses in China, and was named one of the 100 best actors of the 100 years of Chinese cinema in 2005.

Born Wei Junluo, she fled to Shanghai when her hometown Jiangyin was attacked by the Japanese during the Second Sino-Japanese War. In Shanghai she became a drama and film actress, and her career took off after the end of the war. She starred in several prominent leftist films such as Spring River Flows East, Crows and Sparrows, and Women Side by Side. After the Communist victory in mainland China in 1949, her career was set back when her husband was embroiled in the anti-capitalist Five-anti Campaign, but she later portrayed a wide variety of characters in many films.

Shangguan was married three times and had three children, but all her marriages ended in divorce. She was said to have had an affair with Mao Zedong, for which she was severely persecuted by the followers of Mao's wife Jiang Qing during the Cultural Revolution, leading to her suicide in November 1968.

== Early life ==
Wei Junluo (Chinese: 韋均犖) was born in 1920 in the town of Changjing (长泾) in Jiangyin, Jiangsu, Republic of China. She also used the name Wei Yajun (韋亞君). She was the fifth and youngest child of her parents. In 1936 she married Zhang Dayan (张大炎), an art teacher and a friend of her brother's, and soon gave birth to a son named Zhang Qijian (张其坚) at the age of 17.

After the outbreak of the Second Sino-Japanese War, the invading Japanese army attacked Jiangyin in November 1937, killing one of Wei's sisters in a bombing raid. She fled to Shanghai with her family.

== 1940s ==
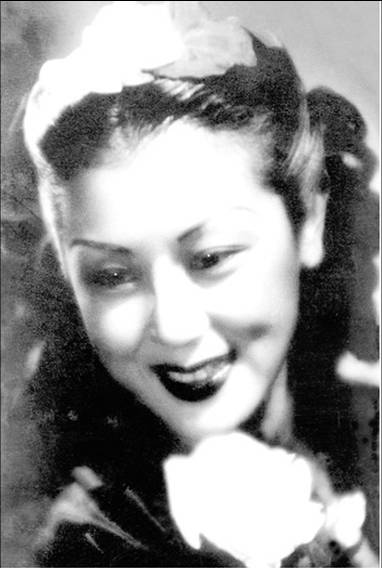
Shangguan in the 1940s

In Shanghai Wei found work at a photo studio owned by He Zuomin, a photographer for the Mingxing Film Company. Influenced by the studio's many customers from the film industry, she became fascinated with acting. In 1940 she enrolled in a drama school and was employed by the Xinhua Film Company after graduation. She adopted the name Shangguan Yunzhu suggested by the influential director Bu Wancang. After successfully playing the female lead in Cao Yu's stage play Thunderstorm, Shangguan joined the Yihua Company and made her film debut in Fallen Rose in 1941.

In 1942 Shangguan joined the Tianfeng Drama Society, where she met the playwright Yao Ke (姚克). The next year Shangguan divorced Zhang Dayan and married Yao. In August 1944 she gave birth to a daughter named Yao Yao (姚姚). However, her new marriage was short-lived due to Yao's infidelity, and the couple divorced before their daughter turned two. Shangguan subsequently had a brief relationship with the actor Lan Ma (蓝马).

In the post-war period, Shangguan Yunzhu played her first lead roles in Dream in Paradise directed by Tang Xiaodan and Long Live the Missus! directed by Sang Hu. She then starred in several leftist films including Spring River Flows East (1947, directors Cai Chusheng and Zheng Junli), Myriad of Lights (1948, director Shen Fu), Crows and Sparrows (1949, director Zheng Junli), and Women Side by Side (1949, director Chen Liting). Her masterful performances in these popular films brought her great fame and critical acclaim.

== After 1949 ==
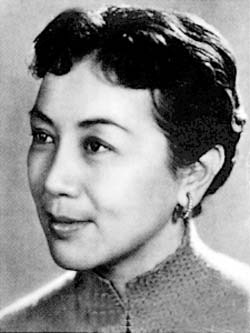
Shangguan's new image in the Communist era

After Mao Zedong's communists won the Chinese Civil War and established the People's Republic of China in 1949, Shangguan Yunzhu continued her acting career under the new government. In 1951 she married her third husband Cheng Shuyao (程述尧), manager of Shanghai's Lyceum Theatre. She gave birth to a son named Wei Ran (韦然). However, Cheng Shuyao was soon embroiled in the Five-anti Campaign, a political campaign launched by Mao against the capitalist class in 1952. He was accused of embezzlement and confessed to the charges under pressure. Shangguan decided to divorce Cheng; their marriage lasted less than two years. She later had another relationship with the director He Lu (贺路).

Affected by her association with Cheng Shuyao, Shangguan did not play any major role for several years. This changed in 1955, when she starred in the film Storm on the Southern Island. Director Bai Chen (白沉) chose her to play the leading role as a heroic nurse, a far cry from her traditional roles of socialites and rich wives. She adjusted to her new role well, and portrayed a wide variety of characters in many films including It's My Day Off (1959), Spring Comes to the Withered Tree (1961, director Zheng Junli), Early Spring in February (1963, director Xie Tieli), and Stage Sisters (1965, director Xie Jin). She was recognized as one of the most talented and versatile actresses in China.

== Relationship with Mao ==
Shangguan was said to have had an intimate relationship with Mao Zedong. On 10 January 1956, Shangguan and Mao had a private meeting set up by Shanghai mayor Chen Yi, at which Mao said he was a fan of hers. Mao was said to have requested to meet her "in private" many times.

== Death ==
In 1966 Shangguan was diagnosed with breast cancer and had a successful surgery. However, only two months later it was found that she also had cancer in her brain and had to undergo another major operation.

At the same time, the Cultural Revolution was underway. Two films Shangguan had appeared in, Early Spring in February and Two Stage Sisters, had been denounced as "huge poisonous weeds". She was also under severe persecution for her alleged affair with Mao. She was badly beaten by followers of Mao's wife Jiang Qing, who gave her an ultimatum to confess her relationship with Mao. At 3 a.m. on 23 November 1968, Shangguan Yunzhu jumped to her death from her apartment.

== Biographies and museum ==
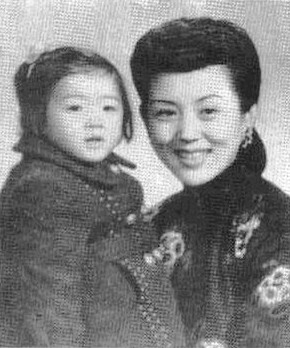
Shangguan with daughter Yao Yao in the late 1940s

Several biographies have been published in Chinese about Shangguan Yunzhu's life:

- Chen Danyan, Shanghai Beauty (上海的红颜遗事) (2000) – Biographical account of Shangguan and her daughter Yao Yao, who was killed in a traffic accident in 1975.
- Wei Xiangtao, Grieving for a movie star: a biography of Shangguan Yunzhu (1986).
- Chen Fuguan (陈复官), Shangguan Yunzhu.

In 2007, her childhood home in Changjing, Jiangyin was opened to the public as the Shangguan Yunzhu Museum.

== Selected filmography ==
- 1941 Fallen Rose (dirs. Wu Wenchao and Wen Yimin)
- 1947 Dream in Paradise (dir. Tang Xiaodan)
- 1947 Long Live the Missus! (dir. Sang Hu)
- 1947 Spring River Flows East (dirs. Cai Chusheng and Zheng Junli)
- 1948 Myriad of Lights (dir. Shen Fu)
- 1949 Hope in the World (dir. Shen Fu)
- 1949 Crows and Sparrows (dir. Zheng Junli)
- 1949 Women Side by Side (dir. Chen Liting)
- 1955 Storm on the Southern Island (dir. Bai Chen)
- 1959 It's My Day Off (dir. Lu Ren)
- 1961 Spring Comes to the Withered Tree (dir. Zheng Junli)
- 1963 Early Spring in February (dir. Xie Tieli)
- 1965 Stage Sisters (dir. Xie Jin)

== See also ==
- Xu Lai (actress)
- Wang Ying (actress)
- Sun Weishi
