= Women Side by Side =

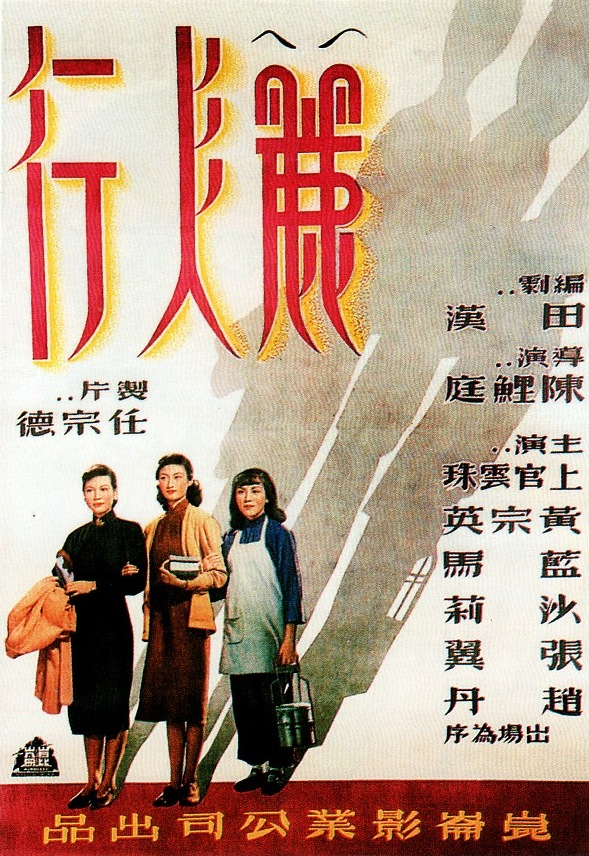
- Film poster
- Traditional Chinese: 麗人行
- Simplified Chinese: 丽人行
- Literal meaning: An array of beautiful women
- Hanyu Pinyin: Lìrén xing
- Directed by: Chen Liting
- Written by: Tian Han; Chen Liting
- Produced by: Ren Zongde
- Starring: Shangguan Yunzhu; Huang Zongying; Sha Li; Zhao Dan; Lan Ma
- Cinematography: Han Zhongliang; Wu Weiyun
- Edited by: Fu Zhengyi; Wu Dingfang
- Production company: Kunlun Film Company
- Release date: January 1949 (China)
- Running time: 102 minutes
- Country: China
- Language: Mandarin

Women Side by Side (Chinese: 麗人行), also translated as Three Women and Female Fighters, is a 1949 Chinese film directed by Chen Liting, made near the end of the Republican era. It is Chen's most famous directorial work. Denounced as a "poisonous weed" during the Cultural Revolution, the film is now considered a Chinese classic.

The film is adapted from a play of the same title written by the noted leftist playwright Tian Han, who also wrote the 1932 film Three Modern Women. Tian Han and Chen Liting co-wrote the screenplay. The film tells the story of three women in wartime Shanghai under Japanese occupation: an uneducated factory worker, an intellectual resistance activist, and a bourgeois new woman. In many ways it can be seen as a sequel to Cai Chusheng's 1935 film New Women. Produced by the left-wing Kunlun Film Company, the film has a strong anti-Kuomintang government undertone.

== Plot ==
The film is set in Japanese-occupied Shanghai in 1944. Jinmei (Shangguan Yunzhu), a textile worker, is raped by two drunken Japanese soldiers on her way home from work. Xinqun (Huang Zongying) and her boyfriend Mengnan (Zhou Feng), who are members of underground resistance, come to her aid and bring her to the home of their friend Ruoying (Sha Li). Ruoying's husband Yuliang (Zhao Dan) had left Shanghai when war broke out in 1937 to join the anti-Japanese resistance, leaving behind his wife and baby daughter Beibei. After years passed without hearing from her husband, Ruoying has married the prosperous banker Zhongyuan (Lan Ma), assuming Yuliang has died. Zhongyuan claims to be politically "unaffiliated". He works with the Japanese but does not inform on his wife's activist friends.

Jinmei's husband Yousheng (Zhang Yi) explodes in anger when hearing about her rape. She begs him to kill her. Moreover, Jinmei loses her factory job when her boss finds out about the rape. She becomes a virtual outcast. Neighbourhood hooligans taunt Jinmei and her husband, who gets in a fight with them and loses his eyesight when they pour chemicals on his face. To support the family, Jinmei turns to loan sharks and is forced into prostitution.

Yuliang abruptly returns to Shanghai. Ruoying meets him at Xinqun and Mengnan's apartment. She explains that to survive in war time she has had no choice but live with the banker, although she still loves Yuliang. Yuliang retorts that her suffering is nothing compared to that of the war refugees in the front. Japanese operatives burst into the room and arrest the couple, mistaking them for Xinqun and Mengnan. Mengnan flees Shanghai but Xinqun stays behind. Yuliang and Ruoying are tortured in the Japanese prison.

Xinqun finds Zhongyuan and asks him to prove his patriotism and use his Japanese connection to secure the release of Yuliang and Ruoying. He agrees, even though the release of Yuliang would ruin his own marriage. He speaks to his Japanese friends, who ask him to help them run a new propagandist publishing house. Zhongyuan agrees, thus becoming for the first time an overt collaborator with the Japanese, ironically to prove to Xinqun that he is a patriot.

The Japanese release Yuliang and Ruoying after Zhongyuan's effort. In a twist, on the opening day of the publishing house, Yuliang throws a bomb into its window, injuring Zhongyuan. Yuliang is forced to flee Shanghai to evade the ensuing manhunt. Beibei, the young daughter, chooses to leave Ruoying and go with her father.

Ruoying, devastated by the departure of Beibei and Zhongyuan's collaboration with the Japanese, further discovers that Zhongyuan has had a mistress who also sleeps with the Japanese. She decides to end her life and leaves a suicide note for Xinqun. She walks to the Huangpu River, where she unexpectedly finds Jinmei, who has attempted suicide but has been pulled from the river by passers-by. Her husband had found out about her prostitution, and kicked her out of the house. Ruoying abandons her suicide plan. Xinqun finds Ruoying and Jinmei and brings them to her girls' school, where she tells her students about the story of the two women. In the last scene, Jinmei's husband arrives at the school and "forgives" her for the rape and prostitution. (In the original stage play, it is Yuliang who returns and reunites with Ruoying).

== Characters and cast ==
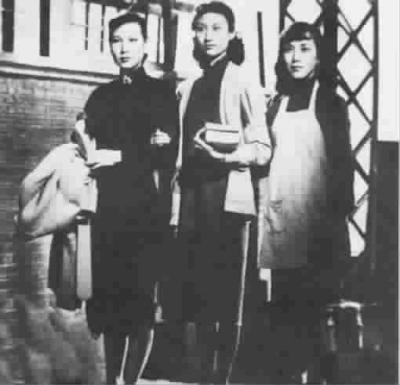
The three women in the film.

Jinmei (金妹), the textile worker, is played by Shangguan Yunzhu, a highly talented actress. Unlike the one-dimensional proletarian heroines common in left-wing films, she is weak and passive. Like many real women during the war, she is brutally raped by Japanese soldiers. The raping of Chinese women is a symbol of the national humiliation during the Japanese occupation. According to Tian Han, Jinmei's role is inspired by true events.

Ruoying (若英), the second woman, is played by the actress Sha Li. She is a stylish and well-educated urban woman. When her first husband leaves Shanghai to join the anti-Japanese resistance, she is left behind with a baby in occupied Shanghai. Severe wartime shortages cause her to live with a banker she does not love. She faces an emotional crisis when her husband, presumed dead, unexpectedly returns.

Xinqun (新群, meaning "new masses"), played by Huang Zongying, is a schoolteacher active in underground resistance. Tian Han revealed years later that she was modeled on the real life of the underground communist activist Mao Liying. She is a former classmate of Ruoying. In contrast to the other two women, she is emotionally and materially secure. She is compassionate and nonjudgmental toward Jinmei and Ruoying, unlike the rest of society.

Yousheng (友生), Jinmei's husband and also a factory worker, is played by Zhang Yi. He bursts into anger after learning about his wife's rape, and further humiliates her after she is already brutalized by the Japanese. His main concern is his own sense of shame instead of his wife's wellbeing. Although a Marxist himself, Tian Han's portrayal of the main working-class man in the film is remarkably negative.

Zhang Yuliang (章玉良), Ruoying's first husband, is played by the famous actor Zhao Dan. Although a patriotic resistance fighter, he is portrayed as cold and heartless. The character reflects Tian Han's concern about oppressive Confucian patriarchal norms.

Wang Zhongyuan (王仲原), the most controversial character, is played "masterfully" by Lan Ma. Although a despised collaborator, he never informs on Xinqun and her patriotic friends, even though he does not like her. When he learns about the return of Yuliang, the resistance fighter who is his romantic rival, he does not betray him to the Japanese. He even uses his Japanese connection to secure the release of Yuliang and Ruoying. In the film the collaborator is given a human face and depicted as a complex character.

== Influence ==
The film was shot in 1948 and released in January 1949 in Shanghai, on the eve of the Communist victory in the Chinese Civil War. Produced by the left-wing Kunlun Film Company, it has a strong anti-government undertone. However, as the civil war was nearly over when the film came about, it likely did not have as great a political impact as the original theatre play that was performed earlier during the war.

After the Communist victory, the kind of multifaceted and humanistic treatment of Japanese-occupied China exhibited in the film became politically unacceptable. During the Cultural Revolution, both Tian Han and Chen Liting were imprisoned. Tian Han, in particular, was a major target of persecution and died in prison. Women Side by Side was called "the work of a renegade" and "a huge poisonous weed".

The film is now recognized as a Chinese classic and considered Chen Liting's best directorial work. In preparation for the 2013 Shanghai International Film Festival, the festival organizers spent a year restoring the film, along with another classic, Zheng Junli's Crows and Sparrows. It was shown on June 19 in the historic Grand Cinema, with a special ceremony attended by actress Qin Yi, who made her film debut in Chen Liting's 1947 film Far Away Love.

== See also ==
- Three Modern Women – 1932 film directed by Bu Wancang
- New Women – 1935 film directed by Cai Chusheng
- List of Chinese films of the 1940s
