= Bai Yang (actress) =

Chinese actress (1920–1996)

- 白杨
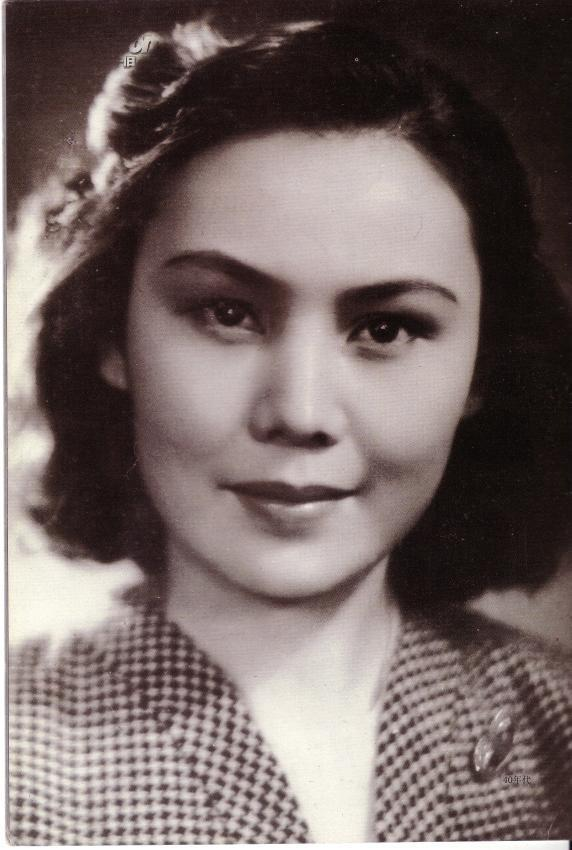
- Born: Yang Chengfang; 4 March 1920; Beijing, China
- Died: 18 September 1996 (aged 76); Shanghai, China
- Resting place: Binhai Guyuan cemetery
- Occupation: Actress
- Notable work: Crossroads; The Spring River Flows East; Eight Thousand Li of Cloud and Moon; New Year's Sacrifice
- Spouse: Jiang Junchao
- Children: 2
- Relatives: Yang Mo (sister)

Bai Yang (Chinese: 白杨; 4 March 1920 – 18 September 1996) was a Chinese film and drama actress mainly active from the 1930s to the 1950s, during which she was one of the country's most popular movie stars. She was considered the foremost of China's "Four Great Actresses," ahead of Qin Yi, Shu Xiuwen, and Zhang Ruifang. Her most famous films include Crossroads (1937), The Spring River Flows East (1947), Eight Thousand Li of Cloud and Moon (1947), and New Year's Sacrifice (1955).

== Early life ==
On 4 March 1920, Bai was born as Yang Chengfang to an affluent family in Beijing, China. Bai was the youngest of four children. Her older sister was Yang Mo, a novelist. Bai's parents both died when she was 11.

Bai acted in a supporting role in Hou Yao's silent film Sad Song from an Old Palace (Gugong Xinyuan), made by the Lianhua Film Company. She became a drama actress for a few years, acting in plays by Tian Han and Hong Shen, as well as foreign plays by Oscar Wilde and Eugene O'Neill.

== Early career and Sino-Japanese War ==
In 1936, Bai Yang joined the Mingxing Film Company in Shanghai. She was given the lead role in Shen Xiling's 1937 film Crossroads, opposite Zhao Dan, the "Prince of Chinese Film". The film was a big hit, and Bai Yang, whose performance received critical acclaim, became highly popular, and was compared by the media to Greta Garbo.

The Second Sino-Japanese War erupted soon afterwards, and Shanghai's film studios were mostly destroyed in the Battle of Shanghai after three months of fighting. With the fall of Shanghai, Bai Yang retreated to Chongqing, the wartime Chinese capital. During the eight years of war, she starred in just three films, including Children of China (dir. Shen Xiling) and Youthful China or Youth of China (dir. Sun Yu), all patriotic in nature. In addition, she acted in more than 40 stage plays, also mainly patriotic. She was considered the foremost of the "Four Great Actresses" of the time, ahead of her peers Qin Yi, Shu Xiuwen, and Zhang Ruifang.

== Post-World War II ==
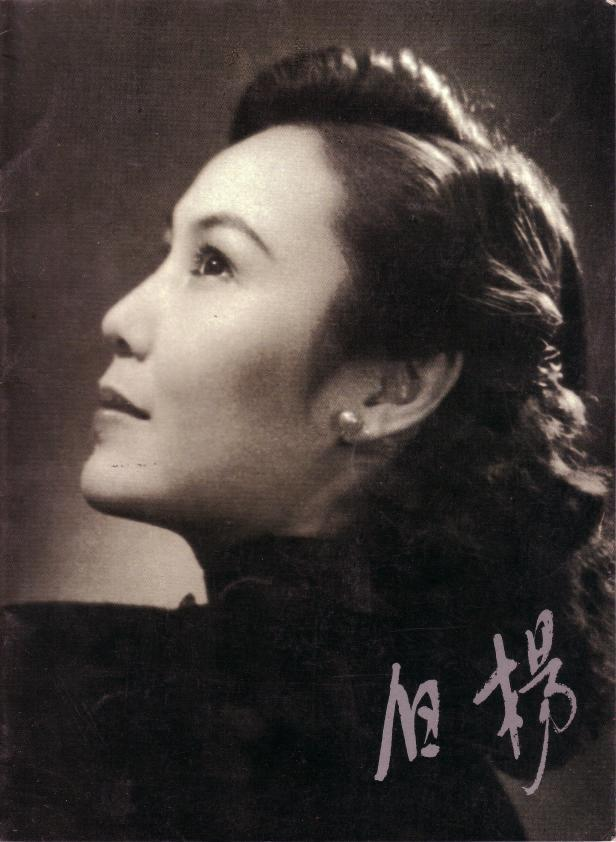
Bai Yang

After the end of World War II, Bai Yang returned to Shanghai and starred in her two most famous films: Eight Thousand Li of Cloud and Moon (directed by Shi Dongshan) and The Spring River Flows East (directed by Cai Chusheng and Zheng Junli), both dealing with the trauma of the war. Her performance in the latter, in which she played a factory worker abandoned by her patriot husband who turned into a factory owner, was considered her career landmark. The film broke all Chinese records and has been considered by some as China's Gone with the Wind. She also starred in Shi Dongshan's The Sorrows of a Bride (1948) and Wu Zuguang's Tears of Mountains and Rivers (1949).

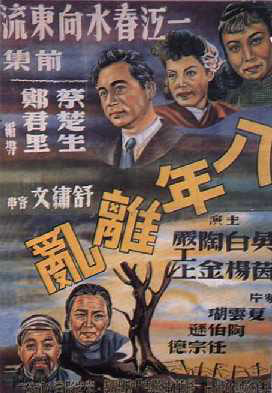
The Spring River Flows East (1947), Bai Yang's most famous performance

Because of her contributions to leftist cinema, Bai Yang was invited to the Tiananmen Gate to attend the founding ceremony of the People's Republic of China on 1 October 1949. She subsequently became an employee of the Shanghai Film Studio and a vice-president of the Chinese Filmworkers' Association. She starred several more films, most notably Sang Hu's 1955 film New Year's Sacrifice, based on Lu Xun's eponymous short story. It was a great success and won the Special Prize of the 1957 Karlovy Vary International Film Festival in Czechoslovakia. In 1957, surveys conducted by two major newspapers ranked her the most popular film actress in China.

Bai Yang's film career was abruptly ended by the turmoil of the Cultural Revolution, during which she was persecuted and incarcerated for five years, although she was not physically harmed like many of her colleagues. After her rehabilitation in the 1970s, she played the role of Soong Ching-ling in a 1989 television drama celebrating the life of the widow of the founding father of modern China. In the same year, she was voted number one of the 10 most popular movie stars of the first 40 years of the PRC. In 1990, a major ceremony was held to celebrate Bai Yang's 60-year career.

== Personal life ==
Bai was married to Jiang Junchao, a film director. They had two children. Their daughter Jiang Xiaozhen also became a film director.

On 18 September 1996, Bai died in Shanghai, China at age 76. She is buried at the Binhai Guyuan cemetery in Shanghai.

== Filmography ==
- Crossroads (1937) - Miss Yang, a college student in Shanghai who works as a technician in a cotton factory.
- Tears of the Yang-Tse (1947) (a.k.a. The Spring River Flows East) - Sufen.
- Eight Thousand Li of Cloud and Moon (1947) - Jiang Lingyu.
- Dongmei (1960) - Li Dongmei.
