= Wang Ping (filmmaker) =

Qing dynasty actor

- Born: Wang Guangzhen; September 2, 1916; Nanjing, China
- Died: December 2, 1990 (aged 74)
- Occupation(s): Film director, actress

Chinese name
- Traditional Chinese: 王蘋
- Simplified Chinese: 王苹
Transcriptions

Wang Ping (simplified Chinese: 王苹; traditional Chinese: 王蘋; pinyin: Wáng Píng; September 2, 1916 – December 1, 1990) was a Chinese film director and actress. She is considered to be the first female director in the People's Republic of China.

== Biography ==
Wang Ping was born and grew up in Nanjing, China. She moved to Taiyuan in 1935. Wang moved again in 1937 following the outbreak of the Second Sino-Japanese War, which motivated her to engage in leftist activism. She toured the country performing in politically oriented plays that supported Chinese resistance before settling in Shanghai after the war ended in 1945. Leftist feminism became a major influence for Wang early in her life and she was a long time supporter of the communist revolution. She worked closely with the Communist Party both leading up to the revolution and after the establishment of the People's Republic of China.

== Career ==
Wang first became interested in the theatre and acting while working as a teacher in her hometown of Nanjing. Her first prominent role as an actress came in 1935 when she took on the leading role in a Chinese adaption of the play A Doll’s House by Henrik Ibsen. Wang's involvement in the play was controversial as the play's major themes clashed with the conservative values of the New Life Movement, which had been launched a year earlier. The New Life Movement, which was created in support by the Chinese Nationalist Party, advocated for the renewal of li, I, Lien, and Chih, the ancient Chinese virtues that guided regular life. The movement rejected individualism, liberalism, socialism and communism. A Doll’s House, which ultimately ends with the lead woman leaving her husband and children to find herself, was considered to be antagonistic to the virtues that the New Life Movement was promoting. Wang was subsequently fired from teaching in 1935 by the Education Bureau of Nanjing Municipal Government and was banned from teaching anywhere in Nanjing.

In 1935 she moved to Taiyuan where she briefly worked for the Northeast Film Company as an actress before joining the Shanghai Amateur Dramatists Association, a leftist theatre group, in 1937. Wang toured the country with the Association, performing in politically oriented plays that supported the Chinese resistance during the Second Sino-Japanese War. She would continue to act in patriotic plays across the country up until the end of the war in 1945. After the war she found work as a supporting actress with the Kunlun Film Company, a Shanghai-based company which produced several important leftists films in the late 40s.

As an actress Wang became well known as a leftist and communist advocate. She was a strong supporter of the Communist Party and operated as an underground worker for the Party while living in Shanghai before the communist revolution and establishment of the People's Republic of China on October 1, 1949. Her support and work for the communist cause was rewarded in 1951 when the August First Film Studio appointed her as a film director. Despite having no previous directorial experience, her appointment was widely supported and she became a successful mainstream socialist filmmaker. It was not unusual in the years following the revolution to appoint novice film directors, partly because there were few professional directors working at that time, and partly because the new Communist government significantly financed the film industry. The film industry was seen as an art form that could reach the masses and could be used to effectively spread the party's political message. Accordingly, Wang's work fit into the mainstream socialist cinema and had an explicit pro-communist message. Her work was not particularly associated with women's film. Although some of her films featured leading women, the narrative focused on class struggle and the communist revolution. When gender struggles were depicted, it was often to reinforce communism as a solution. Her work was financially supported by the state, which provided her with significant access to filmic resources, allowing her to learn the techniques of filmmaking through practice and experiment with film form. She became a respected and influential director.

Wang is considered to be the first female director since the founding of the People's Republic of China in 1949, however she was not the only woman working as a filmmaker in the early communist era. Because gender equality was a significant part of the Communist Party's plan for economic reform, the following two decades would see a rise in the number of female directors in China, although the industry would continue to be overrepresented by men. Wang made her directorial debut in 1952 with an instructional film for the army. Her first feature film, Darkness Before Dawn, was released in 1956. In 1963, Zhou Enlai, the first Premier of the People's Republic of China, appointed Wang to co-direct the film adaption of the popular play Sentinels under the Neon Lights. She remained active until 1985, during her career she directed feature films, musical stage plays, and military instructional videos. She died at the age of 74 on December 2, 1990.

== Filmography ==
As an actress

Year	English title	Chinese title	Role	Notes
1947	The Spring River Flows East	一江春水向東流		
1947	Eight Thousand Li of Cloud and Moon	八千里路雲和月	Jiangxi neighbour	
1948	Myriad of Lights	萬家燈火	Mrs. Chen	Also known as The Lights of Ten Thousand Homes
1948	Caged Spring	关不住的春光	Miss Li	Also known as Spring Light that Cannot be Shut Out
1949	Women Side by Side	麗人行		Also known as Three Women

As a director

Year	English title	Chinese title	Genre	Notes
1953	Héchuān jìngōng	河川进攻	Instructional military film	
1953	Qí jiànhuá sùchéng shìzì fǎ	祁建华速成识字法	Instructional military film	
1956	Darkness before Dawn	冲破黎明前的黑暗	Feature film	Wang's first feature film Co-directed with Liu Peiran
1957	Story of Liubao Village	柳堡的故事	Feature film	
1958	Eternal Wave	永不消逝的电波	Feature film; revolutionary, war	Also known as The Everlasting Radio Signals or The Undying Transmission
1960	Měng lóng shā	勐胧纱	Feature film; revolutionary, war	Co-directed with Yuan Xian
1962	Locust Tree Village	槐树庄	Feature film; revolutionary, drama	1963 2nd Hundred Flowers Award for Best Director
1964	Sentinels under the Neon Lights	霓虹灯下的哨兵	Feature film; revolutionary, drama	
1965	The East is Red	東方紅	Feature film; stage performance; musical	
1966	Youth Red as Fire	青春红似火	Feature film; art film, revolutionary	
1974	Sparking Red Star	闪闪的红星	Feature film; revolutionary, war	
1976	Long March Suit	长征组歌——红军不怕远征难	Feature film; revolutionary	Also known as The Red Army is not afraid of Difficult Expedition – Long March Suite
1978	We are the Eighth Route Army	我们是八路军	Feature film; revolutionary	
1985	The Song of the Chinese Revolution	中国革命之歌	Stage performance; musical	1968 6th Golden Rooster Awards Special Award

== Awards ==
In 1963, Wang Ping won the award for Best Director for her film, Locust Tree Village, at the 2nd Hundred Flowers Awards. In 1968, Wang was presented with a Special Award at the 6th Golden Rooster Awards for her film, The Song of the Chinese Revolution.

== See also ==
- Cinema of China
- Women's cinema
