= Yi jiang chun shui xiang dong liu =

Yi jiang chun shui xiang dong liu (simplified Chinese: 一江春水向东流; traditional Chinese: 一江春水向東流; pinyin: Yī jiāng chūn shuǐ xiàng dōng liú) is the Chinese title of the film:

- The Spring River Flows East, a 1947 film directed by Cai Chusheng and Zheng Junli
- The River Flows Eastwards, a 2004 film directed by Jiang Haiyang
