= Wu Yin (actress) =

Chinese actress

- 吴茵
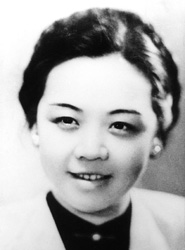
- Born: 2 August 1909; Tianjin, China
- Died: 10 April 1991 (aged 81); Shanghai
- Other name: Yang Ying
- Occupation: Actress
- Notable work: The Spring River Flows East; Myriad of Lights; Crows and Sparrows
- Political party: Chinese Communist Party
- Spouse: Meng Junmou
- Children: 2 sons and 1 daughter

Wu Yin (Chinese: 吴茵; 2 August 1909 – 10 April 1991) was a Chinese film and drama actress active from the 1930s to 1990. She appeared in 45 films and 48 plays, most notably in the classics The Spring River Flows East (1947), Myriad of Lights (1948), and Crows and Sparrows (1949). Famous for playing roles of older women, she was dubbed the "First Old Lady" of Chinese cinema. In 2005 she was chosen as one of the 100 best actors of the 100 years of Chinese cinema.

== Early life and career ==
Wu Yin was born in Tianjin in 1909, to a family from Wu County, Jiangsu province. She was adopted as a little child by her father's blood brother, and her name was changed to Yang Ying (杨瑛).

Wu returned to live with her biological parents at age 13. She studied painting at the Chengdong Girls' School in Shanghai, where she was influenced by the surge of modern drama. In 1929 she made her theatre debut in Tian Han's play Night Talk in Suzhou, directed by Ying Yunwei. At that time she was already married, but her family was adamantly opposed to her acting. Determined to pursue her acting career, she divorced her husband.

== Film career ==
In 1935, Wu Yin made her film debut in Cai Chusheng's classic New Women, starring Ruan Lingyu. Introduced by Ying Yunwei, she joined the Mingxing Film Company in 1936, and appeared in more than ten films, including Crossroads.

When the Japanese invaded China in 1937, Wu Yin fled Shanghai for the wartime capital Chungking, where she acted in many plays and at least three films. After the Japanese surrender in 1945, she returned to Shanghai and joined the Kunlun Film Company. She appeared in many films including Eight Thousand Li of Cloud and Moon (dir. Shi Dongshan) and Far Away Love (dir. Chen Liting), but her most famous roles were those of the old mothers in The Spring River Flows East (dirs. Zheng Junli and Cai Chusheng) and Myriad of Lights (dir. Shen Fu), and Mrs. Xiao in Crows and Sparrows (dir. Zheng Junli).

== After 1949 ==
After the establishment of the People's Republic of China in 1949, Wu Yin acted in several films including The Life of Wu Xun, Song Jingshi and It's My Day Off, before being denounced as a "rightist" in 1957 during the Anti-Rightist Campaign. During the Cultural Revolution she was tortured and lost the ability to walk, and her husband, filmmaker Meng Junmou (孟君谋), was persecuted to death.

After the end of the Cultural Revolution, Wu Yin was politically rehabilitated on 11 December 1978, and joined the Chinese Communist Party in 1985. She appeared in a few more films, and died in 1991.

== Awards ==
In 1957, Wu Yin was awarded the First Class Prize by the Ministry of Culture for her role of Mrs Xiao in the film Crows and Sparrows. In November 2005 she was chosen as one of the 100 best actors of the 100 years of Chinese cinema.

== Selected filmography ==
- New Women (1935)
- Scenes of City Life (1935)
- Crossroads (1937)
- Far Away Love (1947)
- Eight Thousand Li of Cloud and Moon (1947)
- The Spring River Flows East (1947)
- Myriad of Lights (1948)
- Crows and Sparrows (1949)
- The Life of Wu Xun (1950)
- Inescapable (1950)
- The Married Couple (1951)
- Bless the Children (1953)
- Song Jingshi (1955)
- Not a Misunderstanding (1963)
- Family Problem (1964)
- A Man's World (1987)
