= Fu Zhengyi =

Chinese film editor (1925–2019)

- Born: 1925; Fujiawan, Huanggang, Hubei, Republic of China
- Died: November 15, 2019 (aged 93); Beijing
- Occupation: film editor

Fu Zhengyi (Chinese: 傅正义; 1925 – 15 November 2019) was a Chinese film editor. He edited more than 200 films and over 400 television shows or episodes. He won the inaugural Golden Rooster Award for Best Editor in 1982 and the Golden Rooster Award for Lifetime Achievement in 2011.

== Life and career ==
Fu was born in 1925 in Fujiawan, Huanggang, Hubei, Republic of China. His father died when he was three, and he lived on the meagre income of his mother, a weaver. During the Second Sino-Japanese War, he fled Hubei for the wartime capital Chongqing, where he studied at a school for refugee children in Geleshan.

In 1940, Fu entered China Film Studio as an apprentice, working under Wu Tingfang 邬廷芳, Qian Xiaozhang 钱筱璋, and Situ Huimin. After the end of World War II, Fu joined the Kunlun Film Studio in Shanghai, where he participated in the editing of many classical films, including The Spring River Flows East, Eight Thousand Li of Cloud and Moon, Myriad of Lights, Women Side by Side, and Crows and Sparrows. In 1948, Fu was appointed the lead editor of the film The Adventures of Sanmao the Waif, which received positive reviews when it screened in 1949.

After the founding of the People's Republic of China, Fu was appointed deputy editor of the Shanghai Film Studio. A year later, he was transferred to the Changchun Film Studio as chief editor. He was transferred again in 1956, to serve as chief editor of the Beijing Film Studio, where he worked until his retirement. As Shanghai was the centre of China's film industry at the time, Fu introduced the more advanced techniques of the Shanghai studios to Changchun and Beijing. During the PRC period, he edited many acclaimed films such as The Life of Wu Xun, Letter with Chicken Feather (鸡毛信), Song of Youth (青春之歌), Women Generals of the Yang Family (杨门女将), and Little Soldier Zhang Ga (小兵张嘎).

After retiring from Beijing Film Studio in the mid-1980s, Fu began working in the then booming television industry, and edited numerous TV series including Romance of the Three Kingdoms, The Legend of Di Renjie, Zheng He Xia Xiyang, and Dream of the Red Chamber. He edited a total of more than 200 films and over 400 television shows or episodes.

Fu died on 15 November 2019 in Beijing.

== Honours ==
At the 2nd Golden Rooster Awards in 1982, Fu received the first ever Best Editor Award. In 1987, he won the Outstanding Editing Award at the 7th Flying Apsaras Awards for Dream of the Red Chamber. In 2011, he received the Lifetime Achievement Award at the 28th Golden Rooster Awards. He has been called the "first pair of scissors" in China.
