= Sun Daolin =

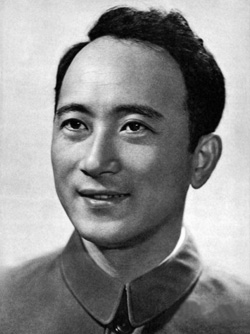
- Born: Sun Yi-liang 孙以亮; December 18, 1921; Beijing, China
- Died: December 28, 2007 (aged 86); Shanghai, China
- Occupations: Actor and film director
- Years active: 1940s-2000s
- Spouse: Wang Wenjuan (m. 1961–2007)
- Children: 1

Chinese name
- Traditional Chinese: 孫道臨
- Simplified Chinese: 孙道临
Transcriptions
Standard Mandarin
- Hanyu Pinyin: Sūn Dàolín

Sun Daolin (simplified Chinese: 孙道临; traditional Chinese: 孫道臨; pinyin: Sūn Dàolín) (December 18, 1921 – December 28, 2007) was a Chinese actor and film director.

== Biography ==
Sun Daolin was born in Beijing on November 18, 1921. He was born Sun Yiliang 孙以亮 into a family of four children. His father Sun Wenyao (孫文耀) was trained as railroad engineer in Brussels, Belgium. His mother Fan Nianhua (范念华) and father both are originally from Jiashan County, Zhejiang. He along with all his siblings learned to speak English since grade school. He attended Yenching University, but his studies in philosophy were interrupted by the Second Sino-Japanese War. During the war he was active in patriotic activities including stage acting and he was jailed briefly by the Japanese Puppet Regime. After the war, he completed his studies and received a degree in philosophy in 1947.

His career had spanned much of the PRC history. One of his earliest roles was in director Zheng Junli’s Crows and Sparrows, a polemic on the corruption of the Nationalist Government just prior to their defeat in the Chinese Civil War. After 1949, Sun continued to act, notably as the eldest brother in an adaptation of Ba Jin’s novel, Family.

Sun Daolin was an actor in the 1950-70's in China. Some four decades ago, to many Chinese, he was an idol and Mr. Right for all unmarried women at his time.

In the 1980s, Sun began to focus increasing energy on directing. In 1983, he wrote, directed and starred in the well-received Thunderstorm, based on the eponymous play by Cao Yu. His second try behind the camera was 1992’s The Stepmother. After his semi-retirement he was active in poetry, Hamlet, Schubert songs. He was at several international film festivals and as late as the 1990s.

Sun died in Shanghai on December 28, 2007 at the age of 86. At his service 1,000s of fans paid the last respect. He is survived by his wife Wang Wenjuan, a Yue opera actress and a daughter Sun Qingyuan (孫慶原), one grand child. Wang was best known for her performance in "The Dream of the Red Chamber".

== Selected filmography ==
=== As actor ===
Year	English Title	Chinese Title	Role	Notes
1949	Crows and Sparrows	乌鸦与麻雀	Hua Haozhi	
1950	Min zhu qing nian jin xing qu	民主青年进行曲		
1955	Reconnaissance Across the Yangtze	渡江侦察记	Li	Based on Xiong Zhaoren
1955	Nan dao feng yun	南岛风云	Han Chengguang	
1957	Family	家	Chueh-hsin	
1957	City Without Night	不夜城		
1958	The Eternal Wave	永不消失的电波		
1961	A Revolutionary Family	革命家庭		
1963	Early Spring in February	早春二月		
1977	Spring			Celebrate the collapse of the Gang of Four
1979	Li Siguang	李四光		
1982	The Go Masters	一盘没有下完的棋		partly filmed in Japan
1983	Thunderstorm	雷雨		

=== As director ===
Year	English Title	Chinese Title	Notes
1983	Thunderstorm	雷雨	
1986	The Provisional President	非常大总统	
1992	The Stepmother	继母	
