= Chen Danyan =

Chinese writer

Chen Danyan 陈丹燕
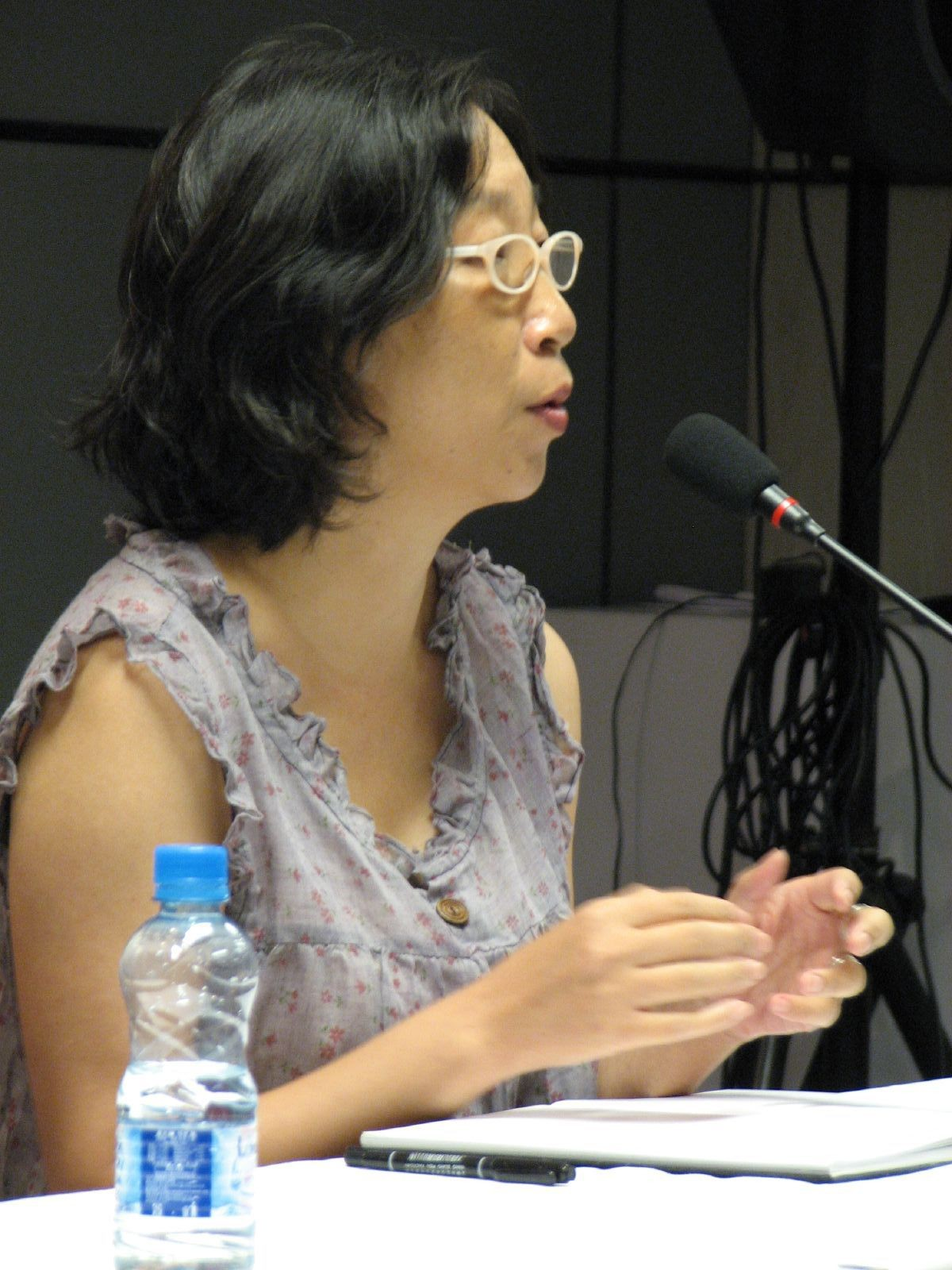
- Chen at Shanghai Book Fair in 2008
- Born: December 18, 1958 (age 67); Beijing
- Education: East China Normal University
- Occupation: Writer
- Writing career
- Notable works: Nine Lives, Shanghai Trilogy

Chen Danyan (Chinese: 陈丹燕; born 18 December 1958) is a writer based in Shanghai, China. Born in Beijing, she moved to Shanghai as a child and her writing revolves around Shanghai and Shanghainese women. She is best known for her trilogy of biographical narratives: Shanghai Memorabilia, Shanghai Princess, and Shanghai Beauty.

== Life and work ==
Chen first published articles in Chinese journals in the 1970s. After studying Chinese literature at East China Normal University (1978–1982) she worked as an editor for the Children's Epoch magazine.

She dealt mainly with Chinese literature until the mid-eighties when she started writing on the life and the emotional world of adolescent girls. The autobiographical novel Nine Lives (1992) dealt with childhood experiences of the Cultural Revolution. She received the UNESCO-Prize for Peace and Tolerance for Nine Lives and was nominated in 1996 for German Youth Literature Prize. Central to her recent work is an exploration of the world of the young generation in China which has grown up as a result of the one-child policy of the past two decades. Another focus of her literary career is articles about her hometown of Shanghai.

== Selected works ==
- 1995 - Nine Lives - a childhood in Shanghai. Zurich.
- 1996 - Niuyue jiari (New York Holidays). Shanghai. ISBN 7-5321-1475-9
- 1998 - Shanghai Memorabilia (上海的风花雪月)
- 1999 - Shanghai Princess (上海的金枝玉叶). Beijing. ISBN 7-5063-1680-3. English edition 2010
- 2000 - Shanghai Beauty (上海的红颜遗事) - Yao Yao and her mother Shangguan Yunzhu. Beijing. ISBN 7-5063-1680-3
- 2002 - Yu he ta de zi xing che. Beijing. ISBN 7-5321-2368-5
- 2003 - Slow Boat To China. (慢船去中国) Shanghai. 【Version 1】: 《Slow Boat To China》 ISBN 9787222037779, 【Version 2】: 《Slow Boat To China-Fanny》Part 1 ISBN 9787532622429, 《Slow Boat To China-Jenny》Part 2 ISBN 9787532622436
- 2006 - Shanghai: China's Bridge to the Future (Cultural China, Man and the Land). Rhinebeck, NY. ISBN 0-7621-0640-9
