= Crows and Sparrows =

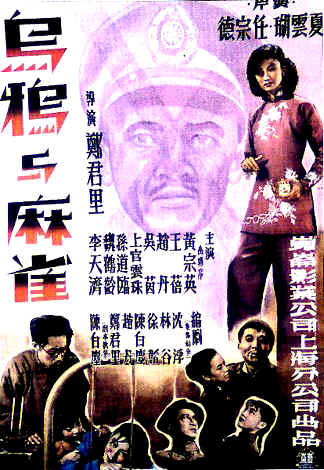
- Chinese poster for Crows and Sparrows (1949)
- Traditional Chinese: 烏鴉與麻雀
- Simplified Chinese: 乌鸦与麻雀
- Hanyu Pinyin: Wūyā yǔ máquè
- Directed by: Zheng Junli
- Written by: Chen Baichen; Liu Gu; Shen Fu; Wang Lingu; Xu Tao; Zhao Dan; Zheng Junli
- Produced by: Xia Yunhu; Ren Zongde
- Starring: Zhao Dan; Sun Daolin; Li Tianji; Huang Zongying; Shangguan Yunzhu; Wu Yin
- Cinematography: Miao Zhenhua
- Edited by: Fu Zhengyi
- Music by: Wang Yunjie
- Production company: Kunlun Film Company
- Release date: January 11, 1949 (China)
- Running time: 111 minutes
- Country: China
- Language: Mandarin

Crows and Sparrows (simplified Chinese: 乌鸦与麻雀; traditional Chinese: 烏鴉與麻雀; pinyin: Wūyā yǔ Máquè) is a 1949 Chinese film made by the left-leaning Kunlun Studios on the eve of the Communist victory, directed by Zheng Junli and scripted by Chen Baichen. Notable for its extremely critical view of corrupt Nationalist bureaucrats, the film was made as Chiang Kai-shek's Nanjing-based government was on the verge of collapse, and was not actually finished and released until after the Chinese Civil War had ended.

The film takes place in Shanghai, and it revolves around a group of tenants struggling to prevent themselves from being thrown out onto the street due to a corrupt party official's attempts to sell their apartment building.

The film was the winner of the 1957 Huabiao Film Awards for the “Outstanding Film” category, and starred Zhao Dan, Sun Daolin, Wu Yin and Shangguan Yunzhu in leading roles.

== Plot ==
In the winter of 1948, the Kuomintang of China (KMT) is losing in the Huai Hai Campaign with Chinese Communist Party (CCP) during the Civil War. Kuomintang government officials started to persecute the people more severely to upkeep their luxurious lifestyles. At a Shanghai shikumen house, Mr. Hou, a former Japanese collaborator, now a Section chief at the Kuomintang Ministry of Defense, is planning to sell the house which he seized from the owner Kong Yuwen and then fly to Taiwan. He appoints his mistress, Yu Xiaoying or so-called Mrs. Hou, to give an ultimatum to the rest of the tenants to move out.

The house is tenanted by three families: Mr. Kong, a proofreader in a newspaper agency, whose son joined the New Fourth Army; Mr. and Mrs. Xiao, foreign goods vendors with their three kids; and a schoolteacher, Mr. Hua, his wife and their daughter Wei Wei. When Mr. Xiao proposes they should band together, others disagree and want to find alternative solutions. Mr. Kong and Mr. Hua try to find a place to stay at their workplaces respectively, while Mr. and Mrs. Xiao hope to invest in black market gold in order to buy the apartment building from Mr. Hou.

However, things don't go as they expected. The employer is unwilling to provide Mr. Kong with accommodation. Mr. Hua is arrested by KMT agents for signing a letter protesting the school administration permitting for police to unjustly arrest its employees. Mr. and Mrs. Xiao found their scheme of wealth accumulating go bad after the gold price rose sharply due to the government's manipulation. What's worse: they're beaten by the crowd who are also waiting to trade yuan notes for gold at the central bank. Meanwhile, desperate as she is, Mrs. Hua resorts to asking Mr. Hou to bail her husband out of jail. However, Hou only wants to make her his mistress. Infuriated, Mrs. Hua rejects him and rushes home, while her daughter falls desperately ill. With generous help from Mr. Kong and Ah Mei (Mrs. Hou's kind-hearted maid), Wei Wei and Mr. and Mrs. Xiao fully recover from their illness and injuries.

The tenants finally decide not to move out in a showdown with Mr. Hou. Soon, Hou receives a phone call, telling him that the defeated KMT is about to abandon its capital, Nanjing and retreat to Taiwan. Early the next morning, he and his mistress sneak out of the house and prepare to flee to Taiwan. The KMT agents release Mr. Hua while his fellow teachers are executed. As the remaining KMT members all run off from Mainland China, the tenants celebrate Chinese New Year in 1949, promising to improve themselves in the face of the coming new society.

== Cast ==
- Wei Heling as Kong Youwen (nicknamed Confucius)
- Zhao Dan as Mr. Xiao (nicknamed Little Broadcast)
- Wu Yin as Mrs. Xiao
- Sun Daolin as Hua Jiezhi
- Shangguan Yunzhu as Mrs. Hua
- Li Tianji as Hou Yibo
- Huang Zongying as Yu Xiaoying (or Mrs. Hou)
- Wang Bei as Ah Mei
- Wang Lulu as Wei Wei
- Xu Weijie as Da Mao
- Qiu Huan as Er Mao
- Ge Meiqiang as Little Mao

== Introduction of Main Characters ==
- Kong Youwen (nicknamed Confucius)
  An experienced proof-reader in the newspaper office, who's grown pessimistic after years of hardship. His son is a member of the communist New Fourth Army. Kong used to own the apartment complex, but he's been relegated to a small apartment on the bottom floor after Hou Yibo seized the building by threat of force.
- Mr. Xiao (nicknamed Little Broadcast)
  A street vendor and commodity speculator. He has a preoccupation with wealth, and schemes to get rich, such as hoarding expensive medication in hopes the price will surge. He lives with his wife, Mrs. Xiao, and their three sons, Big Mao, Second Mao, and Little Mao, in a ground floor apartment.
- Mrs. Xiao
  Another street vendor, who sells mostly canned goods important from the United States. She shares her husband's aspirations of riches. Despite their schemes and caches of valuables, their family lives in relative economic precarity.
- Hua Jiezhi
  A left-leaning but somewhat self-important and cowardly high school teacher. He's well read in liberal and communist literature and speaks highly of social transformation, but several recent arrests of political organizers at his school have left him paranoid and avoidant of anything that might risk his position. He lives with his wife, Mrs. Hua, and their daughter Wei Wei in a small terrace apartment.
- Mrs. Hua
  A hardworking mother struggling to provide for her family. She's deeply devoted to her daughter and husband, although she sometimes grows frustrated with Mr. Hua over his neglect of practical matters in favor of loft theory.
- Hou Yibo
  A mid-ranking section chief at the KMT Ministry of Defence. He's prone to petty and self-enriching corruption, like using his government connections and relationship with the police to seize the apartment building previously owned by Kong Youwen. He lives with his concubine Yu Xiaoying on the second floor.
- Yu Xiaoying (or Mrs. Hou)
  A concubine of Hou Yibo. She largely lives a life of leisure, playing mahjong with friends and attending to Mr. Hou's wealth and properties. She's distrustful of the building's tenants, and often seeks to further exploit them.
- Ah Mei
  A girl from the countryside who works as a servant for Yu Xiaoying and Hou Yibo.

== Theme & Title ==
The title is a dramatization of small birds banding together to fend off a larger crow. The Metaphor of tiny sparrows is used to highlight the struggle of the common people against their oppressors.

This dramatization was inspired by the events of the Chinese civil war. In 1948, China's political situation was unstable and the Chinese Communist Party (CCP) was carrying out three major battles against Kuomintang. Actors and employees of the Kunlun Film Company discussed a potential script over dinner, highlighting the political and social difficulties of recent events. Sensing that significant changes were about to occur in China, it was decided that the film would serve as an allegory towards China ushering towards a new age.

Drawing both from the literal and the metaphorical, the setting of the apartment building draws on the imagery of the housing shortages that occurred after the conclusion of China's war with Japan to explore themes of a divided and exploited nation. Many tenants were forced to share living spaces with other equally destitute occupants given the inflation from the war. These cramped living spaces forced people from all trades of life, and a diverse range of economic classes, to collude together. The "house" also serves as a nation usurped by dictators but eventually returned to its original owners, who promise to construct a new future. The two-storey house epitomises and literalises the social hierarchy of the crows and the sparrow, Hou and his mistress lord it over the tenants and live upstairs, where Kong used to live as the original owner. The tenants divide up the rooms below according to their social positions and professions.

The “Crows” represent the corrupt officers and the oppressive power of the Kuomintang, while the “Sparrows” symbolize the commoners, namely the oppressed citizens of China suffering under the KMT's iron grip. The director used low angle shots to portray the Crows living upstairs as powerful dominators looming over the commoners, whilst also using high angle shots to convey the weakness and powerlessness of the Sparrows over their KMT overlords. But eventually, the Crows were overthrown, and the apartment eventually returned to the hands of the Sparrows; the common folk of China. The film underlines the co-implicating relationship between the oppressors and the oppressed by visualizing their simultaneous distance and proximity with respect to the usage of mise-en-scène, and literal physical distance. Such proximity produces a kind of porosity that allows the Sparrows to monitor the Crows––thus, facilitating their subversion of the existing social hierarchy.

Through these explorations of the conditions of the lower classes and their solidarity against the powerful, Crows and Sparrows displays a critical realism that is similar to prewar social realism.

== Background ==
=== Historical Background ===
The film was produced at the tail end of the Chinese Civil War. Fighting between the KMT (Kuomintang) and CCP (Chinese Communist Party), which had been paused in 1937 at the start of the Second Sino-Japanese War, resumed in 1945 following the surrender of the Japanese. Although the KMT began with a significant military advantage, the CCP effectively leveraged guerrilla tactics and assistance from the Soviet Union, and by 1948 the war had tipped in their favor.

China was also in the midst of an extended period of hyperinflation, with prices rising over one-thousandfold between 1935 and 1945. The effects of this were often difficult for the lower classes. Since currency was unable to effectively store value, individuals and merchants alike had to quickly move to offload money in favor of goods which wouldn't lose their value. Vendors’ inability to make careful purchases lead them to increase their markups. Compounding this, wages were often tied to cost-of-living indexes which were several days behind the rapidly increasing market prices, causing a reduction in their real value.

=== Social Context ===
Given the Nationalist government's mismanagement and economic blunders, many of Shanghai's intellectuals and lower classes eagerly awaited what they suspected was an imminent Communist victory. By early 1949, the Communist army had begun what would be its final campaigns of the war, and many in Shanghai felt that a major transformative moment was approaching. Many hoped this coming change would bring with it liberation. Among these hopeful intellectuals were a number of Shanghai filmmakers, and as the war drew to a close studios began making films which specifically addressed these developments.

=== Political Views ===
Kunlun Film Company was created in 1947 under the direction of Zhou Enlai. All of the company's top executives were Chinese Communist Party supporters and members. The film's continued "visual metaphor" of the upstairs / downstairs, where its three protagonist families are often seen gathered at the bottom of the stairs directly confronting the greedy and abusive "crow" (Mr. Hou and his mistress) at the top of the stairs, clearly shows its support for the Communist party. This was likely intentional, as Director Zheng Junli embraced the Communist Party from beginning to end, never questioning their validity over his creative power. He followed the Party's orders to the letter. Despite the Communist Party's support for Zheng Junli's "leftist" films, the Red Guard would eventually punish him during the Cultural Revolution. At the age of 58, he died in prison in 1969. Chen Baichen, a scriptwriter, has also been a CCP member since 1932. He created many plays to promote the CCP during the civil war, but his scripts led to his being labelled a traitor and imprisoned for years. In the 1970s Zheng Junli's character was "repaired" as he was deemed a progressive and an enlightened saint. Which was not the case; in the 1950s and 60s when he was viewed as an bourgeois degenerate. Neither of which are true to his character, when he was alive he surrounded himself around "leftists" like Xia Yan and Chen Baichen.

Time Background

The story of the film was take place in 1948 to early 1949. The film tells the story of several families in a building in Shanghai who struggle against the Nationalist officer Hou Yibo at the end of the Nationalist regime in 1948. The film displays a simple ideal sentiment with a touch of the era, and moreover, a frank technique and a swaying oriental aesthetic characteristic of the early days of Chinese cinema. The film represents a shaky state of society and gives the audience an attitude of uncertainty, trepidation, expectation and class struggle. The statements of optimism about the "new society" by two characters at the film's end are attributable to the film being completed after the communists won the Chinese Civil War.

== Production ==
=== Censorship ===
Crows and Sparrows was made near the end of the Civil War, when “the outcome of the war was obvious to all”. During this period, as Shanghai was still in control of the Nationalist Party, films and other cultural productions had to go through heavy censorship, often referred to as the “white terror”. Therefore, Chen Baichen (陈白尘), the screenwriter, prepared two versions of the screenplay, and managed to use the self-censored version to pass the censor. However, during the production, the hidden version was discovered by the censorship department and was compelled to stop as it “disturbed the social security and damaged government prestige” (“扰乱社会治安，破坏政府威信”). The production had to go underground until Shanghai’s liberation on May 27, 1949 which lead to the production being able to finish shooting during the daytime. The films released by the central government were intended to glorify the KMT's corrupt actions, but the true voices of the people is the criticism produced by these private film studios. Following the change in overnance, the director, Zheng Junli, sped up the production of the film, Crows and Sparrows, and reintroduced much of the content that had been previously removed by censors. Since it was among the first films to be released, it likely would have been “the first time the audience heard from a screen the antigovernment slang that was familiar on the streets in 1948 and 1949.”

=== Inspiration ===
Crows and Sparrows was conceived over dinner by Shanghai Kunlun Film Co., Ltd's Chen Baichen, Shen Fu, Zheng Junli, Chen Yuting, and Zhao Dan, and the script was completed the next day. The Communist Party and the KMT were fighting for the three primary fights in China's political situation in 1948. The group of filmmakers discussed the precarious social environment over dinner and predicted that things would change dramatically, so they were prepared to shoot a feature film that would document the Kuomintang regime's demise and reflect the filmmakers' optimism for a new world. Over the course of the night, they met with a number of scriptwriters. Soon after, they discussed the script's outline, gave it the title, Crows and Sparrows, and handed it over to Chen Baichen to write. They also agreed to let Zheng Junli direct, as he had previously collaborated with Cai Chusheng on Spring River Flows East.

=== Camera Movement ===
- Zoom in on newspaper advertisement.
- A crane shot early in the film reveals the ‘vertical’ relationship among the residents.
- Camera pans to show Hou Boyi in uniform from the back.
- Use dolly movement to show the old gentleman's popularity.
- Through rack focus to shift the focus from the landlord to the tenant.
- Track two people to show the problem they were discussing.
- Tilt camera to show A protest by people who don't want to move.

=== Actual Events ===
Screenwriter Chen Baichen reflects actual problems happening in China at the time of Crows and Sparrows. During the 1940s, China experienced inflation that negatively affected much of the Chinese population. The nationalist government introduced restrictive measures in 1947 which were a failed attempt at curbing inflation. By mid-1947 the KMT launched their attack on the communist government. The war became their central focus and all other concerns were put to the side. The KMT government printed money to finance weapons, machinery and their army. This further fed the devaluation of the Chinese currency and in 1948 Inflation peaked when wholesale prices in Shanghai increased 7.5 million times since the 1945 prices. The hyperinflation killed the economy and industry. Citizens had to purchase gold from the KMT government which is depicted in the scene where Xiao purchases gold bars.

== Reception ==
The film was fairly popular upon release. A revised version premiered in early 1950 and was shown 577 times in Shanghai that year, netting an audience of 287,000.

=== Accolades ===
Award	Category	Subject	Result
Huabiao Awards (1957)	Outstanding Film	Zheng Junli	Won
Huabiao Awards (1957)	Best Actress	Wu Yin	Won

=== The Influence of Chairman Mao and Premier Zhou ===
Crows and Sparrows received a second prize from the Ministry of Culture of New China in 1956. Zhou Enlai, the Premier at the time, expressed his dissatisfaction with the result. “These people put their lives on the line and made such a great film,” he says, continuing: “Why did they get only the second prize?”. Mao Zedong expressed a similar dissatisfaction with the film's poor reception, believing it deserved a higher rating. This is unsurprising, given that Crows and Sparrows was made by a Communist Party-influenced studio and bore little resemblance to films like Sun Yu's The Life of Wu Xun (1951), which Mao harshly denounced for "trying to alter the brains of intellectuals.” Given Mao's dominant status, the Ministry of Culture of New China re-awarded the first prize to Crows and Sparrows.

== See also ==
- Cinema of China
- Huabiao Awards
- Film Censorship in China
- Chinese Civil War
