= Qin Yi =

Chinese actress (1922–2022)

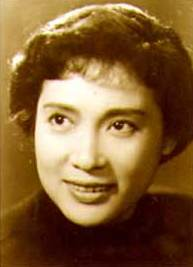
- Qin in the 1940s
- Born: Qin Dehe; 4 February 1922; Shanghai, China
- Died: 9 May 2022 (aged 100); Shanghai, China
- Occupation: Actress
- Years active: 1938–2019
- Spouses: Chen Tianguo (m. 1939, divorced) Jin Yan (m. 1947; died 1983)
- Children: Jin Feiheng; Jin Jie
- Awards: Golden Phoenix Awards 1995 Special Honorary Award 2005 Lifetime Achievement Award; Shanghai International Film Festival 2008 Lifetime Achievement Award; Golden Rooster Awards 2009 Lifetime Achievement Award
- Musical career
- Also known as: Qin Dehe

Chinese name
- Chinese: 秦怡
Transcriptions
Standard Mandarin
- Hanyu Pinyin: Qín Yí
- Wade–Giles: Ch'in I
- IPA: [tɕʰǐn ǐ]
Wu
- Romanization: Dzin Yij

Alternative Chinese name
- Chinese: 秦德和
Transcriptions
Standard Mandarin
- Hanyu Pinyin: Qín Déhé
- Wade–Giles: Ch'in Tê-ho
- IPA: [tɕʰǐn tɤ̌.xɤ̌]

Qin Yi (Chinese: 秦怡; 4 February 1922 – 9 May 2022) was a Chinese actress. She gained fame for her stage performances in the war-time capital Chongqing during the Second Sino-Japanese War. After the war, she became one of China's most popular film actresses throughout the 1950s and the 1960s, and was recognised as one of the country's top four actresses. Premier Zhou Enlai called her the "most beautiful woman in China".

== Early life and theatre career ==
Qin Yi was born on 4 February 1922 to a wealthy Shanghai family. Her name at birth was Qin Dehe (Chinese: 秦德和). She was one of the many daughters in the family. She enjoyed watching movies and Ruan Lingyu (1910–1935) was her favourite actress.

After the Japanese invasion of China in 1937, Qin fled to Wuhan and became active in anti-Japanese activities. When Wuhan also fell to the Japanese, she fled to the war-time capital Chongqing in 1938, and received actor training at the China Movie Studio. She joined several theatre groups, and acted in dozens of plays, including The Good Earth Huichun, Imperial Minister, and La Traviata. In 1943, the influential playwright Xia Yan first named her with Shu Xiuwen, Zhang Ruifang, and Bai Yang as China's "four great drama actresses" (四大名旦). The label became widely known, and after the founding of the People's Republic of China in 1949, the four were officially recognised by the new government as the "Top Four Actresses of China".

== Film career ==
After the surrender of Japan at the end of the World War II, Qin Yi moved back to Shanghai, and in 1946 acted in The Loyal Family, her first feature film. The next year, she had her first leading role in Chen Liting's Far Away Love opposite Zhao Dan, which made her a famous movie star. She then played the leading role in Tang Xiaodan's Lost Love opposite her husband Jin Yan. The film was shot during the final year of the Chinese Civil War, and was released after the Communists took over Shanghai from the defeated Kuomintang (KMT) in May 1949. Owing to the changing political situation, the film was screened for only a short period. Like other Chinese filmmakers and actors, Qin Yi and Jin Yan had to decide whether to flee to British Hong Kong, join the KMT in its evacuation to Taiwan, or stay in Shanghai and work with the new regime. As Qin Yi was a leftist-leaning actress sympathetic to the Communist cause, the couple decided to stay.

After 1949, Qin Yi became an actress of the newly established Shanghai Film Studio, and was appointed deputy head of the Actors' Theatre Troupe. She played the leading roles in many films including Railway Guerrillas, Woman Basketball Player No. 5, Lin Zexu, Song of the Youth, and Loyal Overseas Chinese, as well as supporting roles in many others. She remained one of the most popular film actresses in China throughout the 1950s and 1960s, and Premier Zhou Enlai called her "the most beautiful woman in China".

Qin Yi and her family suffered greatly during the Cultural Revolution, like millions of other Chinese. She was separated from her family for years, and spent five or six years undergoing struggle sessions and performing forced labour in rural areas. Her son, who was diagnosed with schizophrenia in 1965, just before the start of the Cultural Revolution, could not receive the necessary medical care and his condition steadily worsened. After the Cultural Revolution, Qin Yi made a comeback in the 1980s. She won the inaugural Golden Eagle Award for Best Actress in 1983 for her performance in the television drama series Under the Eaves of Shanghai. In 2009 she won the Golden Rooster Award for Lifetime Achievement. Known for her subtle and fine acting, she has been called the "Ingrid Bergman of China".

== Personal life ==
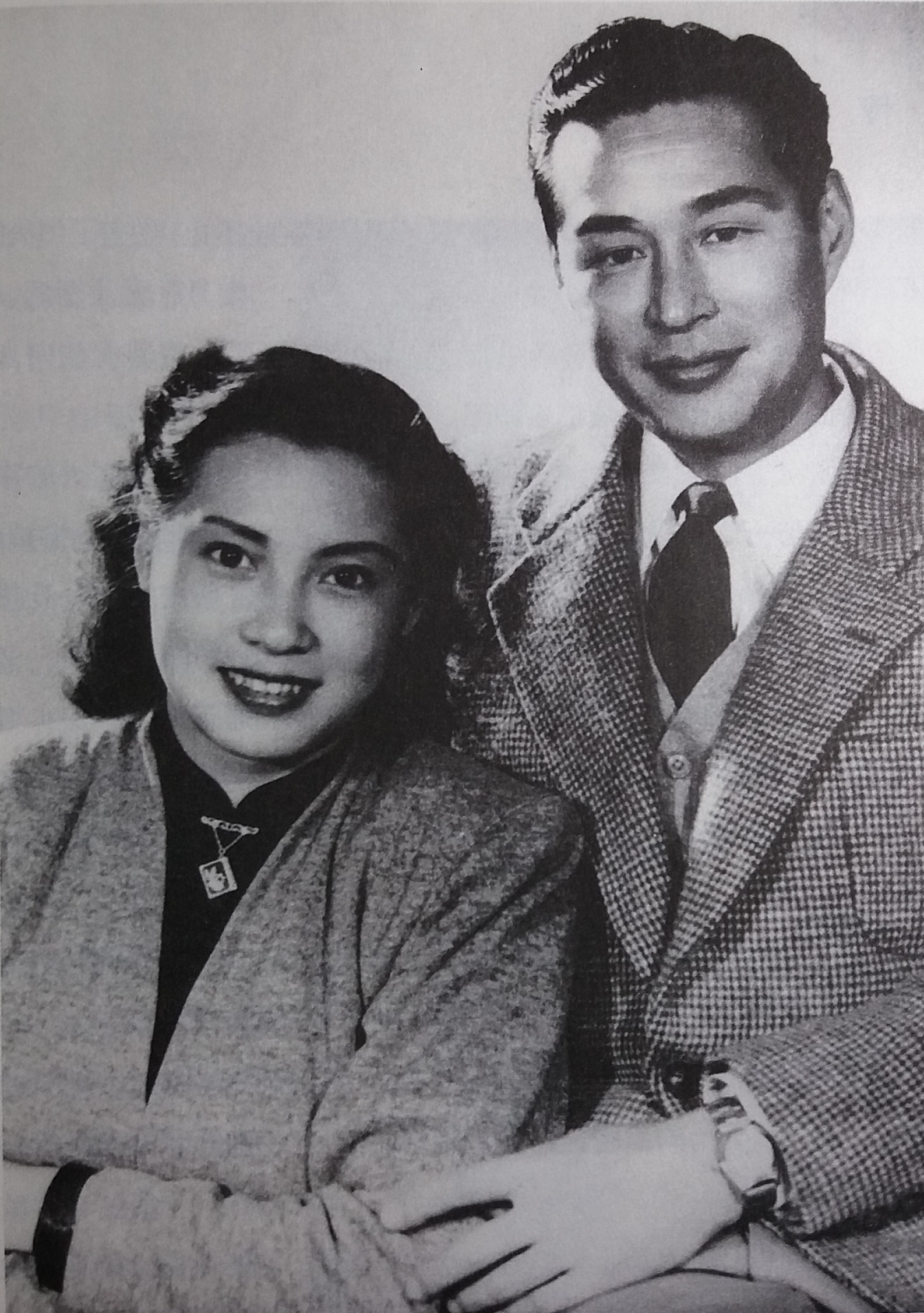
Qin Yi and Jin Yan

Qin Yi married actor Chen Tianguo (陈天国) in 1939. The marriage was short-lived as Chen was an alcoholic and physically abusive. She decided to divorce him even though she gave birth to a daughter, who was later renamed Jin Feiheng using her step-father's surname.

In 1947, Qin Yi married Korean-born Chinese actor Jin Yan, known as China's "Film Emperor" in the 1930s and 1940s. They had a son named Jin Jie (金捷), who suffered from schizophrenia and could not live independently. Qin Yi took constant care of him, especially after the death of her husband in 1983. She also took up the cause of the handicapped. Despite his mental condition, Jin Jie had a talent in painting. At a 2002 charity auction in Shanghai, actor Arnold Schwarzenegger purchased one of his paintings for US$25,000, and praised Qin Yi for her devotion to her son. Jin Jie died in 2007 at the age of 59. She had saved 200,000 yuan for the care of her son, but as he predeceased her, she donated the entire amount to the victims of the 2008 Sichuan earthquake.

She turned 100 on 4 February 2022 and died on 9 May 2022.

== Films ==
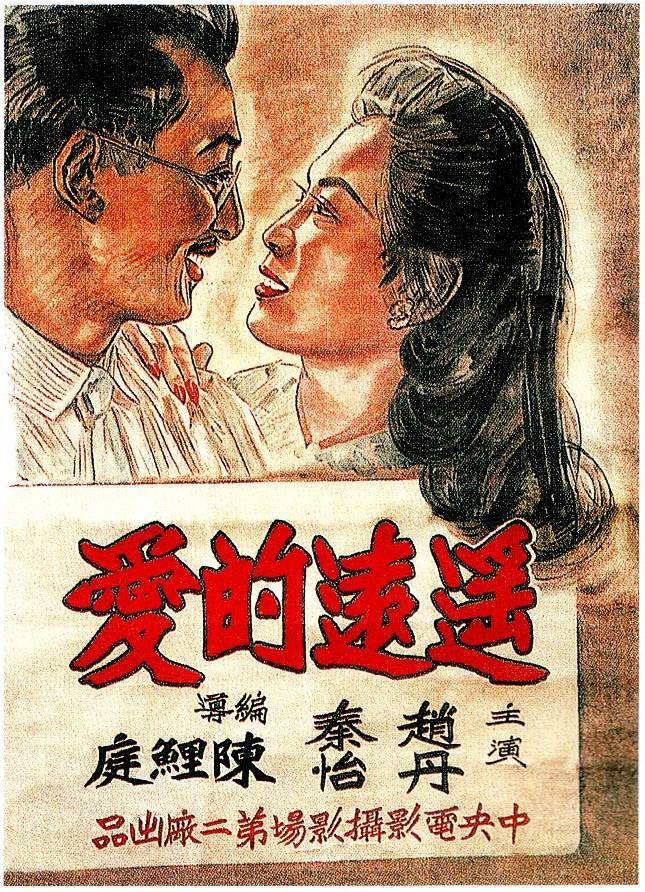
Far Away Love (1947), Qin Yi's first major film

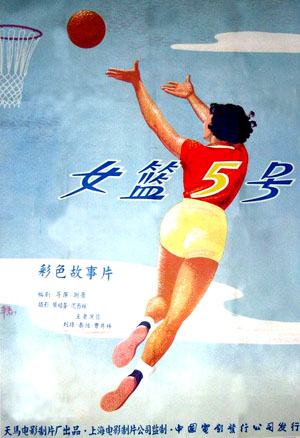
Woman Basketball Player No. 5

Year	English title	Chinese title	Ref.
1946	The Loyal Family		
1947	Far Away Love	遙遠的愛	
1949	Mother	母亲	
1949	Lost Love	失去的爱	
1956	Railway Guerrillas	铁道游击队	
1957	Woman Basketball Player No. 5	女篮5号	
1979	Troubled Laughter	苦恼人的笑	
1982	Under the Eaves of Shanghai	上海屋檐下	

== Awards ==
Qin Yi received several awards, including:

- Golden Eagle Awards
  - 1983 Best Actress (for Under the Eaves of Shanghai)
- Shanghai International Film Festival
  - 2008 Lifetime Achievement Award
- Golden Rooster Awards
  - 2009 Lifetime Achievement Award
- Golden Phoenix Awards
  - 2009 Lifetime Achievement Award

== Bibliography ==
- Meyer, Richard J. (2009). Jin Yan: The Rudolph Valentino of Shanghai. Hong Kong University Press. ISBN 978-962-209-586-1.
- Song, Yuwu (2013). Biographical Dictionary of the People's Republic of China. McFarland. ISBN 978-1-4766-0298-1.
