= Bai Chen =

Chinese director and screenwriter (1922–2002)

- 白沉
- Born: Tian Zuheng (田祖恒); 22 May 1922; Suzhou, China
- Died: 5 November 2002 (aged 80)
- Other names: Chen Bai, Bai Shen
- Occupation(s): Director; Screenwriter

Bai Chen (Chinese: 白沉; 22 May 1922 – 5 November 2002), born Tian Zuheng (Chinese: 田祖恒), was a Chinese film director, screenwriter, and actor.

== Life and career ==
Born in Suzhou, the son of a Hanlin Academy member, Bai became orphan of both parents when he was 11. He started his career on stage while being in high school, and during the World War II he served as an actor for the troupes. After working as an actor in Shanghai, in 1946, he moved to Hong Kong, where he served as assistant director of Zhu Shilin and started appearing in small roles in films.

Bai made his directorial debut in 1949, specializing in opera films. Because of his political positions, he was expelled from Hong Kong in 1952, and returned to Shanghai, where was put under contract at Shanghai Film Studio. In 1955, he had a major hit with the war-drama Storm on the Southern Island. In 1956, he formed the "Society of Five Flowers" together with colleagues Xie Jin, Xu Changlin and Yang Hua, with the aim of collaborating and supporting each other's project.

Following the launch of the Anti-Rightist Campaign, Bai was marked as a Rightist and sent to Anhui to work as a farm labourer. After collaborating with the Anhui Provincial Drama Troupe, in 1979 he was able to return to Shangai and reprise his career, making his official comeback with Ten Days, released in 1980. His 1983 film Under the Bridge was entered into the 41st Venice International Film Festival, and was the first chapter in his critically acclaimed "Women's Trilogy", also consisting of Spring in the Autumn (1985), and Wind Coming Down the Mountains (1990). These final three films won several accolades, and contributed to launch the careers of actresses Gong Xue and Song Jia. He died on 5 November 2002, at the age of 80.
