= Ying Yin =

Chinese actress

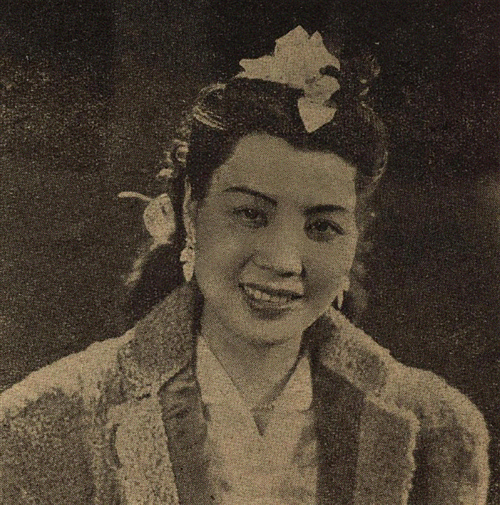
- Born: 28 March 1916; Beijing, China
- Died: 23 January 1942 (aged 25); Shanghai, China
- Occupation: Actress
- Years active: 1934–1941

Ying Yin (Chinese: 英茵, 28 March 1916 – 23 January 1942) was a Chinese actress active in the 1930s and 1940s. During the Japanese occupation of Hong Kong in 1942, she worked for the Chinese intelligence. She assisted a Chinese resident in Hong Kong, who was apprehended and shot by the Japanese occupation authorities. Ying Yin, who loved him, was unable to endure this situation, and committed a Shinjū suicide by taking a large dose of opium.

== Life ==
Ying Yin was born under the Beiyang government in Beijing. Her father's younger brother was Ying Lianzhi.

Shortly after she graduated from Peiping High Normal School, she came to Shanghai where she studied and started performing at the Song and Dance Training Course organized by Li Jinhui and the Lianhua Film Company. In 1936, she joined the Mingxing Film Company, has in the films such as Crossroads in the show, and starred in the movie Dream Universe.

The Second Sino-Japanese War broke out after the show. Yin Ying was romantically involved with a high ranking Chinese government official named Ping Zu Ren. In April 1941, Ping Zu Ren was arrested by the Japanese military police. Ping Zu Ren was executed by the Japanese gendarmerie on 8 January 1942. His body was reclaimed by his family and was buried in the Hong Chau International Cemetery. Yin Ying vowed to help support his family. On 23 January 1942, she committed suicide in Room 708 on the 10th floor of the Park Hotel in Shanghai. When she had locked the door alone, she drank a half bowl of raw opium, spirits, and a large amount of sleeping pills. She left a suicide note to the public movie company owner Lu Jie.
