= The River Flows Eastwards =

Chinese television series

The River Flows Eastwards (Chinese: 一江春水向东流) is a 2005 Chinese television series starring Hu Jun, Anita Yuen, Carina Lau and Chen Daoming, adapted from the classic Chinese film The Spring River Flows East.
