= Liu Qiong =

Chinese film director and actor (1913–2002)

- Born: Liu Boyao; October 16, 1913; Beijing, Republic of China
- Died: April 28, 2002 (aged 88); Shanghai, People's Republic of China
- Occupations: Actor, filmmaker
- Spouse: Di Fan (m. 1946–2002)
- Children: 2

Chinese name
- Traditional Chinese: 劉瓊
- Simplified Chinese: 刘琼
Transcriptions
Standard Mandarin
- Hanyu Pinyin: Liú Qióng

Birth name
- Traditional Chinese: 劉伯瑤
- Simplified Chinese: 刘伯瑶
Transcriptions
Standard Mandarin
- Hanyu Pinyin: Liú Bóyáo

Liu Qiong (16 October 1913 – 28 April 2002) was a Chinese film director and actor.

== Selected filmography ==
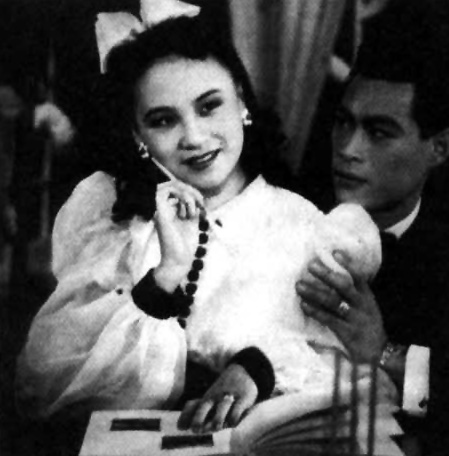
Chen Yen-yen in 1942's 'Wedding Night' with Liu Qiong

=== As director ===
- A Fishing Girl Singer (1983)
- Ashima (1964)
- Military Depot No. 51 (1961)
- Master Qiao Mounts the Sedan (1959)
- The Big Wave (1958)
- Ode to Youth (1953)
- A Bachelor is Born (1952)
- The Insulted and Injured (1950)

=== As actor ===
- Once Upon a Time in Shanghai (1998)
- The Dream is not a Dream (1993)
- Amid the Howling Wind (1990)
- Sunset, The (1986)
- The Herdsman (1982)
- Woman Basketball Player No. 5 (1957)
- The Fiery Phoenix (1951)
- The Soul of China (1948)
- Family (1941) - Gao Juemin
- On Stage and Backstage (1937)
- The Lost Pearl (1937)
- New Women (1935)
- The Big Road (1934)
