= Myriad of Lights =

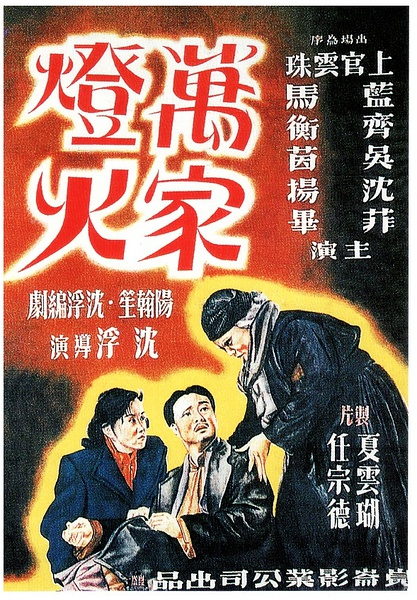
- Film poster
- Traditional Chinese: 萬家燈火
- Simplified Chinese: 万家灯火
- Hanyu Pinyin: Wànjiā Dēnghuǒ
- Directed by: Shen Fu
- Written by: Shen Fu; Yang Hansheng
- Produced by: Xia Yunhu; Ren Zongde
- Starring: Wang Ping; Shangguan Yunzhu; Lan Ma; Wu Yin
- Cinematography: Zhu Jinming
- Edited by: Fu Zhengyi
- Music by: Wang Yunjie
- Production company: Kunlun Film Company
- Release date: 1948 (China)
- Running time: 121 minutes
- Country: China
- Language: Mandarin

Myriad of Lights, also translated as Lights of Ten Thousand Homes, is a 1948 Chinese film directed by Shen Fu and starring Shangguan Yunzhu, Wu Yin and Lan Ma.

The film is selected as one of the 100 best 20th-century Chinese films by Asia Weekly. It also ranks #91 in Hong Kong Film Academy's poll of the 100 best Chinese-language films.

== Plot ==
The film begins with a small family of four (including a servant and a young daughter) in post-war Shanghai. The father, Hu Zhiqing, is a modest office worker. He finds out one day in a letter that his mother and his brother's family are coming down from the provinces to join him because living conditions are tough in the countryside. His wife cautions him that this means household expenses will increase greatly.

Spiraling inflation makes it difficult for Hu to feed the nine people in this extended family. They have to cramp themselves in a small, rented apartment. Things become even more difficult after he is dismissed from his job by Qian Jianming, a former friend. Hu cannot find a new job and his younger brother has to work odd jobs on the streets. His wife has a quarrel with his mother and then suffers a miscarriage. He is mistaken as a pickpocket and gets beaten up on a public bus. Distraught, Hu gets run over accidentally by Qian's chauffeur.

Hu lies in a hospital in a coma for days. His mother and wife search frantically for him and are reconciled in the process. As they meet again in their old apartment after Hu finds his way home, each declares that he or she has been at fault. But the film ends with Hu's realization that none of them is really at fault; it is only the hard times which are making things exceptionally difficult.

== Cast ==
- Shangguan Yunzhu as Lan Youlan
- Lan Ma as Hu Zhiqing
- Wu Yin as Old Mrs Hu
- Wang Ping as Mrs Chen
- Shen Yang as Hu Chunsheng
- Qi Heng as Qian Jianming
- Gao Zheng as Xiaozhao
- Wei Jiang as Zhu Zhihao
- Li Wanqing as Ah Zhen
