= Shu Xiuwen =

Chinese actress (1915–1969)

- 舒绣文
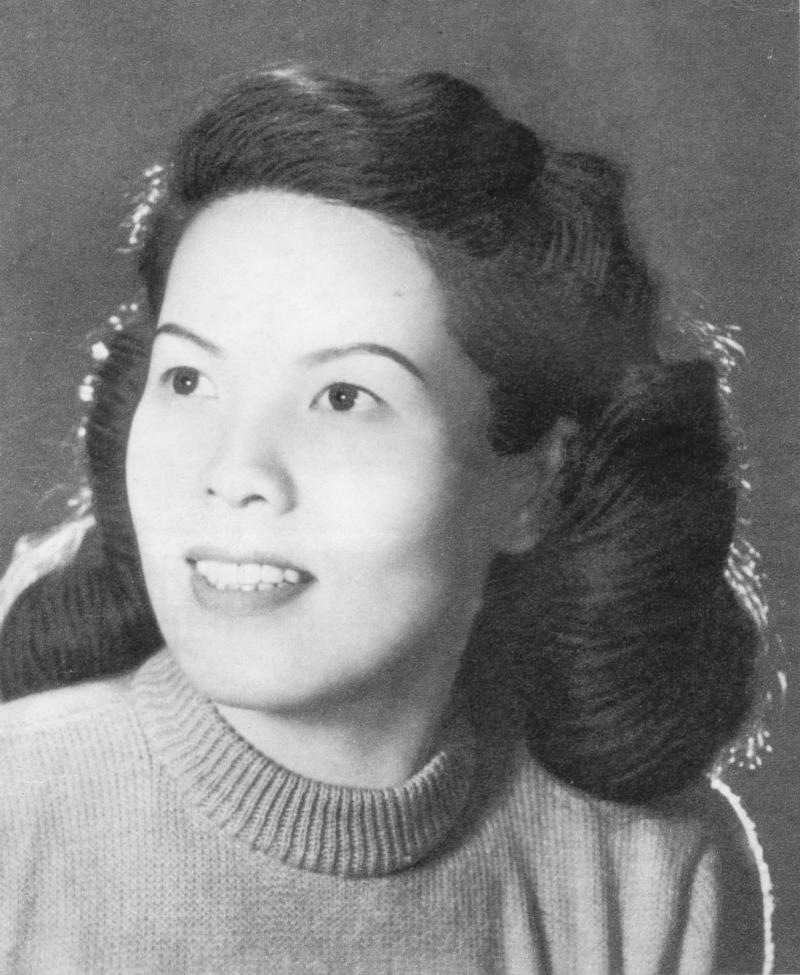
- Shu Xiuwen in the 1940s
- Born: 1915; Anqing, Anhui, China
- Died: 17 March 1969 (aged 53–54); Beijing, China
- Occupation(s): Film and stage actress
- Notable work: The Spring River Flows East; Rickshaw Boy; Guan Hanqing

Chinese name
- Traditional Chinese: 舒繡文
- Simplified Chinese: 舒绣文
Transcriptions
Standard Mandarin
- Hanyu Pinyin: Shū Xiùwén
- Wade–Giles: Shu Hsiu-wen

Shu Xiuwen (1915 – 17 March 1969), also romanized as Shu Hsiu-wen, was a Chinese film and stage actress, as well as the first voice actress in China. She grew up in poverty but made a name for herself in the drama and film industry of Shanghai before the Second Sino-Japanese War, and then in the wartime capital Chongqing. She starred in numerous films and stage plays, including her most acclaimed film The Spring River Flows East, and was recognized as one of China's top four actresses.

After the founding of the People's Republic of China in 1949, Shu was elected to the Chinese People's Political Consultative Conference (CPPCC) and the National People's Congress. However, she was severely persecuted when the Cultural Revolution began in 1966 and died in March 1969.

Shu is known for her versatility and her performances greatly influenced later generations of Chinese actors. In 2005, she was voted as one of the 100 best actors of the 100 years of Chinese cinema.

== Life ==
=== Early life ===
Shu Xiuwen was born in Anqing, Anhui Province, in 1915. She had three sisters. Her grandfather was a prominent Confucian scholar, but her family had become impoverished. When she was six her family moved to Beijing, where her father taught at a secondary school. When Shu was in high school herself, her father lost his job and she was forced to drop out to help her mother with the family's housework. Her parents both became addicted to opium and fell into debt. Her father tried to sell her to repay his debts, but she escaped and worked as an escort and dancing girl at a club on East Chang'an Street.

=== Early career ===
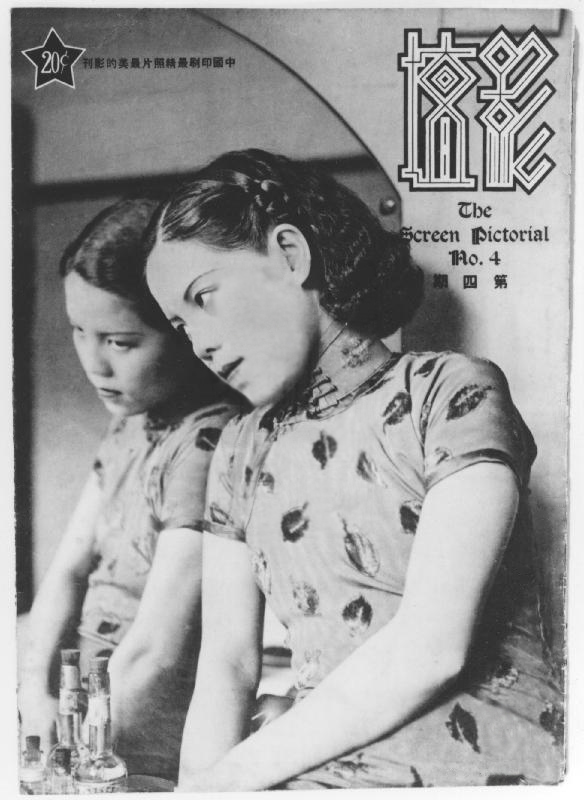
Shu on the cover of The Screen Pictorial, No. 4 (1935)

Considering her job humiliating, Shu Xiuwen—then 16 years old—left Beijing for Shanghai in the spring of 1931 to seek better opportunities. She found work teaching Mandarin at the Tianyi Film Company and served as a voice actress in Tianyi's Sing-Song Girl Red Peony (1931), China's first sound film, thus becoming China's first voice actress. She was also introduced to Chen Yumei, the star actress of Tianyi, who gave Shu a minor role in the film A Girl Named Yunlan (芸兰姑娘, 1932).

Her acting experience enabled her to find work with the Jimei Song and Dance Troupe. Although the troupe folded soon afterward, through her professional connections she was able to join the Mayflower Drama Troupe led by the prominent leftist playwright Tian Han. However, the Kuomintang government disbanded the troupe for its leftist plays and arrested Shu's friend Gui Jiangong. The experience prompted her to become actively involved in the leftist movement. When Tian Han formed the new Spring and Autumn Troupe, Shu Xiuwen soon joined it and became its main actress. She performed many stage plays such as Death of a Star, Seven Women in the Storm, and Killing of an Infant.

Following Tian Han, Shu joined the Yihua Film Company in 1932 and formally became a film actress. She starred in Tian Han's National Survival and Yang Hansheng's Raging Waves of the China Sea. She also performed with the Chinese Touring Drama Troupe. In 1934, she joined the Mingxing Film Company, and in the next three years she starred in at least 15 films before war broke out in 1937. Two films she co-starred in with Hu Die, Peach Flowers After Calamity and Fragrant by Night, were critically acclaimed. As her career blossomed, she moved her parents and sisters to Shanghai and financially supported them.

=== Wartime ===
When the Second Sino-Japanese War broke out in 1937, Shanghai's film studios were mostly destroyed in the three months of fighting known as the Battle of Shanghai. Shu joined the mass exodus of refugees for the wartime capital Chongqing, where she worked for the government-run China Film Studio. She starred in several films such as Defend Our Land, A Good Husband, and Frontier Storm. When traveling to Inner Mongolia to shoot a film, she visited the Communist base at Yan'an and was received by Mao Zedong.

From 1941 to 1946, Shu devoted herself to performing anti-Japanese and patriotic stage plays such as Thunderstorm and Sunrise by the famous playwright Cao Yu. Her acting skills established her reputation as one of China's "Four Great Actresses" of the time, together with Bai Yang, Qin Yi, and Zhang Ruifang.

Shu returned to Shanghai after the war ended in 1945. She starred in several acclaimed films, including Killer, Weakness, Your Name Is Woman, and the most celebrated film of her career The Spring River Flows East. In 1948 and 1949, during the Chinese Civil War, Shu went to Hong Kong and starred in Flowers Fall in Spring City, Way of Love, and Wild Fire, Spring Wind.

=== Communist China ===
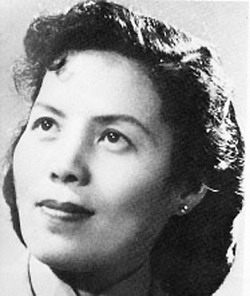
Shu Xiuwen in the 1950s

After the establishment of the People's Republic of China in 1949, Shu returned to Shanghai to work for the Shanghai Film Studio. She was transferred to Beijing in 1957 and became deputy art director of the Beijing People's Art Theatre. In this period she starred in the films Female Driver and Li Shizhen, and performed in the stage plays Rickshaw Boy and Guan Hanqing.

Shu was elected to the 1st Chinese People's Political Consultative Conference, the 2nd and 3rd National People's Congress, the executive committee of the All-China Women's Federation, and the China Federation of Literary and Art Circles. She also served as managing director of the China Theatre Association and the China Film Association.

Like many film and drama workers, Shu Xiuwen was severely persecuted when the Cultural Revolution began in 1966. She did not survive the persecution and died on 17 March 1969 at age 54 from heart failure.

== Legacy ==
Shu Xiuwen is remembered as one of the greatest actresses of her era, best known for her versatility. She was able to portray a wide range of roles both in film and on stage, including a rural woman forced to kill her newborn child because of abject poverty (Killing of an Infant), a naive but kind girl (Killer), and a polished but cruel social butterfly (The Spring River Flows East). In Flowers Fall in Spring City, she played two very different roles: a poor rural woman and her daughter who had been brought up in affluence in the big city. Her performances greatly influenced later generations of Chinese actors.

In 2005, Shu was voted as one of the 100 best actors of the 100 years of Chinese cinema.
