= Zhao Dan =

Chinese actor

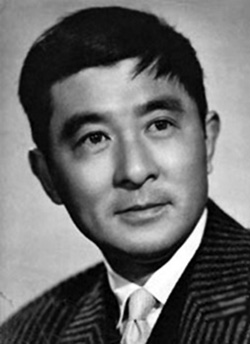
- Born: Zhao Feng'ao; June 27, 1915; Nantong, Jiangsu, China
- Died: October 10, 1980 (aged 65); Beijing, China
- Years active: 1930s–1960s
- Political party: Chinese Communist Party
- Spouse(s): Ye Luxi; Huang Zongying
- Children: 2

Chinese name
- Traditional Chinese: 趙丹
- Simplified Chinese: 赵丹
Transcriptions
Standard Mandarin
- Hanyu Pinyin: Zhào Dān

Zhao Dan (June 27, 1915 – October 10, 1980) was a Chinese film actor.

== Career ==
Zhao became famous working in the Mingxing Film Company in the 1930s including playing opposite Zhou Xuan in Street Angel (1937). After the Sino-Japanese War, Zhao began a creative relationship with director Zheng Junli, with films such as the 1948 anti-Kuomintang drama-comedy, Crows and Sparrows.

Zhao remained on the mainland following the Communist victory in 1949 and continued to make films throughout the 1950s and 1960s notably in biographical films playing historical figures of Nie Er, Lin Zexu (both directed by Zheng Junli) and Li Shizhen.

Zhao joined Chinese Communist Party in 1957. During the Cultural Revolution, he was persecuted and imprisoned for 5 years. He died of pancreatic cancer in Beijing in 1980.

== Personal life ==
Zhao was married to Ye Luxi (Rose Ye) in 1936. When he was arrested by Sheng Shicai in Xinjiang in 1939, it was rumored that he was killed. Thus Ye married the playwright Du Xuan. After the war, he was released and returned to Shanghai. He married actress Huang Zongying in 1948.

== Selected filmography ==
=== As actor ===
Year	English Title	Chinese Title	Director	Role
1933	Twenty-Four Hours in Shanghai	上海二十四小时	Shen Xiling	
1937	Street Angel	马路天使	Yuan Muzhi	Xiao Chen
1937	Crossroads	十字街头	Shen Xiling	Zhao
1947	Far Away Love	遙遠的愛	Chen Liting	Xiao Yuanxi
1947	Rhapsody of Happiness	幸福狂想曲	Chen Liting	
1949	Crows and Sparrows	烏鴉与麻雀	Zheng Junli	Little Broadcast
1949	Women Side by Side	丽人行	Chen Liting	Zhang Yuliang
1950	The Life of Wu Xun	武训传	Sun Yu	Wu Xun
1951	The Married Couple	我们夫妇之间	Zheng Junli	
1956	Li Shizhen	李时珍	Shen Fu	Li Shizhen
1958	Lin Zexu	林则徐	Zheng Junli	Lin Zexu
1959	Nie Er	聂耳	Zheng Junli	Nie Er

=== As director ===
Year	English Title	Chinese Title	Notes
1947	The Dress Returns to Glory	衣锦荣归	
1953	Bless the Children	为孩子们祝福	
1964	An Evergreen Tree	青山恋	Also known as Precious Green Mountains
