= Tao Jin (actor) =

Chinese actor and director

Tao Jin (陶金 22 January 1916 - 28 September 1986) was a popular Chinese actor of the 1940s and 1950s.
