= The Spring River Flows East =

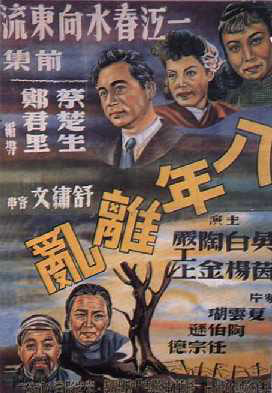
- Poster for the first part of the film: Eight War-Torn Years
- Traditional Chinese: 一江春水向東流
- Simplified Chinese: 一江春水向东流
- Hanyu Pinyin: Yī jiāng chūn shuǐ xiàng dōng liú
- Directed by: Zheng Junli; Cai Chusheng
- Written by: Cai Chusheng; Zheng Junli
- Starring: Bai Yang; Tao Jin; Shu Xiuwen; Shangguan Yunzhu
- Cinematography: Shen Xilin; Wu Weiyun; Zhu Jinming
- Edited by: Fu Zhengyi; Wu Dingfang
- Music by: Zhang Zengfan
- Production company: Kunlun Film Company
- Release date: October 9, 1947 (China)
- Running time: 190 minutes
- Country: China
- Language: Mandarin

The Spring River Flows East, also translated as The Tears of Yangtze, is a 1947 epic Chinese film written and directed by Cai Chusheng and Zheng Junli and produced by the Kunlun Film Company. It is considered one of the most influential and extraordinary Chinese films ever made, and China's equivalent of Gone with the Wind. With both films based on the story of war and chaos, they contain an epic style considered classics in the film history of both China and the United States. The Hong Kong Film Awards ranked it in its list of greatest Chinese-language films ever made at number 27. It ran continuously in theatres for three months and attracted 712,874 viewers during the period, setting a record in post World War II China. The film features two of the biggest stars of the time: Bai Yang and Shangguan Yunzhu.

The film is over three hours long and consists of two parts, Eight War-Torn Years (八年離亂) and Before and after the Dawn (天亮前後), released in separate dates in the same year, as it first premiered on October 9. It details the trials and tribulations of a family during and immediately after the Second Sino-Japanese War. Part One, Eight War-Torn Years tells the story of the early life and marriage of a young couple, Sufen (Bai Yang) and Zhang Zhongliang (Tao Jin) and the strain produced when the husband is forced to flee to Chongqing, losing contact with the family he leaves behind in wartime Shanghai. Part Two describes Zhang Zhongliang's return to Shanghai after a second marriage into a wealthy business family among whom by chance his impoverished first wife Sufen has found work as a maid.

== Plot ==
=== Part One: The Eight War-Torn Years ===
Part One, also known as Eight Years of Separation and Chaos, is about 100 minutes in length.

In Shanghai after the 1931 Mukden Incident, Sufen (Bai Yang), is a poor but honest young girl who works at a textile factory. She fancies Zhang Zhongliang (Tao Jin), a teacher giving evening classes to her fellow factory workers. On National Day, the workers put on a show at the factory for their colleagues, with Zhongliang acting as the host. Among the performances the vivacious Wang Lizhen (Shu Xiuwen), the sister-in-law of the factory manager, performs a Spanish dance to much applause. Her performance ends and Zhongliang gets up on the stage and makes a patriotic appeal to the workers. Asking them to donate to the Northeastern Volunteer Army resisting the Japanese invasion of northeast China, the audience throws money on the stage with fervor. However, the factory manager Wen reprimands Zhongliang for inciting the workers, fearing that it will get him into trouble with the Japanese. A disappointed but not discouraged Zhongliang invites Sufen to eat with him at his home, where he lives with his mother (Wu Yin). They solidify their mutual attraction, and as they embrace, he places a ring on her finger while professing his plans for a long and happy future with her. They marry and soon have a son they name Kangsheng ("to resist and to live on") in honor of the wartime sacrifices made for a better world.

However, the conflict worsens and Zhongliang joins the Red Cross. With the Japanese approaching Shanghai, it results in his medical corps being sent to the frontlines. As they will be separated, Zhongliang tells Sufen and his mother that they should stay in Shanghai. Though he suggests they go back to the countryside to his father and younger brother when things become too dangerous. Meanwhile, the well-connected Miss Wang Lizhen, leaves Shanghai for Hankou to stay with a wealthy trading tycoon, Pang Haogong and his wife after receiving a letter of recommendation from her brother-in-law. The Japanese begin bombing Shanghai and Sufen, with her mother-in-law and the baby, travel to the countryside to live with Zhongliang's father and younger brother Zhongmin. Zhongmin is a village school teacher by day and a fighter in the guerrilla resistance by night. Hearing that the Japanese are arresting the literate intelligentsia, Zhongmin and three of his friends escape into the mountains where other resistance members are just as the Japanese come to capture them.

Oppression from the Japanese soldiers towards the villagers worsens and they requisition the rice and cattle. They force the villagers to work in the rice fields with no exceptions. The starving villagers beg Zhongliang's father to use his wisdom and authority to try to convince the Japanese officers to reduce the rice levy so they will have something to eat and be able to work harder. However, the Japanese accuse the old man of inciting the villagers to rebel and they hang him while ordering that his body remain suspended as a warning. That night the guerrilla fighters, led by Zhongmin, blow up the Japanese headquarters, killing the officers, and retrieve his father's body for burial. To avoid reprisals, the fighters help the villagers escape into the mountains, but send Sufen, her child and her ailing mother-in-law, back to Shanghai by boat.

Meanwhile, Hankow also falls to the Japanese and citizens begin evacuation. Wang Lizen evacuates with the Pangs and runs into Zhongliang who also prepares with his corps. She tells him they plan to head for Chongqing and hands him a card containing her address, telling him to contact her should he also end up there. As the war progresses, the Japanese disregard the laws of war and massacre Zhongliang's medical corps. Zhongliang only survives by feigning death but is later captured and made to do forced labor by the Japanese until a vision of Sufen inspires him to finally make a successful escape. He manages to reach Chongqing, which is still under the control of the Chinese Nationalist government. Corruption there is rampant however, and he is unable to find work of any kind. He sees a notice in the paper that Lizhen has been formally adopted as a goddaughter by Pang Haogong.

Destitute and in rags, Zhongliang decides to show up at her door as a last ditch effort. Lizhen, who lives in luxury, takes him in and convinces her godfather to employ him at his company. Now given clothes, shelter and employment, Zhongliang eagerly prepares for his new job. However, he soon discovers that his new colleagues are idlers who do nothing but drink and party. Though he attempts to remain true to himself, receiving ill news from his family and the uncertain whereabouts of Sufen causes him to be discouraged. Becoming increasingly jaded and demoralized, Zhongliang (formerly a teetotaler) takes to drinking, and gradually allows himself to be seduced by Lizhen. Giving up to the luxury of Chunking, he thinks no more of his wife, son and mother. However, back in Shanghai, Sufen now works during the day in a war refugee camp while taking care of her son and ailing mother-in-law in the evenings. Despite their poor living conditions, she tries her best to support her family, hoping to reunite with her husband soon. Part One ends as a torrential thunderstorm pummels their rugged home.

=== Part Two: Before and After the Dawn ===
Part Two is about 92 minutes in length.

The film continues the saga of Zhongliang in Chongqing, where, untouched by the war, business is booming. Zhongliang wakes up next to his new love, Lizhen. The flashbacks show his mental debate about lingering upon his past, but the smile hanging on his face implies his content attitude about the present and intention to lay the past to rest. Lizhen uses her influence to have Zhongliang promoted to be Pang Haogong's private secretary. She also connives to get Pang Haogong to adopt Zhongliang, as well, which Pang Haogong agrees to if Zhongliang shows his trustworthiness by marrying into the family (入赘 Ru Zhui). Zhongliang, though despairing, nevertheless has vowed to make something of himself. He is introduced into Pang Haogong's circle of wealthy industrialists, shows talent for wheeling and dealing, and soon makes his mark as an entrepreneur. To welcome his new turning point in life, Zhongliang changes his hairstyle to "more of a bouffant" to match the latest fashion trend in the city which also foreshadows the transformation of his nature.

Back at the NO. 5 refugee center in Shanghai, the impoverished Sufen devotedly takes care of the children and writes letters to conscripted soldiers for their illiterate family members while supporting her mother-in-law and son, now a young boy, until the Japanese decide to dismantle the camp for military purposes. The soldiers force the refugees to live in an open field surrounded by barbed wire and allow them only starvation rations of rice. When one of the prisoners escapes, the others, many of them elderly women, are collectively punished by being made to stand all night in the waist-high, freezing waters of a canal.

Japan surrenders in August 1945. Zhongliang, believing his family to have died, has been adopted by Pang Haogong and has married Lizhen. He and his boss, Pang Haogong, fly back to Shanghai, leaving a reluctant Lizhen to follow them later. In Shanghai, the Nationalists have rounded up and imprisoned wartime collaborators, including Manager Wen. Zhongliang stays at the lavish home of one of Lizhen's family connections, her cousin, Wenyan (Shangguan Yunzhu). The two become lovers, to the scandal of the servants. Somewhat later Lizhen arrives from Chongqing and tension develops between the two cousins.

Postwar conditions are tough. Sufen cannot afford to pay her rent, buy food, or contact her husband whom she is sure will return, not realizing he has already been in Shanghai for two months. Their son, Kangsheng, is now nine years old and is working in the streets selling newspapers. To her mother-in-law's consternation, Sufen decides to find work as a maid, a job that her mother-in-law considers beneath people of their status, but it is that or starve. By coincidence Sufen finds work in Wenyan's household, though she is there for two days before she realizes that her husband is also staying there. The confrontation occurs when Sufen is sent to bring a tray of drinks at a National Day cocktail party. Sufen recognizes Zhongliang, as he is about to dance a tango with Lizhen. She collapses in shock, overturning the tray. Queried by Lizhen, Sufen bursts out that Zhongliang is her husband and that they have been married for ten years and have a son. She recounts her years of suffering, bringing everyone to tears. Everyone except Lizhen and her cousin, who are mortified and accuse Sufen of purposely making them lose face in front of guests. Sufen runs out of the house. While Lizhen retreats to her room where she has a fainting fit, Zhongliang runs to Lizhen's side. Lizhen, enraged, insists that Zhongliang divorce Sufen. He agrees. He now cares only for his own social position and Lizhen's welfare, while Lizhen's cousin Wenyan privately gloats over Lizhen's comeuppance.

Sufen wanders desolately in the street all night and finally returns home. A letter has come from Zhongliang's younger brother Zhongmin, announcing his marriage to his childhood sweetheart. He has been fighting in the resistance all this time. They have ousted the governor of the province, and he is happy and teaching in the countryside. Kangsheng is happy and proud of his uncle and he announces he wants Uncle Zhougmin to be his teacher, too. The contrast with her own life is too much; Sufen collapses in sobs and bursts out that she has discovered that Zhongliang is back in Shanghai and is now married to another woman and has forgotten all about them. The grandmother insists on seeing her son right away, and the three of them decide to confront Zhongliang at Wenyan's mansion.

Mortified and totally disillusioned after a chaotic farce at the mansion, Sufen runs out of the house with her son. At a quay, Sufen claims to be starving and tricks her son into buying a flatbread for her with the intention to not let him witness his mother's suicide. When Kangsheng comes back, a crowd has gathered, Sufen has drowned herself in the Huangpu River. She has left a note saying that Kangsheng is now a man and from now on he should strive to be like his uncle and not like his father. Kangshen goes to fetch his grandmother and both return to the pier to mourn Sufen. Zhongliang also arrives in a limousine with Lizhen. The grandmother, who seems to bear all the sorrows of China on her shoulders, berates her son, blaming him for Sufen's death. She brought him up to be a good, conscientious man, she says, but Sufen was more filial and took better care of her than he did. The grandmother lifts her eyes to heaven and asks when will be the end of this endless, endless suffering.

== Cast ==
- Bai Yang as Sufen (素芬), Zhongliang's wife
- Tao Jin as Zhang Zhongliang (张忠良), a night school teacher
- Shu Xiuwen as Wang Lizhen (王丽珍), Zhongliang's second wife
- Shangguan Yunzhu as He Wenyuan (何文艳), Lizhen's cousin
- Wu Yin as Zhongliang's mother
- Yan Gongshang as Zhang Zhongliang's father
- Gao Zheng as Zhang Zhongmin, Zhongliang's younger brother
- Zhou Boxun as Pang Haogong, Lizhen's adoptive father

== Title ==
Spring River Flows East derives its title from the poem "The Beautiful Lady Yu", written by Li Yu, the last ruler of the Southern Tang dynasty ("Beauty Yu" referring to Consort Yu). The poem was written shortly after the loss of his kingdom to the Song dynasty. "The Beautiful Lady Yu" is also a Cí (詞牌), a type of lyric poetry. Historically, "The Beautiful Lady Yu" was used to commemorate the death of military warlord Xiang Yu’s wife Consort Yu (虞姬). The last sentence of this poem is the most famous and is also the name of this movie. It is a famous line among ancient Chinese poems that uses water as a metaphor for sorrow and is used to express that the amount of sorrowful thought is as endless as the river water in spring.

問君能有幾多愁
How much sorrow can one man have to bear?
恰似一江春水向東流
As much as a river of spring water flowing east.

The poem is a requiem to the downfall of a ruling power, in the film, the poem is exemplified through the story. Resilience after experiencing loss, deprivation, exploitation, and mistreatment from the effects of the Sino-Japanese War, Sufen's struggles become a symbol for sorrow. This being highlighted in Part 2 through the contrast between Sufen's struggling and the luxurious life of Zhongliang.

== Production ==
“At Kunlun, production appeared to have been arranged around the director as the principal authority who delegated tasks. However, scenario writer and director committees were established as a critical forum to check the abuse of directorial power.”

The film was released on the eve of the Double Tenth in Shanghai, the anniversary of the Wuchang Uprising in 1911. The Double Tenth is shown in both parts of the film, highlighting key narrative points. During February 1947, one of the film's sponsors, Zhang Naiqi, disinvested in the film's production due to political turmoil. With filming for The Spring River Flows East halfway done, resuming and post-production work became significantly delayed.

=== Techniques ===
By using montage techniques, the editing of this film builds up stark contrast between male and female characters, clearly showing the gender confrontation to the public. While the male characters dominate the public space - rushing off to war and being present on a national level, the women are centered in a much more domestic space.

These montage techniques are utilized during the war scenes as well. Shooting a war scene on location would be too expensive, so the directors creatively used newsreel footage alongside footage shot on studio sets, finding ways through montage sequences highly influenced by Russian director Sergei Eisenstein, to re-create credible visuals within their minimalist budget. By incorporating this historical footage from the war, the film's documentary-like form is also effectively strengthened. Throughout both parts of the film, captions point out the important incidents in history. Part 1 labels the events from 1931 to 1941 and Part 2 opens with a caption signaling Japan's surrender to the Allies.

=== Political Influences ===
From April 1941 to December of the same year, a newspaper company, China Business News (Hua Shang Bao), opened its business and embarked on movie production in Hong Kong. However, during this period, Hong Kong under British control would be handed over to Japan by the government rather than to the Communist party. Therefore, British government was eager to suppress anti-Japanese criticism.

China Business News was led by the Chinese Communist Party, and issued a lot of anti-Japanese remarks. It supported several movies talking about the atrocities committed by the Japanese army by issuing positive remarks on those films. China Business News took an effort on changing Hong Kong citizens minds. However, after December 1941, the Japanese army invaded and dominated Hong Kong. China Business News soon disappeared afterwards.

With the Japanese surrender in 1945, within two years the economy was in a disastrous state and in need of recovery while Chiang Kai-shek and Mao Zedong fought for political dominance. By 1946, the nationalist state attempted to utilize the filming industry for ideological control and manipulation through post-war films by instituting film studios such as Central Film Studio 1 and 2 on Huaying's premises. In addition, three studios were established by private entrepreneurs, which were the Wenhua, Kunlun and Cathy film production companies. In 1947, the socio-political campaign through filming was unsuccessful due to factionalism and mismanagement within the Nationalist organization, along with opposition, resistance, and criticism of the prejudiced policies from the Nationalists. Kunlun studio, along with the two other studios were mostly staffed by leftists who were consciously critical of the nationalist rule. The studio's manifesto was to stand with the people. It aimed to expose and criticize the crimes of the KMT reactionary rule and the pain and persecution felt by the people under this rule, and to promote the people's road of struggle.

== Reception ==
Given the post-war economic state and the Nationalist's ideological campaign, Spring River Flows East surprisingly became the top box office film with its performance of cynicism with the Nationalist post-war disappointments. The post-war discussions in China were primarily about the complexity of political engagements and acts of treason to the country as this discourse was defined by individuals who had lived through the war in the interior. The left-wing films during this time aimed to make literature, be accessible to the ‘masses’ and also learning from the ‘masses’ which reflected it film style, putting an emphasis on narrative continuity and clarity. Spring River Flows East is one of the most famous post-war films about the Japanese-occupied life through the narratives and perspectives of the suppressed who lived during the occupation.

Due to the film's success, it was subsequently distributed by the Kunlun Film Company to Hong Kong and Singapore, where it was also positively received. In 1947, The Nationalist government's Cultural Movement Committee organized a film festival, where 11 studios took part and 22 films were submitted as nominees. Among these, The Spring River Flows East was received as the best film.

== Themes ==
"May I ask how much sorrow you can carry? It feels like the Yangtze River flowing east endlessly downstream in the spring!"

Taken from Li Yu's poem, “The Beautiful Lady Yu,” these two lines of lyrics open and are reprised throughout the epic film The Spring River Flows East. While spring usually represents a renewal of energy in a positive way, here it conveys the sorrowful emotions of a war-torn nation. As the introductory lyrics indicate, in springtime when the flow is strong, the river carries nothing but sorrow. Modernity and westernization are also incorporated in the script to show the influx of foreign influences and changes of the time.

In the final stage, the film is driven to the climax of sentiments, following the trope of the new women.

In the 1940s, Female roles played an important impact on this era's movies. A number of films’ themes were Female-themed films. Female-themed movies not only exhibit female character's life, work and relationship with male, those movies also display their emotions, psychological status and struggles in their life.

In the female emotion depictions, there are several sequences displaying Sufen's memories and emotions. For instance, she remembered the scenario when Zhang Zhongliang put a ring on her finger. Also, she suicided after knowing her husband's second wife. Those are the desperate and sorrowful emotions which moviegoers can empathize with.

Economic inequality in China is considered more as a moral issue, instead of as a societal issue.

Shots of Sufen and Zhang Zhongliang are continuously juxtaposed, highlighting their differences in economic status. This is especially apparent once Zhang makes it to Chongqing. Zhang's infidelity is not so much an ethical aspect as a portrayal of the state of intellectual confusion, sway, escape, and transformation in the 1940s, so as to reflect the humanity and existence state of the intellectuals of this era in a deeper level.

The main character Sufen embodies two contrasting characterizations during and after the Sino-Japanese War, one being the “wife in the occupied areas" (lunxian furen), who shows great perseverance and takes the full burden of family-survival during the war as the husband leaves for the front lines, and the other being the woman that lacks courage in dealing with her husband's betrayal and reacts to it with self-destruction. The type of postwar female image represented by Sufen's character at the end of the film is attributed to the sociocultural expectation for women to relinquish independence accumulated during the war and return to a static lifestyle grounded in the family household. The construction of the domestic female image was propagated primarily by contemporary male directors who promoted the ideal of tranquil housewives during the postwar reconstruction period thus crafting female figures in films with qualities such as “nurturance, humility, and charity, traits that negate the barbarism of war and underscore the notion of social stability.” Therefore, the theme of “women returning to their kitchen” and stereotypical weakness of womanhood portrayed in the media is reflected in the tragic ending designed for the character of Sufen. However, in the eyes of female audiences, the act of suicide only said more about the perspectives of postwar male filmmakers than they did about a woman's nature or role in society.

== Re-release ==
During the Hundred Flowers Campaign, The Spring River Flows East was re-released China-wide in November 1956 and was again extremely popular. It was reported that people walked for miles in inclement weather to watch the film, and many were moved to tears. It provided a sharp contrast to the worker/peasant/soldier films made in the Communist era.

A restored version was also re-released on DVD in 2017.

== Remake ==
The film was remade in 2005 as a television adaptation starring Hu Jun, Anita Yuen, Carina Lau, and Chen Daoming, but the newer version is translated into English as The River Flows Eastwards. An operatic adaptation by Hao Weiya under the title Yi Jiang Chunshui, with libretto by Luo Zhou and Yu Jiang, was premiered at the Shanghai Grand Theater in October 2014.

The film also has adaptations from Taiwan and Hong Kong. The remake in 1965 was directed by Zhang Ying, a Taiwanese director, starring Li Hong, Ko Chun-hsiung and Cheng Li-wun. The television adaptation from Hong Kong in 1983 was produced by Lai Shui Ching and starring Newton Lai, Ma Min Yee, Tsang Wai Kuen and Yuen Pui Chun.
