= Shen Fu (director) =

Chinese film director, screenwriter and actor

Shen Fu (Chinese: 沈浮; 23 March 1905 – 27 April 1994) was a Chinese film director, screenwriter and actor, born in Tianjin. During 1930s he was associated with Lianhua Film Company in Shanghai. His Myriad of Lights (1948) was selected as one of the 100 best 20th-century Chinese films by Asia Weekly. It also ranks #91 in Hong Kong Film Academy's poll of the 100 best Chinese-language films.

== Selected filmography ==
- Lianhua Symphony (1937) (director of a segment, screenplay, actor)
- Myriad of Lights (The Lights of Ten Thousand Homes) (1949) (director, screenplay)
- Crows and Sparrows (1949) (screenplay)
- Li Shizhen (1956) (director)
