= Zheng Junli =

Chinese actor and director

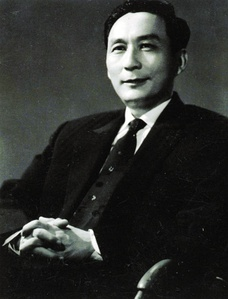
- Zheng in the 1950s
- Born: December 6, 1911; Shanghai, China
- Died: April 23, 1969 (aged 57)
- Occupations: Film director, actor

Chinese name
- Traditional Chinese: 鄭君里
- Simplified Chinese: 郑君里
Transcriptions
Standard Mandarin
- Hanyu Pinyin: Zhèng Jūnlǐ

Zheng Junli (December 6, 1911 – April 23, 1969) was a Chinese actor and director born in Shanghai and who rose to prominence in the golden age of Chinese Cinema. His films The Spring River Flows East and Crows and Sparrows are widely considered classics of Chinese cinema. He was severely persecuted during the Cultural Revolution and died in prison.

== Republic of China ==
Zheng was born into a poor family of Cantonese fruit-sellers in Shanghai. At early ages, he showed great interest in reading and art performing. In 1928, he entered the Nanguo she drama school to study under Tian Han and Ouyang Yuqian, who were progressive dramatists.

During the 1930s, Zheng was an actor under contract with Lianhua Film Company. While with Lianhua, he played a number of roles, notably as the love-interest Yu Haichou in the film New Women opposite Ruan Lingyu. By the mid-1930s, he was one of the biggest stars in Shanghai film.

Zheng's 1941 film Long Live the Nations (Minzu wansui) was the first Chinese propaganda film aimed at developing solidarity among the ethnic minorities living in China's border regions. The film was produced through the Kuomintang-controlled China Motion Picture Studio.

After the Sino-Japanese War Zheng began to focus his efforts on directing, most notably with The Spring River Flows East (co-directed with Cai Chusheng) (1947) and his anti-Kuomintang polemic Crows and Sparrows (1948). In 1957, the latter was awarded Excellent Movie Award first-class (1949-1955) by the Minister of Culture of the PRC.

== People's Republic of China ==
Zheng welcomed the establishment of the new government of Chinese Communist Party (CCP). As a left-wing director, he was at first one of the beneficiaries. He moved his family from a dilapidated dormitory in Kunlun Studio to the best residential area in Shanghai, opposite the house of Soong Ching-ling.

At 2nd meeting of 7th National Congress of the Chinese Communist Party, Mao Zedong mentioned some issues of CCP cadres after entering the cities. Zheng immediately followed the directive and made the movie The Married Couple (我們夫婦之間), starring Zhao Dan and Jiang Tianliu. It told a story of a CCP cadre ditching his original wife in his village in order to marry a girl in the city, showing his failure to resist the temptation of the "sugar-coated bullet". This movie was banned even before the public release.

Zheng was a member of Art Commission of Shanghai Film Studio and used to support the making of The Life of Wu Xun. This movie was severely excoriated by CCP authority and Zheng felt guilty about that. His former production, The Married Couple, was also criticized at this time, which exerted great pressure on the director.

In order to criticize The Life of Wu Xun, Jiang Qing and her followers went to Shandong to do research. They found another historical figure, Song Jingshi, a peasant uprising leader of the "Black Flag Army". They thus erected Song and Black Flag Army as revolutionary examples to further denounce Wu Xun. However, a dilemma was encountered by Zheng and Sun Yu during the writing of the script. In the real history, Song Jingshi eventually surrendered to Qing Dynasty; but for political purpose, Song had to be depicted as a determined revolutionary. A compromise was finally reached with Song's surrender being shown as a mere tactical move in the film. Due to the critical stance of The Life of Wu Xun, Shanghai Film Studio hoped Song Jingshi would redeem its "political mistakes". The then vice director of the movie bureau, Cui Wei, even acted as Song Jingshi himself; other famed actors and actresses were all willing to perform minor supporting roles. But Song being shown as surrendering to the Qing authority in any way was not well-received and the movie was only allowed to be released for a short period after four to five years after its completion. In the end, the film that was meant as an "atonement" got banned.

After continuous lack of success, Zheng's next two biographical pictures on Nie Er and Lin Zexu (both starring Zhao Dan) won wide acclaim, and alleviated his feeling of guilt.

Zheng was severely persecuted during the Cultural Revolution, and died in prison in 1969.

He was a delegate to Shanghai municipal People's Congress, a member of 3rd and 4th CPPCC, a councilman of China Film Association, China Playwrights Association and Shanghai Film Association.

== Film theory ==
Zheng was devoted to translating and writing works on films and plays. So far his published works include The Birth of a Role (角色的誕生) and Voice-over (畫外音), among others.

He thought his performance was rigid and not satisfactory. Thus he made great efforts to study performing theories. He first tried to translate Acting: The First Six Lessons authored by Richard Boleslavsky. Since he hadn't completed his junior high study, his English was poor. Nevertheless, he was very diligent. He did the translation relying on an English dictionary, and then double-checked the original book using a Russian-English dictionary and corrected any mistakes. After that, his English had greatly improved. He was also the first one who introduced the performing system of Constantin Stanislavski into China. Stanislavski's works were all written in Russian; Zheng thus found an English-Russian and Russian-English dictionary and translated Russian to Chinese through English. His translation of An Actor Prepares of Stanislavski, co-authored by Zhang Min, was the first systematic work on art performing in plays in China.

Zheng also authored the book Art History of World's Movies. At the time when no one in China dared to break ideological shackle and compare films of the western world with ones of the Soviet Union, it was a breakthrough by Zheng to write a chronicle of world films from a universal perspective.

== Selected filmography ==
=== As director ===
Year	English Title	Chinese Title	Notes
1947	The Spring River Flows East	一江春水向東流	Co-directed with Cai Chusheng
1949	Crows and Sparrows	烏鴉與麻雀	
1951	The Married Couple	我們夫婦之間	Also known as Husband and Wife
1955	Song Jingshi	宋景詩	Also known as The Rebels
1958	Lin Zexu	林則徐	
1959	Nie Er	聶耳	
1961	Spring Comes to the Withered Tree	枯木逢春	
1964	Li Shanzi		Zheng's last film, never released due to political reasons

=== As actor ===
Year	English Title	Chinese Title	Role
1932	Struggling	奮鬥	Xiao Zheng
1932	Wild Rose	野玫瑰	Xiao Li
1932	Pink Dream	粉紅色的夢	Li's first friend
1932	Volcanic Passions	火山情血	Song Ke
1934	The Big Road	大路	Zheng Jun
1934	New Women	新女性	Yu Haichou
1935	Song of China	天倫	Sun Yutang as an adult
1935	National Customs	國風	Chen Zuo
1936	Family Members	孤城烈女	Zhang Zhengke

== See also ==
- Cai Chusheng, frequent collaborator
- Sun Yu, director of many films Zheng acted
