= Cai Chusheng =

Chinese film director

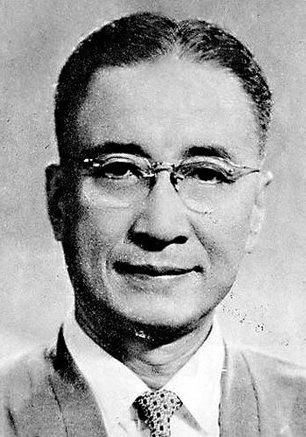
- Cai in the 1950s
- Born: January 12, 1906; Shanghai, Qing Dynasty
- Died: July 15, 1968 (aged 62)
- Occupation: Film director
- Years active: 1930s–1960s

Cai Chusheng
- Chinese: 蔡楚生
Transcriptions
Standard Mandarin
- Hanyu Pinyin: Cài Chǔshēng
Yue: Cantonese
- Yale Romanization: Choi3 Cho2 Sang1

Cai Chusheng (January 12, 1906 – July 15, 1968) was a Chinese film director of the pre-Communist era, and was the first Chinese director to win an international film award at the Moscow International Film Festival, with his film Song of the Fishermen (1934). Best known for his progressive output in the 1930s, Cai Chusheng was later severely persecuted and died during the Cultural Revolution. His ashes are kept at the Babaoshan Revolutionary Cemetery in Beijing.

== Biography ==
=== Early career ===
Cai was born in Shanghai to Cantonese parents, but raised in Chaoyang, Guangdong. He only had four years of formal education, and was home-schooled after he had spoken up for his class about the misbehavior of a teacher. While home-schooled, he studied Confucianism and practiced calligraphy and painting. Cai Chusheng initially worked in low-level positions in several small studios during the 1920s, before eventually joining Mingxing Film Company as a director's assistant to Zheng Zhengqiu, another Chaoyang-native. Cai later joined the Lianhua Film Company where he directed a handful of mainstream popular films including Spring in the South and Pink Dream (both 1932). He would not cement his reputation as a leading leftist filmmaker until after the Japanese attack in 1932, when Cai, like many of his colleagues, shifted towards increasingly progressive or leftist filmmaking. This shift can be seen in output after 1932, including the class-struggle dramas Dawn Over the Metropolis (1933), Song of the Fishermen (1934), and the proto-feminist New Women (1934), which starred Ruan Lingyu. Song of the Fishermen, for example, was a major box office success in Shanghai where it played for 87 days, and it would also become the first Chinese film to win an international prize, doing so at the Moscow International Film Festival.

=== Hong Kong and wartime ===
During the war, Cai fled first to Hong Kong, where he helped launch Mandarin-language cinema with Situ Huimin. In Hong Kong, Cai would also direct two films, including an anti-Japanese thriller. Cai was also a pioneer in making films in local dialects, and the first to make movies in Cantonese. He also made movies in Chaozhou dialect. When Hong Kong fell to the Japanese, Cai fled to Chongqing, China's wartime capital, where he joined the government-run Nationalist Central Film Studio.

=== Post-war career ===
Cai's post-war career saw him returning to Shanghai and becoming a leading member of the Lianhua Film Society (later incorporated as the Kunlun Film Company). His collaboration with Zheng Junli The Spring River Flows East (1947) also proved to be a major film and popular success in the brief "Second Golden Age" of Cinema that followed the end of the Second World War. Following the Communist revolution, Cai worked mainly in major government administrative tasks. He was also actively involved in promoting Chinese film industry and also formed an organization to monitor the quality of movies and to recognize talented artists in the industry. He did make one major post-1949 film, Waves on the Southern Shore (1963).

== Death and legacy ==
As the Cultural Revolution began to gain momentum in the late 1960s, Cai Chusheng, like many artists and intellectuals, became the target of persecution. Cai was forced to self-criticize and admit his mistakes in writing. Cai died in 1968. His ashes are now placed at the Babaoshan Revolutionary Cemetery. The house where Cai spent his youth is now a museum which is designated by the Chinese government as a certified historical attraction. Cai is honored from time to time at major events like the World Expo 2010 and film festivals.

In Stanley Kwan's 1991 biopic of Ruan Lingyu, Center Stage, Cai Chusheng is portrayed by Hong Kong actor Tony Leung Ka Fai. Ruan was one of the most prominent Chinese actresses. This film is about Ruan's life, including her suicide following the release of New Women. Cai condemned the press, which had sparked a ripple effect to raise awareness for responsible conduct in the media. Cai was also very active in promoting the social status and literacy of women: when he had time available, he would teach classes to Chinese women to improve their literacy.

== Selected filmography ==
Year	English Title	Chinese Title	Studio	Notes
1932	Spring in the South	南國之春/南国之春	Lianhua	
1932	Pink Dream	粉紅色的夢/粉红色的梦	Lianhua	Also known as A Dream in Pink
1932	Facing the National Crisis	共赴國難/共赴国难	Lianhua	Co-directed with Shi Dongshan, Sun Yu, and Wang Cilong
1933	Dawn Over the Metropolis	都會的早晨/都会的早晨	Lianhua	
1934	Song of the Fishermen	漁光曲/渔光曲	Lianhua	First Chinese film to win an award at a major international film festival
1935	New Women	新女性	Lianhua	
1936	Lost Lambs	迷途的羔羊	Lianhua	Also known as Lost Children
1937	Fifth Brother Wang	王老五	Lianhua	Segment of an anthology film, Symphony of Lianhua
1939	Orphan Island Paradise	孤島天堂/孤岛天堂	Dadi	
1940	Boundless Future	前程萬里/前程万里		
1947	The Spring River Flows East	一江春水向東流上集/一江春水向东流上集	Kunlun	Co-directed with Zheng Junli
1963	Waves on the Southern Shore	南海潮		
