= 1939 in art =

Events from the year 1939 in art.

== Events ==
- c. February 1 – Manchester painter L. S. Lowry's first solo London show, "Paintings of the Midlands" (sic.), opens at the Lefevre Gallery. In October, Lowry's mother dies without appreciating his growing success.
- March 20 – The Berlin Fire Brigade is ordered to burn around 5000 works of graphic art considered by the ruling Nazi Party in Germany to be "degenerate art" and which have little market value.
- April 24 – Royal Society of Marine Artists in the UK holds its first meeting.
- May
  - The expulsion of Salvador Dalí from the Surrealist movement is announced.
  - Release of Detective Comics #27, the debut of Batman, drawn by Bob Kane.
- June – Peggy Guggenheim closes her Guggenheim Jeune gallery at 30 Cork Street in London, abandons her plan for a modern art gallery in the city, and in August moves to Paris.
- June 30 – Degenerate Art auction held on behalf of the Nazi German authorities in Lucerne.
- July – English painters Kenneth Hall and his lover Basil Rakoczi of The White Stag group move from London to Ireland to avoid conscription.
- August 23–September 2 – Most paintings from the National Gallery in London are evacuated to Wales.
- August 25 – Ben Nicholson and Barbara Hepworth move from London to settle near St Ives, Cornwall, effectively establishing the St Ives School of abstract avant-garde artists. Soon afterwards they are joined there by Naum Gabo. In 1940 Henry Moore takes over Hepworth's London studio.
- September – Artworks from the Louvre and other French museums are evacuated to the Château de Chambord.
- October 18–November 18 – Exhibition "Contemporary Unknown American Painters" at the Museum of Modern Art (New York) introduces Grandma Moses to the public.
- November 6 – Mexican painters' Frida Kahlo and Diego Rivera's brief divorce is finalized.
- November 7 – The War Artists' Advisory Committee of the Ministry of Information (United Kingdom) is appointed, following a scheme put forward by Sir Kenneth Clark on August 29, first meeting on November 23 to decide which war artists it will employ.
- November 15 – Picasso retrospective curated by Alfred H. Barr, Jr. and staged jointly by the Museum of Modern Art (New York) and the Art Institute of Chicago opens.
- December 14 – A 'Scheme for recording changing aspects of Britain' which will employ British watercolour painters during World War II is put forward by Sir Kenneth Clark for support by the Pilgrim Trust.
- First of the Madeline books, illustrated by Ludwig Bemelmans.
- Harvey Fite begins work on his environmental sculpture Opus 40 at Saugerties, New York.

== Awards ==
- Archibald Prize: Max Meldrum – The Hon G J Bell, Speaker of the House of Representatives

== Works ==
- John Angel – Statue of Alexander Hamilton
- Maurice Ascalon – The Scholar, The Laborer, and The Toiler of the Soil (beaten copper relief sculpture for Jewish Palestine Pavilion at 1939 New York World's Fair)
- James Bateman – Haytime in the Cotswolds
- Thomas Hart Benton – Persephone
- Alexander Calder – Lobster Trap and Fish Tail (mobile)
- Leonora Carrington - Portrait of Max Ernst
- Salvador Dalí
  - The Enigma of Hitler
  - Shirley Temple, The Youngest, Most Sacred Monster of the Cinema in Her Time
- Paul Delvaux
  - Les Phases de la Lune (Phases of the Moon)
  - La rue du tramway (Street of the trams)
- Aaron Douglas – Power Plant, Harlem
- James Earle Fraser – Equestrian Statue of Theodore Roosevelt
- Jared French – Cavalrymen Crossing a River (mural) at the Lewis F. Powell Courthouse annex in Richmond, Virginia
- Leo Friedlander – Pioneer Woman (sculpture)
- Julio González – Monsieur Cactus (Cactus Man 1) (sculpture)
- Edward Hopper
  - Cape Cod Evening
  - New York Movie
- Frida Kahlo
  - The Earth Itself (later known as Two Nudes in the Forest)
  - The Two Fridas
- Fernand Léger – Adam and Eve
- David Low – Rendezvous (political cartoon)
- Musa McKim – Spanish Hill and the Early Inhabitants of the Vicinity (mural at United States Post Office (Waverly, New York))
- Marino Marini – The Pilgrim (bronze)
- Joan Miró – Constellations (series begun)
- Anne Marie Carl-Nielsen – The Young Man playing Pan-pipes on a Wingless Pegasus (monument to the sculptor's husband, the composer Carl Nielsen (d. 1931), in Copenhagen)
- José Clemente Orozco – "Hombre de fuego" (Man of Fire) (fresco in Hospicio Cabañas, Guadalajara, Mexico, 1936–39)
- Eric Ravilious – watercolours
  - Beachy Head
  - Train Landscape
  - Westbury Horse
- Percy Shakespeare – Tropical Bird House, Dudley Zoo
- Charles Sheeler – Power series (paintings)
- Situ Qiao – Guqin
- Elizabeth Wyn Wood – Welland-Crowland War Memorial (Welland, Ontario)
- Carel Willink – Château en Espagne
- Grant Wood
  - Haying
  - New Road
  - Parson Weems' Fable
  - Sultry Night (lithograph)
- Xu Beihong – Put Down Your Whip

== Births ==
- February 16 – David Griffiths, Welsh portrait painter
- February 21 – Gert Neuhaus, German mural artist
- March 17 – Jim Gary, American sculptor (d. 2006)
- March 24 – Gérard Coste, French painter and diplomat
- April 1 – Spider Martin, American photographer (d. 2003)
- April 8 – Trina Schart Hyman, American illustrator of children's books (d. 2004)
- April 25 – Patrick Lichfield, English photographer (d. 2005)
- April 27 – Erik Pevernagie, Belgian painter
- June 26 – Barbara Chase-Riboud, American visual artist, bestselling novelist and award-winning poet
- July 20 – Judy Chicago, born Judith Cohen, American feminist artist
- July 27 – William Eggleston, American color photographer
- September 6 – Brigid Berlin, American actress and artist, Warhol associate (d. 2020)
- September 30 - Anthony Green, British painter, member of the RA (d. 2023)
- October 2 – Heinz Zander, German painter and writer
- October 5 – A. R. Penck, born Ralf Winkler, German artist and jazz drummer (d. 2017)
- October 12 – Carolee Schneemann, American visual artist (d. 2019)
- December 23 – Nancy Graves, American sculptor, painter and printmaker (d. 1996)
- unknown date
  - Dia Azzawi, Iraqi painter and sculptor
  - Tom Carapic, Serbian artist specializing in found object artwork, living and working in New York City
  - Đorđe Prudnikov, Serbian painter of Russian origin

== Deaths ==
- February 16 – Phyllis Gardner, British graphic artist and dog breeder, beloved of Rupert Brooke (b. 1890)
- April 11 – Willard Huntington Wright, American art critic and detective-story writer as S. S. Van Dine (b. 1888)
- April 19 – János Vaszary, Hungarian painter and graphic artist (b. 1867)
- May 25 – Joseph Duveen, 1st Baron Duveen, English art dealer (b. 1869)
- June 3 – Sir Philip Sassoon, 3rd Baronet, English art collector (b. 1888)
- June 17 – Jean Boucher, French sculptor (b. 1870)
- June 23 – Mark Gertler, English painter (b. 1891) (suicide by carbon monoxide poisoning)
- July 4 – Louis Wain, English artist (b. 1860)
- July 21 – Ambroise Vollard, French art dealer (b. 1866)
- August 14 – Isaak Brodsky, Russian socialist realist painter (b. 1884)
- August 24 – Frederick Carl Frieseke, American Impressionist painter (b. 1874)
- August 29 – Jessica Dismorr, English Vorticist painter (b. 1885) (suicide by hanging)
- September 6 – Arthur Rackham, English illustrator (b. 1867)
- September 18
  - Gwen John, Welsh painter, sister of Augustus John (b. 1876)
  - Stanisław Ignacy Witkiewicz ('Witkacy'), Polish painter, playwright and novelist (b. 1885) (suicide)
- December 1 – Jorma Gallen-Kallela, Finnish painter (b. 1898)
- December 3 – Princess Louise, Duchess of Argyll, member of the British royal family and sculptor (b. 1848)
- December 14 – Helene Kröller-Müller, German-born Dutch art collector (b. 1869)
- December 18 – Ernest Lawson, Canadian-American painter, member of The Eight (b. 1873)
- December 25 – Margrethe Mather, American photographer and painter (b. 1886)
- December 27 – Rinaldo Cuneo, American painter (b. 1877)
- date unknown – Jane Mary Dealy, English painter and illustrator (b. 1856)

== See also ==
- 1939 in fine arts of the Soviet Union
