= Huang Zongying =

Chinese writer and actress (1925–2020)

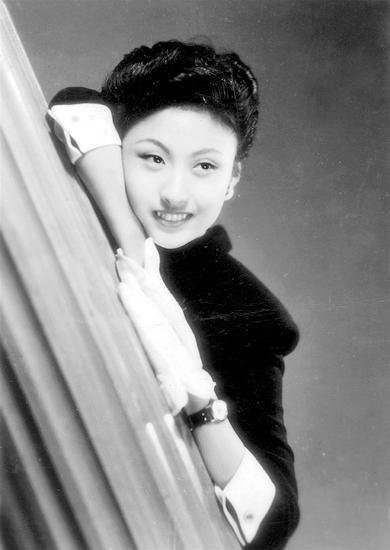
- Huang Zongying in 1940
- Born: 13 July 1925; Beijing, Republic of China
- Died: 14 December 2020 (aged 95); Huadong Hospital, Shanghai, China
- Occupations: Actress, writer
- Notable work: Rhapsody of Happiness; Crows and Sparrows; Women Side by Side
- Spouses: Yi Fang; Cheng Shuyao; Zhao Dan; Feng Yidai

Chinese name
- Traditional Chinese: 黃宗英
- Simplified Chinese: 黄宗英
Transcriptions
Standard Mandarin
- Hanyu Pinyin: Huáng Zōngyīng
- Wade–Giles: Huang^{2}Tsung^{1}-ying^{1}
- IPA: [xwǎŋ tsʊ́ŋ.íŋ]

Huang Zongying (Chinese: 黄宗英; 13 July 1925 – 14 December 2020) was a Chinese actress and writer. She starred in many black-and-white films such as Rhapsody of Happiness (1947), Crows and Sparrows (1949), Women Side by Side (1949), and The Life of Wu Xun (1950), all co-starring her third husband Zhao Dan.

She began writing film scripts in the mid-1950s, and later became an acclaimed writer of reportage literature. She was a three-time winner of the National Award for Outstanding Reportage Literature, for "The Flight of the Wild-Geese", "Mandarin Oranges", and "The Wooden Cabin".

Huang married four times. Her marriage with actor Zhao Dan lasted 32 years until his death in 1980. In her later years she married writer Feng Yidai. She had two stepchildren from Zhao's previous marriage, and adopted the two orphaned sons of singer-actress Zhou Xuan.

In 2005, Huang Zongying and Zhao Dan were both named among the "100 best actors of the 100 years of Chinese cinema". Their love story was adapted by Peng Xiaolian into two feature films including Shanghai Rumba (2006).

== Early life ==
Huang was born in 1925 to a prominent scholar-official family in Beijing, originally from Rui'an, Zhejiang Province. Her grandfather and great-grandfather were both holders of the jinshi degree, the highest degree of the imperial examination. Her father Huang Cengming was an engineer who studied in Japan, and her mother Chen Cong was a well-educated housewife. Both her parents held liberal values and allowed their children to pursue their own interests. However, her father died when she was nine and her family fell into poverty.

Strongly influenced by her eldest brother, Huang Zongjiang (黄宗江), who would become an accomplished playwright, Huang Zongying developed a passion in arts and literature. When she was nine years old, she was moved by Bing Xin's essay "To Young Readers". In response, she wrote an essay entitled "Under a Big Tree", which was published in the weekly magazine Huangjin Shidai, edited by her brother.

== Career ==
=== 1940s: acting career ===
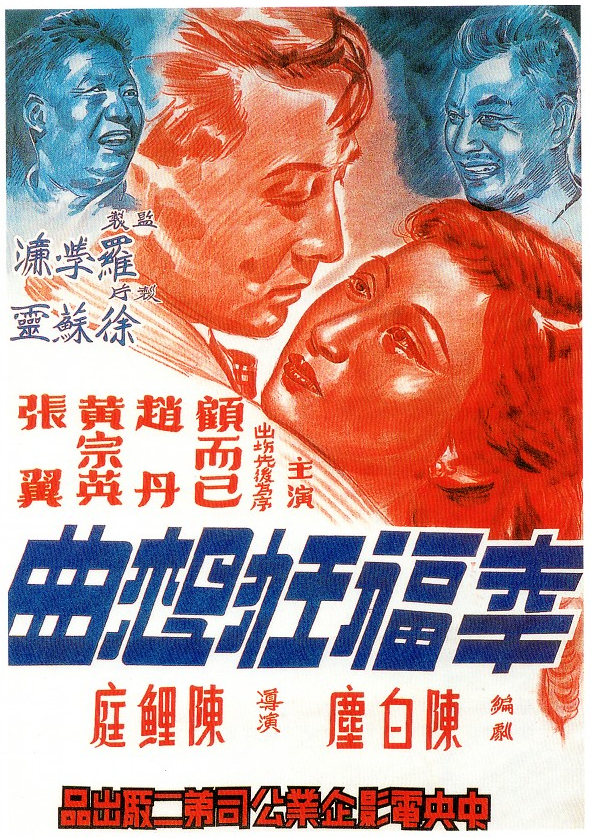
Poster of the 1947 film Rhapsody of Happiness

In 1941, Huang followed her brother Zongjiang to Shanghai where she became a stage actress in Huang Zuolin's theatre company. She debuted in Cao Yu's play Metamorphosis and rose to fame in the comedy Sweet Child.

In 1947, she made her screen debut in Shen Fu's film Pursuit before starring in her breakthrough film Rhapsody of Happiness, by the famous director Chen Liting and writer Chen Baichen. In the film she portrayed the heroine, a woman forced into prostitution and drug dealing in war-torn China. Her performance was said to be "of unprecedented artistic quality, capturing with authenticity, naturalness, and control" both the degeneracy and kindness of the character's complex nature. The male lead was her future husband Zhao Dan, China's most celebrated male actor of the time.

Soon after their marriage in 1948, Huang and Zhao both joined the Kunlun Film Studio, run by the underground Chinese Communist Party. In less than two years, she acted in several acclaimed films including Women Side by Side and Crows and Sparrows, portraying a diverse range of roles including a revolutionary, a teacher, a prostitute, and a mistress of a government official. Huang and her husband were at the forefront of an era that has been recognized as the Second Golden Age of Chinese cinema.

=== Early People's Republic of China: acting and writing ===
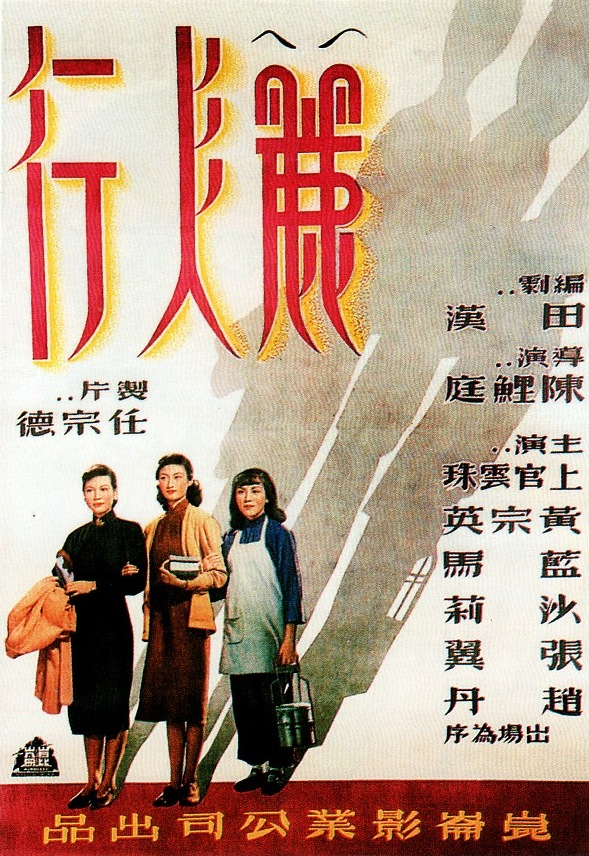
Poster of the 1949 film Women Side by Side. From left: Huang Zongying, Sha Li, and Shangguan Yunzhu

After the founding of the People's Republic of China in 1949, Huang switched to writing as her main career, which was also her childhood passion. She published her first prose collection, Onward Moves the Peace Train, in 1951, followed by two more collections, Stories of Love and A Girl. She did not play a major role after the 1953 film Bless the Children. Under Mao Zedong's directive that "the arts must serve the workers, peasants and soldiers", Chinese films became dominated by stereotypical proletarian "heroes" with few roles suitable for her. Beginning in 1954 she wrote the film scripts for An Everyday Occupation (1955) and The First Spring of the 60s.

=== Cultural Revolution ===
During the Cultural Revolution (1966–1976), Mao's wife Jiang Qing, who had been an actress in the 1930s, launched a campaign to persecute former Shanghai colleagues who were familiar with her past. Many of Huang and Zhao's friends in the film and drama industry were driven to death, including Zheng Junli, Cai Chusheng, and Wang Ying. Zhao Dan, among the first to be targeted, was imprisoned for five years, during which Huang had no idea whether he was still alive. She remained free, but was frequently targeted by the Red Guards for physical abuse. Her family, with more than ten people, lived in one small room and had to survive on only 30 yuan a month. Her own children denounced her and Zhao Dan as "counterrevolutionaries".

=== Post-Cultural Revolution: reportage writing ===
After the Cultural Revolution ended in 1976, Zhao Dan was politically rehabilitated and returned home. Huang resumed her writing and was elected to the executive committee of the China Writers Association. She focused on the reportage genre, which she had begun writing in 1963 before being interrupted by the Cultural Revolution. Instead of the famous and the successful, she chose her subjects mainly among the common people, especially intellectuals who quietly struggled for their ideals but were belittled and denounced by society. In 1977, she published her work Heart in the journal People's Literature commemorating her colleague and friend Shangguan Yunzhu, who had been persecuted to death during the Cultural Revolution. Shangguan's son Wei Ran credited the work with expediting her posthumous political rehabilitation.

Huang often applied scriptwriting techniques, such as switches and flashbacks, to her reportage, and enriched her writing with poetic lyricism. She won the National Award for Outstanding Reportage Literature three times, for her works "The Flight of the Wild-Geese", "Mandarin Oranges", and "The Wooden Cabin". Her story "The Flight of the Wild-Geese" (大雁情) has been translated into English by Yu Fanqin and Wang Mingjie.

In a 2002 article, Huang revealed a conversation she had overheard between Mao Zedong and his biographer Luo Jinan, in which Mao told Luo that if Lu Xun, the leading Chinese writer of the 1930s, had still been alive in the 1950s, he would have had to toe the official line or be held in prison.

== Filmography ==
=== Film ===
Year	English title	Original title	Role	Notes	Reference
1947	Rhapsody of Happiness	幸福狂想曲	Zhang Yuehua		
1947	Pursuit	追	Ye Wenxiu		
1948	Street and Lanes	街頭巷尾	Zhao Shuqiu		
1948	The Dawning	雞鳴早看天	Wang Guifang		
1949	Welcoming Spring	喜迎春	Tao Chenghua		
1949	Women Side by Side	麗人行	Li Xinqun		
1949	The Adventures of Sanmao the Waif	三毛流浪記	Guest		
1949	Crows and Sparrows	烏鴉與麻雀	Yu Xiaoying		
1950	The Life of Wu Xun	武訓傳	Teacher		
1953	Bless the Children	為孩子们祝福	Wang Min		
1956	Family	家	Qian Meifen		
1958	Friendly Competition	你追我趕		Scriptwriter	
1958	Ordinary Careers	平凡的事业		Scriptwriter	
1959	Nie Er	聶耳	Feng Feng		
1960	The First Spring of the 1960s	六十年代第一春		Co-scriptwriter	
1982	The Go Masters	未完の対局	Kuang Wanyi		
1988	Palanquin of Tears	Le palanquin des larmes	Judy Wang		
2017	Please Remember Me	请你记住我	Herself		

=== TV series ===
Year	English title	Original title	Role	Notes	Reference
2002	Dashilanr	大柵欄	Princess		

== Personal life ==
=== Marriages ===
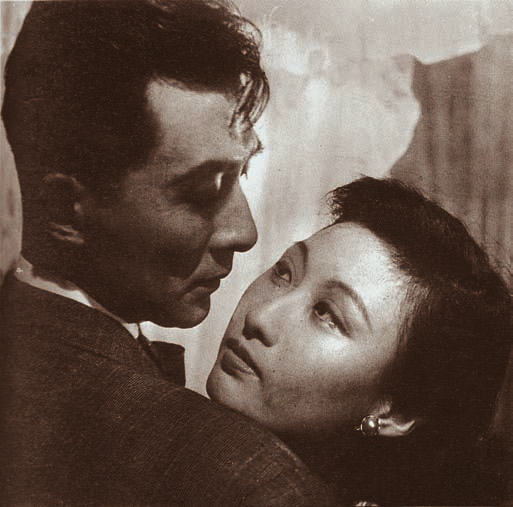
Huang Zongying and Zhao Dan in Rhapsody of Happiness (1947)

Huang Zongying was married four times. She married her first husband, the conductor Yi Fang (异方), when she was 18, without knowing he suffered from congenital heart disease. He died of a heart attack only 18 days after the wedding.

In 1946, she married the playwright Cheng Shuyao, who was from a rich but old-fashioned family which Huang found repressive. Forbidden by her husband and mother-in-law to act, she fled the family in Beijing to pursue her acting career in Shanghai. During the Second Sino-Japanese War, Zhao Dan was arrested by the Chinese warlord Sheng Shicai in Xinjiang in 1939, and imprisoned until the end of the war in 1945. Believing the widespread rumour that he had been killed by Sheng, his wife remarried. Huang and Zhao fell in love when filming Rhapsody of Happiness and wedded on New Year's Day of 1948. Numerous filmmakers and actors attended their wedding, which was presided over by the prominent director Zheng Junli. Cheng later married the actress Shangguan Yunzhu, and the two couples remained close friends.

Huang considered her 32-year marriage to Zhao Dan the most important of her life, and raised Zhao's two children from his previous marriage. According to her stepdaughter Zhao Qing, she treated her stepchildren like her own. Zhao Dan died from cancer in 1980.

In 1993, when she was 68, Huang married for the fourth time, to the writer Feng Yidai (1913–2005).

=== Adoption of Zhou Xuan's sons and lawsuit ===
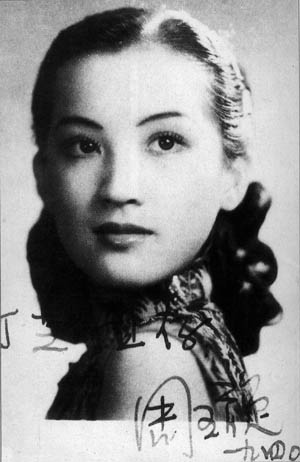
After Zhou Xuan died in 1957, Huang Zongying adopted her two sons.

In September 1957, the famous actress and singer Zhou Xuan died at the age of 39, leaving behind two young sons, Zhou Min and Zhou Wei. Huang Zongying adopted the two boys and raised them to adulthood. In November 1986, however, Zhou Wei sued Huang for his mother's inheritance worth about 120,000 yuan, which was a huge sum in 1980s China. Zhou Min, on the other hand, sided with Huang and condemned his brother, even questioning whether he was truly Zhou Xuan's son, as she had suffered mental illness before her death and the circumstances surrounding Zhou Wei's birth and the identity of his father were murky. According to Huang's court statements, she had kept Zhou Xuan's property in safe custody and did not distribute it to the brothers because of the dispute between them.

In December 1988, the Shanghai Intermediate People's Court ruled that Zhou Wei was Zhou Xuan's biological son and entitled to half of her inheritance. It also ruled that Huang had violated Zhou Wei's rights when she failed to distribute to him Zhou Xuan's property or disclose details about the property when he reached adulthood. The court ordered Huang to pay Zhou Wei 80,000 yuan.

=== Death ===
Huang died of illness at Huadong Hospital on the morning of 14 December 2020.

== Legacy ==
In 2005, the centenary of Chinese cinema, the China Film Association organized a vote for China's best actors in history. Huang Zongying and her husband Zhao Dan were both named among the "100 best actors of the 100 years of Chinese cinema".

In 2006, Peng Xiaolian directed the film Shanghai Rumba which is loosely based on the love story of Huang Zongying and Zhao Dan, starring Yuan Quan and Xia Yu. In 2017, Peng directed another feature titled Please Remember Me which also highlights their relationship. Huang Zongying appears as herself in this film.

Actress Yu Hui portrayed Huang Zongying in the 2010 TV series Zhao Dan.

== General bibliography ==
- Lee, Lily Xiao Hong (1998). Biographical Dictionary of Chinese Women: The Twentieth Century, 1912-2000. M.E. Sharpe. ISBN 978-0-7656-0798-0.
- Song, Yuwu (5 July 2013). Biographical Dictionary of the People's Republic of China. McFarland. ISBN 978-1-4766-0298-1.
- Zhang, Jie (1983). Seven Contemporary Chinese Women Writers. Translated by Gladys Yang. University of Washington Press. ISBN 978-0-2959-6017-3.
