= Chen Liting =

Chinese playwright and film director

- 陈鲤庭
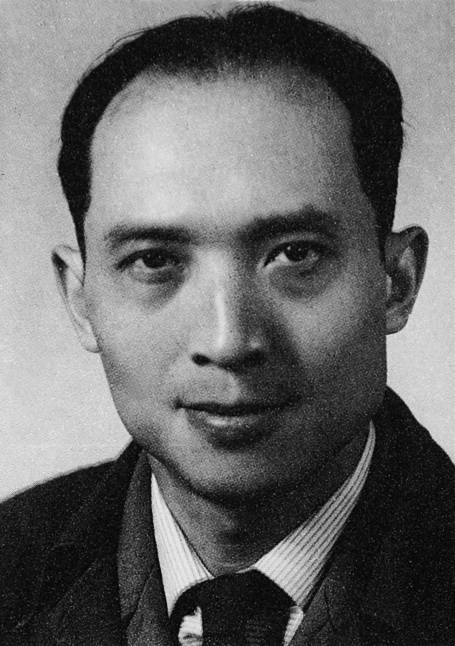
- Born: 20 October 1910; Shanghai, China
- Died: 27 August 2013 (aged 102); Shanghai, China
- Other name: Chen Sibai (陈思白)
- Education: Daxia University
- Occupations: Playwright, director, screenwriter, film theorist
- Notable work: Put Down Your Whip; Qu Yuan; Far Away Love; Women Side by Side
- Spouse: Mao Yinfen
- Children: Chen Maoni

Chen Liting (Chinese: 陈鲤庭; pinyin: Chén Lǐtíng; 20 October 1910 – 27 August 2013) was a Chinese playwright, drama and film director, screenwriter, and film theorist. He was one of the most prominent film directors and screenwriters in pre-Communist China, together with Shi Dongshan, Cai Chusheng, and Zheng Junli. His most famous film was Women Side by Side (1949).

Chen was abandoned as an infant, and then lost both foster parents during early childhood. Before becoming a film director, Chen worked mainly in drama. His patriotic play Put Down Your Whip was highly influential and performed countless times during the Japanese invasion of China. During the war he also made a famous staging of the play Qu Yuan, and wrote one of the first Chinese books on film theory.

After the early 1950s, Chen's attempts at filmmaking were repeatedly thwarted by the PRC government for political reasons. He worked as general manager of Tianma Film Studio before being imprisoned during the Cultural Revolution. After his rehabilitation at the end of the period, he spent three years on the historical film Da Feng Ge, but retired after that film was also cancelled due to politics.

== Early life ==
Born in Shanghai on 20 October 1910, Chen Liting was abandoned as an infant and adopted by foster parents. However, he lost his adoptive father at the age of four, and three years later his adoptive mother also died. Chen was brought up by his uncle, the brother of his adoptive father. He attended a boarding school in Jiangyin at the age of 12, and in 1924 entered Chengzhong Middle School in Shanghai.

As a high school student at Chengzhong, Chen was influenced by the post-May Fourth surge of modern drama. In 1928, he entered Daxia University (a predecessor of East China Normal University) in Shanghai, where he translated, directed, and acted in The Rising of the Moon, a play by the Irish dramatist Lady Gregory. It was the first Chinese production of the play.

== Put Down Your Whip ==
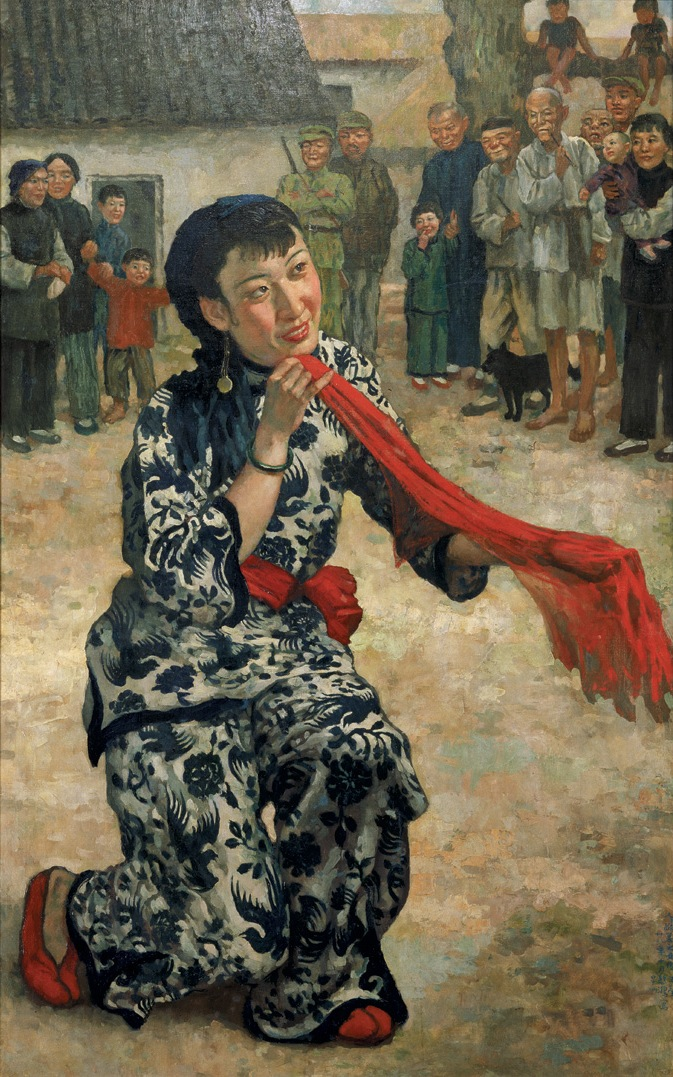
1939 painting Put Down Your Whip by Xu Beihong, depicting Wang Ying's performance of the play.

After university, Chen worked as a primary school teacher in rural Nanhui County outside of Shanghai. In late 1931, he wrote the patriotic play Put Down Your Whip (also translated as Lay Down Your Whip), inspired by Meiniang, an earlier play by Tian Han. It became extremely influential and was staged countless times throughout China during the Second Sino-Japanese War. The play was staged both by amateur performers as well as famous actors. The actress Wang Ying even performed an English version of the play in the White House for President Roosevelt and his wife. The future Madame Mao, then known as Li Yunhe, was also among its many performers. The play has been described in Chinese media as a "spiritual atomic bomb" against Japanese invaders. It also inspired famous paintings by artists Xu Beihong and Situ Qiao.

== Second Sino-Japanese War ==
Chen returned to Shanghai in 1932, where he wrote film reviews and translated Soviet books on filmmaking into Chinese. After the Japanese invaded China in 1937, Chen joined the resistance movement, serving as the leader of the fourth brigade of the Shanghai Salvation Drama Troupe, which performed numerous patriotic street plays including Put Down Your Whip. The troupe fled Shanghai before it fell to the Japanese, traveling and performing for the next three years under harsh conditions through central and southwest China.

In 1941, Chen arrived in Chongqing, China's wartime capital, where he joined the China Film Studio and the Central Cinematography Studio run by the Nationalist government. However, he mainly worked in theatre, directing plays written by Wu Zuguang, Xia Yan, and Chen Baichen. His most impressive wartime contribution was the staging of Qu Yuan, a famous 1942 play by Guo Moruo. In 1942, he also published Rules of Cinema, which is considered the first comprehensive Chinese book on film theory.

== Between WWII and 1949 ==
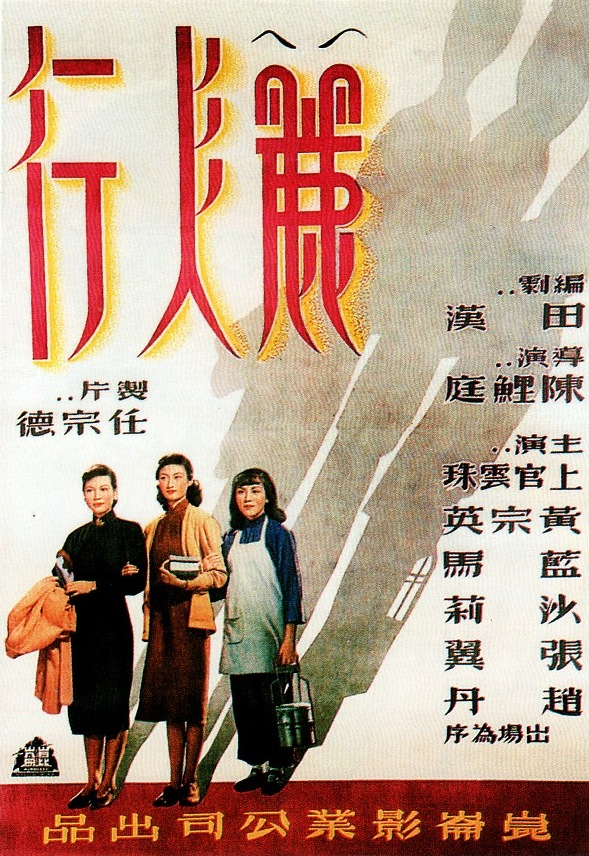
Film poster for Women Side by Side

After the Japanese surrender in 1945, Chen returned to Shanghai. He joined the China Film No. 2 Studio that was newly established by the Nationalist government. He wrote and directed the film Far Away Love, whose premiere in Shanghai's Huanghou Theatre on 18 January 1947 was considered a landmark event in postwar Chinese cinema. The film starred prominent actors and actresses such as Zhao Dan, Qin Yi, and Wu Yin, and the Ministry of Defence put uniformed soldiers under Chen's command for the filming. It was the first in a series of controversial epics on the social turmoil caused by the war. In late 1947, he made another film Rhapsody of Happiness, written by Chen Baichen.

After moving to the Kunlun Film Company, a new private studio, Chen directed Women Side by Side (also translated as Three Women or Female Fighters) in early 1949. Chen and the famous playwright Tian Han cowrote the screenplay. The film is his most famous and it is considered his masterpiece.

== People's Republic of China ==
After the founding the People's Republic of China in 1949, Chen directed two more films: Inescapable (1950) and Work Is Beautiful (1951). But he worked mostly in administrative positions, serving as a member of the National People's Congress, and general manager of Tianma Film Studio from 1957 until 1966.

In the 1950s Chen was appointed director for the upcoming film Li Shizhen. However, due to his insistence that the director, rather than government administrators, have artistic control, he was dismissed and the film was directed by his friend Shen Fu.

In the early 1960s, Chen spent three years preparing to make a film about the life of Lu Xun, starring Zhao Dan, Yu Lan, and Sun Daolin, but the film was cancelled by the Shanghai's Communist Party Chief Ke Qingshi for political reasons.

Like many other intellectuals, Chen was imprisoned during the Cultural Revolution (1966–76). After being rehabilitated at the end of the period, Chen returned to work for the Shanghai Film Studio, where he was responsible for artistic quality. He and Chen Baichen worked together for three years to make the historical film Da Feng Ge, based on the Han dynasty palace intrigues of Empress Lü after the death of Emperor Gaozu. However, the film was again cancelled by high-ranking politicians, as it was reminiscent of the political struggles after the death of Chairman Mao Zedong. Chen Baichen had a heart attack on hearing news of the cancellation, while Chen Liting, then almost 70 years old, retired from filmmaking.

In 2008, Chen Liting's biography by Xia Yu (夏瑜), titled Far Away Love after his film, was published by China Film Publishing House (ISBN 9787106029890). He was awarded a prize by Chinese President Hu Jintao for making "exceptional contributions to the art of drama".

On the morning of 27 August 2013, Chen Liting died at Huadong Hospital in Shanghai at the age of 102.

== Family ==
Chen Liting married Mao Yinfen (毛吟芬) during the Great Leap Forward. After nearly 40 years of marriage, she died on 18 September 1998. The couple had one child, a daughter named Chen Maoni (陈毛妮), who emigrated to the United States.
