= Sun Duoci =

Chinese artist

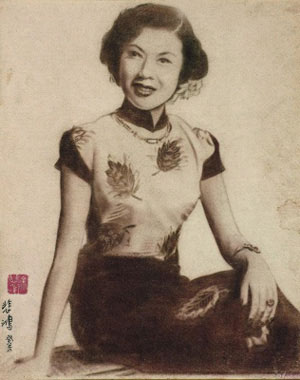
- Portrait by Xu Beihong
- Born: Sun Yunjun; 1912; Shou County, China
- Died: March 1975 (aged 62–63); Los Angeles, US
- Known for: painting
- Spouse: Xu Shaodi
- Partner: Xu Beihong

Sun Duoci (Chinese: 孙多慈; 1912 – March 1975) was a Chinese artist. Famous for her oil paintings, sketches and ink and wash works, she was an accomplished artist, as well as a calligrapher and writer. One of her pieces has sold at auction for more than $100,000. She was taught by the well-known artist Xu Beihong, who regarded her as a "painter of genius" and had an affair with her.

== Life ==
Sun was born in Shou County, Anhui province in 1912 to educated and middle-class parents. Her original name was Sun Yunjun (Chinese: 孙韵君). Her grandfather Sun Nai was a key minister in the late Qing dynasty. He was the first minister of education and founded the Beijing Normal University (the predecessor of Peking University).

Her father, Sun Chuan-yuan, was an outstanding scholar in the democratic revolution of the late Qing dynasty. He served successively as the secretary of Sun Chuanfang and the standing committee member of the Kuomintang in Anhui province. Her mother ran a girls' school.

Sun had originally intended to study literature after completed her schooling at Anqing Girls School but she failed the entrance examination National Central University. In 1930, Sun Duoci audited classes in the fine arts department of Nanjing Central University during which time she was introduced to another famous painter, Zong Baihua. who was impressed by her talent. She took lessons from Xu Beihong. The art professor with a wife and family regarded Sun as a "painter of genius". He admired her work and invited her to pose for paintings. Xu shared the news of his new love with his wife Jiang Biwei in 1930 who decided to not make this an issue (Jiang was betrothed to someone else before she eloped with Xu). Xu was now a Professor of Art at National Central University.

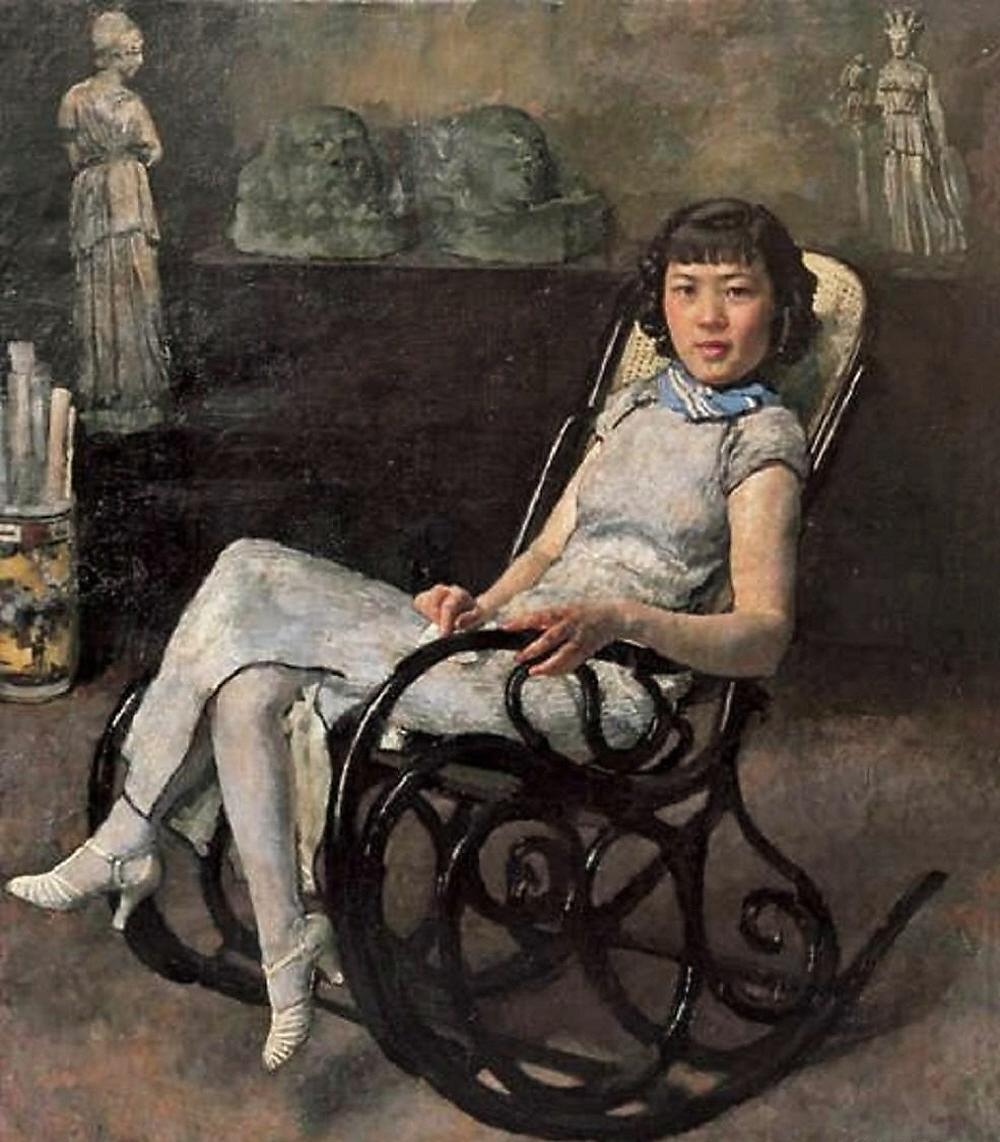
A Portrait of Sun Duoci by Xu Beihong

Sun became a full-time student with Xu Beihong in 1931 and their established affair was well known. There were complaints about the extra attention that she got from her teacher and of how they both ignored the rules concerning male visitors to the university's female dormitory. Sun was obliged to stay with her aunt in Anqing and not live at the university. However, she continued to attend lectures whilst Xu Beihong travelled abroad in January 1933. After Xu returned, he and Sun both participated in trips to sketch at Huangshan, but their behaviour created gossip. Jiang Biwei, mother to Xu's two children, was so annoyed that she destroyed all of her husband's work that featured Sun. The controversy resulted in Sun leaving the university, but Xu Beihong did not leave his family.

The status of their affair has been questioned in later accounts, as Xu's second wife, Liao Jingwen, wrote in her biography that was never any improper relationship between Sun and her husband. Instead, Liao stated that the gossip was mainly spread by Zhang Daofan, who wanted to separate Jiang Biwei from her husband.

Sun returned to her old school and began teaching but without her degree. Xu and his partner finally agreed privately to separate in 1935. Sun published her first book Sun Duoci Sketches in 1936.

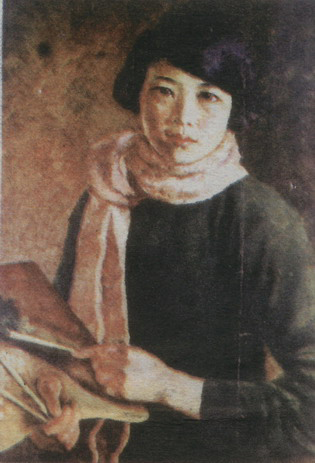
Self-Portrait of Sun Duoci

The outbreak of the Second Sino-Japanese War necessitated in 1938 that Sun and her family should move to Changsha and here she again met Xu. Xu abandoned his wife and two children, and arranged for Sun's whole family to move to Guilin where she worked as a civil servant. Xu, who was now a nationally well known painter, announced publicly in the newspaper Central Daily News that he would no longer live with his wife. Xu sent a go-between to ask her father for permission to marry. Her father refused and much to Sun's later regret she decided to accede to her father's wishes. Sun and her family moved again to Lishui, Zhejiang province, where the 29-year-old Sun married provincial education minister Xu Shaodi as his second wife. Xu Shaodi hired her as a lecturer at the University of British Arts and an associate professor at the National Hangzhou Art College. He helped her launch exhibitions in Shanghai in 1947 and moved her to Taiwan in 1949. Sun went on to study at Columbia University in the United States and then went to the National Academy of Fine Arts in France. She continued to correspond with her former lover Xu Beihong. Xu was said to have memorized poems that he sent her.

In 1948 Sun and her husband moved to Taiwan where she taught at the art department of National Taiwan Normal University . She won the "Taiwan Ministry of Education" Fine Arts Award in 1957.

She later moved to the United States and lived with a physicist and art lover Wu Jianxiong. She was also in close contact to the oil painter Wang Shaoling who lived in New York and was a friend to both Sun and Xu. It was at an art workshop in New York that she heard of Xu Beihong's sudden death in 1953. She wore mourning for three years, an unusually long period.

In March 1975, she died at the age of 64 in Los Angeles of breast cancer.

== Works ==
"Spring Dawn on Xuanwu Lake"

"Self-Portrait of Sun Duoci"

1930, Sketch "The Swab Bottle"

"Shi Xiao Gong"

1934, "The lion"

1961, Oil Painting "Thai Princess"

"Tian Wen"

"The Contemplator"

"Farming"

"Sister"

== Legacy ==
Her work "'Landscape; Lady" sold at auction for over $110,000 in 2014.
