= Far Away Love =

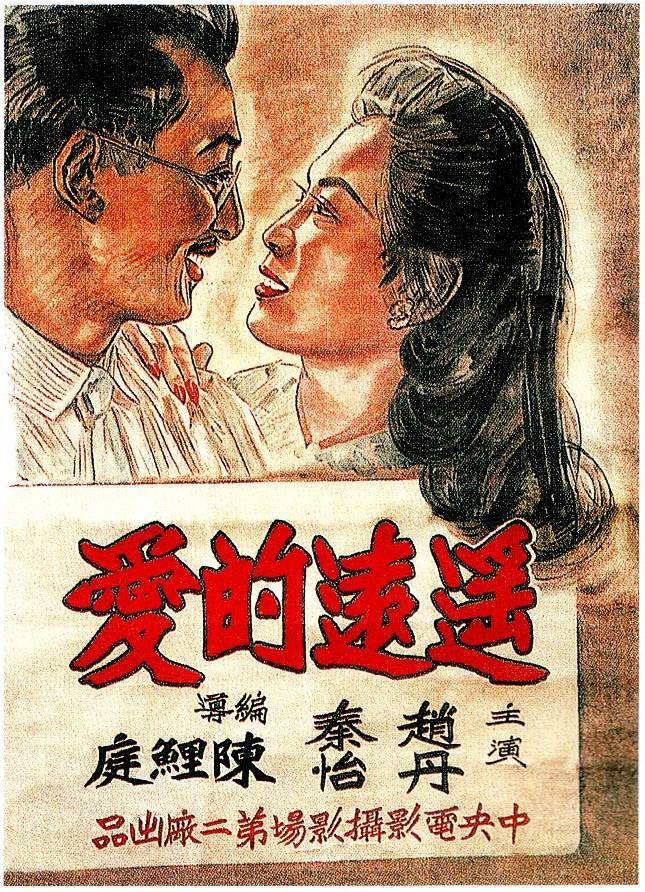
- Film poster
- Directed by: Chen Liting
- Written by: Chen Liting or Xia Yan
- Starring: Zhao Dan; Qin Yi
- Cinematography: Wu Weiyun; Zhu Jinming
- Production company: China Film No. 2 Studio
- Release date: 18 January 1947
- Running time: 128 minutes
- Country: China
- Language: Mandarin

Far Away Love (Chinese: 遙遠的愛; pinyin: Yáoyuǎn de Ài), also translated as Love of Far Away and Remote Love, is a 1947 Chinese film directed by Chen Liting. Made during the Republican era, it was produced by the state-owned China Film No. 2 Studio, and stars prominent actors and actresses Zhao Dan, Qin Yi, and Wu Yin. The film was well received, and its premiere in Shanghai is considered a landmark event in postwar Chinese cinema.

The film's screenplay is officially attributed to director Chen Liting, but according to Chen himself, it was in fact written by the leftist dramatist Xia Yan, whose authorship was concealed for political consideration.

== Plot ==
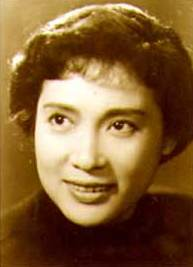
Qin Yi

After university professor Xiao Yuanxi 萧元熙 (Zhao Dan) breaks up with his girlfriend, he finds his maidservant Yu Zhen 余珍 (Qin Yi) an attractive, though unpolished, woman. He decides to transform Yu into his ideal woman. He teaches her modern etiquette and customs, and with his encouragement, Yu develops into an independent-minded modern woman. The two become married.

After the January 28 Incident in 1932, Yu Zhen wants to volunteer to care for the Chinese soldiers and refugees wounded in battle against the Japanese invaders, but is stopped by her husband. Yu later gives birth to a son, and Xiao hopes to have an ideal family life.

After the eruption of the Battle of Shanghai in 1937, Xiao flees Shanghai for Hankou in central China, while Yu insists on staying behind to help the war refugees. Yu eventually evacuates Shanghai, but on the way to Hankou her son dies in a Japanese bombing raid. The loss further steels Yu Zhen's mind and she joins the army.

When Yu finally reaches Hankou and reunites with Xiao, the couple have grown irreparably distant. Yu Zhen decides to leave Hankou for the frontline, whereas Xiao laments the transformation of his wife and turns against women's liberation.

As the Japanese army advance toward Hankou, Professor Xiao is escorted toward the interior. He unexpectedly meets Yu Zhen again, but Yu is now a completely different person. Xiao watches as his wife heads for the distant battlefront.

== Authorship ==
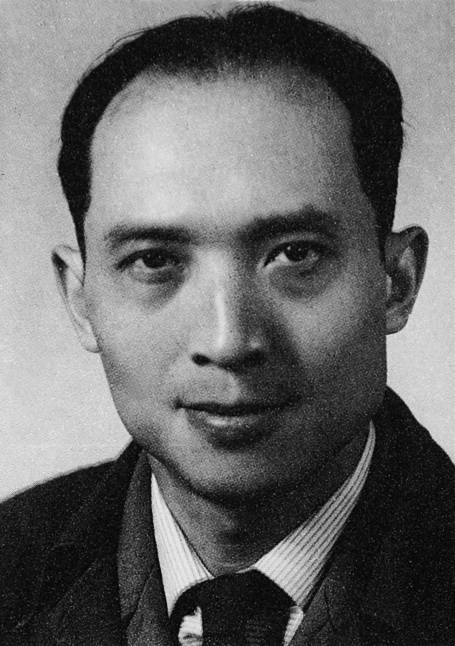
Director Chen Liting

The screenplay of the film is officially attributed to the director Chen Liting, but according to Chen himself, it was actually written by the leftist playwright Xia Yan. Xia and Chen were both prominent dramatists who had collaborated many times. As Xia had joined the Communist Party in 1927, whereas the China Film No. 2 Studio was owned by the Kuomintang government, enemy of the Communists, Xia Yan's authorship had to be concealed. However, in Xia Yan's own autobiography, he states that he did not write any screenplay between 1937 and 1949.

== Production and reception ==
Far Away Love was the first in a series of Chen Liting's epic films on the social turmoil caused by the Sino-Japanese War. The production was supported by the Ministry of Defence of the Nationalist government, which put uniformed soldiers at Chen Liting's disposal.

The film was well received. Its premiere in Shanghai's famous Huanghou Theatre on 18 January 1947 was considered a landmark event in postwar Chinese cinema. After Far Away Love, Chen made two more films — Rhapsody of Happiness (1947) and Women Side by Side (1949) — before the Communists won the civil war and took over mainland China in 1949.

Chen Liting's biography, written by Xia Yu and published in 2008, is entitled Far Away Love after the film (ISBN 9787106029890).

== See also ==
- List of Chinese films of the 1940s
