= Put Down Your Whip =

1931 play by Chen Liting

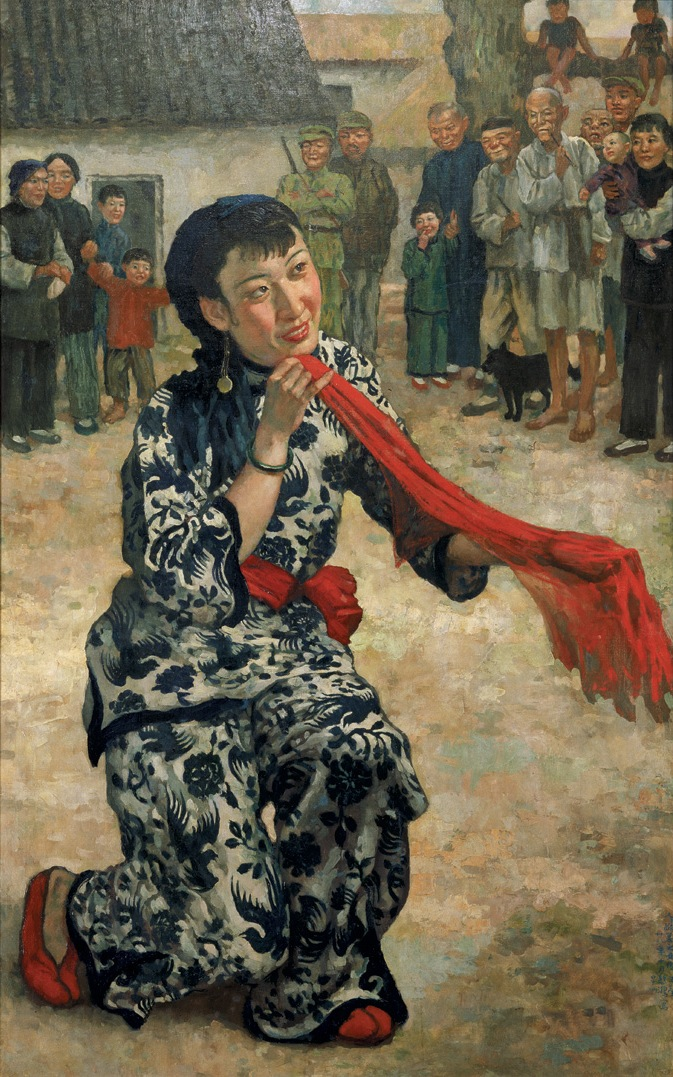
- Xu Beihong's 1939 oil painting of Wang Ying's performance of the play.
- Written by: Chen Liting
- Original language: Chinese
- Setting: Manchuria

Premiere
- Date premiered: 10 October 1931
- Place premiered: Nanhui County

Put Down Your Whip, also translated as Lay Down Your Whip (Chinese: 放下你的鞭子; pinyin: Fàngxià nǐde biānzi), is a 1931 Chinese street play written by Chen Liting during the Republican era, who drew inspiration from the earlier play Meiniang by Tian Han.

Originally an anti-government play, it was adapted to take on an anti-Japanese theme after growing Japanese aggression against China. It became the most influential street play during the Second Sino-Japanese War, and was performed countless times throughout China, and even in the White House for President Roosevelt by the actress Wang Ying. The future Madame Mao was also among its many performers.

Wang Ying's performance of Put Down Your Whip inspired Xu Beihong's eponymous painting, which in 2007 set an auction price record for Chinese paintings.

== Plot ==
=== Original version ===
A young girl named Fragrance (Xiang Jie) and her old father are poor and homeless street performers. Fragrance sings the folk song "Fengyang Flower-Drum" and does acrobatics on the street. She performs badly because she is weak from chronic hunger. Angry with his daughter's poor performance, the old man raises his whip to punish her. A young man, who is an actor in disguise, charges out from the audience, shouting "Put down your whip!" He scolds the old man for abusing his own daughter. Unexpectedly, Fragrance defends her father, and recounts her family's plight: they are refugees who have escaped flood, exploitative landlords, and tyrannical government of their hometown. The spectators are deeply moved by her misfortune. At the end, the young man turns to the spectators and exhorts them to resist the oppressive Kuomintang government: "We must resist those who coerce us to live a life of starvation and homelessness."

=== Later development ===
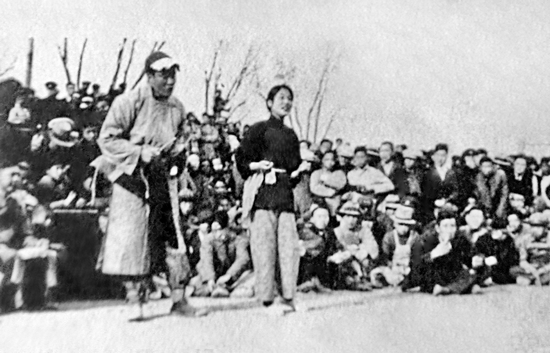
Zhang Ruifang and Cui Wei performing the play.

After increasing Japanese encroachment into north China, and especially the December 9th Movement of 1935, the play was adapted to take on an anti-imperialist and anti-Japanese theme. Instead of escaping from government oppression and flood, Fragrance and her father now escape the brutal Japanese occupation of Manchuria; and instead of appealing to the audience to fight against the government, the young man urges his compatriots to unite and defend the country against Japanese invasion, or "we will soon meet the same fate as our countrymen in Manchuria." The theme song was also changed to the "September Eighteenth Melody" lamenting the September 18 Incident of 1931 when Japan invaded and occupied Manchuria. Other patriotic songs including the "March of the Volunteers", which later became the national anthem of the People's Republic of China, were also used. The location of Fragrance's hometown kept changing as new places became devastated by the Japanese invaders. After the 1937 Nanking Massacre, the fallen Chinese capital Nanking would become her hometown.

== Reception ==
The play was written by Chen Liting, then a 21-year-old primary school teacher in Nanhui County outside of Shanghai, drawing inspiration from Tian Han's play Meiniang. Chen did not put his name on the script, however, because of the strong anti-government overtone in the original play.

The play was a failure when it debuted on 10 October 1931 in Nanhui. But after its adaptation to a patriotic anti-Japanese play, it became the most influential street play of the Sino-Japanese War, and was performed countless times throughout China during the war. The play was frequently staged by amateur performers as well as many famous stars. The great actress Wang Ying even performed an English version of the play in the White House for President Roosevelt, first lady Eleanor Roosevelt, and many diplomats. The future Madame Mao, then known as Li Yunhe, was also among its many performers.

Put Down Your Whip has been described in Chinese media as a "spiritual atomic bomb" against the Japanese invaders.

== In art ==
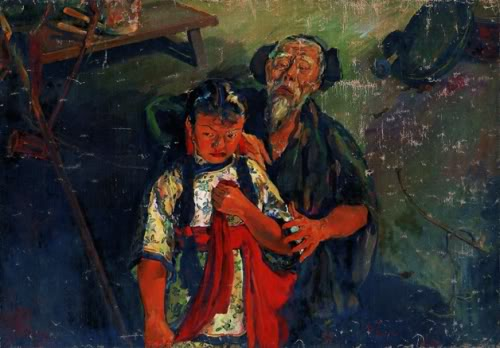
Situ Qiao's 1940 oil painting portraying Wang Ying's performance of the play.

In October 1939, Wang Ying performed Put Down Your Whip in Singapore. Artist Xu Beihong, who was a friend of the actress, painted a life-size portrait of her performing the play. In April 2007 the painting was sold in auction for US$9.2 million, setting a record for the highest auction price ever paid for a Chinese painting.

Artist Situ Qiao also saw Wang Ying's performance in Singapore and painted his version of the play in 1940, which has become the painter's most famous work.
