= Chang Tao-fan =

Chinese politician

- 張道藩
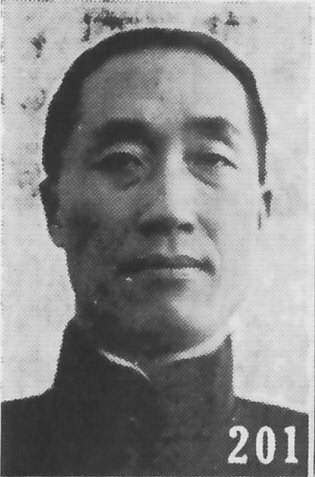
- Chang Tao-fan as pictured in The Most Recent Biographies of Chinese Dignitaries
- Born: 12 July 1897; Guizhou, Qing China
- Died: 12 June 1968 (aged 70); Taipei, Taiwan Province, Republic of China
- Education: Tianjin Nankai High School; Slade School of Fine Art; University College London; École des Beaux-Arts

Chang Tao-fan (Chinese: 張道藩; pinyin: Zhāng Dàofān; 12 July 1897 – 12 June 1968) was a prominent figure and long-time central member of the Kuomintang. He was the fourth President of the Legislative Yuan, and former President of Broadcasting Corporation of China.

== Life ==
Chang was born in Kuichou (current Guizhou), China. In his early years, he went to Tianjin to live with his relative there, and graduated from Tianjin Nankai High School. When Chang was a student he was very active in politics, and joined the Chinese Revolutionary Party.

In 1919, Chang went to study in Europe with the financial aid from then Chinese government. Chang spent three years in London at Slade School of Fine Art, an art school of the University College London. Chang also spent more than one year in Paris at the École des Beaux-Arts. He married a French woman, Suzanne Grimonprez, in 1928 although he had met and admired Jiang Biwei, but she was the partner of the artist Xu Beihong. According to Xu's second wife, Liao Jingwen, Chang spread gossip about Xu having an affair with the student and artist, Sun Duoci, in order to drive a wedge between the couple.

In 1937, he was exchanging letters with Jiang Biwei who was now single, as her partner had fallen for his student, the painter Sun Duoci. Chang knew that the Japanese were thought to be about to bomb Nanjing and he arranged for Jiang Biwei to escape to Chongqing. Here, they could correspond and secretly see each other but she could not appear as his consort if he was on official business. (Jiang Biwei was married to a man she had abandoned to live with Yu). Chang was a married man and the vice-minister of education. He arranged for Jiang to be given a job. Chang adopted Biwei's daughter, Lilian, or Lilian was Chang and Biwei's daughter outside wedlock. Lilian was raised by Chang's wife Suzanne.

Chang's French wife was a difficulty in Chinese society and Chang sent her abroad for some years. Chinese students who had brought back foreign wives were considered foolish.

== Career ==
=== Before 1949 ===
Chang had been a senior and central member of the Kuomintang for a long time, so he is considered as belonging to the central club clique (CC Clique).

From 1923 to September 1926, Chang was a head of the Kuomintang London Branch.

From January 1928 to 1930, Chang was the Secretary-General of the Nanjing Government.

From August 1928 to 1930, Chang was Provost of National Tsing Tao University (current Qingdao University) in Shandong province.

From December 7, 1932 to April 8, 1936, Chang was the Executive Vice-minister of the Ministry of Transportation and Communications in China.

In 1935, Chang founded the National Theater School (國立戲劇學校).

From January 1940 to 1941, Chang was Provost of National Chengchi University.

=== Taiwan years ===
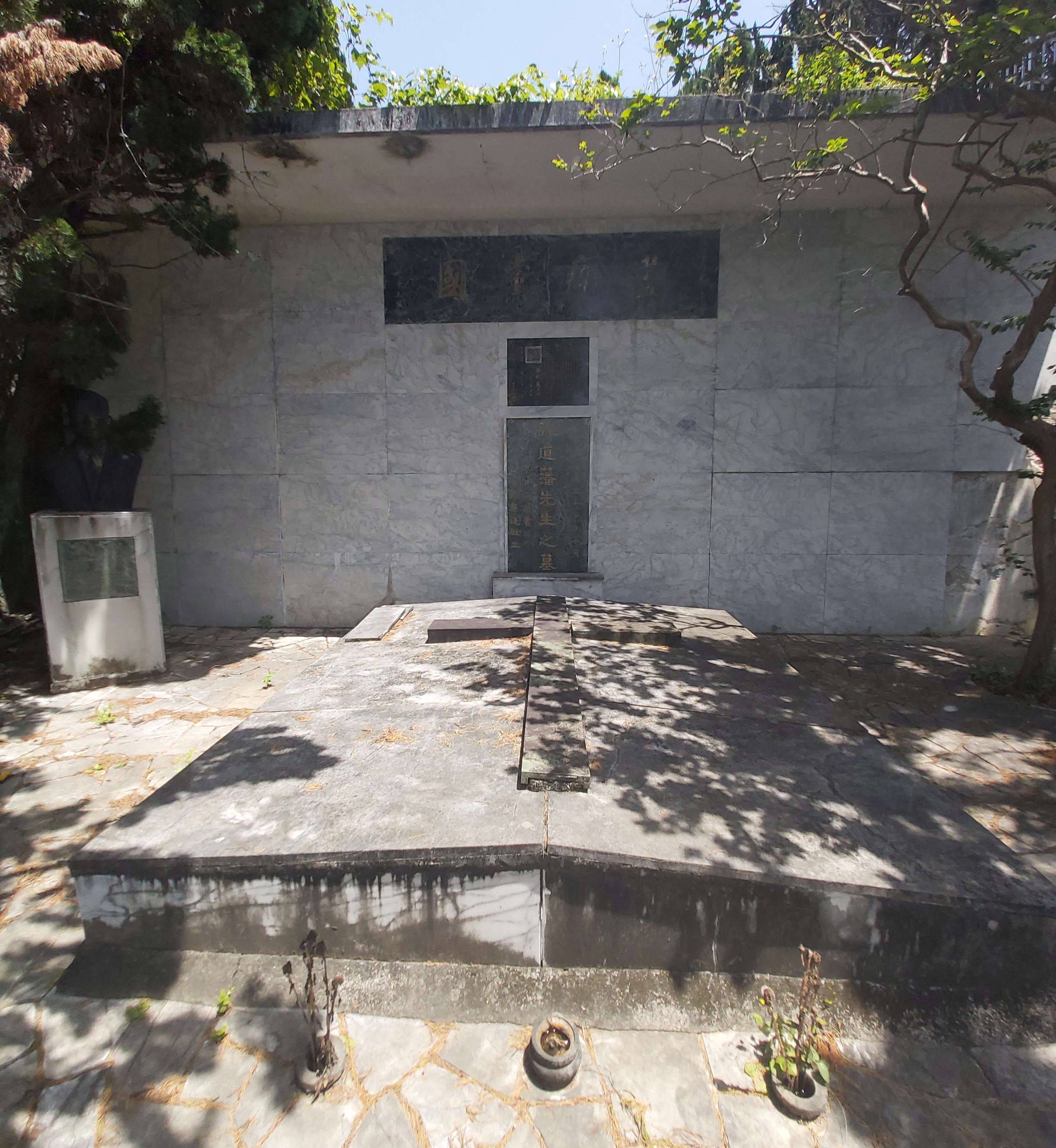
Tomb of Chang Tao-fan

In 1949, Chang moved to Taiwan with Chiang Kai-shek.

From January 1950 to 1968, Chang was the President of China Daily News in Taiwan.

From March 17, 1952 to February 24, 1961, Chang was the fourth President of the Legislative Yuan.

Chang died in Taipei at age 70.

== See also ==
- List of presidents of the Legislative Yuan

Government offices
Preceded by Huang Kuo-shu	President of the Legislative Yuan; 1952–1961	Succeeded by Huang Kuo-shu
