= Situ Qiao =

Chinese oil painter and graphic artist

Situ Qiao 司徒乔
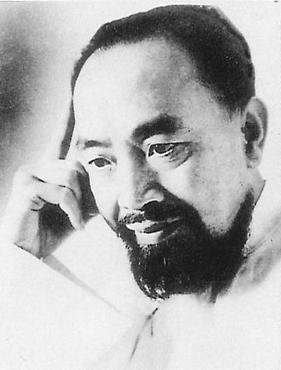
- Born: Situ Qiaoxing; 1902; Kaiping, Guangdong, China
- Died: 16 February 1958 (aged 55–56); Beijing
- Known for: Oil painting, graphic art
- Notable work: Put Down Your Whip
- Movement: Lingnan School
- Spouse: Feng Yimei (冯伊湄)

Situ Qiao depicted the suffering, the pain, the agony and the social realities faced in old China for the first half of the 20th century. His work Put Down Your Whip was a physical footprint which left a memorable impression in Asian art.[] Situ Qiao (Chinese: 司徒乔; 1902 – 16 February 1958) was a Chinese oil painter and graphic artist. An important member of the Lingnan School of art, he was also known for his friendship with the influential writer Lu Xun. His most famous work is the 1940 painting Put Down Your Whip.

== Biography ==
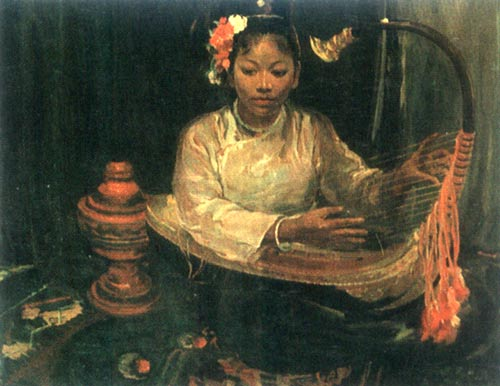
1939 oil painting Guqin

Situ Qiao was born to a poor family in Chikan, Kaiping, Guangdong province in 1902. His name at birth was Situ Qiaoxing (司徒乔兴). His father was an amateur painter.

In 1924, Situ entered the School of Theology of Yenching University in Beijing, but was more interested in painting. In 1926, he held his first personal exhibition, which was noticed by Lu Xun, who purchased his drawing Five Policemen and an O. When the Northern Expedition war erupted in 1927, he moved to Wuhan to work for the Soviet advisor Mikhail Borodin.

By 1928, he had moved to Shanghai and set up a studio. He held an exhibition in March 1928, which was again noticed by Lu Xun, who wrote about his conversation with Situ Qiao. In winter 1928, Situ left for France to study painting, and exhibited at the Paris Salon the following year.

In 1930, Situ Qiao left France to study in New York City. He supported his studies by selling his own paintings. However, his activity was considered working, which was illegal for a holder of a student visa, and he was arrested. While being held in a prison for immigrants, he painted a painting entitled Painting the Statue of Liberty from the Most Unfree Place.

After being deported back to China, in 1931 he taught at Lingnan University in Guangzhou. In 1934, he went to Beijing, working as an art editor for Ta Kung Pao, and moved to Shanghai in 1936. Situ Qiao was present when Lu Xun died on 19 October 1936 in Shanghai, and drew the famous final sketches of the writer.

He soon moved to Nanjing, then capital of China. When the invading Japanese army attacked Nanjing in 1937, all his personal collection of paintings were destroyed.

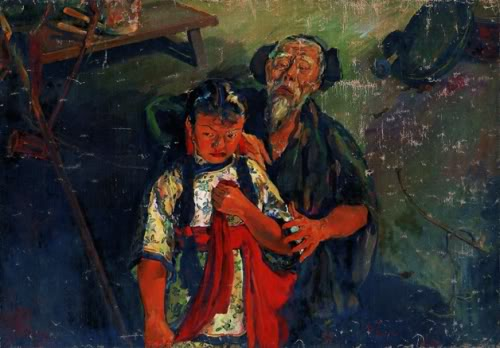
1940 oil painting Put Down Your Whip

Fleeing from the Sino-Japanese War, Situ Qiao left China for Rangoon, Burma, and later to Singapore. In 1940, he saw actor Jin Shan and actress Wang Ying's performance of Chen Liting's patriotic play Put Down Your Whip. He invited Jin Shan and Wang Ying to his studio, and painted his eponymous oil painting, which has become his most famous work.

When Singapore also fell to the Japanese in 1941, Situ Qiao escaped to the wartime Chinese capital Chongqing. After WWII, Situ Qiao went to New York City with his wife, Feng Yimei in September 1946 to seek treatment for his lung disease. They returned to Beijing in 1950 after the founding of the People's Republic of China. He taught at the China Central Academy of Fine Arts and helped to set up the National Museum of China.

On 16 February 1958, Situ Qiao died in his studio in Beijing. He donated all his paintings to the state, which are now in the collections of various museums in Beijing, Shanghai, Guangzhou, and his hometown, Kaiping. A compilation of his paintings was published by Beijing People's Art Publishing House.
