= Jiang Biwei =

Chinese writer

Jiang Biwei 蔣碧薇
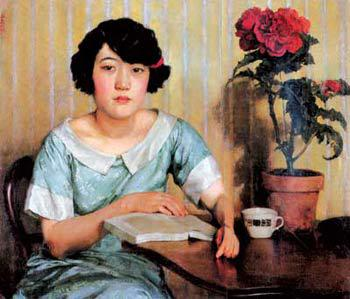
- 1925 painting by Xu Beihong
- Born: 9 April 1899; Yixing, Jiangsu, China
- Died: 12 December 1978 (aged 79); Taipei, Taiwan
- Other names: Jiang Tangzhen
- Partner(s): Xu Beihong; Chang Tao-fan
- Children: Xu Boyang, Xu Lili

Jiang Biwei (Chinese: 蔣碧薇; pinyin: Jiǎng Bìwēi; 9 April 1899 – 12 December 1978) was influential in the lives of the painter Xu Beihong and the politician Chang Tao-fan. She published her memoirs and she is portrayed in Chinese historical dramas.

== Life ==
=== Early life ===
Jiang was born as Jiang Tangzhen (Chinese: 蔣棠珍) in Yixing, Jiangsu province on 9 April 1899. Her father Jiang Meisheng was a scholar and poet who wrote a book on the Zhuangzi, and her mother Dai Qingbo was a poet. She attended the Young Girls Normal School in Changzhou. In 1911, her parents betrothed her to Zha Zihan, who came from an influential family of Haining, Zhejiang.

=== Relationship with Xu Beihong ===
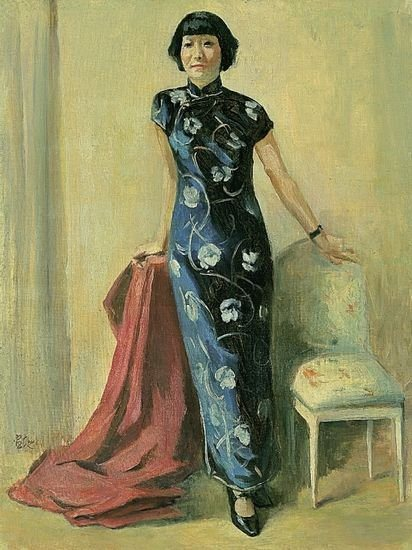
Jiang Biwei in Cheongsam dress by Xu Beihong

In 1916 her family moved to avoid conflict in Yixing and so that her father could be a professor at Fudan University in Shanghai. One of the student friends of her father was the ambitious and talented artist Xu Beihong. He would come to visit her family and he and Jiang became close. Xu was set to go to Japan to study and Jiang was upset that she would shortly be married to the Zha family. Breaking the marriage agreement was virtually impossible, so they left a note behind and eloped to Japan. Xu gave her the name Jiang Biwei as a disguise, which later became better known than her real name. The embarrassment for her family was so great that her parents declared that she had died from an illness. Their anger subsided after Jiang wrote a letter of apology from Japan. After six months the couple, whose funds had run out, moved back to Shanghai. Xu was then offered a bursary to study in France by Cai Yuanpei of Peking University.

In 1918 they both left and while Xu studied art in France she learned French so that she could run the household. Xu's bursary was not always regular and although he enrolled at top art schools they had to briefly move to Berlin where their francs would stretch further. At another point Jiang had to embroider at five francs a piece to make ends meet.

In 1925 Xu returned to China alone to gather more funds leaving Jiang in Paris. However, Jiang was pregnant and she returned to China where she had a son, Xu Boyang, in 1927 and a daughter, Xu Lili, two years later.

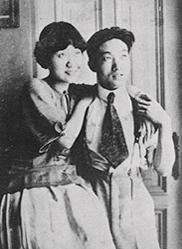
Xu Beihong and Jiang Biwei

Xu rose to be a Professor of Art at Nanjing University. In 1930 Xu revealed that he had fallen in love with Sun Duoci, one of his part-time students. Jiang agreed to ignore this unfortunate turn of events. In 1933 Professor Xu was asked to go on a European tour with his exhibition and Jiang asked to go with him. This was an opportunity for them to be free of Sun Duoci who was left at the university where she was now enrolled as a full-time student. Xu was still in love with her and he saw her as a genius of painting and he had frequently used her as a model for his own work. Xu was also still using Jiang as a model and the only work of Xu that was sold in Europe was a painting of the sitting figure of Jiang.

After they returned from their tour of Europe via Russia, her husband and Sun Duoci would go on sketching trips with other students. The gossip was too much for Jiang to bear and in her anger she destroyed artworks at Xu's studio which featured Sun. At the time Xu was unwilling to divorce Jiang and Sun left the university - without a degree. In 1938, Xu made a public announcement in a newspaper that he would sever his relationship with Jiang, but Sun still rejected him and married someone else. The reality of Xu's affair with Sun has been questioned in later accounts. In her biography of Xu, Liao Jingwen states that there was never any improper relationship between him and Sun Duoci. Instead, the rumours about Xu's affair were spread by Zhang Daofan, who was attempting to separate Jiang from her husband.

=== Relationship with Chang Tao-fan ===
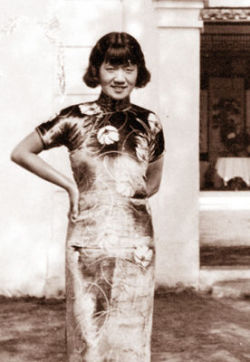
Jiang Biwei

Jiang and Xu agreed to separate in 1935. The following year Jiang renewed her friendship with Chang Tao-fan (Zhang Daofan) who she had known in Paris in the 1920s. Chang had married but he had always admired Jiang and now the two of them exchanged love letters. It was said that the Japanese were to bomb the city so Chang Tao-fan arranged for her to leave the city and join him in Chongqing. Here they were able to correspond more freely but Jiang could never meet formally except at official functions. Chang still had a French wife and a child. Chang was vice-minister of education and Jiang was able to re-use the skills she learnt in Paris by teaching French at the local university.

In 1938 Xu published in the local newspaper that Jiang and his relationship had now ended, the relationship did not end formally. In 1943 Jiang staged an exhibition in Chongqing of her art collection, which included nearly three dozen of Xu's paintings. This exhibition damaged her husband's reputation with his peers. In 1944 Xu again published in the newspaper that his relationship with Jiang had ended. He followed it three days later with an engagement announcement. Jiang's parents had both died and that year her son decided to leave and join the army. Jiang blamed this on his broken home. Jiang saw that this was time to formally end her marriage and she requested a substantial settlement. Xu agreed to her terms but devaluation of the currency meant that the terms were not as attractive as Jiang had expected.

Chang's French wife was a difficulty in Chinese society and Chang sent her abroad for some years. Chinese students who had brought back foreign wives were considered foolish. Jiang Biwei moved to Taiwan when the Kuomintang government lost the Chinese Civil War and retreated to the island. Chang Tao-fan later became President of the Legislative Yuan (equivalent to Premier) of the Republic of China on Taiwan. They lived together for ten years, but never appeared together in public. In 1958, Chang's wife returned to Taiwan, and Jiang left his life. When Chang Tao-fan published his memoirs, he did not mention Jiang Biwei at all. He died in 1968.

Jiang published the memoir Reminiscences of Jiang Biwei in 1964. Composed of two volumes, Beihong and I and Daofan and I, the book revealed details of her relationships with both Xu Beihong and Chang Tao-fan, and was thought to be detrimental to Chang's reputation. On 16 December 1978, Jiang died of a cerebral hemorrhage in Taipei.

== Legacy ==
Xu Beihong painted several portraits of Jiang Biwei, including a 1933 painting which is now in Kyoto. Their son, Xu Boyang, signed an affidavit that another portrait that had been found was of his mother. The painting of the nude Jiang was then sold for approximately $11m in 2010 at Beijing Jiuge Auctions. After the sale it was claimed that the painting was not by Xu Beihong, but rather was a piece created in 1983 by a student at the Central Academy of Fine Arts.
