= Gérard Coste =

French painter and diplomat

- Born: 24 March 1939 (age 87); Marseille, France
- Known for: Painting
- Relatives: Otakar Kubín (Nephew-in-law)
- Awards: Ordre national du Mérite – Knight Legion of Honour – Knight

Gérard Coste (born 24 March 1939), is a French painter and diplomat.

== Biography ==
Gérard was born in Marseille, France on 24 March 1939. His parents owned a pharmacy in Apt, which was destroyed during the bombing in 1942.

From 1943 to 1944 he attended Apt School of Sisters, before they moved to Provence, where his parent bought another pharmacy. He started studying at Saint Denis School there until 1949. Then he attended St. Joseph College in Avignon from 1949 until 1956.

He was a graduate of the Sciences Po (Paris)(1963 – 1964), HEC Paris(1959 – 1962) and the École nationale d'administration (National School of Administration) (1958 – 1959). After finishing universities he began his diplomatic career in Laos in 1964, later serving in Japan.

Being in Japan, he spent two years studying painting with the master Toshimitsu Imai, being Imai's only Western student. Coste had his first one-man exhibition in 1975 in Japan. He has had several shows in France and Japan and exhibiting his works regularly in Japan, the United States, Singapore and Thailand. He is the nephew-in-law of the late Czech painter Otakar Kubín whom lived nearby, close to Marseille.

From 1978 until 1983 he was a cultural advisor to Japan, and made several exhibitions in Tokyo and in the provinces. Later he became a Director of French cultural centers and institutes abroad at the Ministry of the EI(1983 – 1985). From 1993 until 1995 he served as an ambassador to Singapore, where he also made several exhibitions. Later he became an ambassador to Bangkok(1996- 1999), where he made a publication "Darkness and light".

He pursued both careers, diplomatic and artistic together. He says : "I always had an urge to flee my own culture and a prearranged destiny". He retired in 2003, the date on which he set up his painting studio in Bangkok.

== Personal life ==
Coste married Naomi (a Japanese-American model he met in Japan) in 1974.

== Main Assignments ==
- Communication Director of the Ministry of Foreign Affairs 1985-1987
- General Consul in Los Angeles 1988-1993
- Ambassador of France in Singapore 1993-1995
- Ambassador of France to Thailand 1995-1999
- General Consul in San Francisco 2000-2003

=== Honors ===
- Knight of the France's Legion of Honour
- Knight of the France's Ordre national du Mérite.
- Knight Grand Cordon (Special Class) of the Most Noble Order of the Crown of Thailand
- Knight Grand Cordon (Special Class) of the Order of The White Elephant of Thailand

=== Publications ===
- "Golden Skies" 1992. Limited Edition
- "Windows" 1995.Limited Edition
- "Elsewhere" 2005. Limited Edition
- "En Dedans" 2010.
- "Lami", a novel, 2010.
- "Ressac", 2011.
- "Abyme", 2012.

"Ailleurs",2012. "Crypte", 2013. "Avatar",2014.
