= The Life of Wu Xun =

- Film poster
- Directed by: Sun Yu
- Written by: Sun Yu
- Produced by: Ren Zongde; Xia Yunhu
- Starring: Zhao Dan; Huang Zongying; Zhou Boxun
- Cinematography: Han Zhongliang
- Edited by: Fu Zhengyi
- Music by: Huang Yijun; Lu Hongen
- Production company: Kunlun Film Studio
- Release date: 1950 (China)
- Running time: 204 minutes
- Country: China
- Language: Mandarin

The Life of Wu Xun (simplified Chinese: 武训传; traditional Chinese: 武訓傳; pinyin: Wǔ Xùn Zhuàn) is a 1950 Chinese film directed by Sun Yu and starring Zhao Dan. A black and white movie, it was produced by Kunlun Film Studio. It deals with a true story of a figure in Chinese history, Wu Xun, who spent years collecting money as a beggar to eventually found a free school for indigent children.

After initial release and despite praise from other Chinese Communist Party (CCP) leaders, Mao Zedong published an editorial criticizing the film as "fanatically publicising feudal culture" and for its "tolerance for slandering the peasant revolutionary", and described the lead character as a "reactionary feudalist ruler". Mao also denounced praise of the film. The film became known as "the first banned film of New China". It was shown in a private showing in 2005 and was released on DVD in 2012.

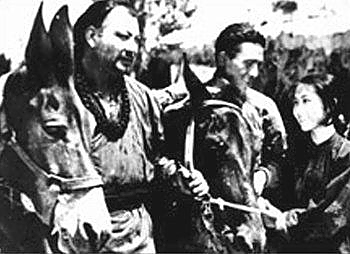
A scene from the film

It was initially well received as one of the ten best films of the year, but was soon severely criticized by Chinese authorities. It was rehabilitated in 1986.

== Criticism ==
The Life of Wu Xun attained its unique status in Chinese movie history because of the lengthy political criticism campaign that was enacted against it. On May 20, 1951, after the editorial Ought to Emphasize the Discussion on 'The Life of Wu Xun' was published in the People's Daily, there emerged the very first large-scale excoriation of a film in the history of the People's Republic of China. It was one of the early political campaigns dealing with art in the PRC.

Shortly after its release, the film was personally denounced by Mao Zedong. In the People's Daily, Mao attacked Wu Xun as a liberal whose literacy programs implied that revolution was not necessary. A group of politicians, led by Kang Sheng and Mao's wife Jiang Qing, leveled charges against the film in order to discredit what they called "liberal" tendencies. As a result, the production staff of the film, and even the historical figure of Wu Xun, suffered from extensive accusations. This campaign of criticism began a period when CCP politics severely interfered with the Chinese film industry. The reputation of the film was not completely restored until nearly forty years later, in 1986.
