= Put Down Your Whip (painting) =

1939 painting by Xu Beihong

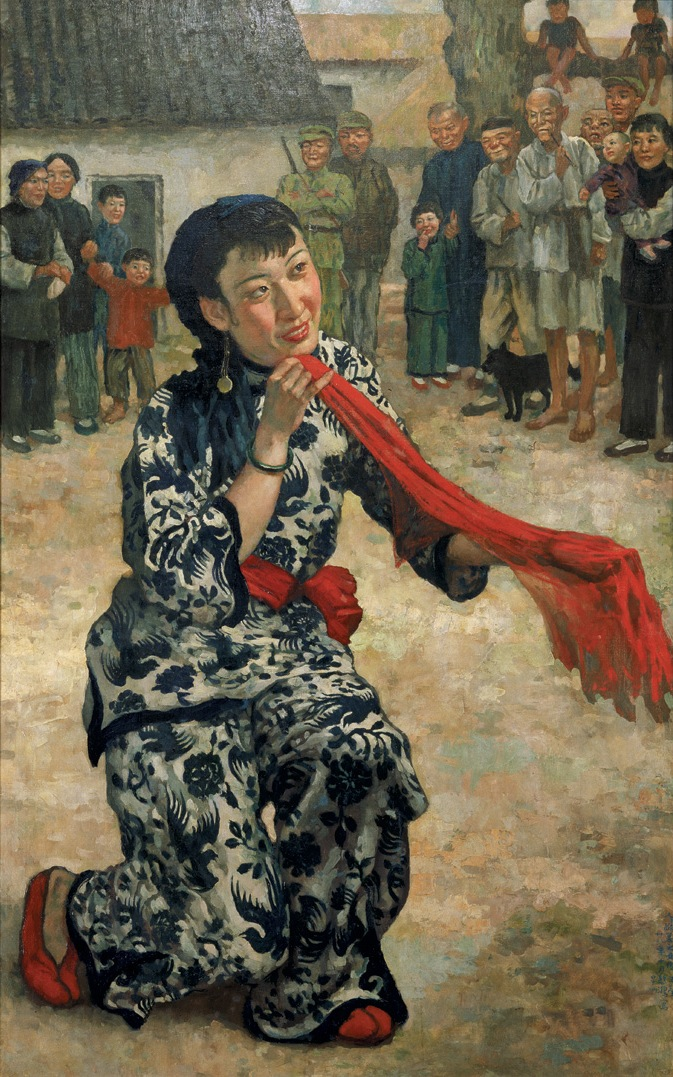
- Artist: Xu Beihong
- Year: 1939
- Type: Oil painting
- Dimensions: 144 cm × 90 cm (57 in × 35 in)

Put Down Your Whip (Chinese: 放下你的鞭子; pinyin: Fàngxià nǐde biānzi) is a 1939 oil painting by Chinese realist painter Xu Beihong. Completed during Xu's stay in Singapore, the painting was exhibited numerous times before its disappearance from public view in 1954. It re-emerged in 2007 and was sold for HK$72 million (US$9.2 million) in an auction on 7 April 2007 in Hong Kong, a then record for the highest price paid for a Chinese painting at auction. It is currently displayed in the National Gallery Singapore.

== History ==
=== Creation ===
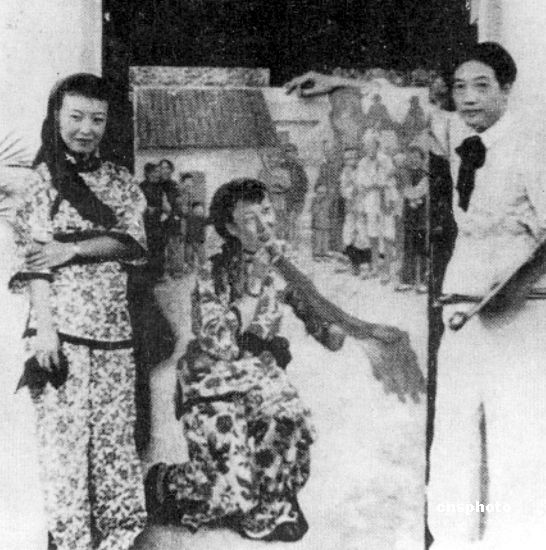
Xu Beihong and Wang Ying with the painting

In October 1939, during his stay in Singapore, Xu Beihong was inspired by a street drama performance titled Put Down Your Whip by actress Wang Ying, a friend of the artist. Written by Chen Liting based on a play by Tian Han, the drama depicts a girl and her father who escaped from the Japanese-occupied Northeast China and performed in the streets for a living. They sang about the hardship under the Japanese occupation and inspired their listeners to support the anti-Japanese war. Deeply moved by the drama, Xu spent ten days painting a life-size portrait of Wang with her audience in the background. He then titled the painting Put Down Your Whip after the drama.

=== After Xu's death ===
The painting was exhibited on numerous occasions during Xu's life. However, it disappeared from public view in 1954, a year after Xu's death. According to Sotheby's Asia chairman Patti Wong, Xu gave the painting to a close friend named Huang Menggui. After Huang died, his descendants approached the National Museum of Singapore in the hope that the museum could take the painting into its collection, but it did not happen for unspecified reasons. Huang's descendants then approached Singaporean collector Tan Tsze Chor, but Tan died abruptly, before the deal was made. The painting eventually landed in the hands of an anonymous Asian collector, until being put up for auction in 2007.

=== Auction ===
Put Down Your Whip was sold on 7 April 2007 in an auction in Hong Kong by Sotheby's for HK$72 million (US$9.2 million), setting a record for the highest price ever paid for a Chinese painting at an auction. The painting was bought by an anonymous collector over the telephone after competition from at least four other bidders.

In response to the auction, some art historians have criticized the explosion in the prices for Asian art, in particular over exuberant buyers for sending prices sky-high. Sotheby's Asia chairman Patti Wong, however, responded stating Xu's Put Down Your Whip would have sold well in any market.
