= Wu Xun =

Chinese educational reformer

Wu Xun (Chinese: 武训; pinyin: Wǔ Xùn; 1838–1896) was a Chinese educational reformer who pioneered free popular education in the country and became a hero of Chinese liberalism.

== Biography ==
Wu was born Wu Qi (武七) as the seventh child among his siblings, at Wuzhuang, Tangyi county (堂邑县, a part of Guan county nowadays). His father died when he was a child, leaving him to fend for himself. Too poor to attend the local academy, Wu determined to promote universal free education, supposedly because he was swindled for his illiteracy. A wandering beggar, Wu educated himself and used his little money to develop business ventures. Eventually he achieved success as a businessman, but he continued to beg, using the money he got to fund the foundation of local academies in Shandong. In the last decade of his life, Wu was a successful money lender and landlord, and he used his earnings to found three charity traditional academies. He got the bestowed name Xun from the court later.

Wu never married, and he fostered the second grandson of his eldest brother.

== Reputation ==
Wu's life and work was promoted as exemplary by many leading figures in the imperial court of the Qing dynasty. After his death in 1896 a memorial temple, the Wu Xun Temple in Guan County, Shandong, was created to honor his work. He was portrayed as a Confucian hero and his body was preserved. He continued to be regarded as a hero in Shandong, and the phrase "the spirit of Wu Xun" was used to refer to the social ideal of progress through education and traditional Confucian ideals of service.

== Reaction ==
In 1950 a film about his work, The Life of Wu Xun, was made. It was quickly criticised by radicals within the Chinese Communist Party for promoting Wu, whose life was attacked as counter-revolutionary. The campaign was the "first major politico-ideological campaign in the Chinese Communist regime". It was initiated by Mao's wife Jiang Qing, who loathed the "bourgeois reformism" epitomised by Wu. She persuaded Mao himself to write an article denouncing Wu as a promoter of "feudal" culture.

The backlash against the film led to an attempt to destroy the cult of Wu, continuing into the 1960s prior to the Cultural Revolution. Red Guards exhumed his corpse and carried it to a public square where it was subsequently given a trial and ordered burned. The Red Guards broke the body into pieces before setting light to it with gas. After Mao's death, Wu's reputation was restored. In 1985 the People's Daily stated that the criticisms of Wu "cannot be said to be even basically correct".
