= Feng Yidai =

Chinese author, editor, and translator

- 冯亦代
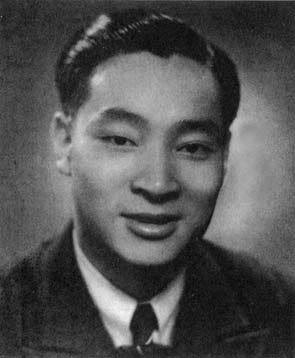
- Feng in the 1940s
- Born: 1913; Hangzhou, China
- Died: 23 February 2005 (aged 91–92); Beijing, China
- Occupations: Writer, editor, translator
- Spouses: Zheng Anna (m. 1939; died 1991) Huang Zongying (m. 1993)
- Children: Feng Tao

Chinese name
- Traditional Chinese: 馮亦代
- Simplified Chinese: 冯亦代
Transcriptions
Standard Mandarin
- Hanyu Pinyin: Féng Yìdài
- Wade–Giles: Feng I-tai

Feng Yidai (Chinese: 冯亦代; Wade–Giles: Feng I-tai; 1913 – 23 February 2005) was a Chinese author, editor, and translator. Born in Hangzhou, he studied in Shanghai and thereafter began an illustrious career in publishing and editing. He was denounced as a "rightist" during Mao Zedong's Anti-Rightist Campaign. He was politically rehabilitated after the Cultural Revolution and resumed his literary career. He married the actress and writer Huang Zongying in 1993. A few years before his death, he published his diaries and confessed his secret role as a government spy during the Anti-Rightist Campaign.

== Early life and education ==
He was born as Feng Yide (冯贻德) in 1913 in Hangzhou, Zhejiang, Republic of China. After graduating from the University of Shanghai with a degree in business management, Feng went on to join the publishing industry.

== Career ==
Feng relocated to Hong Kong in 1938, during which he helped found Chinese Writers, an English publication, while also serving as the general editor of Films and Writers. Together with director Mao Dun, Feng set up the China Amateur Drama Society in 1943. In the aftermath of the Second Sino-Japanese War, Feng began translating English-language novels and articles for American Literature Series, an anthology which he also helped publish that included works like The Fifth Column by Ernest Hemingway.

Feng Yidai was appointed the Secretary-General of the International Press in 1949, following the establishment of the People's Republic of China. Three years later, he became the editorial director of Chinese Literature, while also leading the Department of Foreign-Languages Publishing House. Feng's career came to a halt in 1957, when he was denounced as a rightist during the Anti-Rightist Movement. He was unable to write for the next two decades, and spent time under brutal conditions in a labour camp. His literary interests were not affected, however, as after being politically rehabilitated in the late 1970s, he founded the journal Reading. For another twenty years, Feng continued contributing stories and articles to Reading. In 1980, Feng toured the United States with fellow writer and translator Bian Zhilin. At the State University of New York, the duo met with American poets Alfred Poulin, Anthony Piccione, and William Heyen.

== Personal life and death ==
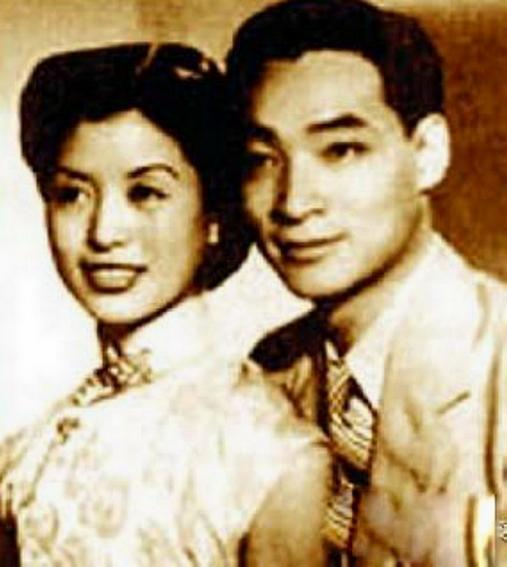
Feng Yidai and Zheng Anna

Feng married Zheng Anna (郑安娜), his classmate at University of Shanghai, in 1939. During the Cultural Revolution, because of Feng's status as a "rightist", Zheng was tortured by the Red Guards and became blind in one eye. They had a daughter named Feng Tao (冯陶). After Zheng died on 7 January 1991, Feng wrote the article An Undeliverable Letter in her memory.

Having spent his later life in Shanghai, Feng was a close friend of Shanghainese artist Ding Cong. Feng married fellow writer and actress Huang Zongying in 1993; she was 68, and it was her fourth marriage. According to Song Yuwu in the Biographical Dictionary of the People's Republic of China, "their love story has become legendary in the Chinese literary circle".

Having recovered from a stroke in 1996, Feng Yidai died on 23 February 2005 in Beijing, aged 92.

== Confession ==
In 2000, five years before his death, Feng published the diaries he had kept from July 1958 to April 1962, under the title Hui Yu Rilu (悔余日录; Journal in Remorse). The journal records his thoughts and experience after being denounced as a "rightist" during the Anti-Rightist Campaign. He was recruited by the Chinese Communist Party to spy on more prominent rightists, especially Zhang Bojun, the "No. 1 Rightist". In order to regain the grace of the Party, Feng worked diligently to ingratiate himself with Zhang and other rightists including Fei Xiaotong. He kept records of their conversations and reported the contents to his handlers. As his reward, the Party removed his "rightist" designation in 1960, but kept it secret in order not to raise suspicion.

After reading his confession, Zhang's daughter Zhang Yihe was appalled to find out that the kind family friend "Uncle Feng" was a government spy, but praised his courage for publicly confessing his sins. She recalled a conversation in which Feng said that he wanted her to be the publisher of his "final book", and felt that he had wanted to confess to her in person but could not find the courage to do so. Historian Zhu Zheng calls Feng's book "without equal" in the study of the Anti-Rightist Campaign. Although Feng received allowances from the government for his work, Zhu believes that he did not become a spy for financial reward, but had been brainwashed into believing it was the right thing to do.

== See also ==
- List of Chinese writers

== Bibliography ==
- Song, Yuwu (8 July 2013). Biographical Dictionary of the People's Republic of China. McFarland. ISBN 978-0-7864-3582-1.
