= Rhapsody of Happiness =

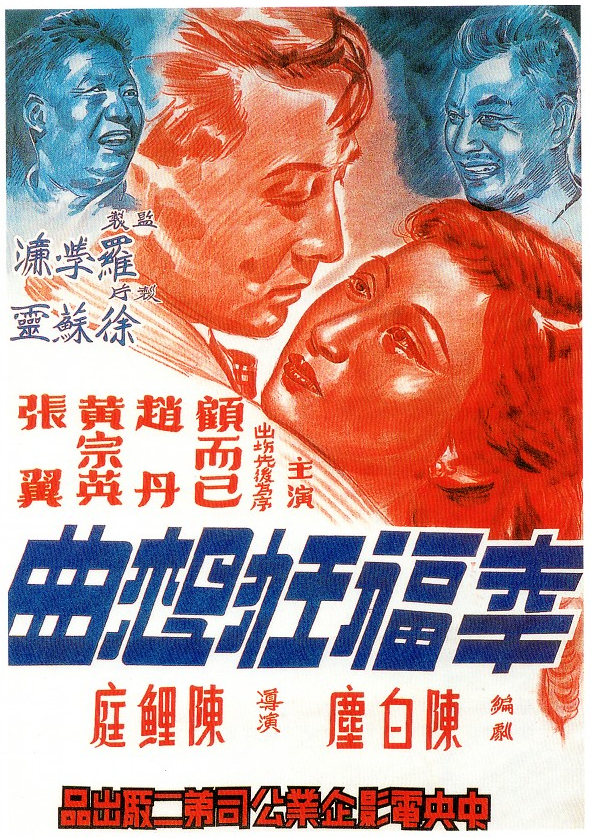
- Original poster
- Directed by: Chen Liting
- Written by: Chen Baichen
- Produced by: Luo Xuelian; Xu Suling
- Starring: Zhao Dan; Huang Zongying
- Production company: China Film No. 2 Studio
- Release date: November 1, 1947 (China)
- Country: China
- Language: Mandarin

Rhapsody of Happiness (Chinese: 幸福狂想曲; pinyin: Xìngfú Kuángxiǎngqǔ) is a Chinese film directed by Chen Liting and written by Chen Baichen. Made during the Republican era, it was produced by the state-owned China Film No. 2 Studio based in Shanghai. The film was released in late 1947, following the success of Chen Liting's first film Far Away Love.

== Film and plot ==
Huang Zongying played a woman forced into prostitution and drug dealing in war-torn China, capturing both the degeneracy and the kindness of the character's complex nature. The male lead was her future husband Zhao Dan, China's most celebrated male actor of the time.

== Cast ==
- Zhao Dan
- Huang Zongying
- Gu Eryi
- Zhang Yi

== See also ==
- List of Chinese films of the 1940s

== Bibliography ==
- Lee, Lily Xiao Hong (1998). Biographical Dictionary of Chinese Women: The Twentieth Century, 1912-2000. M.E. Sharpe. ISBN 978-0-7656-0798-0.
