= Château en Espagne =

1939 painting by Carel Willink

- Artist: Carel Willink
- Year: 1939
- Medium: Oil on canvas
- Dimensions: 97 cm × 121 cm (38 in × 48 in)
- Location: Museum Arnhem, Arnhem

Château en Espagne (English: Palace in Spain) is an oil on canvas painting made by the Dutchman Carel Willink, in 1939. It depicts dark clouds over a landscape with a ruined villa and a statue of Apollo. It was influenced by the works by Giorgio de Chirico and has been interpreted as a comment to the Spanish Civil War. It is in the collection of Museum Arnhem in Arnhem, the Netherlands. Ferdinand Bordewijk used the painting as the basis for a prose poem published in 1940.

== Subject and composition ==
Château en Espagne was painted in oil on canvas and has the dimensions 97 cm × 121 cm (38 in × 48 in). It depicts dark, threatening clouds over a French landscape. A large smoke pillar is prominent in the sky but its source is hidden behind the horizon. In the background to the left is a ruined villa illuminated by the sun. In the foreground is a balcony with a classical statue of the god Apollo.

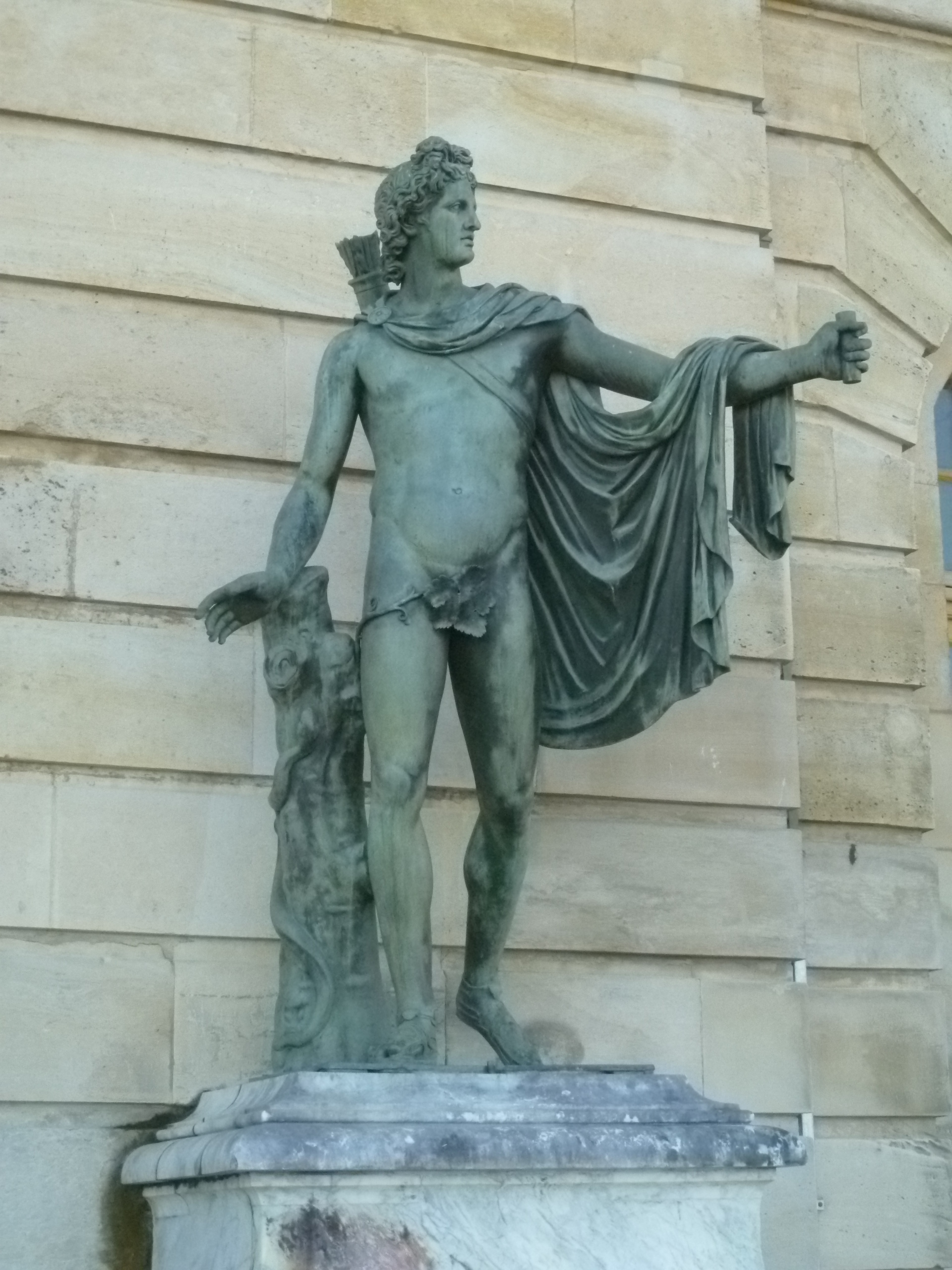
Apollo Belvedere in bronze at the Palace of Versailles

The statue is the Apollo Belvedere and was painted from a photograph Carel Willink had taken of a replica at the Palace of Versailles. The building was based on sketches Willink had made during his travels. The title Château en Espagne literally means "Castle in Spain" and is the French equivalent to the expression "castle in the air", that is, a fantasy or promise with no ground in reality.

== Analysis and reception ==
Like many of Willink's paintings, Château en Espagne was inspired by the metaphysical paintings of Giorgio de Chirico. The influence can be seen in its depiction of a mysteriously desolate building with classical architecture and distinct contrasts between light and darkness. André Glavimans wrote in Elsevier's Geïllustreerd Maandschrift in 1940 that the heavy smoke in the horizon is reminiscent of Joachim Patinir's paintings and that this almost had become a cliché in Willink's works.

Because of the title, the painting was understood at the time as a comment to the ongoing Spanish Civil War. Retrospectively it has been interpreted as anticipating World War II. Glavimans interpreted its fiery motif as an anticipation of "the new and better world". He described it as among Willink's more innovative paintings, which combines skilled painting, balance in the conception of the work, and an approach to classicism that creates a sense of simplicity, grandeur and familiarity. According to Glavimans, this managed to create "a completely pictorial solution for the most intense inner tensions". According to the description from Museum Arnhem, which owns the painting, the dark clouds connect the painting's elements and create a theme of contrast between life and death and wealth and decline.

The Dutch writer Ferdinand Bordewijk based a prose poem on Château en Espagne. It was published in the book De korenharp in 1940 as "Châteaux en Espagne. Naar A.C. Willink". The poem describes the painting, explicates a contrast between decay and harmony represented by the house and the statue, and mentions an approaching storm. In 2005, the literary scholar Mathijs Sanders connected these themes to the cultural pessimism of Oswald Spengler and Johan Huizinga, and to Menno ter Braak's defence of Willink as "an Apollonian painter, in whom the 'content' has been absorbed into the 'form', so that someone who unlawfully wants to separate the 'content' from the 'form' will only encounter emptiness and rhetoric".
