= Lobster Trap and Fish Tail =

- Artist: Alexander Calder
- Year: 1939
- Type: Painted steel wire and sheet aluminum
- Dimensions: 2.6 m × 2.9 m (8.5 ft × 9.5 ft)
- Location: The Museum of Modern Art, New York City, New York

Lobster Trap and Fish Tail, a mobile by American artist Alexander Calder, is located at the Museum of Modern Art in New York City, New York, United States. It is one of Calder's earliest hanging mobiles and "the first to reveal the basic characteristics of the genre that launched his enormous international reputation and popularity."

== History ==
The sculpture was commissioned by the Advisory Committee for the stairwell of the museum when the new building opened in 1939. Fabricated in Roxbury, Connecticut, the painted steel wire and sheet aluminum sculpture is 8' 6" (260 cm) x 9' 6" (290 cm) in diameter. The sculpture suggests the movement of underwater life.

Calder became a leading exponent of kinetic art, combining his engineering training with his studies of art in New York and Paris. According to a review in the New York Sun, "There, he became enthralled with the biomorphic surrealism of Joan Miró as well as the powerful choreography of modern dance pioneer Martha Graham." After experimenting with motorized sculptures, Calder began creating works that moved and floated when touched or exposed to air currents. Calder composed motion with works like Lobster Trap and Fish Tail, "harnessing the performative potential of the mechanical sciences."

== See also ==
- List of Alexander Calder public works
- Other works by Calder
  - Mercury Fountain
  - Flamingo
  - Mountains and Clouds
