= Wang Ying (actress) =

Chinese actress (1913–1974)

- 王莹
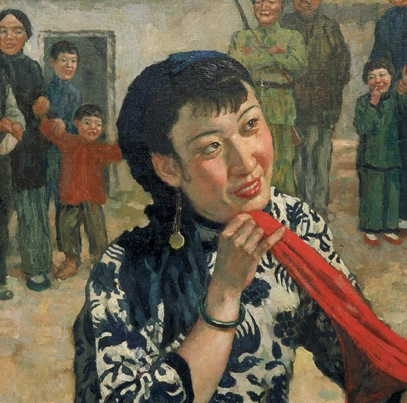
- Crop from Xu Beihong's painting Put Down Your Whip, depicting Wang Ying's performance of the street play.
- Born: March 8, 1913; Wuhu, Anhui, Republic of China
- Died: March 3, 1974 (aged 60); Beijing, China
- Other name: Yu Zhihua
- Education: Fudan University; Tokyo University
- Occupation: Actress
- Spouse: Xie Hengeng (m. 1951–1974)

Wang Ying (Chinese: 王莹; née , Yu Zhihua; during incarceration, Prisoner No. 6742; March 8, 1913 – March 3, 1974) was a Chinese actress in the 1930s. She rose to be a star of plays and cinema. The most valuable Chinese painting was of her. She was the first Chinese actor to appear for the US President. During the Cultural Revolution, she was imprisoned by former rival actress Jiang Qing, who had become a major political leader. Her reputation was not re-established until after her death.

== Life ==
Wang was born in 1913 in Wuhu when her name was Yu Zhihua. She went to live with her aunt whose family name was Wang. This was after her father sold her as a child bride to a man in Nanjing. She had to leave and she went to Shanghai after she was arrested for writing a critical letter to He Jian.

In 1929, she joined an art troupe in Shanghai led by Qian Xingcun and Xia Yan. The writer Xie Bingying renamed her Wang Ying and under that name she starred in three films - Women's Cry, Story of Red Tears and The Same Enemy. Her iconic appearance in the play Put Down Your Whip was seen throughout China and abroad and it inspired an eponymous painting by Xu Beihong. This was converted into a postcard and the painting in time became the most valuable painting by a Chinese artist. By 1939, the art troupe was now named the New China Troupe and was touring Asia. Wang was also writing a column for a Shanghai newspaper.

Wang joined the Chinese Communist Party in 1930. She was briefly detained for her political affiliation in 1935.

Evaluating Shanghai in the 1930s, Wang described the city as "like a monstrous hell ... and a vassal state of foreign countries" in which "[p]eople dream of nothing else except gobbling up others all the time."

== United States ==
Wang left for the United States in 1942 to improve her education. Whilst there, she met President Franklin Roosevelt and his wife and performed the play Put Down Your Whip in the White House. She continued to write and her thoughts were published in Chinese American newspapers. She had become a friend of Pearl S. Buck and she assisted Agnes Smedley in writing her book about Zhu De.

When Buck wanted to visit China, she found that was unwelcome because she was a friend of Wang Ying's.

She was persecuted by Jiang Qing at the time of the Cultural Revolution, and died at age 60. During incarceration, she was called Prisoner No. 6742.

== Legacy ==
Wang Ying was politically rehabilitated on July 6, 1979.

After her death, two books Two Kinds of Americans and her autobiography novel Bao Gu, were published. Besides her films, she also appeared in paintings.
