= Otakar Kubín =

Czech painter and sculptor (1883–1969)

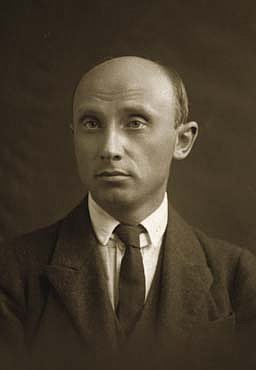
Otakar Kubín

Otakar Kubín (French: Othon Coubine; 22 October 1883 – 17 October 1969) was a Czech painter and sculptor.

== Biography ==
Kubín was born in Boskovice, Moravia, Austria-Hungary. His works are mainly associated with Impressionism. He was influenced by such artists as Vincent van Gogh and Paul Gauguin, and formed a friendship with Pablo Picasso. He was known in France as Othon Coubine. He died in Marseille, France, in 1969.
