= Liao Jingwen =

Liao Jingwen 廖静文
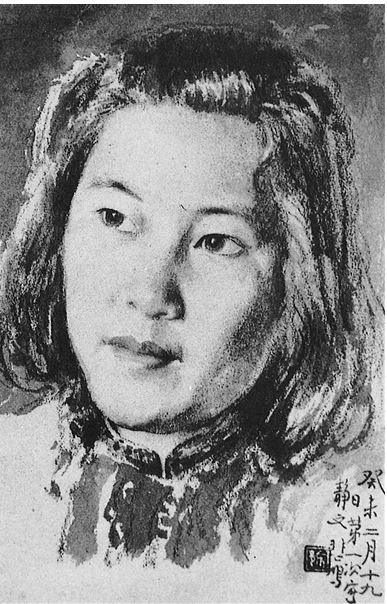
- Liao Jingwen painted by Xu Beihong
- Born: April 1923; Liuyang, Hunan, Republic of China
- Died: 16 June 2015 (aged 92); Beijing, People's Republic of China
- Education: Jinling Women's College, Chengdu
- Occupations: Museum curator and manager, writer, calligrapher
- Known for: Curation of Xu Beihong's art collection

Liao Jingwen
- Traditional Chinese: 廖靜文
- Simplified Chinese: 廖静文
Transcriptions
Standard Mandarin
- Hanyu Pinyin: Liào Jìngwén

Liao Jingwen (Chinese: 廖靜文; April 1923 – 16 June 2015) was assistant to and third wife of artist Xu Beihong. After his death in 1953, she served as head of the Xu Beihong Memorial Museum and the curator of his extensive art collection.

== Early life ==
Liao was born in 1923 to a family of intellectuals in Liuyang, though their ancestral home was Changsha, Hunan. After leaving high school, she traveled to Guilin, where she saw an advertisement for an administrator at the China Academy of Art at its wartime base in Chongqing. Liao took the position in 1943, whilst also enrolling in the arts and sciences institute of Jinling Women's College that had also set-up a campus in Chengdu. During this time, she worked for several famous artists, including Xu Beihong.

== Career ==
Liao met Xu Beihong in 1942, Liao worked as Xu's assistant and soon became Xu's mistress. The two married in 1946, after Xu divorced his wife Jiang Biwei, Liao born a son in the same year, and a daughter in later years. After Xu's death in 1953, Liao gifted over 1200 of Xu's artistic works to the Chinese state, as well as over 1000 pieces of historical art and thousands of books. Between 1953 and 1956, Liao studied Chinese culture at Peking University.

In 1956, Liao met a young military officer Huang Xinghua, who was 9 years younger than her. She pursued Huang, and the two married in the same year, they had a son.

In 1957, Liao became the head curator and researcher at the Xu Beihong Memorial Museum (Chinese: 徐悲鸿纪念馆). During the Cultural Revolution, Liao first thought she would have had a better social class as Xu's widow, so she divorced Huang. Later Xu's art was identified with capitalism and students repeatedly tried to destroy the collections at the Xu Beihong Memorial Museum. Liao herself was beaten severely several times defending the artworks. She eventually sent a letter via her son to Zhou Enlai, requesting protection for the collection and they were taken to the Forbidden City for safe-keeping. The memorial museum was shut down in 1967 to make way for a subway, however, Liao wrote to Mao Zedong in 1972 to request that another venue be found for it. Despite receiving words of encouragement from Zhou Enlai that the museum should be reopened, it took Liao over 10 years of negotiation with government officials and planning before a new memorial museum was opened in 1983 in Xinjiekou, Beijing. In 1982, she had also completed her memoir of Xu's life.

After the Cultural Revolution, as Xu has been restore as the important figure in modern Chinese art, Liao tried to hide her second marriage, refused to admit that she had married Huang, forbid the family members and friends mentioned Huang and her youngest son. She always shown herself as Xu's widow in public, and repeatedly emphasized her "Ture and the only Love" with Xu.

The book has been translated into English, published as Xu Beihong: Life of a Master Painter, as well as French and Japanese. Many of the contents of the book are accused of malicious and false descriptions of Xu Beihong's ex-wife and other famous painters of the same period.

== Later life ==
Liao worked as head of Xu Beihong Institute of Painting (Chinese: 中国徐悲鸿画院) and participated in the committee of the All-China Women's Federation, representing them at the seventh and eighth sessions of the Chinese People's Political Consultative Conference. She was also a trustee of the Xu Beihong International Foundation.

Her calligraphy was exhibited around China in 2015 as part of an exhibition for the 120th anniversary of Xu Beihong's birth.

== Written works ==
- Liao 廖, Jingwen 静文 (1987). Xu Beihong: Life of a Master Painter. Translated by Zhang Peiji. Beijing: Foreign Language Press. ISBN 0835115518.

== Personal life ==
Liao had two children with Xu Beihong: a son called Qingping (Chinese: 庆平), born in 1947; and a daughter called Fangfang (Chinese: 芳芳), born in 1948. She has one son with Huang Xinghua, called Liao Honghua.
