= Xia Yan (playwright) =

Chinese playwright and screenwriter

- 夏衍
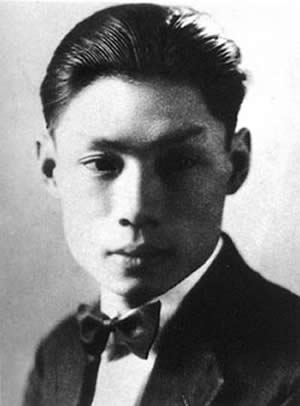
- Xia Yan
- Born: Shen Naixi; 30 October 1900; Yuhang County, Zhejiang
- Died: 6 February 1995 (aged 94); Beijing Hospital, Beijing, China
- Education: Zhejiang Industrial School
- Alma mater: Zhejiang University
- Occupations: Playwright, screenwriter, translator
- Spouse: Cai Shuxin (m.1930-?)
- Children: Shen Ning (daughter); Shen Danhua (son)
- Relatives: Shen Xueshi (father); Xu Xiusheng (mother)
- Writing career
- Language: Chinese
- Period: 1935-1995
- Genres: Drama, novel
- Notable works: Under the Eaves of Shanghai; The Fascist Bacillus

Xia Yan (Chinese: 夏衍; pinyin: Xià Yǎn; Wade–Giles: Hsia Yen; 30 October 1900 – 6 February 1995) was a left-leaning Chinese playwright and screenwriter, and the People's Republic of China's Deputy Minister of Culture between 1954 and 1965.

Among the dozens of plays and screenplays penned by Xia Yan, the most renowned include Under the Eaves of Shanghai (1937) and The Fascist Bacillus (1944). Today the Xia Yan Film Literature Award is named in his honor.

== Personal life ==
Xia entered Zhejiang Industrial School (浙江甲種工業學校 , a technical school of Zhejiang University) in 1915, five years before being sent to study in Japan. He was forced to return in 1927, two years after graduating with an engineering degree.

== Political career ==
On Xia's return in 1927 — expelled by Japanese authorities for his political activity — he joined the Chinese Communist Party (CCP) and rose to become a cultural chief in the Shanghai municipality, and then Deputy Minister of Culture in 1954.

In 1961, Xia wrote an essay called "Raise Our Country's Film Art to a New Level". The essay, implicitly critical of the Great Leap Forward, called for greater autonomy for artists and more diversity within Chinese cinema. The implementation of his directives is said to have led to the achievement of a "tremendous diversity" which lasted until the Cultural Revolution.

Xia is credited with introducing Soviet cinema to China, and helped to establish a realist tradition that emphasized active engagement with national issues, leaving a strong legacy that continued into the post-Mao era.

Xia's political career ended in 1965, when he was removed from office and spent eight years in prison during the Cultural Revolution.

== Other notable works ==
Xia's wrote a seven act play, Sai Jinhua, which became a major example of the national defense drama genre after its publication in 1936. It tells the story of Sai Jinhua, a late Qing era courtesan, who used her romance with German military official Alfred von Waldersee to assist China during the Boxer Rebellion. The play was a popular success. It also raised controversy because audiences understood the play as alluding to the Nationalist government's yielding to Japan.

Xia's 1936 play The Spirit of Freedom depicts the story of Qiu Jin. Xia wrote the play during a three month period when he secluded himself in a Shanghai apartment as a result of his contact Yuan Shu, a CCP intelligence agent who also worked with Soviet intelligence, being exposed in connection with the strange Westerner incident.

== References and further reading ==
- Shen, Vivian (2013). The Origins of Leftwing Cinema in China, 1932-37. Routledge. ISBN 9781135874100.
- Wang, Zheng (2017). Finding Women in the State: A Socialist Feminist Revolution in the People's Republic of China, 1949-1964. Oakland: University of California Press. ISBN 9780520292291..
- Xia, Yan (2014). "Under Shanghai Eaves (1937)". In Chen, Xiaomei (ed.). The Columbia Anthology of Modern Chinese Drama. Translated by George Hayden. New York: Columbia University Press. pp. 283–333. doi:10.7312/chen16502. ISBN 9780231535540. JSTOR 10.7312/chen16502.11.
