= Xu Beihong =

Chinese painter (1895–1953)

- 徐悲鴻
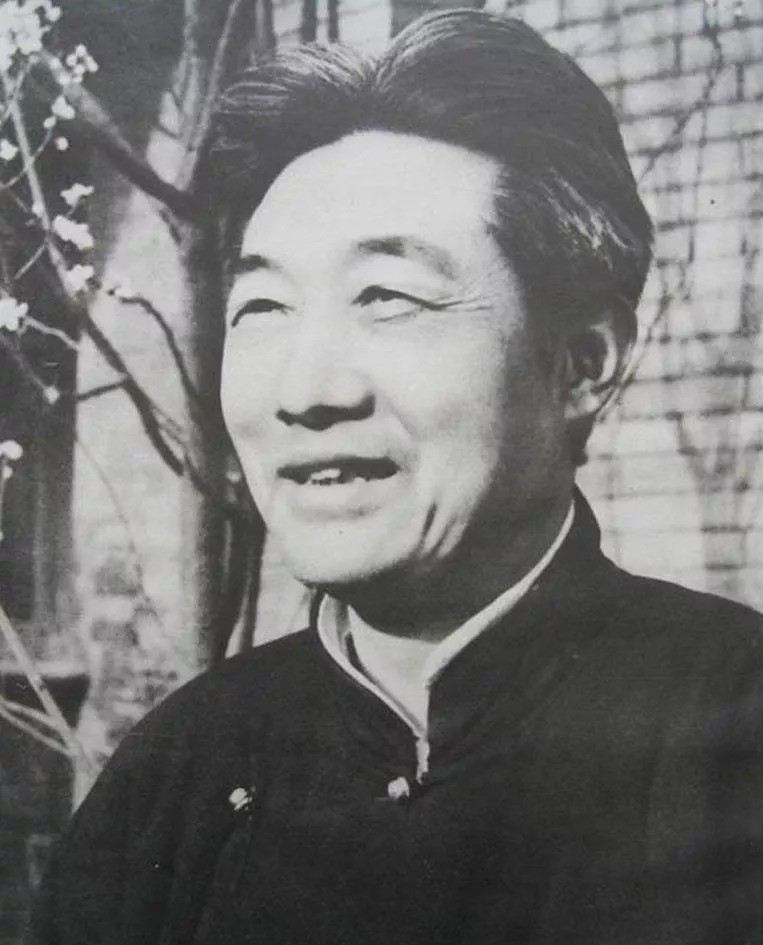
- Born: 19 July 1895; Yixing, Jiangsu, China
- Died: 26 September 1953 (aged 58); Beijing, China
- Other name: Ju Péon
- Known for: Oil painting, Chinese ink painting

Chinese name
- Traditional Chinese: 徐悲鴻
- Simplified Chinese: 徐悲鸿
Transcriptions
Standard Mandarin
- Hanyu Pinyin: Xú Bēihóng
- Wade–Giles: Hsü Pei-hung

Xu Beihong (Chinese: 徐悲鴻; Wade–Giles: Hsü Pei-hung; 19 July 1895 – 26 September 1953), also known as Ju Péon, was a Chinese painter.

He was primarily known for his Chinese ink paintings of horses and birds and was one of the first prominent Chinese artists of his time to articulate the need for artistic expressions, specifically in paving the origin for modern Chinese painting, that reflected a modern China at the beginning of the 20th century amongst choosing educated instructions that were ideally used from Western realism. He was also regarded as one of the first to create monumental oil paintings with epic Chinese themes – a show of his high proficiency in an essential Western art technique. He was one of the four pioneers of Chinese modern art who earned the title of "The Four Great Academy Presidents".

== Biography ==
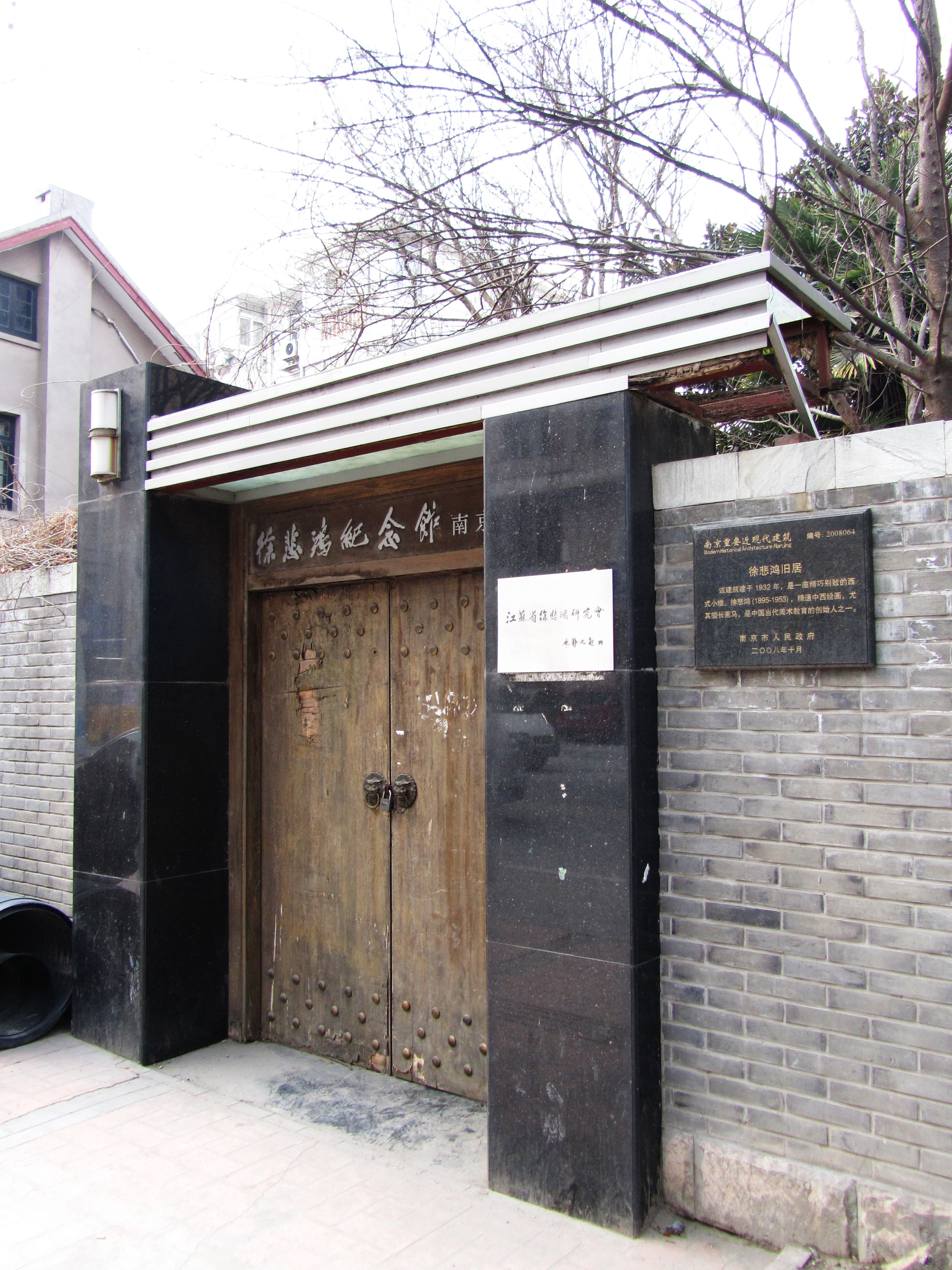
Former residence of Xu Beihong in Nanjing

Xu was born on 19 July 1895 in Yixing, Jiangsu, during the late Qing dynasty. He began studying classic Chinese works, beginning with calligraphy at the age of six, and Chinese painting at the age of nine. He was taught by his father Xu Dazhang, who was a private school teacher. Xu came from rural Yixing, Jiangsu province. He started from the scratch and in the end became a well-known figure in the world due to his contributions in the art industry.

In 1915, he moved to Shanghai, where he made a living off commercial and private work. He was then told by the Zhongshan Library to create a group of athletic wall works called Tan tui tushuo that was distributed by them. In 1916, Xu was admitted into Fudan University to learn French. He then traveled to Tokyo in 1917 to study arts. When he returned to China, he began to teach at Peking University's Arts school at the invitation of Cai Yuanpei. Xu won a scholarship at the prestigious National High School of Art in Paris in the year 1919. He studied and travelled in Europe in more than a decade and was mainly inspired by Classic traditions of European art and culture, which helped him in incorporating improved creativity and innovation elements in his artwork.

Beginning in 1919, Xu studied overseas in Paris at the École Nationale Supérieure des Beaux-Arts, where he studied oil painting and drawing. He was known as Ju Peon while studying in Paris. His painting has been showcased in various platforms and used by learner in understanding what transpired during the early period in relation to Chinese art industry.

His travels around Western Europe allowed him to observe and learn Western art techniques. Xu Beihong still wrote regularly for the Daily University of Peking University that dealt with wider issues then just campus politics. Xu addressed issues of Art and Art History and in 1920 a university art journal called Painting Miscellany was published. In 1926, during his time at Datong College, he noted in his response regarding the frustrations of how sketched drawings of the figure can be implemented into the traditional aspect of Chinese artworks by saying that his grouping of noises in everyday modern China included natural paintings such as depictions of plants and birds, next to environmental artworks and paintings of portrayed individuals as the final of the collection of Chinese art.

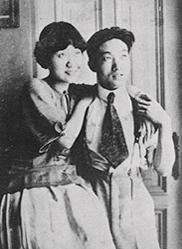
Xu Beihong and Jiang Biwei

He and his partner Jiang Biwei came back to China in 1927 and, from 1927 to 1929, he gained a number of posts at institutions in China, including teaching at National Central University (now Nanjing University) in the former capital city Nanjing and cofounding Nanguo Academy in Shanghai with Tian Han and Ouyang Yuqian.

In 1933, Xu organized an exhibition of modern Chinese painting that traveled to France, Germany, Belgium, Italy, and the Soviet Union. He studied and traveled in Europe in more than a decade and was mainly inspired by Classic traditions of European art and culture, which helped him in incorporating improved creativity and innovation elements in his artwork.

During World War II, Xu traveled to Southeast Asia, holding exhibitions in Singapore and India. All the proceeds from these exhibitions went to Chinese people who were suffering as a result of the war. The Nationalist Party chose Xu Beihong following his return to China in August 1946 to become Beiping Art Academy's president in the midst of its regional governance within Beijing. After the founding of the People's Republic of China in 1949, Xu became president of the Central Academy of Fine Arts and chairman of the China Artists Association. In April 1950, The Beiping Art Academy turned into the Central Academy of Fine Arts (CAFA) under the Communist Party's leadership with Xu Beihong situated as its first head president. Xu Beihong was a master of both oils and Chinese ink. Most of his works, however, were in the Chinese traditional style. Xu Beihong had a free technique of brush in his art works; he also believed that painting should be more real and should be more understood by people.

In his efforts to create a new form of national art, he combined Chinese brush and ink techniques with Western perspective and methods of composition. He integrated firm and bold brush strokes with the precise delineation of form. As an art teacher, he advocated the subordination of technique to artistic conception and emphasizes the importance of the artist's experiences in life. Of all of the Painters of the modern era, it can be safely said that Xu is the one painter most responsible for the direction taken in the modern Chinese Art world. In June 1949, Xu established himself as an advocating non-communist of the Chinese art circle among the congress awaiting the creation of the New China through his artwork, "At the World Peace Congress," in which he immediately made a following drawing of this planned art as inspiration to make his own finalized painting once he returned to Beijing as part of his political committed position of his given Chinese responsibility he has obliged to do. It is evident that Xu's art was aimed at creating a picture to the viewers to understand various events occurring in China. Nonetheless, Xu's work could also be used in understanding not only social but also political events specifically in the New China.

The policies enacted by Xu at the beginning of the Communist Era continue to control not only official Government Policy towards the arts, but they continue to direct the overall direction taken in the various Art Colleges and Universities throughout China.

Xu enjoyed massive support from art collectors across Asia. Between 1939 and 1941, he held solo exhibitions in Singapore, India and Malaya (Penang, Kuala Lumpur and Ipoh) to help raise funds for the war relief effort in China. In one war benefit exhibition in March 1939, Xu held a group exhibition with Chinese ink painting masters Ren Bonian and Qi Baishi, and showcased 171 works of art at the Victoria Memorial Hall.

He also met Rabindranath Tagore and Mahatma Gandhi during his stay in India, and received inspiration which led to the creation of iconic works such as the 4.21m-wide The Foolish Old Man Who Removed the Mountains painting on show at the Singapore Art Museum (SAM). Artworks including After a Poem of the Six Dynasties, Portrait of Ms Jenny and Put Down Your Whip were also created during his sojourns in Southeast Asia. SAM Director Kwok Kian Chow mentioned that Xu's name tops the list in Asian modern realism art, and his connections with various parts of Asia and Europe opened a new chapter of historical narratives, exchanges and influences of aesthetics and ideas in art.

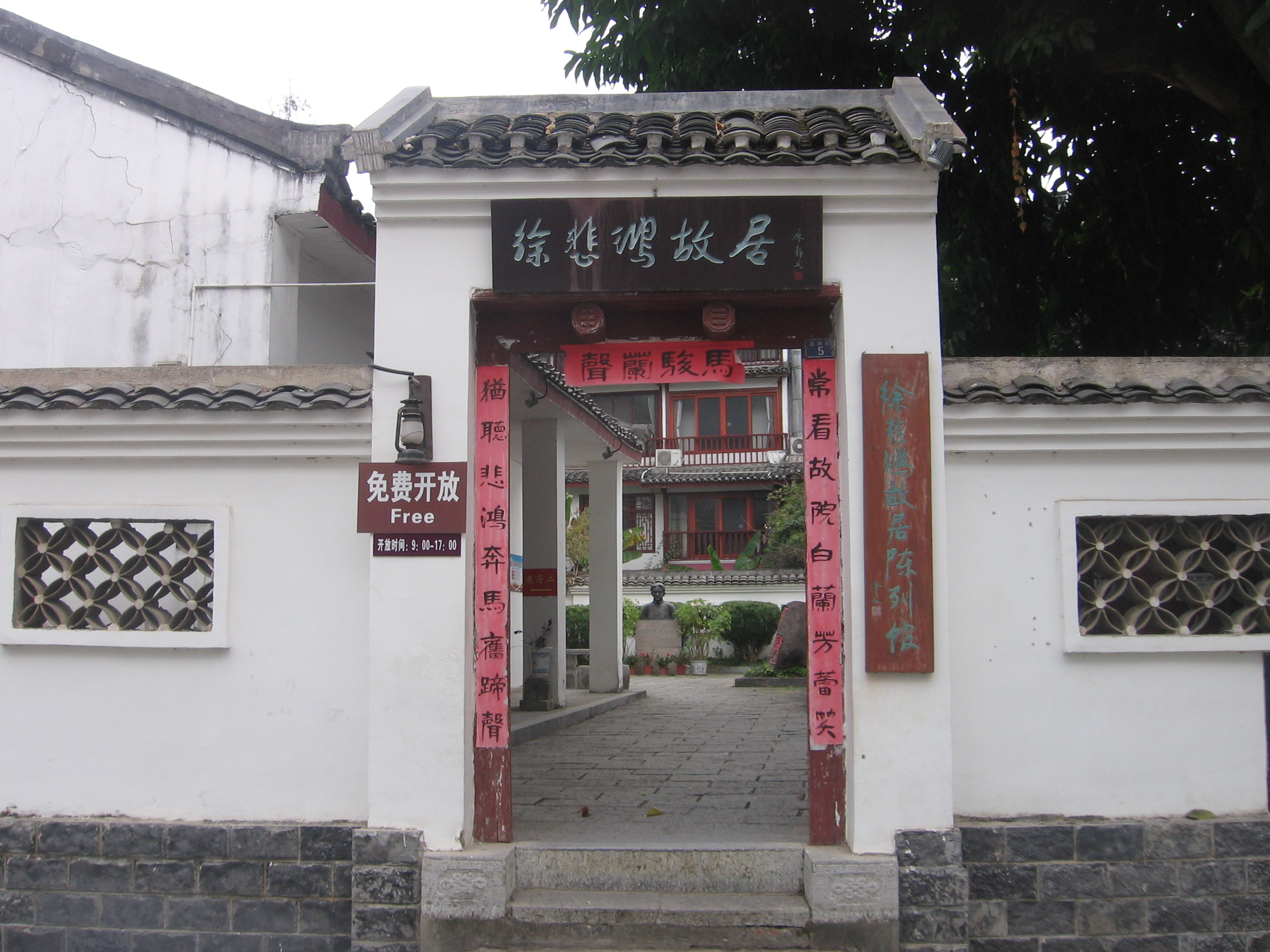
Former residence of Xu Beihong in Yangshuo

Xu developed new visual art techniques and international aesthetics, in a bid to reinvent Chinese art. In fact, Xu's influence extends beyond China in the early 20th century. Many notable Singaporean artists including Chen Wen Hsi, Lee Man Fong and Chen Chong Swee looked up to him as a mentor and a worthy peer, sharing Xu's desire to closely observe nature and inject realism into Chinese painting.

Xu died of a stroke in 1953. After his death, a Xu Beihong Memorial Museum was established at his home in Beijing by his wife Liao Jingwen.

=== Family feud ===
In 2008, two ceramic vases created by Xu Beihong scheduled for an art exhibition in Singapore spurred local media attention. Family disputes broke out over the vases sales and profits, which led to legal tussles between the Huang descendants and the Singapore Art Museum. The Singaporean art collectors, Huang Man Shi and Huang Meng Gui, were famously supportive of Xu Beihong. The 18-cm high vases were made in the 1940s, titled Malay Dancers and Orchid were to be shown in a Jack Bonn curated exhibition in collaboration with the Singapore Art Museum, "Xu Beihong in Nanyang", as an attribution to the late grandfather and granduncle for the periods when Xu was a guest at his grandfather's estate. These items were returned as certain family members' feud led to the eventual auction failure and cancellation. The Museum maintained they were unaware of the legal implications surrounding the artifacts. Members of the Huang family adheres to the artifacts returning to the "original owners", in 2009.

=== Controversy ===
Xu's son, Xu Boyang, signed an affidavit that a nude portrait that had been found was of his mother Jiang Biwei. The painting was then sold for approximately $11m in 2010 at Beijing Jiuge Auctions. After the sale it was claimed that the painting was not by Xu Beihong but it was a piece created in 1983 by a student at the Central Academy of Fine Arts.

== Gallery ==
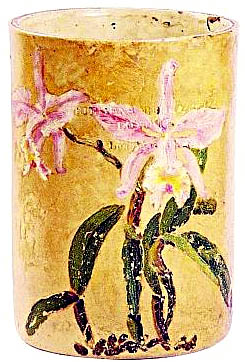
Orchid (orched) (c. 1940)
Size: 14 cm
Medium: Oil on ceramics
Collection: Private collection.

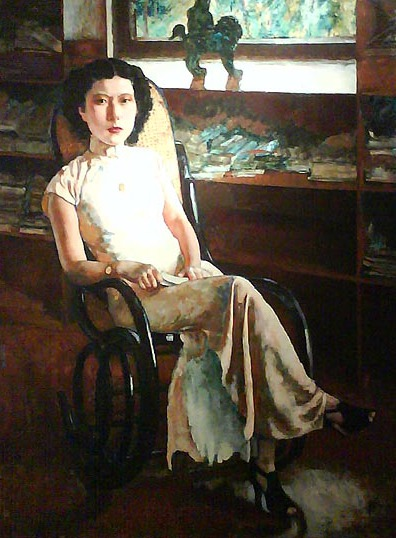
Portrait of Ms Jenny (1939)
Size: unknown
Medium: Oil on canvas
A Cantonese dance hostess from Singapore commissioned by the then-vice-consul of Belgium to Singapore.

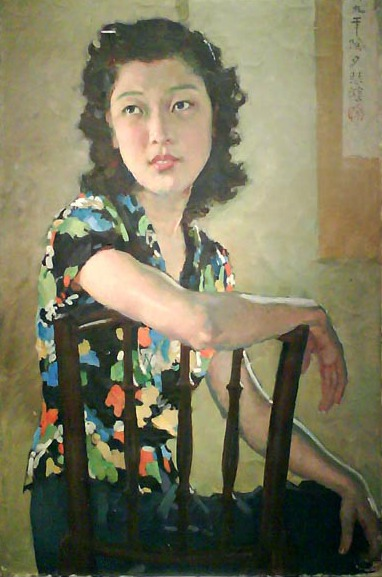
Portrait Of Young Lady (1940)
Size: 82 x 54 cm
Medium: Oil on canvas
This portrait, completed in JiangXia Tang (江夏堂) in Singapore, was of Christina Li HuiWang, who became the first wife of Asian mogul Loke Wan Tho.

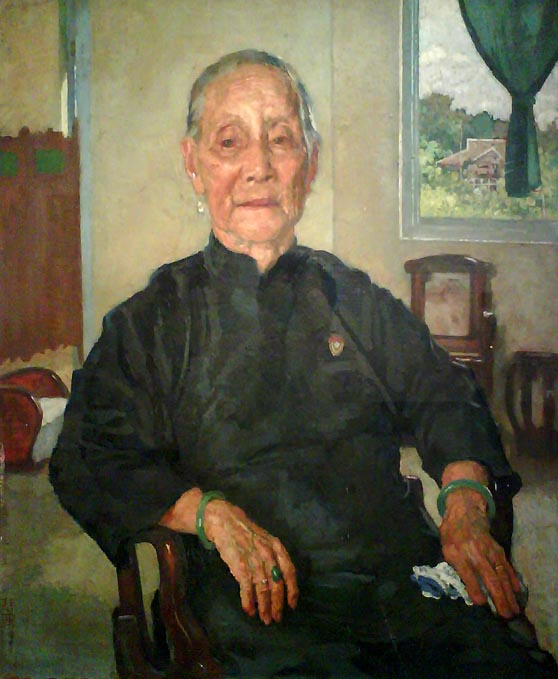
Portrait of Madam Cheng (1941)
Size: 79.5 x 65 cm
Medium: Oil on board
Painted by Xu in Ipoh, when Cheng was 92 who was the mother of Cheong Chee (1885-1954), a wealthy Chinese tin miner and philanthropist in Malaya.

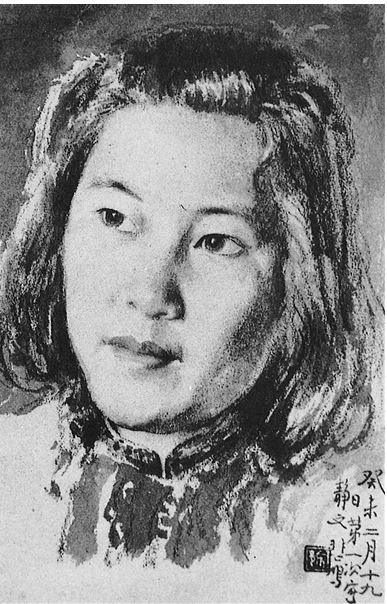
Liao Jingwen (1943)
Size: unknown
Medium: Ink on paper
Painting of Liao Jingwen finished in 1943 when Liao had just begun working for Xu at the China Academy of Art.

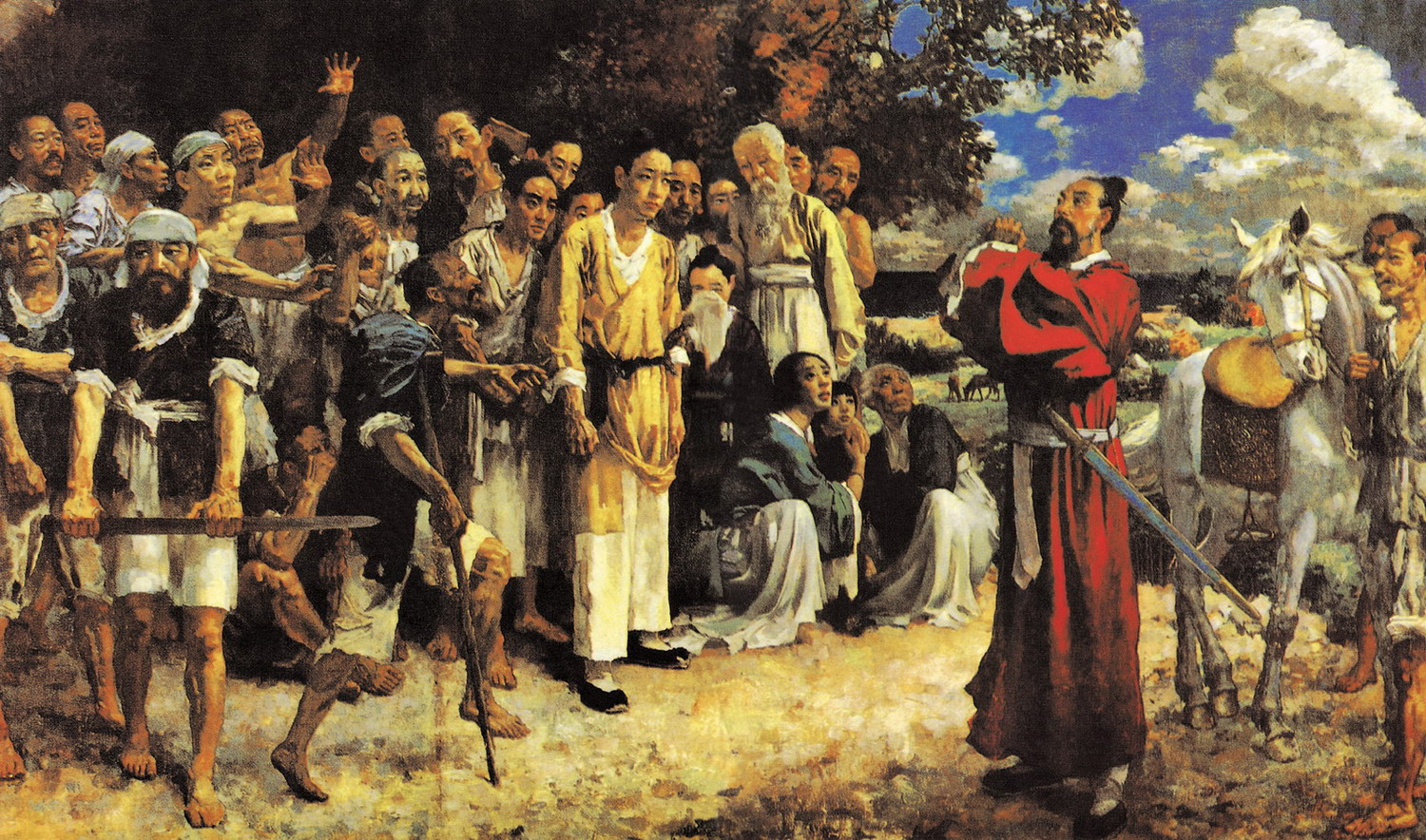
Dian Heng and Five hundreds heroes (1930)

== Personal life ==
Xu Beihong went to Japan to study arts in 1917. Jiang Biwei, who was already engaged to another man, went with him to Japan without the consent of her family. Her family said that she had died to cover their embarrassment. In 1927, Xu Beihong and Jiang Biwei had a son and a daughter. Three years later, Xu Beihong had a love affair with his student Sun Duoci. The affair ended with Jiang Biwei's intervention, but the damage to their marriage was done. This account is questioned in a biography written by Xu Beihong's later wife – Liao Jingwen states that there was no improper relationship between Xu Beihong and the student. It goes on to describe how Jiang Biwei was having an affair herself with the married official Zhang Daofan. It was Zhang who suggested Xu had been having an improper relationship in order to further drive a wedge between the couple. However, finally their 20-year painful relationship ended with a divorce in 1945. In 1942, Xu Beihong took Liao Jingwen, a librarian who took care of his life, as his mistress. They married in 1946. They had a son and a daughter.

== Other media ==
A 24-episode historic television series depicting Xu's life from early adulthood until 1949 was produced in Hebei and aired in Chinese television in 2013.
