= List of Chinese films of the 1950s =

This is a list of films produced in the early People's Republic of China ordered by year of release in the 1950s. For an alphabetical listing of Chinese films see Category:Chinese films

== 1950 ==
Title	Chinese Title	Director	Actors	Genre	Notability
Corruption	腐蚀	Huang Zuolin	Shi Hui	Drama	
The Life of Wu Xun	武训传	Sun Yu	Zhao Dan	Biographical	
Peaceful Spring	太平春	Sang Hu	Shi Hui, Shangguan Yunzhu	Drama	
This Life of Mine	我这一辈子	Shi Hui	Shi Hui		
The White Haired Girl	白毛女	Shui Hua, Wang Bin	Tian Hua	Drama	

== 1951 ==
Title	Chinese Title	Director	Actors	Genre	Notability
Arise United Toward Tomorrow	团结起来到明天	Zhao Ming	Bai Yang	Drama	
The Married Couple	我们夫妇之间	Zheng Junli	Zhao Dan, Jiang Tianliu, Wu Yin	Drama	
New Heroes and Heroines	新儿女英雄传	Shi Dongshan, Lü Ban	Jin Xin, Yao Xiangli	War	
Platoon Commander Guan	关连长	Shi Hui	Shi Hui	War	
Red Banner on the Emerald Ridge	翠岗红旗	Zhang Junxiang	Yu Lan	War	Also known as Banner Over Green Cliff and Red Flag on the Green Hill
Reunion After Victory	胜利重逢	Tang Xiaodan	Feng Zhe	War	
Sisters Stand Up	姊姊妹妹站起来	Chen Xihe	Li Meng, Li Wei	Drama	

== 1952 ==
Title	Chinese Title	Director	Actors	Genre	Notability
From Victory to Victory	南征北战	Cheng Yin, Tang Xiaodan	Chen Ge, Feng Zhe	War	
A Window on America	美国之窗	Shi Hui, Huang Zuolin, Ye Ming	Yu Fei, Shi Hui	Drama	The last independent production from the Wenhua Film Company prior to its nationalization

== 1953 ==
Title	Chinese Title	Director	Actors	Genre	Notability
Bless the Children	为孩子们祝福	Zhao Dan	Huang Zongying, Qi Mengshi	Children	

== 1954 ==
Title	Chinese Title	Director	Actors	Genre	Notability
Letter with Feather	鸡毛信	Shi Hui	Cai Yuanyuan	War/Children	
Liang Shanbo and Zhu Yingtai	梁山伯与祝英台	Sang Hu, Huang Sha	Yuan Xuefen, Fan Ruijuan	Chinese Opera	
Scouting Across the Yangtze River	渡江侦察记	Tang Xiaodan	Sun Daolin	War	Also known as Reconnaissance across the Yangtze

== 1955 ==
Title	Chinese Title	Director	Actors	Genre	Notability
Dong Cunrui	董存瑞	Guo Wei	Zhang Liang	War/Biographical	Biographical film of the PLA soldier of the same name
Flowers of the Motherland	祖国的花朵	Yan Gong	Zhang Yunying, Li Xixiang, Zhao Weiqing	Children	
The Heavenly Match	天仙配	Shi Hui	Yan Fengying, Wang Shaofang	Opera	
Mysterious Travelling Companion	神秘的旅伴	Lin Nong, Zhu Wenshun	Yin Zhiming, Wang Xiaotang	Thriller/Spy	
Song Jingshi	宋景诗	Zheng Junli, Sun Yu	Cui Wei, Shi Hui	Biographical/Drama	Also known as The Rebels
Storm on the Southern Island	南岛风云	Bai Chen	Shangguan Yunzhu, Sun Daolin	War	
The Tight Web	天罗地网	Gu Eryi	Zhong Shuhuang, Chen Tianguo	Thriller	

== 1956 ==
Title	Director	Actors	Genre	Notability	
Battle on Shangganling Mountain	上甘岭	Lin Shan, Sha Meng	Gao Baosheng	War	
Li Shizhen	李时珍	Shen Fu	Zhao Dan	Biographical	Li Shizhen 16th century pharmacologist
Mother	母亲	Ling Zifeng	Zhang Ruifang, Jin Yan	Drama	
The Proud General	骄傲的将军	Te Wei		Animation Featurette	
Ten O'Clock National Day	国庆十点钟	Wu Tian	Yin Zhiming	Thriller/Spy	

== 1957 ==
Title	Chinese Title	Director	Actors	Genre	Notability
City Without Night	不夜城	Tang Xiaodan	Sun Daolin	Drama	
Family	家	Ye Ming, Chen Xihe	Sun Daolin, Zhang Ruifang, Wang Danfeng	Drama	Adaptation of the Ba Jin novel The Family
New Year's Sacrifice	祝福	Sang Hu	Bai Yang	Drama	Adaptation of the Lu Xun-penned short story "New Year Sacrifice"
The Unfinished Comedy	没有完成的喜剧	Lü Ban	Han Langen, Yin Xiucen	Comedy	
Woman Basketball Player No. 5	女篮5号	Xie Jin	Liu Qiong, Qin Yi	Sports	

== 1958 ==
Title	Chinese Title	Director	Actors	Genre	Notability
Chrysanthemums in Mountains	深山里的菊花	Ling Zifeng	Tian Fang, Chen Lizhong	Drama	

== 1959 ==
Title	Chinese Title	Director	Actors	Genre	Notability
Chuang Tapestry	一幅僮锦	Qian Jiajun		Animation	
Fishing Child	渔童	Wan Guchan		Animation	Shanghai Animation Film Studio
Five Golden Flowers	五朶金花	Wang Jiayi	Mo Zijiang, Yang Likun	Musical/Comedy	
The Lin Family Shop	林家铺子	Shui Hua	Xie Tian, Yu Lan	Drama	Adaptation of the Mao Dun-penned short story
Lin Zexu	林则徐	Zheng Junli	Zhao Dan	Biographical	Biography of Lin Zexu. Alternate title: The Opium Wars
Spring Reigns Everywhere	春满人间	Sang Hu	Bai Yang, Wang Danfeng	Drama	
Nie Er	聂耳	Zheng Junli	Zhao Dan	Biographical	
Qing Chun Zhi Ge		Huaiai Chen	Yi Qin	Drama	Adoptation of Yang Mo's Song of Youth novel.

== Mainland Chinese film production totals ==
Year	Total Films
1950	46
1951	33
1952	8
1953	10
1954	25
1955	24
1956	42
1957	43
1958	108
1959	83

== See also ==
- Cinema of China
- Best 100 Chinese Motion Pictures as chosen by the 24th Hong Kong Film Awards

== Additional sources ==
- 中国影片大典 Encyclopaedia of Chinese Films. 1949.10-1976, 故事片·戏曲片. (2001). Zhong guo ying pian da dian: 1949.10-1976. Beijing: 中国电影出版社 China Movie Publishing House. ISBN 7-106-01508-3
- 中国影片大典 Encyclopaedia of Chinese Films. 1931–1949.9, 故事片·戏曲片. (2005). Zhong guo ying pian da dian: 1931–1949.9. Beijing: 中国电影出版社 China Movie Publishing House. ISBN 7-106-02414-7
