= List of Chinese film directors =

The following is a list of notable film directors from Mainland China.

== B ==
- Bu Wancang (1903–1974)

== C ==
- Cai Chusheng (1906–1968), major leftist filmmaker in the 1930s, later fell victim to the Cultural Revolution.
- Cai Shangjun, Chinese screenwriter and director
- Cao Baoping
- Joan Chen (born 1961), Chinese actress and director.
- Chen Kaige (born 1952), major figure of the Fifth Generation, known for his epic Farewell My Concubine was the first Chinese film to win Cannes' coveted Palme d'Or.
- Chen Liting (1910–2013) major figure of the second generation.
- Cheng Bugao (1893–1966)

== D ==
- Dai Sijie (born 1954), French novelist and director, born in China.
- Diao Yi'nan (born 1969), screenwriter and director.
- Domee Shi (born 1989), Chinese-Canadian storyboard artist and director, first woman director of a Pixar short film, Bao (film)

== F ==
- Feng Gong (born 1957), comedic actor and sometimes-director.
- Feng Xiaoning (born 1954), art designer turned director, part of the 1982 graduating class of the Beijing Film Academy
- Feng Xiaogang (born 1958), director of popular films, including several "New Year" genre films.
- Fei Mu (1906–1951), major auteur of the 1930s and 1940s, famed for his masterpiece, Spring in a Small Town.

== G ==
- Gao Qunshu
- Gao Xiaosong (born 1969)
- Gu Changwei (born 1957), Chinese cinematographer for many years, has directed two films.
- Guan Hu (born 1969), Sixth-generation director
- Xiaolu Guo (born 1973), Chinese-British film director and novelist.

== H ==
- He Jianjun (born 1960), Sixth Generation director.
- He Ping (born 1957), director known for mixing Chinese and Western tropes.
- He Qun (born 1956), a graduate of the 1982 class of the BFA as a member of the art department; later shifted to direction, including Country Teachers, the Golden Rooster winner of 1994.
- Hou Hsiao-hsien (born 1947), leading figure in Taiwan's New Wave cinema.
- Hou Yong (born 1960), noted cinematographer for Tian Zhuangzhuang, Zhang Yimou, and others; occasional film director (2004's Jasmine Women).
- Hu Mei (born 1956), female Fifth Generation director.
- Huang Jianxin (born 1954), Fifth Generation director known for his films set in urban environments.
- Huang Shuqin (born 1940), female film director.
- Huang Zuolin (born 1906–1994), important playwright and film director; a student of Bernard Shaw.
- Ann Hui, (born 1947), major female director based in Hong Kong, and a leading figure of the Hong Kong New Wave.
- Huo Jianqi (born 1958), commercially successful film director.

== J ==
- Jia Zhangke (born 1970), leading figure of China's Sixth Generation.
- Jiang Wen (born 1963), famous Chinese leading man-turned-director.
- Jian Yi (born 1975), Chinese independent filmmaker, artist, social entrepreneur. Founder of IFChina Original Studio

== L ==
- Li Pingqian (1902-1984)
- Li Shaohong (born 1955), female Fifth Generation director.
- Li Wenbing (Fei Xing)
- Li Yang (born 1959), Sixth Generation director notable for his film Blind Shaft.
- Li Yu (born 1973), female director.
- Ling Zifeng (1917-1999).
- Liu Bingjian (born 1963), Sixth Generation director.
- Liu Fendou (born 1969), primarily a screenwriter for Zhang Yang, Liu has recently branched into producing and directing (for the 2004 film Green Hat).
- Liu Hao (born 1968).
- Liu Jiayin (born 1981), experimental filmmaker.
- Liu Miaomiao (born 1962), female Fifth Generation director.
- Lou Ye (born 1965), Sixth Generation director whose many run-ins with state authorities have hampered his filmmaking opportunities.
- Lu Chuan (born 1970), Sixth Generation director notable for the environmental drama Kekexili: Mountain Patrol.
- Lu Xuechang (born 1964), Sixth Generation director.
- Lü Yue (born 1957), Fifth Generation cinematographer-turned-director.
- Luo Luo

== M ==
- Ma-Xu Weibang (1905–1961)
- Ma Liwen (born 1971), female Chinese director.

== N ==
- Ning Hao (born 1977)
- Ning Ying (born 1959)

== P ==
- Peng Xiaolian (born 1953), female Fifth Generation Chinese director known for her Shanghai-based films.

== Q ==
- Vivian Qu, female director of the award-winning filmTrap Street, and the producer of Black Coal, Thin Ice.

== S ==
- Shao Zuiweng (Runje Shaw, 1896–1975), founder of Tianyi Film Company and director of many of its films.
- Shen Fu (1905–1994), major director who emerged in post-war China with important films like Myriad of Lights.
- Shen Xiling (1904–1940), important director during the 1930s.
- Sheng Zhimin, independent film director.
- Shi Dongshan (1902-1955), Lianhua Film Company director active in the 1930s and 1940s.
- Shi Hui (1915–1957), actor and director; committed suicide during the Anti-Rightist Campaign.
- Shui Hua (1916-1995), major director of the 1950s and 1960s.
- Shi Runjiu (born 1969), young director and part of the Sixth Generation.
- Sun Daolin (1921-2007), veteran actor and director.
- Sun Yu (1900–1990), one of the most important early directors of Chinese cinema.

== T ==
- Tang Xiaodan (born 1910).
- Tian Zhuangzhuang (born 1952), major Fifth Generation director, his 1993 film Blue Kite was banned by China with Tian forced out of filmmaking for nearly ten years before his return with Springtime in a Small Town in 2001.
- Tsui Hark (born 1951), major male director based in Hong Kong, and a leading figure of the Hong Kong New Wave, known for his Once Upon a Time in China film series.

== W ==
- Wan brothers, animators.
  - Wan Laiming (1900–1997)
  - Wan Guchan (1900–1995)
  - Wan Chaochen (1906–1992)
  - Wan Dihuan (born 1900s)
- Wang Bing (born 1967), documentary filmmaker.
- Wang Chao (born 1964), Sixth Generation filmmaker.
- Wang Guangli (born 1966), modern Chinese director, active since 1997.
- Nanfu Wang (born 1985), documentary filmmaker from Jiangxi.
- Wang Ping (born 1916), the first female director of the People's Republic of China.
- Wang Quan'an (born 1965), Sixth Generation director, and winner of the 2007 Golden Bear for his film, Tuya's Marriage.
- Wang Shuo (born 1958), famous novelist, screenwriter, and one-time director of the film, Father
- Wang Xiaoshuai (born 1966), leading Sixth Generation filmmaker.
- Wei Shiyu Louisa Hong Kong–based female Chinese filmmaker, script translator, producer and educator.
- Wong Kar-wai (born 1958), Hong Kong film director, born in Shanghai.
- Wu Shixian (born 1975), Venice and Sundance Film Festival-winning Chinese American writer-director (aka Dayyan Eng) born in Taiwan. Also directed the popular indie romantic comedy Waiting Alone.
- Wu Tianming (born 1939), a member of the so-called "Fourth Generation," his role as head of the Xi'an Film Studio meant he often oversaw the works of several of his successors, notably Zhang Yimou and Chen Kaige.
- Wu Wenguang (born 1956), documentary filmmaker.
- Wu Yigong (born 1938), director active in the 1980s and early 1990s, also a film producer.
- Wu Yonggang (1907–1982), a major director from the 1930s, perhaps best known for his silent film, The Goddess.
- Wu Ziniu (born 1953), Fifth Generation director.

== X ==
- Xia Gang (born 1953), Fifth Generation director.
- Xiao Jiang (born 1972)
- Xie Fei (born 1942)
- Xie Jin (born 1923), veteran director active since the 1960s.
- Xu Jinglei (born 1974), popular actress and director.

== Y ==
- Edward Yang (1947–2007), major figure of Taiwan's New Wave cinema, best known for his film Yi Yi.
- Yang Fengliang, Chinese film director in the 1980s and 1990s.
- Yang Lina (born 1972), female documentary film director
- Yin Lichuan (born 1973), female director.
- Ying Liang (born 1976), independent film director.
- Ying Yunwei (1904-1967)
- Yuan Muzhi (1909–1978), actor and director who gained prominence in the 1930s.

== Z ==
- Zhang Guoli (born 1955), actor turned director.
- Zhang Jianya (born 1951), Fifth Generation director, noted for his urban comedies and more recently for his action/thriller films.
- Zhang Junxiang (1911–1996)
- Zhang Junzhao (1952–2018), Fifth Generation director.
- Zhang Lu (born 1962), Chinese director of Korean ethnicity.
- Zhang Nuanxin (1941–1995), female Chinese director, best known for her work Sacrifice of Youth (1985).
- Zhang Shichuan (1890–1954), one of the founding fathers of Chinese cinema.
- Zhang Yang (born 1967)
- Zhang Yibai (born 1963), Chongqing-born filmmaker, known for his urban dramas.
- Zhang Yimou (born 1950), one of the most successful Fifth Generation directors, Zhang's more recent films reflect a shift towards big budget historical epics.
- Zhang Yuan (born 1963), major figure of the Sixth Generation.
- Zhao Wei (born 1976), famous Chinese leading female actor-turned-director.
- Zheng Junli (1911–1969), actor-director.
- Zheng Zhengqiu (1889–1935), often considered one of the founding fathers of Chinese cinema, associated with the Mingxing Film Company.
- Zheng Xiaolong (born 1953), one of the most successful TV series directors in mainland China, board director of China Film Academy. His award-winning TV series include "Golden Marriage" in 2008 and 2009, as well as "Legend of Zhen Huan" in 2012.
- Zhou Chengzhou (born 1982), He focuses on filmmaking in the field of spiritual awareness.
- Zhou Xiaowen (born 1954), Fifth Generation director.
- Zhou Bing (born 1968), one of the most famous documentary film director in China, works including The Forbidden City, South of the Ocean, Buddha and the Snow Leopards, etc.
- Zhu Shilin (1899–1967)
- Zhu Wen, (born 1969) author and director.
