= Vegetarianism and veganism in China =

Vegetarianism and veganism are growing trends in China. Public Radio International estimated in 2013 that 4–5% of China's population was vegetarian, representing over 50 million people.

Like many other languages, Chinese did not have a native word for the English word "vegan" and often uses (Chinese: 纯素; pinyin: Chún sù, "pure vegetarian") to refer to it. In 2020, the Beijing-based Good Food Fund had a national call for finding one established Chinese character to represent "vegan"; the ancient character 茻 stood out. Pronounced “mǎng”, this character is rarely used in modern contexts. The dictionary definition of 茻 is “densely growing plants”, and according to the China Vegan Society, it represents "a world filled with sprouting plants, vibrant and green". Each of the four 屮 that make up 茻 represents a sprouting plant. In ancient Chinese, there are four characters composed entirely from 屮:

- 屮 (chè): plants sprouting
- 艸 (cǎo): grass
- 芔 (huì): a general term for plants
- 茻 (mǎng): densely growing plants

These four characters represent the spectrum of plant-based lifestyles, from a less plant-based lifestyle (屮) to 100% plant-based or vegan (茻). The idea is to move more people toward 茻 on this spectrum.

== History ==
=== Spring and Autumn period ===
Vegetarianism in China originated from the Taoist and Confucian practice of zhai (斋) asceticism, first appearing in the Spring and Autumn period, a period of Chinese history from approximately 770 to 476 BCE. Zhai (斋) is defined as the "practice of purifying the body and mind by abstaining from distracting thoughts and stimulating foods (including meat) during mourning periods or in preparation for prayer ceremonies." However, abstinence from the consumption of meat was not initially standard during the early stages of the practice of zhai asceticism. According to Wong, the earliest evidence of explicit vegetarian ritual practices during this period could be found in the Book of Etiquette and Ceremonial.

=== Tang and Song dynasties ===
Although already prevalent in China, vegetarianism flourished following the spread of Buddhism during the Tang dynasty. Buddhism teaches boundless compassion for all beings and nonviolence and therefore prohibits Buddhist monks from killing animals for food or accepting meat as offerings. During the Song dynasty, vegetarianism continued to flourish as agricultural technology developed, enabling the farming of a greater variety of fruits, vegetables, and grains. During this period, the first vegetarian restaurant was opened and the first vegetarian cookbook was written. The first imitation meats in China can also be traced back to this period with the development of food products such as rolled-tofu chicken.

=== Republican Era ===
Vegetarianism in China did not undergo significant changes until the Republican Era, a period lasting from 1912 to 1949, during which vegetarianism went beyond the narrative of Buddhism in seeking science and philosophy as its theoretical basis. The first secular Chinese vegetarian movement, led by Wu Tingfang and Sun Yat-sen, was driven by elite politicians, revolutionaries, and businessmen of the time. These activists sought the establishment of a modern state and the transformation of China's national character as a wider political goal, and therefore campaigned to popularize the language of Western modern science to explain food, nutrition and health. They believed that developing vegetarianism could help China to devote more resources to strengthening the nation and fighting foreign oppression. However, they failed to implement their secular vision of vegetarianism on the dietary habits of the time.

=== The People's Republic of China ===
Following the establishment of the People's Republic of China in 1949 under Mao Zedong, meat became a luxury for most Chinese families. Following the reform and opening-up of the Chinese economy during the 1970s and 80s, improved economic growth made meat more affordable and accessible for ordinary people in China. Meat became a staple of the Chinese diet, and its absence became synonymous with malnutrition. Moreover, the Chinese Communist Party did not allow western vegan and vegetarian movements to spread within Chinese society.

During the 2010s, the second movement of vegetarianism took place in China, developing as a response to consumerism, health crises and ecological degradation. Vegetarianism and Veganism have been emerging further ever since, especially among the younger generations. The 2010s were also marked by the Party encouraging vegetarianism and veganism. The Chinese Communist Party has also recommended individuals cut their meat consumption as a measure motivated by concerns over public health and greenhouse gas emissions.

=== China Vegan Society ===
On May 25, 2021, the International Biodiversity Day, the China Vegan Society was formally launched under the China Biodiversity Conservation and Green Development Foundation, a Beijing-based national public foundation. The launching ceremony was held in Dali, Yunnan, after an unsettling night of an earthquake of over 6 on Richter scale and many others of minor scales. Regardless of risks and uncertainties, the ceremony went ahead with more than 100 participants staying for the event. Influential figures such as Peter Singer, Jane Goodall, Joaquin Phoenix, Jeongkwan, as well as representatives from vegan communities across the globe sent their video messages. Founded by Jian Yi, a filmmaker, an activist and the founder of the Good Food Fund, the China Vegan Society set out to provide public goods for the Chinese vegan community, diversify the movement and bring vegan lifestyle to mainstream, train the next generation leaders and serve as a window between Chinese vegan community and vegan communities around the globe. As of August 2023, the China Vegan Society has organized one Vegan Festival, one Vegan Summit, a series of Vegan Markets across China, and has launched a vegan event app, and published the nation's first vegan food certification system.

== The vegan and vegetarian economy ==
China represents 53% of the global meat substitute market, estimated to be worth $16 billion, representing a massive portion of a prospering and growing market. China possesses a large domestic market for plant proteins, with companies such as Zrou and La Mian Shuo producing plant-based meat substitutes (GMA, 2022). According to research conducted by the USDA's Foreign Agricultural Service, there have been approximately 12 new plant-based meat companies started successfully in China since 2019. China is also a major exporter of plant proteins and raw materials for the production of imitation meats internationally (GMA, 2022). Milk substitution is also a large market in China, as milk from animals was previously hard to produce due to polluted water sources and poor hygiene standards. China's coffee industry began to expand with the proliferation of big-brand coffee shops in China such as Starbucks and Luckin, increasing the demand for milk. The market for milk substitutes has since expanded in China, with sales of milk substitutes increasing by 20% between 2015 and 2017, mainly dominated by soy milk.

== State encouragement ==
Per capita meat consumption in China reached 63 kg per capita in 2021. If the rising trend in meat consumption continues, it is predicted that per capita meat consumption in China could rise to 93 kg by 2030. Due to environmental and health concerns, the Chinese state has advocated for a reduction in individual meat consumption. China has pledged to see its carbon emissions peak in 2030 and aims to achieve carbon neutrality by 2060. Globally, 14.5% of emissions contributing to climate change emanate from the keeping and eating of cows, chickens, pigs and other livestock. In addition, deforestation for livestock and the widespread use of fertilisers also have harmful ecological effects. Agricultural policy has become a central focus of the Chinese state as a tool to achieve its environmental goals. In 2016, as part of its pledge to reduce carbon emissions and improve public health, the Chinese government released new dietary guidelines aiming to cut the country's meat intake by 50%. These new guidelines called on citizens to consume just 40-75g of meat a day, reducing annual per capita meat consumption to 14 kg-27 kg. Should these guidelines be followed, carbon dioxide equivalent emissions from China's livestock industry would be reduced by 1bn tonnes by 2030.

Li Junfeng, director general of China's National Center on Climate Change Strategy and International Cooperation, commented: "Through this kind of lifestyle change, it is expected that the livestock industry will transform and carbon emissions will be reduced… tackling climate change involves scientific judgement, political decisions, entrepreneurial support, but at last, it still relies on the involvement of the general public to change the consumption behaviour in China. Every single one of us has to believe in the low-carbon concept and slowly adapt to it".

At the 2020 annual "two sessions" parliament, Sun Baoguo, a member of the Chinese People's Political Consultative Conference, called for more investment, regulation and promotion of artificial meat. State bodies such as the National Natural Science Foundation of China have granted funding to alt-protein research teams. Since 2020, the Ministry of Science and Technology has offered a program of competitive research and development grants for alt-protein biomanufacturing projects. In 2022, the Chinese Ministry of Agriculture and Rural Affairs released a new Five-Year Agricultural Plan, which for the first time mentions cultivated meat, suggesting that Chinese officials believe that the production of cultivated meat is in the national interest. In addition, the Bioeconomy Five-Year Plan instructs ministries to increase investment into alt-protein development research projects. This is also motivated in part by supply chain and food security concerns, as China's livestock industry is heavily dependent on imported soybeans, particularly from the United States, for use as animal feed. The development of manufactured proteins is therefore seen by many Chinese officials as a route to food independence.

== Social attitudes to veganism and vegetarianism ==
Vegan and vegetarian movements in China have been met with mild scepticism, particularly due to the rising middle class associating the consumption of pork with wealth and prosperity. Meat consumption has continually been on the rise throughout mainland China in tandem with the growth of the Chinese economy. Pork is especially popular, with China consuming 50% of the world's pork (GMA, 2022).

== Religion ==
Buddhism plays a key role in shaping attitudes toward veganism in the modern day, despite China's state secularity. While only 18% of the population is believed to be Buddhist, an additional 21% of people assimilate Buddhist philosophy into their daily beliefs as well. With Buddhism's heavy emphasis on a plant-based diet, there is already a positive sentiment among 39% of the population for vegetarianism.

== COVID-19 ==
The COVID-19 pandemic in China has had a significant impact on Chinese diets in that it motivated a shift towards vegetarianism and veganism. A survey of Chinese citizens found that many individuals shifted towards a more plant-based diet during lockdown, in part motivated by safety concerns over the contamination of meat. Wet markets selling live poultry and mammals for consumption have historically been vectors for the spread of disease in China, with some identifying the Huanan Seafood Wholesale Market in Wuhan as the source of COVID-19. For example, salmon consumption in China dropped after COVID-19 was detected in salmon imported from Norway being sold at the Beijing Seafood Market, south China's largest aquatic market, leading several merchants to cease the sale of salmon. In response to these newfound consumer preferences and market scarcity, large chains throughout China have begun offering vegan alternatives on their menus. In addition, the dietary changes of many survey respondents were motivated by the desire to lose weight.

== See also ==
- Vegetarianism by country
