= Long Live the Missus! =

- Theatrical release poster
- Traditional Chinese: 太太萬歲
- Simplified Chinese: 太太万岁
- Directed by: Sang Hu
- Written by: Eileen Chang
- Starring: Jiang Tianliu; Zhang Fa; Shangguan Yunzhu; Shi Hui; Wang Yi; Lu Shan; Han Fei
- Cinematography: Huang Shaofen
- Edited by: Fu Jixiu
- Music by: Zhang Zhengjiu
- Color process: Black and white
- Production company: Wenhua Film Company
- Release date: 13 December 1947
- Running time: 112 minutes
- Country: Republic of China
- Language: Mandarin

Long Live the Missus! (traditional Chinese: 太太萬歲; simplified Chinese: 太太万岁; pinyin: Tàitai Wànsuì) is a 1947 Chinese romantic comedy film known as one of the best comedies of the civil war era. The film was directed by Sang Hu (桑弧) with a screenplay written by the famous Chinese literary figure Eileen Chang; the pair also collaborated on the 1947 film Unending Love (Bu Liao Qing, 1947). The film was produced in Shanghai by the Wenhua Film Company. Long Live the Missus! offers a satirical depiction of the lives of women, male-female relationships, and the institution of marriage in 1940s Shanghai.

The film is an example of how the writer Eileen Chang interpreted the Western comedy of manners for Chinese audiences. An English-subtitled version of the film, based on a translation of the filmscript by Christopher Rea, is available on YouTube.

== Cast ==
- Jiang Tianliu (蒋天流) as Chen Sizhen, protagonist, capable housewife, and dutiful daughter-in-law;
- Zhang Fa (张伐) as Tang Zhiyuan, Sizhen's husband, initially a banker who later starts his own company with his father-in-law’s money;
- Shangguan Yunzhu (上官云珠) as Shi Mimi, the mistress of Zhiyuan; she is already married, but her husband uses her to scam money from other men;
- Wang Yi (汪漪) as Tang Zhiqin, Zhiyuan's younger sister, who is romantically interested in Sizhen’s brother and ends up marrying him;
- Han Fei (韩非) as Chen Sirui, Sizhen’s younger brother, and Tang Zhiqin’s romantic interest who ends up marrying her;
- Lu Shan (路珊) as Sizhen's mother-in-law;
- Shi Hui (石挥) as Old Mr. Chen, Sizhen's father, a wealthy old man who is seduced by Shi Mimi’s friend, Linlin;
- Lin Zhen (林榛) as Sizhen's mother;
- Cui Chaoming (崔超明) as Lawyer Yang, Zhiyuan’s good friend, who prepares the legal documents for the main couple’s divorce and the young couple’s marriage;
- Sun Yi (孙仪) as Maid Zhang, who works in the household of Shizhen's mother-in-law;
- Su Yun (苏芸) as Ma Linlin, Shi Mimi's friend and seductress;
- Cheng Zhi (程之) as Brother Shi, Shi Mimi's husband who pretends to be her brother in order to use her to scam other men;
- Tian Zhendong (田振东) as Old Mr. Zhou, Zhiyuan’s friend who invites him to Hong Kong in search of business opportunities;
- Jin Gang (金刚) as Shopkeeper, from whom Chen Sirui buys pineapples to gift to his sister’s mother-in-law;
- Cao Wei (曹韦) as Deputy Manager Xue, who embezzles money from Zhiyuan’s company, leaving him bankrupt;
- Gao Xiao'ou (高笑鸥) as New Friend, who Sizhen and Zhiyuan witness as the next victim to fall to Shi Mimi’s cons.

== Plot ==
The movie is set in 1947 and China is amid a civil war. Chen Sizhen is a married woman in a middle-class Shanghai family whose well-intentioned white lies meant to help family members turn out to be increasingly counter-productive, resulting in events that harm her marriage and eventually, her family finances. Her husband, Tang Zhiyuan, an ambitious but utterly incompetent bank clerk, launches a business with the financial support of his father-in-law, which Sizhen helps him secure. Blinded by the stability provided by his short-term financial gain, he falls prey to the seduction of a gold digger, Shi Mimi, and neglects his new company. As a result, his deputy manager embezzles all of his money, and the company goes bankrupt. Despite his infidelity, he blames Sizhen for his misfortune and demands a divorce. Mimi and her husband attempt to drain the rest of Zhiyuan’s money, but Sizhen forestalls the extortion attempt by outwitting Mimi and thus bails her husband out of trouble. As a result, a grateful Zhiyuan changes his mind and wishes to cancel his proposed divorce. Nonetheless, Sizhen decides that she wants to go through with the divorce. At the last moment, however, Sizhen changes her mind and recommits to her marriage at the lawyer’s office. As the reconciled couple celebrate at a café, they spot and observe Mimi using her seduction methods on a new man.

== Production ==
Screenplay

Eileen Chang (Zhang AiLing (张爱玲)) was already a well-known essayist and novelist in China before entering the film industry. She became a screenwriter because she was “blacklisted from publishing after Japan’s defeat" due to her relationship with the top collaborationist official Hu Lancheng. Filmmaking then became an alternative way as both self-expression and employment since the film industry was struggling during the postwar period and was more tolerable of talents and celebrities' moral problems. In the 1940s, Shanghai's film industry experienced high demand for domestically produced romantic tragedies and transplanted Hollywood love stories in local settings. Chang was aware of this trend, and noted that Chinese films at the time were "practically all on the subject of love… Love which leads to a respectable marriage”. This film, addressing the topic of love, has been associated most strongly with Chang’s philosophical vision expressing the plight of Shanghai's middle-class women within the home and her relationships (romance, marriage, and family).

As film scripts were rarely written by women in this period or even in early Chinese film history, and as the only surviving script of the two that Chang wrote that year, Long Live the Missus! embodies the "role of female creators in the anti-film mechanism of 'male gaze' and the 'female writing' against the symbolization of women". It was the director’s idea to make the movie into a comedy, and Chang choose the women’s life as the center core of this comedy. As she wrote in 1944, "I would rather write nothing except the trivial matters between a man and a woman. There is neither war nor revolution in my work." It marks Eileen Chang’s signature style of a tragic comedy with a bitter-sweet ending where the characters would experience a "little reunion," but no grand finale like the audience typically anticipated. In a review of her own film Long Live the Missus!, Chang says the character "Sizhen's happy ending isn't all that happy." She elaborates that the idea of "a bittersweet mid-life probably means there will always be small pains interwoven in the happy moments, but there are moments of comfort."

Sizhen's choice to reconcile with Zhiyuan might be seen as controversial, especially because the "women's question" was at the forefront of the discussion during the Republican Era. Sizhen is not portrayed as the strong female lead who advocates for her independence and pursues love. Just as Eileen Chang said, "I did not affirm or protect Chen Sizhen. I only mentioned her as such a person." The way Chen Sizhen's character as the protagonist is portrayed is exactly the starting point and foothold of all comedy effects of “Long Live the Missus!” as a comedy film. More importantly, referring to Sizhen only as a person, Chang refuses to discuss the women's problem as "a reductive binarism of women against men, us against them, good against evil." Such refusal has provided Long Live the Missus! the opportunity to subvert the mainstream discussion and cultural discourses at the time. Chang does not depict Sizhen as a mere female victim hurt by men, and even portrays Sizhen as an individual who has the ability to establish relations inside and outside of the family. Chang explains her heroine: "cleverly deals with people in a fairly large family. Out of consideration for the interests of the whole family, she nurses various grievances. But her suffering is almost nothing compared with the agonizing sacrifices Chinese women made in the old times... We should not look at her as a victim of the social system, since her behavior is out of her own free will." Chang is aware of the discussion of the woman's question since the May Fourth Movement, and the women who suffered because of the social system, yet she believes that Long Live the Missus! could explore more potentials of the portrayal of female characters and stories.

The themes and subjects of Long Live the Missus! are similar to those of Chang's wartime writings like Love in a Fallen City looking at the private space of love, marriage, family, and domestic conflicts. Long Live the Missus! integrates the Hollywood style comedy of “pursuit of happiness”, Chinese traditional love stories, and tragic romance that involves courtship, marriage, and threats of divorce.

Director Sang Hu considerably lightened the tone of Eileen Chang's original script of the film. Chang's original intention for the film was to create a more humanist film, affirming basic human nature in the form of a "silent drama." However, to ensure its box office success, the film was made to be a "Hollywood-style comedy with coincidences and witty dialogues."

Historical Background

The “War of Resistance Against China” started in 1931 and ended in 1945. This invasion caused China’s economy to experience hyperinflation between 1937 and 1949 due to the three governments (the Nationalists, the Japanese, and the Communists) all issuing their own currency. The price of common commodities rose constantly, and the unemployment rate skyrocketed. The hyperinflation was analogous to a never ending plague during this time. It wasn’t until 1948 when "the People’s Bank of China was established [and] the Communists replaced almost all of their local issues with a unified paper money called “People’s Currency.”” The Chinese hyperinflation ended in 1949.

Long Live the Missus! was produced the same year that the storyline was set in, and as such, issues represented in the film often resonated with the current events of 1947. For example, there are multiple scenes in the film that show the hyperinflation; for example, when the house maid asks for a wage increase due to the inflation.

Sound

The sound technicians of this film are Shen Yimin and Zhu Weigang. Shen also worked on Miserable at Middle Age in 1949 with director Sang Hu.

Sound effects, mainly non-diegetic ones, are another dimension that has enhanced the film's comicality. On several occasions, the use of sound accompanies Sizhen's laughter-arousing white lies to intensify the comic result or increase the contrast. In the scene where she lies about the broken bowl, every time Sizhen tries to remove the broken piece, there is background music coinciding with the visual image. Her second lie, regarding Zhiyuan's means of travel, comes with the same uplifting and cheerful tune when Zhiyuan boards and disembarks the plane. Similar to Sizhen's lies, Shi Mimi's purposely leaving a handkerchief with her lipstick stains on it in Zhiyuan's suit pocket is carried out with funny melody. Later, when Sizhen accidentally pulls it out, the same music appears, but only to lead to the irony that Sizhen even decides to cover up Zhiyuan's affair in front of the maid.

Set Design

Set Designer Wang Yuebai is an art director and production designer employed by Wenhua Film Company. He is known for his involvement in Night Inn, and The Secret of the Magic Gourd in 1963. Like Shen Weigang, Wang also collaborated with the crew again in Miserable at Middle Age.

Costume Design

The Costume designer is Qi Qiuming, who also worked on Night Inn and Miserable at Middle Age.

Casting

The leading cast members include Shangguan Yunzhu, Jiang Tianliu, Zhang Fa, and Shi Hui, all of whom had originally performed in stage dramas during the war under Japanese rule. The film had initially planned to let Wang Danfeng play the supporting actress. However, she failed to participate in the filming, and the character was adjusted to be performed by Shangguan Yunzhu.

Budget

Long Live the Missus! is a well-made small-budget film. Despite the often awkward camera movements (perhaps a result of the limited financial support), the characterization and plot are enlivened by the witty, incisive dialogues that are a distinct hallmark of Chang's wartime fiction.

== Themes ==
Marriage & Family

Long Live the Missus! tells the story of a middle-class family. Through the repressed state of women under the traditional patriarchal culture, it shows "the value crisis encountered by traditional morality, family, ethical structure and gender relations at the turn of the new era". It centers on women dealing with pressure and expectation to conform to family roles as a dutiful daughter-in-law, a child-bearer, and a good wife. Traditionally, it was common for several generations to live under one roof together, and the wife would move in with her husband’s family, which is the case in this film. The mother runs the household and treats the daughter-in-law in a grating manner which is made clear when Sizhen is seen constantly waiting on her mother-in-law's hand and foot. Missus is an English translation of the Mandarin word tai tai, meaning “wife” or a wealthy married woman who does not work. In particular, tai tai in the context of the film refers to the socialized aspects of a wife in the domestic context and the somewhat scheming nature of the women.

Sizhen’s central position in her domestic world consists of her absolute and stoical dedication to the needs of her husband and her family. From asking her brother to buy pineapples for her mother-in-law to changing her husband’s shoes and listening to his complaints, Sizhen strives to be a good wife who is willing to compromise and sacrifice herself in her complicated family relationships. She is willing to please everyone and be at their service, but all she receives from them is abuse (especially from her husband and mother-in-law who blame her for lying to her father about the gold bars). Sizhen’s dishonest behaviour is therefore “her comedic means of survival within a limited, oppressive situation”. Yet, the movie romanticizes her oppressive marriage and domestic life through her elegant look and fashion, which is achieved by the extravagant silk qipao, handbags, sunglasses, and accessories she wears. Given this, the movie may have suggested to female audiences that marriage is not so bad after all, as it comes with the financial benefits of being able to dress well and have leisure time.

Besides the constant devotion to her husband, the couple’s marriage is dull. The unromantic relationship and Sizhen’s failure to bear a child contradicts the warm and affectionate wedding picture that hangs above their bed (a typical custom of modern Shanghai couples). This stark contrast cleverly portrays the “reality of married life versus the ideal of modern marriage.”

While the film conveys the difficulties to become a good "taitai," another theme or moral of the film might suggest that men are unreliable. This is demonstrated when both Old Mr. Chen, Sizhen’s father, and Zhiyuan engage in affairs. Even though Old Mr. Chen was supposed to confront Zhiyuan for betraying his daughter, he too gets sucked in by the wily charms of a young woman, and teaches Zhiyuan how to lie to Sizhen in order to calm her down.

The family conflict focuses on Zhiyuan’s affair. Zhiyuan is repeatedly portrayed near a mirror, creating a doubling effect. The doubling of Zhiyuan in the mirror symbolizes the two-faced quality of his character based on how he acts as a husband towards his wife and behind her back. This comedy of errors exposes the moneyed culture and the hypocrisy of Shanghai urbanities, and ridicules bourgeois materialism and decadence through its portrayal of negative male figures.

In addition, the Chinese Civil Code from the 1930s gave individuals, including women, a great deal of liberty to decide and manage their personal events, including freedom of marriage. According to the Civil Code, whether two people were getting married or divorced, they needed to sign the legal documents in front of two witnesses or a lawyer. This was the first time in Chinese history that women had been granted the right to divorce, and it gave Chinese women a chance to leave their miserable marriage legally and freely. In the movie, like many women at the time, Sizhen was ready to save herself from suffering and execute her right to a divorce. The film may therefore suggest the “impending collapse of male, patriarchal authority, and woman’s attempt to extricate herself from her social predicament (as the lead female character Chen Sizhen does) and forge her own way (as represented by the socialite Shi Mimi).”

Deception

The film revolves around a theme of deception. It lampoons the deception and folly of urban, middle-class life. Through its dramatic plot twists and concocted dialogues, characters engage in theatrical gestures, role-playing, and lying, thus highlighting the essentially deceptive nature of human relations. For example, from the beginning, when Maid Zhang breaks the bowl, Sizhen tries to cover it up and hide it from her mother-in-law. She later proceeds to lie to her mother-in-law again, telling her that Zhiyuan plans to take a trip to Hong Kong by boat, which she believes is safer, instead of by plane. Sizhen also lies to her father about Zhiyuan's mother's wealth, which compels her father to help Zhiyuan's business, and eventually leads to the tragedy of her marriage. At the end of the film, she lies to Zhiqin and Sirui about coming to the lawyer's firm for the celebration of their new marriage, not for her divorce with Zhiyuan. However, despite her attempts to conceal information, she is usually found out, therefore linking the theme of deception with exposure. Deception is also seen when Sizhen's little brother lies about where he bought the pineapples, and when Shi Mimi lies about how she "has never told anyone this personal information before", and of course, when Zhiyuan lies about his affair with Shi Mimi. The intent behind the deceptive behaviors in the film differs. On one hand, Sizhen’s lies are mostly altruistic to facilitate the betterment of others. The lies of Zhiyuan and Shi Mimi, on the other hand, aim to promote their self-interest. In all of these instances, the truths being covered up are inevitably revealed and the characters must face the consequences.

== Chinese Comedy of Manners ==
The term comedy of manners refers to the genre of satirical comedy representative of the Restoration period (1660–1710) that challenges and criticizes the manners and social conventions of a highly sophisticated, artificial society.

Despite its Western origin, comedy of manners was appropriated by Eileen Chang for her own aesthetics. What has made Chang's opinion on comedy here remarkable is not so much her acknowledgement of laughing as natural, but her insight into the coexistence of tragic and comic constituents. Comedy provides an effective channel to express the double aspect—bodily instinct and rational intellect—of human lives. This dualistic view on human's living condition is manifested in Chang's opinion on Chen Sizhen. Chang asserted:

"Eventually she has a happy ending, but she is still not particularly happy. The so-called "bittersweet middle age" probably implies that there is always some sadness mingled in their [middle-aged people] happiness. Their sadness however is not completely without comfort. I very much like these few characters' "fushi de beiai" (sadness of the floating life). But it were "fushi de beihuan" (sadness and happiness of the floating life), then it would in fact be more pitiful than "sadness of the floating life," as it contains a feeling of vast vicissitudes."

There are similarities between Long Live the Missus! and the Hollywood screwball comedies, such as the focus on the love conflict/battling process of a (mismatched) couple, juxtaposition (of all male and female, capable and incapable), coincidences and chance encounters in the plot. Long Live the Missus! accounts an ordinary housewife's life. It is set in the most common locale—Shanghai's nongtang, where Chang claimed "there can be several Chen Sizhen in just one house." In contrast, most of the screwball comedies were played out against settings of sheer affluence (a Connecticut estate or a Park Avenue penthouse), properties (elegant clothes, cars, and furniture), and lines (witty and inventive repartee).

Like her narratives on wartime China, Chang’s screenplay parodies the manners and emotions of Shanghai’s middle-class, with a particular focus on the pettiness, hypocrisy and infidelity. Characters such as Sizhen, the noble and forgiving housewife, Zhiyuan, Sizhen’s easily manipulated husband, and Mimi, Zhiyuan’s mistress and con woman, illustrate those shortcomings common to Shanghai urbanites. Here, Chang applies one of her preferred story techniques of “uneven contrast (cenci de duichao)" by portraying these characters as stereotypical of Shanghai middle-class, as none of them are “enlightened or perverse to an extreme."

Chang’s use of techniques, including suspense, plot twists and contradictions forms the foundation for the film’s agency of humor-by-embarrassment. The main conflicts are revealed by Sizhen’s three lies. The first lie results in a conflict between Chen’s mother-in-law and Mama Zhang, the maidservant, the second leads to a false alarm within her family, and the third causes tension between her mother-in-law and father.

== Critical reception ==
As “the fourth of a string of popular Wenhua films,” Long Live The Missus! was widely assailed by the press and has been praised by critics across Taiwan Straits as an ‘absolutely underestimated masterpiece in the history of Chinese cinema’ and considered ‘the best Chinese comedy ever made.’ Long Live The Missus! was positively received partially due to the fact that it had catered to the Shanghai audience's appetite for family melodrama and films that dealt with women in familial and social situations.

Long Live the Missus! has been described as a generally apolitical film in terms of theme and tone, and it is true that issues of rich and poor do not surface in its story. However, much of Eileen Chang’s work contains themes of seduction and betrayal, and this film is not without its ‘political’ points relating to women. In addition to the portrayal of ordinary Shanghai women in a time of economic crisis and cultural conflicts, this film brings awareness to gender relationships, middle-class family life, and the complex politics of Chinese cinema in post-war China.

The film was attached to the biography of Eileen Chang. She was denounced as "a walking corpse from the Occupation period," and her film "encourages the audience to continue indulging in their familiar xiao shimin world of stupor and misery," by asking women to "continue making willing sacrifice."

Chinese scholars Sun Yu and Zheng Xin argue that Sang Hu transformed Eileen Chang's tragic depictions of an "ephemeral age" into a more optimistic and lighthearted perspective using his comic techniques.

In 2005, the film was voted #81 in the list of the Best 100 Chinese Motion Pictures at the Hong Kong Film Awards.
