= This Life of Mine =

This Life of Mine may refer to:

- This Life of Mine (novella), a novella by Lao She
  - This Life of Mine (1950 film), a Chinese film based on the novella
- This Life of Mine (2024 film), a French comedy-drama film
- This Life of Mine, an album by Kareem Salama
