= Jianyi =

Jianyi may refer to:

- Jianyi, Liaoning (建一), a town in Dashiqiao, Liaoning, China

== Historical eras ==
- Jianyi (建義, 385–388), era name used by Qifu Guoren, ruler of Western Qin
- Jianyi (建義, 528), era name used by Emperor Xiaozhuang of Northern Wei

== See also ==
- Jian Yi, Chinese filmmaker
