= Song of Youth =

Song of Youth may refer to:

- Song of Youth (novel), 1958 Chinese novel by Yang Mo
- Song of Youth (album), 2012 Indian album by Yuvan Shankar Raja
- Song of Youth (TV series), 2021 Chinese TV series
