= IFChina Original Studio =

IFChina Original Studio Participatory Documentary Center is a non-profit art and cultural organization in China that utilizes film, photography, oral history, and theater productions to promote local culture and to document history from the perspectives of ordinary Chinese citizens. IFChina was founded in 2008 by Chinese independent filmmaker, artist, and writer Jian Yi, along with Douglas Xiao and Eva Song. Jian Yi co-founded the China Village Documentary Project with filmmaker Wu Wenguang in 2004, which led him to develop IFChina. IFChina is located in Ji'an, Jiangxi province, an inland province. The small city of Ji'an is within the Jinggangshan region, an urban community within a large rural area.

In June 2009, the organization sought to be included under the umbrella of the state-owned Jinggangshan University (JGSU) and established its Participatory Documentary Center on the JGSU campus. Film distributor dGenerate Films reports that “The IFChina team reaches out to people from every walk of life from unemployed workers, school children, college students, migrant workers, to rural women, children, and elderly. RealTime magazine reported that IFChina is China’s first non-profit art and cultural organization that collects and documents the stories of ordinary Chinese. Much of IFChina's work focuses on the self-governance of China’s rural communities and the social and demographic changes occurring due to urban migration, specifically for children and the elderly who have been described as left behind. Emphasis is placed on offering perspectives of the villagers and documenting their daily lives through independent documentary film and theater with the aim to preserve individual and communal memories.

Undertakings include oral history interviewing, participatory documentary workshops, school photography workshops, a documentary theater project, an exploration of Red History and Culture (state efforts to generate public support for its political ideology and legitimacy), a rice collection project called "A Scoop of Rice", which utilizes volunteers to deliver rice or noodles to senior citizens as a compensation for recording their stories, a Happy Rooms mural project, university courses offered in partnership with Jinggangshan University, a Rural Design Workshop, and a planned "Museum of Memories" to collect and preserve the organization's projects. IFChina aims to foster a more civil society and functional world. Funding derives from ARTiSIMPLE Studio in Beijing, the Prince Claus Fund for Culture and Development, and the Narada Foundation, as well as through online private donations for both funding and media equipment.

== See also ==
- Cinema of China
- Oral history in China
- Civic engagement in China
