= Bu Liao Qing (1947 film) =

1947 film directed by Sang Hu

- Film poster
- Directed by: Sang Hu
- Screenplay by: Eileen Chang
- Starring: Chen Yanyan; Liu Qiong; Lu Shan
- Cinematography: Xu Qi
- Production company: Wenhua Film Company
- Release date: 1947
- Country: China
- Language: Mandarin

Bu Liao Qing (Chinese: 不了情; lit. 'Unending Love') is a 1947 Chinese drama film. It is the first film collaboration between director Sang Hu and writer Eileen Chang (who was at the time one of the country's most popular writers).

== Plot ==
The film's plot is loosely modeled after Charlotte Brontë's Jane Eyre and is considered an example of a sentimental wenyi picture.

Love Everlasting (also known as Unending Love) is a 1947 Chinese film classic. Our story begins when Yu Jiayin, the main character and a very respectable young lady, moves to Shanghai after having been offered an in-house tutoring position for an eight-year-old girl named Tingting. This story takes a twist, however, when Jiayin falls in love with the girl's father, Xia Zongyu — a married man. Their romance blooms quickly, but as one thing leads to another, family expectations begin to interfere with their relationship. Jiayin's father comes into town and begins ruffling in some affairs, trying to exploit the situation for his own benefit. When Mr. Xia’s ailing wife returns, he struggles to cope with her and makes up his mind to divorce her, hoping for a future with Jiayin. After unexpected circumstances unfold, Jaiyin’s father takes it upon himself to suggest to Mrs. Xia that his daughter become a concubine, convincing her that it would benefit everyone in the situation. After this idea is suggested to Jiayin by Mrs. Xia, the unwell wife, Jaiyin leaves the conversation insulted and convinces herself it’s for the best that she leave Shanghai — setting aside her own desires to do what's best for Mr. Xia because she loves him.

== Cast ==
- Chen Yanyan as Yu Jiayin
- Liu Qiong as Xia Zongyu
- Lin Shen as Fan Xiujuan
- Cao Wei as Xia Zonglin
- Lu Shan as Mama Yeo
- Peng Peng as Xia Tingting
- Ye Ming as Chef
- Yan Su as Yu Jiayin’s father
- Sun Yi as Sub-Landlord
- Zhang Wan as Mrs. Xia

== Reception and Production ==
The movie — released by the prestigious Wenhua Film Company — was released to popular acclaim. Wenhua Film Company was a privately owned film studio founded in 1946 in Shanghai. Known for its creative and contemporary films, it played a key role in post-war Chinese cinema. The studio produced several other notable films, including Spring in a Small Town (1948) and a subsequent Sang Hu-Eileen Chang collaboration, Long Live the Missus! (1947).

== Historical background ==
Everlasting Love is the first time that the famous writer Eileen Chang had acted as a screenwriter for a movie. She incorporated her delicate portrayal of urban women's psychology into the script, showing the complex emotions of women in the conflict between traditional and modern values. After the release of the movie, Eileen Chang rewrote the script into a novel, How Much Hate, which further enriched the literary connotation of the story.

== Editing style ==
The film is black-and-white and filmed with a removable camera. However, match cut and shot-reverse are most used in this movie due to its chronological narrative style, transitioning from a medium shot to a close shot. Sang Hu’s film visualizes Jiayin’s inner conflict through superimposition. It shows her talking to a ghost-like version of herself. Eileen Chang changes this by making Jiayin talk to her reflection in the window, leaving out who’s speaking to make her inner struggle feel stronger in the novel adaption.
