= Cui Wei (actor) =

Chinese film director and actor (1912–1979)

- 崔嵬
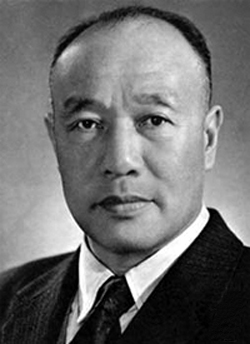
- Cui in 1962
- Born: Cui Jingwen; 14 October 1912; Zhucheng, Shandong Providence, China
- Died: 7 February 1979 (aged 66)

Cui Wei (Chinese: 崔嵬; pinyin: Cuī Wéi; 14 October 1912 – 7 February 1979), born Cui Jingwen (Chinese: 崔景文; pinyin: Cuī Jǐngwén), was a Chinese film director and actor. In 1962, Cui won the Hundred Flowers Award for Best Actor as Zhu Laogong in Keep Red Flag Flying (1960).

== Early life ==
Cui Jingwen was born on 14 October, 1912 into a poor peasant family. He started working at the age of twelve. Cui was able to attend a school in Qingdao due to the help of a relative but was expelled due to his Communist political activities.

In 1930, having briefly studied scriptwriting at Shandong Provincial Experimental Theatre, he organized the Seagull Theatrical Troupe and wrote stage play scripts. In 1932, he joined the League of Left-Wing Dramatists and traveled to the east and north of China, performing in leftist activities to promote patriontism against the Japanese invasion.

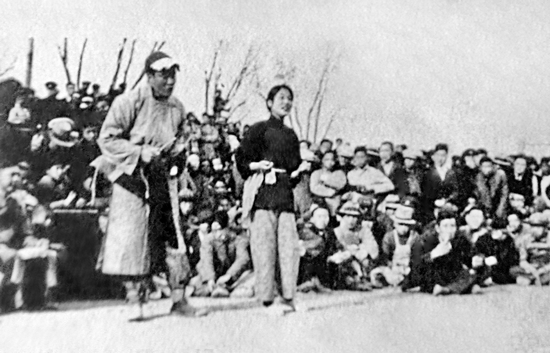
Cui (left) and Zhang Ruifang performing Lay Down Your Whip.

After studying theatre, Cui moved to Shanghai in 1935 and was a part of the leftist theatre movement. He adapted the play Lay Down Your Whip for street performances.

== Career ==
In 1938, Cui joined the Chinese Communist Party (CCP) and taught at the Lu Xun College of Arts in Yan'an. In 1949, he was appointed as director of the Cultural Bureau of the Central and South China District. He was also elected deputy of the Third National People's Congress, member of the 5th National Committee of the Chinese People's Political Consultive Conference, and the China Federation of Literature and Art Circles.

In 1954, Cui made his acting debut as the male lead in The Rebels (1955). In 1955, he quit his job at the CCP to join Beijing Film Studio and starred and multiple other films such as The Spirit of the Sea (1957), New Story of an Old Soldier (1959), and Keep Red Flag Flying (1960). For his performance in the latter, he won Best Actor at the 1st Hundred Flowers Awards.

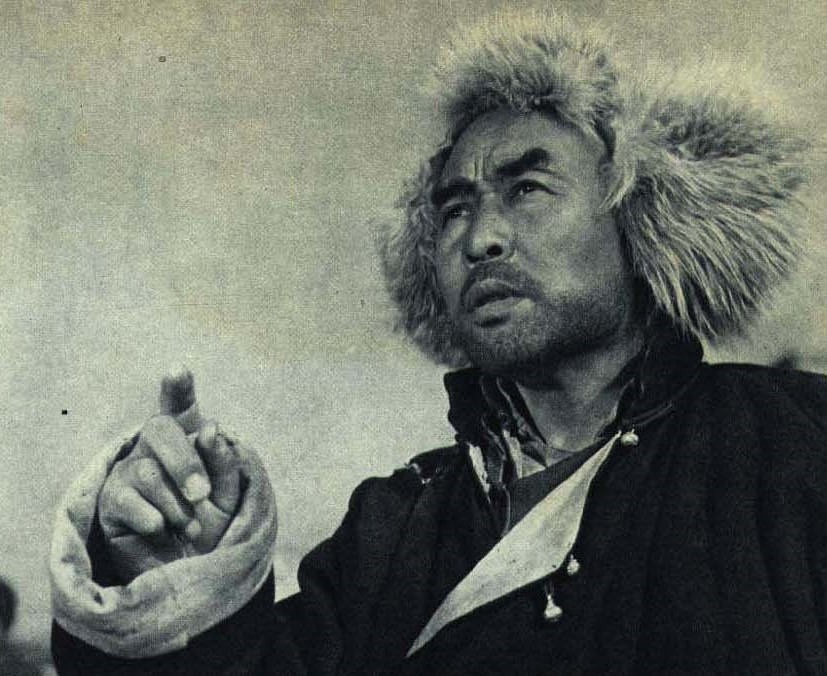
Cui as Zhu Laogong in Keep Red Flag Flying (1960).

He also directed and co-directed films such as Song of Youth (1959), an adaptation from Yang Mo's novel of the same name, Zhang Ga, a Boy Soldier (1963), a children's film, and Women Warriors of the Yang Family (1960), which was an adaptation of a traditional opera.

In 1966, Cui was repeatedly subjected to censorship and, in 1968, was imprisoned and sent to reform through labor. He was released in 1972.

== Death ==
Cui died on 7 February, 1979, of liver cancer.
