= River Without Buoys =

- Film poster
- Directed by: Wu Tianming
- Written by: Ye Weilin
- Produced by: Luo Xueying
- Starring: Li Wei; Tao Yuling; Hu Ronghua; Tang Qingming; Song Baosen
- Cinematography: Zhu Kongyang; Liu Changxu
- Edited by: Zhong Furong
- Music by: Xu Youfu
- Production company: Xi'an Film Studio
- Release date: 1983
- Running time: 100 minutes
- Country: China
- Language: Mandarin

River Without Buoys (Chinese: 没有航标的河流; pinyin: mei you hang biao de he liu) is a 1983 Chinese drama film directed by Wu Tianming about three timber rafters during the Cultural Revolution who decide to rescue a former District Director from a labor camp.

== Plot ==
Rafting down the Xiao River in Hunan, Pan Laowu (Li Wei) warns his fellow rafter Shi Gu (Hu Ronghua) not to take a wife, because "the wives of rafters are widows even while they live." Pan tells the story of a woman he loved, Wu Aihua (Tao Yuling), whom he never returned to after his raft broke up and he fell into debt. The third rafter, Zhao Liang, is revealed to have a large family (a wife and seven daughters). We learn that Shi Gu is upset because his intended, Gaixiu, has been forced to marry the son of a political leader.

During the night, Shi Gu leaves the raft after spotting a fire on shore. When Pan and Zhao find him, he has entered a labor camp and is nursing former district director Xu back to health. We learn that each of these men knew Xu before the cultural revolution as a good man, who worked and had fun with the people he led. They decide to take him with them, as he has obviously been sent to the camp to die. A short while later, they leave him with some hill folk, saying that they will return.

The next day, they spot a woman on a hill above the river, and Shi Gu recognizes her as Gaixiu, his beloved. He carries her from the shore to the raft, and they hide her from two men who are searching for her. She tells them that she has run away from her forced marriage, and Pan insists that she remain on the raft with them.

They arrive in a town, which we recognize as the town where Pan and Wu Aihua fell in love 30 years ago. Pan and Zhao go into town to buy supplies, leaving Shi Gu and Gaixiu concealed on the raft. Pan tells Zhao about seeing Wu Aihua after he did not return to her—he explains that she, too, knew District Director Xu and has a husband and child. Zhao says he should have talked to her and Pan explains that knowing that she was happy was enough for him. They purchase ginseng root at a high price to cure Xu, and learn that all shops will soon be closing because everyone must attend a patriotic opera. Pan goes into a restaurant and orders two bowls of noodles, but Zhao says he doesn't want any and prefers to save his money. As Pan is finishing the first bowl, a beggar approaches and asks for a mouthful of soup. Looking up, he recognizes her as Wu Aihua. She initially sits down, but then tearfully takes the soup and runs out of the restaurant. Pan follows her to the water's edge, where she had promised to wait for him, and she explains that her husband and son are dead, and she has nothing. Pan gives her the rest of his money and she tells him that he is a good man, and he asks her to take the ginseng to Xu. Zhao approaches and they return to the raft and Wu Aihua leaves.

Two party officials come to the raft and order them to attend the opera. When they begin to board the raft to see if anyone else is aboard, Pan calls for Shi Gu to come out to prevent them from searching the raft and finding Gaixiu. They notice that the police have arrested Wu Aihua, claiming she must have stolen the ginseng because she could not have afforded it, and the current Director confiscates it. After the opera, Zhao attacks him as he is walking along, but then runs away. Pan then knocks him down and takes the ginseng, and runs towards the raft. On the way, Wu Aihua accosts him and he surprises her with the ginseng, and tells her to go to Xu now. The police chase Pan to the raft, and the four of them push off and begin down the river, which has become swollen from rain. The raft has several narrow misses, but then as they approach a fallen tree Pan forces everyone else off the raft and attempts to steer around. We hear the cracking of timber and all goes dark.

In the morning, Gaixiu, Shi Gu, and Zhao are on the beach amongst washed-up logs from the raft, calling for Pan. A narrative comes in explaining that Pan is nowhere to be found, but perhaps he is just around the next bend of the river.

== Analysis ==
The "River Without Buoys" is a metaphor for the Chinese people after the Cultural Revolution—drifting aimlessly through life, with no higher purpose. The film itself is a criticism of the failure of the government to follow through on promises, and an existential meditation on what it means to live well in the absence of a guiding state.

Wu Tianming has said that this movie could not be made today—in addition to the increased censorship in China following the Tiananmen incidents of 1989, all of the major films in China go to "two and a half directors." He explains that while his film The King of Masks played for 11 weeks in the United States, the Chinese distributor decided that it would be released for only three days in theatres there.
