= Super, Girls! =

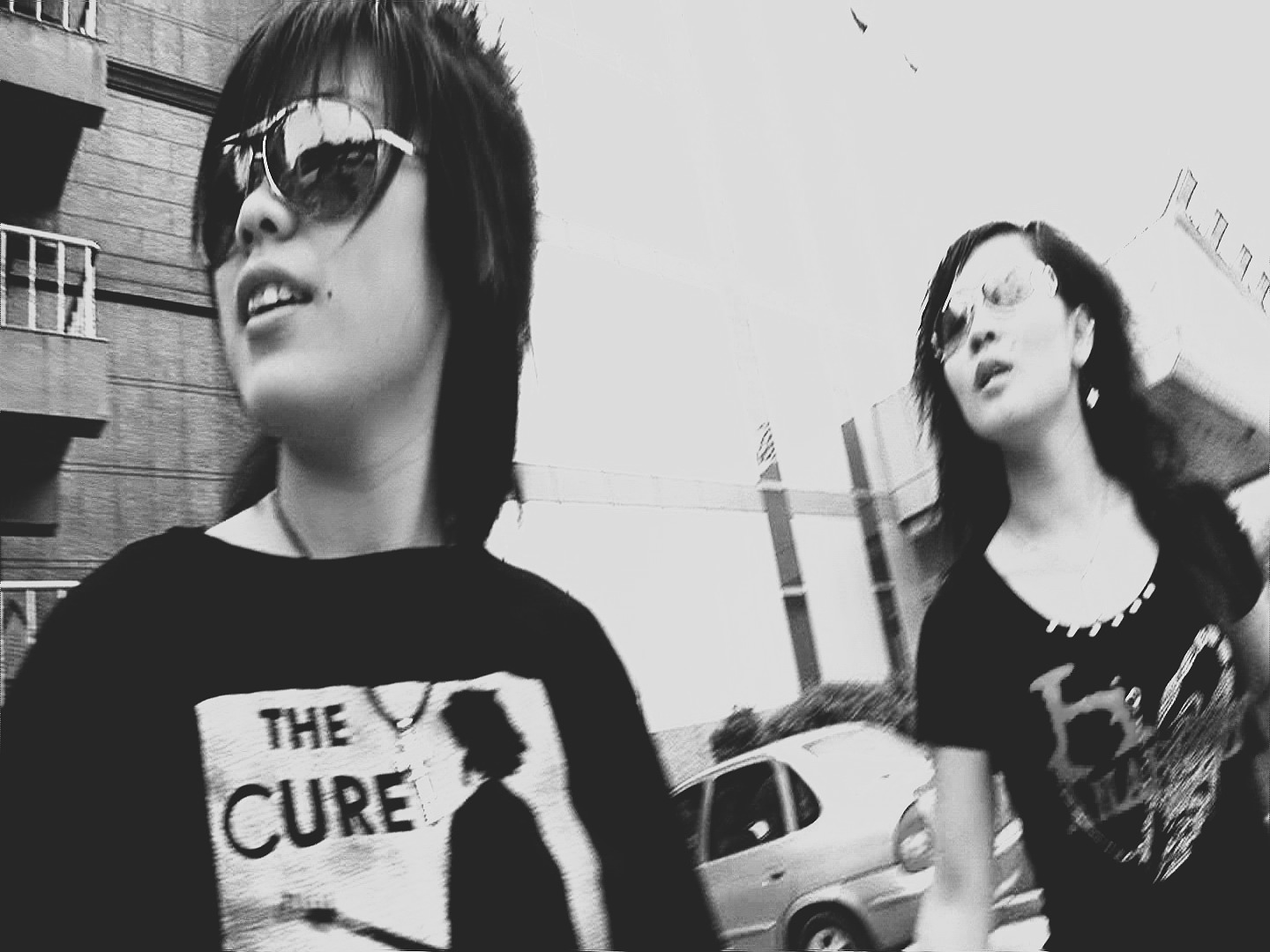
- Traditional Chinese: 超級女生
- Simplified Chinese: 超级女生
- Hanyu Pinyin: chāo jí nǚ shēng
- Directed by: Jian Yi
- Distributed by: dGenerate Films
- Release date: 2007
- Running time: 73 minutes
- Country: China
- Language: Mandarin

Super, Girls! (Chinese: 超级女生; pinyin: chāo jí nǚ shēng), directed by Jian Yi, is a 2007 independent Chinese documentary that follows 10 female teenagers on their quest to become instant superstars on China's biggest television show. The Chinese equivalent of American Idol, the "Super Girls Singing Contest" spawned an unprecedented pop culture phenomenon. Drawing over 400 million viewers, the ending text of the documentary implies the show was cancelled by the Chinese government for political reasons. The film assesses the contestants’ lives over several months. Through interviews and footage of auditions and competitions, Super, Girls! examines sexuality and success in the new China.

== Awards ==
- Official Selection - Cambridge Film Festival
- Official Selection - Minneapolis-St. Paul International Film Festival
- Documentary Fortnight, Museum of Modern Art, New York, March 2009
- Brooklyn Academy of Art, New York, April 2009
- Chinese Independent Film Festival, Kathmandu, Nepal, 2011
