= Ma Bo =

Chinese non-fiction writer (born 1947)

Ma Bo (马波）
- Born: August 22, 1947 (age 79); Hebei, China
- Education: Peking University; Brown University
- Occupation: Non-fiction writer
- Writing career
- Pen name: Old Ghost (老鬼)
- Period: 1988–present
- Genres: Cultural Revolution, Nonfiction

Ma Bo (born August 22, 1947) is a Chinese non-fiction writer who currently resides in Beijing, China. After graduating from Beijing University with a degree in journalism, he wrote and published the book Blood Red Sunset in 1988 which sold over 400,000 copies in China.

Subsequently, as a result of his participation in Tiananmen Square, he fled the country, first to France, and then ultimately to the US, where he settled as a resident scholar in Brown University's Literary Arts program.

In 1995, the English translation of Blood Red Sunset (Penguin, 1995) was published with Howard Goldblatt as translator. Also in 1995, Ma Bo's mother, Yang Mo, a prominent writer herself, was diagnosed with terminal cancer. Consequently, upon special permission from the Chinese government, Ma Bo returned to China to visit his mother in the hospital. He has remained in China since then.

== Bibliography ==
- Blood Red Sunset (血色黄昏) (1988, 1995)
- Blood and Iron (血与铁) (1998)
- My Mother, Yang Mo (我的母亲杨沫) (2005)
