= Shanghai Dramatic Arts Centre =

Chinese theatre company

- Type: Private
- Predecessor: Shanghai People's Art Theatre; Shanghai Youth Drama Troupe
- Founded: January 23, 1995; 31 years ago in Shanghai
- Headquarters: 288 Anfu Lu, near Wukang Lu, Xuhui District, Shanghai, China

Chinese name
- Traditional Chinese: 上海話劇藝術中心
- Simplified Chinese: 上海话剧艺术中心
Transcriptions
Standard Mandarin
- Hanyu Pinyin: Shànghǎi Huàjù Yìshù Zhōngxīn

Shanghai People's Art Theatre
- Traditional Chinese: 上海人民藝術劇院
- Simplified Chinese: 上海人民艺术剧院
Transcriptions
Standard Mandarin
- Hanyu Pinyin: Shànghǎi Rénmín Yìshù Jùyuàn

Second alternative Chinese name
- Traditional Chinese: 上海青年話劇團
- Simplified Chinese: 上海青年话剧团
Transcriptions
Standard Mandarin
- Hanyu Pinyin: Shànghǎi Qīngnián Huàjùtuán
- Website: www.china-drama.com

Shanghai Dramatic Arts Centre (Chinese: 上海话剧艺术中心; pinyin: Shànghǎi Huàjù Yìshù Zhōngxīn) is a professional theatrical company based in Shanghai, China, founded on January 23, 1995 after the merger of Shanghai's two largest theatres, the Shanghai People's Art Theatre (上海人民艺术剧院) and the Shanghai Youth Drama Troupe (上海青年话剧团). Its founders are Xia Yan, Huang Zuolin and Xiong Foxi. Currently, its contracted actors include Michael Chen, Ryan Cheng, Xu Zheng and Ma Yili.
