= Tai tai =

Chinese term for some women

- Also spelled taitai, tai-tai, or taai taai.
- Chinese: 太太
Transcriptions
Standard Mandarin
- Hanyu Pinyin: Tàitài
Yue: Cantonese
- Yale Romanization: Taaitáai
- Jyutping: Taai3taai2

Tai tai (太太) is a Chinese colloquial term for an elected leader-wife; or a wealthy married woman who does not work. It is the same as the Cantonese title for a married woman. It has the same euphemistic value as "lady" in English: sometimes flattery, sometimes subtle insult. One author describes it as equivalent to the English term "ladies who lunch".

== Cultural significance ==
By the time of the May Fourth Movement in 1919, the term had come to imply a wife who was "dependent on her newly rising bourgeois husband" for her consumerist lifestyle, and Chinese feminists and "new women" of that era tried to disassociate themselves from the term precisely for that reason.

The term has become well-known, and features in Western discussions in the field of Women's studies. Pearl Buck uses the term to describe Madame Liang in her novel, Three Daughters of Madame Liang.

The 1947 film Long Live the Missus! (Taitai wansui), written by Eileen Chang and directed by Sang Hu, represents conflicts between taitai in the mode of a comedy of manners.
