= Lü Ban =

Chinese actor, comedian and film director

Lü Ban (Chinese: 吕班; 1913–1976), born Hao Enxing (Chinese: 郝恩星), was a Chinese actor, comedian and film director, and a member of the Chinese Communist Party. He was the author of the first Chinese satirical comedy film in 1956. His career ended a year later when he was banned from film-making for The Unfinished Comedy, another satirical comedy, itself banned before its release and described both as notorious and "perhaps the most accomplished [Chinese] film made in the 17 years between 1949 and the Cultural Revolution".

== Biography ==
Lü Ban studied in the Film Actor Training School of the United Photoplay Service, and subsequently worked as an actor and a comedian in leftist theater and cinema in Shanghai in the 1930s. He made his debut as an actor in Crossroads (Shizi jietou, 1937). He quickly gained fame, and has been even called "the Oriental Chaplin".

In 1948 he joined the Northeast Film Studio and the following year he was involved in the production of Bridge, the first feature film of the post-war, communist China. His first films were revolutionary melodramas: in 1950 he co-directed with Yi Lin the Heroes of Lüliang Mountain (Lüliang yingxiong, 1950); in 1951, with Shi Dongshan, New Heroes and Heroines (Xin ernü yingxiong zhuan); 1952 he directed Gate No. 6 (Liu hao men); in 1954, A Heroic Driver (Yingxiong siji), and in 1955 a musical, Chorus of the Yellow (Huangheda hechang).

However, his most influential and discussed works were the three satirical comedies released during the period of lessened censorship in 1956–57 (known as the Hundred Flowers Campaign). Those three comedies have been described as some of the sharpest criticisms, at least in the film media of that period, of the contemporary Chinese society. One of the distinguishing feature of his movies of that period was the novelty or using fellow, socialist Chinese citizens as the subjects of satire, instead of the previously common, and safer, "corrupt GMD officials and snobbish urban socialites." The works released during that brief period departed from the state-sanctioned topics aiming to legitimize the new state, offering "moral edification and celebrating the triumph of revolutionary virtue over reactionary villainy".

The Man Who Doesn't Bother about Trifles (Buju xiaojie de ren, 1956) was the least controversial of the trio, likely due to "its trivial subject matter and mild satirical style". However, Lü Ban's other two movies proved to be much more problematic. Before the New Director Arrives (Xin ju zhang dao lai zhi qian, 1956), described as "the first satirical film to be made in the PRC", made fun of inefficient low ranking officials and exposed the hierarchical relationships occurring between the cadres, but led to Lü Ban being accused of "attacking the Party", while his next film, The Unfinished Comedy (Meiyou wancheng de xiju, 1957), critically dealing among others with the sensitive topic of film censorship, and since described as notorious, was labelled as a "poisonous weed" during the Anti-Rightist Movement and banned before its release. Lü Ban was accused of "mocking new persons and new things in a new Chinese society in the name of comedy" and in general, undermining socialist morality and attacking the Party. The Unfinished Comedy ended Lü Ban's career as shortly afterward, Lü Ban himself was banned from directing for life and sentenced to internal exile; he had to abandon work on film-making, leaving behind several unfinished projects, and died in 1976 without being allowed to work on another film.

Lü Ban's fate was one of the reasons for other Chinese film makers putting more effort into self-censorship and abandoning the genre of satirical comedy (the next one would not appear in Chinese theaters until the mid-80s); for years to come, the dominant model of comedy in China became one that avoided conflict, and presented safe stories involving "model socialist citizens" learning how to better live in the "harmonious socialist society".

== See also ==
- Film censorship in China
