= The Joys and Sorrows of Middle Age =

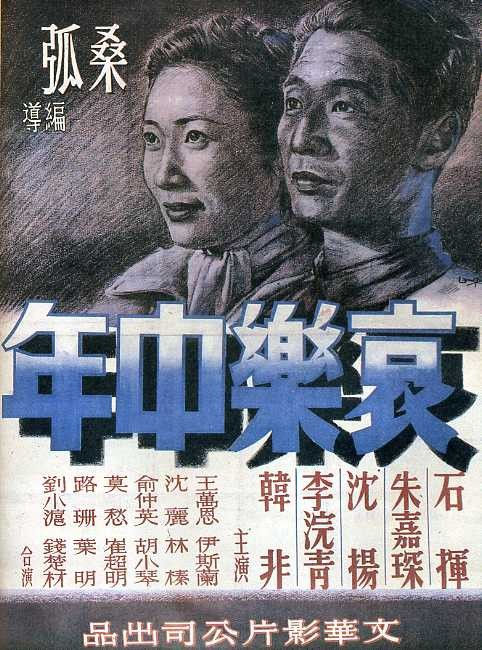
- Film poster
- Directed by: Sang Hu
- Written by: Eileen Chang
- Produced by: Fei Han
- Starring: Shi Hui; Zhu Jiachen; Han Fei; Li Huanqing
- Cinematography: Huang Shaofen
- Edited by: Xu Qi
- Music by: Huang Yijun
- Production company: Wenhua Film Company
- Release date: 1949
- Running time: 103 min.
- Country: China
- Language: Mandarin

The Joys and Sorrows of Middle Age (Chinese: 哀樂中年; pinyin: Aī lè zhōngnián; lit. 'Sorrows [and] Joys [of] Middle Age') is a 1949 Chinese film directed by Sang Hu (桑弧). The screenplay was written by Eileen Chang, and the film was produced by the Wenhua Film Company. It has appeared in several polls of the top Chinese films of all time, showing up at 71st in the Hong Kong Film Awards poll of 2013, and at 55th in the Time Out Beijing poll of 2014.

== Synopsis ==
The film is a romantic comedy-drama whose protagonist is Chen Shaochang (Shi Hui), a widowed schoolmaster with three children. The film opens with Shaochang leading his three children to the cemetery for Tomb-Sweeping Day. Superimposed over them is a paraphrase of two lines from a Tang dynasty poem: "Just as Heaven loves to hide its intentions in the dark grasses / So does love between people only become clear when it is late." The children hastily pay their respects at their mother's grave and then ask to be allowed to go and play. As Chen stays behind to weed the grave, he overhears a young girl crying inconsolably. The girl is Liu Minhua (about seven years old), who is visiting her mother's grave with her father. Minhua's father sternly tells her to stop crying, but Shaochang comforts her. It turns out that Minhua's father and Shaochang are old friends. Minhua's father says that he is dissatisfied with the school his daughter is attending, and that he plans to send her to Shaochang's school. Shaochang agrees and asks how Minhua's stepmother treats her. Minhua's father confesses that she has been cruel to Minhua since they had a new child together.

When Minhua arrives at Shaochang's school on the first day of class, he is giving an address to the students. He tells the story of how there were only twelve students in the school when he first opened it more than a decade ago, but now there are hundreds, and the school has a good reputation in the community.

We cut to years later, when Shaochang's eldest son, Chen Jianzhong (Han Fei), is working at a bank. The bank manager asks Jianzhong to tutor his daughter. Jianzhong's friends tell him that this is his chance to start a relationship with her and advance his career. Back at the school, Liu Minhua (Zhu Jiachen), who is now a young lady, comes to ask Shaochang for a job as a teacher. Shaochang senses that something is wrong and asks how things are with Minhua's stepmother. Minhua confesses that, since her father died, her stepmother has been even more cruel to her, and wants her to marry a man in his 60s. After confronting Minhua's stepmother, Shaochang gives Minhua a job as a teacher and lets her live in the teachers' dormitory. She immediately earns the respect of her colleagues as a diligent worker.

Chen Jianzhong marries Feng Lijun (Li Huanqing), the eldest daughter of the bank manager. Jianzhong's career takes off: he moves into a mansion and begins to associate with other wealthy people. He and Lijun are embarrassed that Shaochang still works, so they pressure him to retire. At his retirement ceremony, he repeats the story of how the school only had twelve students when he started, but now has hundreds. Minhua takes over as schoolmistress. However, Shaochang quickly becomes bored with retirement. The next Tomb-Sweeping Day, Shaochang runs into Minhua at the cemetery. Shaochang complains that his family treats him as old, and has already bought him a tomb. Minhua tells him that, "Nowadays, we Chinese think that after youth there is only old age. There is no middle age. In reality, middle age is the most valuable time." With Minhua's encouragement, Shaochang returns to teaching, over the strong objections of Jianzhong.

One of the teachers at the school asks Shaochang to act as a go-between in proposing to Minhua. Shaochang agrees, but when he encourages Minhua to marry the other man, she breaks down in tears. Shaochang asks her what is wrong, and she confesses that she wants to marry Shaochang. He protests that he is too old and that she would just be marrying him out of pity, but Minhua convinces him that she is sincere, and they agree to marry. When Shaochang tells his family the news, Jianzhong and Lijun lead the other family members in opposing the marriage. They refuse to attend the wedding and tell Shaochang that they will not let them live with them. Furthermore, Lijun will use her influence with her father (who has become a trustee of the school) to have Minhua fired.

Shaochang is saddened, but Minhua tells him that they can start a new school, just like he did years ago. On a school field trip, they discover the plot that Shaochang's family had bought him for his tomb. Since it legally belongs to Shaochang, he repurposes it as a school. We cut ahead to the first day of classes. Shaochang is about to address the students when he hears a baby crying and excuses himself. Minhua is in bed with their recently born child. Smiling, she says that they are fine and he should go back to class. Shaochang returns to the class and again tells the story of how there were only twelve students in the first class of his previous school. He quickly counts the students in the current classroom and discovers that it is twelve. As the shot pulls away, Shaochang is telling the students that he is sure this school, too, will someday have hundreds of students.

== Cast ==
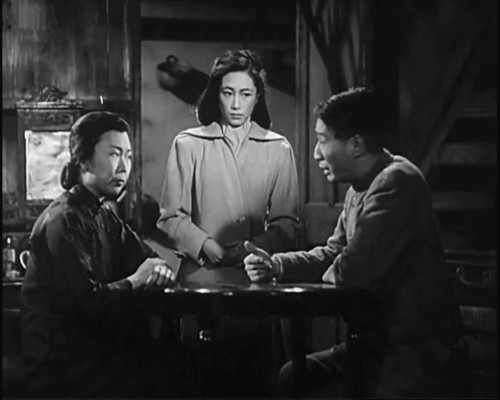
Lu Shan as Mrs. Liu, Zhu Jiachen as Liu Minhua, and Shi Hui as Chen Shaochang.

- Shi Hui 石揮 as Chen Shaochang 陳紹常, a widowed schoolmaster
- Zhu Jiachen 朱嘉琛 as Liu Minhua 劉敏華, the daughter of the schoolmaster's best friend
- Han Fei 韓非 as Chen Jianzhong 陳 建中, the schoolmaster's eldest son
- Li Huanqing 李浣晴 as Feng Lijun 馮麗君, the wife of Chen Jianzhong

== Reputation ==
The film's star is Shi Hui, who is one of the most highly regarded actors and directors of the "Second Golden Age" of Chinese Cinema of the 1940s and 1950s. Although the screenplay is sometimes credited to Sang Hu, it seems likely that it was actually written by Eileen Chang. Chang is considered one of the leading writers of twentieth-century China. Some aspects of the character "Minhua" parallel Chang's own life. Like "Minhua," Chang had a strained relationship with her stepmother, and like "Minhua" she married a man significantly older than herself.

== DVD releases ==
This film is not currently available on DVD, but is in the public domain and can be downloaded for free from multiple online sites.

== See also ==
- 沈鬱淡雅的人間況味--《哀樂中年》
- List of films in the public domain in the United States
