= Shi Hui (actor) =

Chinese actor and film director

- Born: Shi Yutao; 1915; Tianjin, China
- Died: December 1957 (aged 42); Shanghai, China
- Occupations: Film director, Actor
- Years active: 1940s–1950s

Chinese name
- Traditional Chinese: 石揮
- Simplified Chinese: 石挥
Transcriptions
Standard Mandarin
- Hanyu Pinyin: Shí Huī

Shi Hui (1915 – December 1957), born Shi Yutao (Chinese: 石毓涛), was a Chinese actor and film director who gained prominence throughout the 1940s through 1950s. Despite his fame, Shi became a victim of the Anti-Rightist Movement in the mid-1950s and committed suicide soon thereafter.

== Career ==
Shi's career as an actor began relatively late. His first film was not until 1940's The Chaotic World (dir. Wu Renzhi), and he would not gain broad recognition until after the war, with a series of classic films including Phony Phoenixes (dir. Huang Zuolin) and Long Live the Missus! (dir. Sang Hu). He also played the lead in Ai le zhongnian (The Joys and Sorrows of Middle Age), which is often ranked as one of the greatest Chinese films of all time.

After the Communist takeover, Shi became increasingly involved with the making of films behind the camera, directing himself in the classic This Life of Mine. Shi continued to direct throughout the early years of the 1950s, even gaining international attention with 1954's Letter with Feather, which won a prize at the Edinburgh Film Festival. The next year, he filmed a stage performance of a Chinese Opera in The Heavenly Match, which became a popular hit with audiences in Hong Kong. Shortly thereafter, however, Shi ran afoul with Communist authorities and was denounced during the Anti-Rightist Movement as a reactionary, leading eventually to his suicide by drowning in December 1957.

== Filmography ==
=== As director ===
Year	English Title	Chinese Title	Notes
1949	Mother	母亲	Also wrote screenplay
1950	This Life of Mine	我這一輩子	
1951	Platoon Commander Guan	關連長	
1954	Letter with Feather	雞毛信	
1955	The Heavenly Match	天仙配	

=== As actor ===
Year	English Title	Chinese Title	Role
1941	The Chaotic World	亂世風光	
1946	Phony Phoenixes	假鳳虚凰	
1947	Long Live the Missus!	太太萬歲	
1947	Night Inn	夜店	
1949	Ai le zhongnian (Sorrows and Joys of Middle Age)	哀樂中年	Chen Shaochang
1950	This Life of Mine	我這一輩子	
1950	Corruption	腐蝕	
1951	Platoon Commander Guan	關連長	Guan
1955	Song Jingshi	宋景詩	
1957	Loyal Partners	情長誼深	
