= Wu Tianming =

Chinese film director and producer

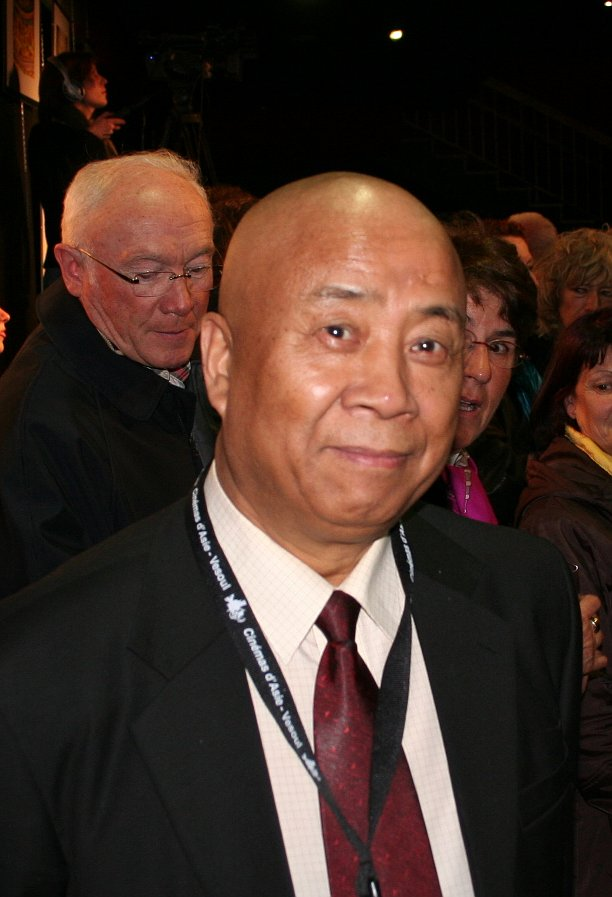
- Born: December 5, 1939; Sanyuan County, Shaanxi
- Died: March 4, 2014 (aged 74); Beijing, China
- Occupations: Film director Film producer
- Awards: Hawaii Best Feature Film; 1984 River Without Buoys; Tokyo Grand Prix; 1988 Old Well; Tokyo Best Director Award; 1996 King of MasksGolden Rooster Awards – Best Picture; 1988 Old Well; Best Director; 1988 Old Well; 1996 King of Masks; Special Jury Award; 2013 Song of the Phoenix

Chinese name
- Traditional Chinese: 吳天明
- Simplified Chinese: 吴天明
Transcriptions
Standard Mandarin
- Hanyu Pinyin: Wú Tiānmíng

Wu Tianming (simplified Chinese: 吴天明; traditional Chinese: 吳天明; pinyin: Wú Tiānmíng; December 5, 1939 – March 4, 2014) was a Chinese film director and producer who was considered one of the leading "Fourth Generation" directors. He is best known for his film The King of Masks (1995).

== Biography ==
Wu was born in Sanyuan County, Shaanxi Province, China on December 5, 1939. In 1960, aged twenty, he was accepted into a training class for film acting run by the Xi’an Film Studio. There were sixteen state-run studios in China at that time, and this was the closest to his home in Sanyuan, Shaanxi Province. He was put on the studio's payroll and had some bit-parts in the studio's productions of the early 1960s. In 1966, Mao's Cultural Revolution stopped productions in the studios. In 1974–1976, the last three years of the Cultural Revolution, Wu studied at the partly re-opened Beijing Film Academy, majoring in Film Directing.

In 1982, Wu co-directed two features at Xi’an with his friend Teng Wenji. Afterwards Wu made his debut as a solo director with River Without Buoys, whose commercial success led to Wu Tianming's appointment as head of the Xi'an Film Studio in 1983. Wu was the youngest studio head in the PRC at 45 years old In 1984, Wu directed his movie Life (1984), attacking what he defined as the three main problems in Chinese society: having to accept assigned posts rather than choose one's own employment, the practices of nepotism and favoritism, and “unhealthy tendencies in the Party.” With his film Life, Wu began a policy of producing movies with deep roots in the regions around Xi’an. Wu insisted on producing a number of experimental films, called "tansuo pian" to raise aesthetic and conceptual standards in China without regard to their commercial performance. Among these films were Tian Zhuangzhuang's The Horse Thief (Daoma Zei, 1986), shot in Tibet and Gansu, and Chen Kaige's King of the Children (Haizi Wang, 1987), shot in Yunnan.

By employing what became known as "Fifth Generation" directors like Tian and Chen and allowing them to make non-commercial films, Wu found himself in conflict with Wu Yigong at the Shanghai Film Studio, who regularly spoke out against “elitist” films which the mass audience couldn't understand or relate to. Wu Tianming prevailed due to his commercial success and the international acclaim the tansuo pian films garnered at international film festivals. In 1987, Wu made a deal with the cinematographer of his film, Zhang Yimou. Wu would give Zhang his directorial debut with Red Sorghum in return for Zhang starring in Wu's film Old Well and supervising the cinematography. Both movies were highly successful in the China market and achieved considerable international success.

When the head of Shaanxi Propaganda Bureau criticized Wu Tianming's policies, he fought back by publicly denouncing him as “a bureaucrat who doesn’t understand films but wants to control filmmaking.” At Xi'an Studio he nurtured prominent "Fifth Generation" directors Zhang Yimou and Chen Kaige. Wu came to the United States in 1989 as a visiting scholar at NYU and decided not to return to China in the wake of the events at Tiananmen Square. After several years of operating a video rental store in California, Wu returned to China in 1994 to direct the Shaw Brothers produced film The King of Masks in 1995, which was internationally acclaimed. Wu's film An Unusual Love Story (Feichang Aiqing, 1998) was made in 1998. In 2012, Wu returned to his origins as an actor when he starred in the 2012 film Full Circle. Wu's final film, The Song of the Phoenix was completed in 2013, but was not released in China until May 6, 2016, more than two years after his death.

Wu Tianming died on March 4, 2014, from a heart attack, at the age of 74.

== Filmography ==
=== As director ===
Year	English Title	Chinese Title	Notes
1979	Reverberations of Life	生活的颤音	
1980	Kith and Kin	亲缘	
1983	River Without Buoys	没有航标的河流	
1984	Life	人生	
1986	Old Well	老井	1988 Golden Rooster for Best Director
1996	The King of Masks	变脸	1996 Golden Rooster for Best Director
1998	An Unusual Love	世界	
2002	C.E.O.		
2013	Song of the Phoenix	百鸟朝凤	

=== As producer ===
Year	English Title	Chinese Title	Director	Notes
1985	The Black Cannon Incident	黑炮事件	Huang Jianxin	
1986	The Horse Thief	盗马贼	Tian Zhuangzhuang	
1987	Red Sorghum	紅高梁	Zhang Yimou	1988 Golden Rooster for Best Picture (shared with Wu's own Old Well)
2007	Mr. Cinema	老港正传	Samson Chiu	
