= Ke Ling =

Chinese journalist, publicist and writer (1909–2000)

Ke Ling (柯灵; 1909 – 19 June 2000) was a Chinese journalist, publicist and writer. He is best known for his involvement with the Leftist newspaper Wenhui Bao, founded in February 1938.

== Early life ==
Ke Ling was born in the market town of Doumen in Yuecheng District, Shaoxing, Zhejiang, and grew up in Guangzhou. Primarily self-taught, in 1924 he became a teacher in an elementary school, and in 1928 he was the principal of an elementary school in Xunyang.

In 1926, he published his first work in the Commercial Press's Women's Magazine (妇女杂志) (1915-1932) of Shanghai. In 1931, he moved to Shanghai, where, beginning in 1932, he participated in the left-wing film movement and became a member of the Left-wing Drama Federation's {左翼剧联} Film Critic Group (影評小組). In 1933, he assumed the job as the public relations director of Mingxing.
