= The Unfinished Comedy =

1957 film by Lü Ban

- Traditional Chinese: 沒有完成的喜劇
- Simplified Chinese: 没有完成的喜剧
- Hanyu Pinyin: méiyǒu wánchéng de xǐjù
- Directed by: Lü Ban
- Screenplay by: Lü Ban; Luo Tai
- Starring: Han Langen; Yin Xiucen; Fang Hua; Su Manyi; Chen Zhong; Ning Xiping; Zhang Qinzhen; Bai Mei; Yan Huang; Wu Yumei; Ma Yuling
- Cinematography: Wei Xu
- Music by: Ma Lin
- Production company: Changchun Film Studio
- Release date: 1957
- Running time: 89 minutes
- Country: China
- Languages: Mandarin; Subtitles created by Liu Yuqing; English subtitles translated by Christopher Rea

The Unfinished Comedy (Chinese: 没有完成的喜剧, Méiyǒu wánchéng de xǐjù) is a 1957 Chinese sound film directed by actor-turned-director Lü Ban. The film portrays the reunion of a beloved Republican-era screen comedic duo, "Skinny Monkey" Hán Lángēn and "Fatty" Yīn Xiùcén, who are finally able to produce comedy shorts again at the invitation of the Changchun Film Studio. The duo's first three films, which satirize present-day China's censorship, are screened and critiqued by Comrade Yi Bangzi, or "Comrade Bludgeon," (whose name is a homophone of the popular expression "(to kill with) a bludgeon)", acting as the censor who will decide whether the results of their filmmaking will become "flowers of comedy" or just "a clump of weeds."

This notorious metacinematic satirical comedy, made during the Hundred Flowers Campaign (May 1956–June 1957), has been described as "perhaps the most accomplished [Chinese] film made in the 17 years between 1949 and the Cultural Revolution". It addresses sensitive issues of "social criticism, the relationship between mass culture and political discourse, the conflict between artistic autonomy and official control, and the status of artists and performers from the "old society."" The film dramatized the way in which the People's Republic of China constrained film artists through three film-within-a-film shots and ends with the censor, Comrade Bludgeon, stumbling around backstage before being struck on the head with a loose beam. He is literally "killed with one bludgeon," living up to his name.

Comrade Bludgeon makes his exit backstage and is struck by a bludgeon.

Due to its controversial subject matter, the movie was received very poorly by the censor critics, who considered it too objectionable, and it was subsequently not shown to a wider public. This led to Lü Ban's becoming the target of political persecution during the Anti-Rightist Campaign (1957–1959) and being banned from future filmmaking until his death two decades later. The film was belatedly released in the 1980s.

== Plot ==
The Unfinished Comedy centers around three comedies that are in the censorship stage. All three comedies are the work of the same directors and actors and are being performed for a group of Communist Party officials, including critic censor Yi Bangzi.

The first film the comedians present is about Manager Hogg, who is portrayed as someone who greatly enjoys a lavish lifestyle. His assistant organizes a luxurious banquet at his request, but Hogg remains excessively critical, repeatedly complaining about his assistant being too stingy. This assistant, always eager to please his boss, readily agrees to every criticism. Later, seeking to improve his health, Hogg decides to attend a health farm to lose weight. On the journey, he loses his wallet, leading to confusion when another passenger picks it up but, startled by train police, accidentally falls from the train, dying in an accident. Since the deceased passenger had Manager Hogg's wallet, authorities mistakenly identify the victim as Hogg, promptly informing his company of his "death." When Hogg, unable to bear the strict lifestyle of the health farm, returns home unexpectedly, he ironically finds himself attending his own funeral. Rather than feeling upset or surprised, he humorously complains about the inadequate size of the floral tributes from his acquaintances. When he discovers that his position at the company has already been reassigned due to his supposed death, Hogg dramatically asserts that he is alive, comically highlighting human vanity, absurdity, and the dysfunctions of bureaucratic processes.

In the second film, Monkey is an individual who habitually exaggerates his accomplishments. At a banquet, attempting to impress a woman, Monkey falsely claims that he and his companion Fatty were once renowned professional dancers, so talented that people would pay generously just to see them perform. Intrigued, the lady invites them to demonstrate their skills, forcing the duo into an awkward, inept performance that thoroughly embarrasses them. Later, the same woman invites them to go diving, and Monkey once again boasts inaccurately about being professional divers. Anticipating further embarrassment, Fatty hastily covers Monkey's mouth, humorously illustrating the folly and embarrassment resulting from exaggerated claims and social pretensions.

The third film is about three siblings who eagerly await their mother's arrival from the countryside, initially competing over whose home she should stay at, as they all appear eager to host her. However, upon seeing their elderly mother's frail appearance, the two elder brothers abruptly lose interest since their real intention was to exploit her as a nanny. The youngest daughter, despite being the least financially secure, remains genuinely caring and welcoming. Initially, the mother visits her eldest son's home, where she is mistreated, given minimal food, and burdened with childcare duties. Deeply hurt, she moves to her second son's home, where she faces similar treatment—expected to perform exhausting chores and endure neglect. Frustrated by their harsh behavior, she finally moves to her daughter's humble home, where she is warmly welcomed with genuine love and new clothing handmade by her son-in-law. Mistakenly believing their mother has been rewarded handsomely for donating an antique vase to a museum, the two elder brothers suddenly rush to reconcile, driven by greed. However, the supposed reward turns out to be false, and in their fight over the vase, it accidentally breaks, highlighting the superficiality, greed, and insincerity within family dynamics driven by material interests.

The censor thought the third film didn't show a grand enough story to be worthwhile, and all three films were rejected. The members of the audience then began to laugh at the censor's grandiose posturing about comedy, and he angrily leaves. When he is backstage, he accidentally walks into a column which causes a supporting beam to fall onto his head.

== Cast ==
Cast members include:

- Han Langen, as himself, comedian 1
- Yin Xiucen, as himself, comedian 2
- Fang Hua as Comrade Yi Bangzi (易浜子), the censor/critic
- Su Manyi (苏曼意) as Lanyan (兰燕)
- Chen Zhong
- Yan Jie (闫杰) as fat traveler
- Wu Yumei 武豫梅 as the announcer and nurse
- Ning Xiping 宁喜萍 as the two brothers' mother
- Zhang Qinzhen 张勤箴 as the little sister
- Bai Mei 白玫 as the elder brother's wife
- Yan Huang 严皇 as younger brother's wife
- Ma Yuling 马玉玲 as the journalist
- Luo Tai 罗泰 as director Li
- Du Fengxia 杜凤霞 as student 1
- Lan Lan 蓝兰 as student 2
- Lu Min 卢敏 as student 3
- Gao Ping 高平 as the guard
- Hou Jianfu 侯建夫 as the actor

== Cinematic techniques ==
=== Scene setting ===
The scene setting adds to the layer of absurdity and bureaucracy that the film is trying to portray.

At around 34:40 minutes into the film, the officials are seen reviewing the movie within the great hall; the director uses a wide-angle shot to emphasize the grandeur and magnitude of the great hall, which is extremely spacious and well-built. Compared to the vastness of the great hall, there are only a few members presented, highlighting the absurdity of the bureaucratic process, "strong" in appearances but "weak" in actual impact or importance.

The director also uses a high-angle shot further to underscore the perceived power structure within the great hall. With the most important members sitting leisurely in the front, and all other members lined up neatly behind them, it further emphasizes a rigid system that follows its own set of rules and regulations.

The changes in seating arrangement indicate a further discrepancy between ranks. The sofas in the front row, where all the officials sit are quite comfortable and spacious while the chairs in the back seem rather stark and dark. This perceived inequality and imbalance shows a degree of satire in a socialist society.

==== Costume ====
A key component of mise-en-scene that further constructs the theme of bureaucracy absurdity through satire is Yi Bang Zi.

At the beginning of the film, the audience is quickly introduced to Yi Bang Zi, the official art critic. He wears an ill-fitted, traditional outfit, with ridiculous glasses and haircut. The exaggeration portrays a level of restrictiveness and an almost impersonal nature of bureaucracy. The director uses Yi to poke fun at the "system", to "test the permissibility of laughter in a socialist society".

== Production ==
Satirical comedies began as early as the late 1920s and early 1930s, However, comedy was marginalized and undeveloped as a genre between 1949 and 1955. Social satires only saw a large surge in production during the Hundred Flowers campaign. The movie was directed by Lü Ban of the Changchun Film Studio during this period of lessened censorship in 1956–57 (known as the Hundred Flowers Campaign). Following the Communist Party's encouragement of criticism and greater creative freedoms, Lü Ban used the opportunity to promote his agenda of using comedy to provide entertainment as well as social intervention. After receiving positive reviews on his first two comedic short comedies, Lü Ban approached his third comedic feature with greater audacity.

The comedic style presented in The Unfinished Comedy is deeply influenced by Soviet comedic cinema of the 1950s, reflecting broader patterns of cultural exchange between China and the Soviet Union during the early People's Republic of China (PRC). Due to strict cultural policies and centralized film management, Chinese filmmakers faced significant restrictions. However, they found inspiration and guidance from Soviet satirical comedies widely promoted across China at the time. Films such as Did We Meet Somewhere Before? became notably popular and well-received, significantly shaping the humor and narrative style employed by Chinese directors like Lü Ban. The Soviet comedic approach, characterized by humorous yet sharp critiques of bureaucracy, inefficiency, and hypocrisy, provided a valuable blueprint for Chinese films. Lü Ban's satirical methods in The Unfinished Comedy directly reflected these influences, using laughter and satire to subtly critique Chinese society while carefully navigating political constraints and expectations. Consequently, the comedic narratives in The Unfinished Comedy not only encapsulate unique local social realities but also demonstrate the broader socialist comedic traditions borrowed from Soviet cinema.

== Reception ==
During the Anti-Rightist Movement, a backlash against the liberal Hundred Flowers Campaigns, the movie was subject to harsh criticism. The movie has been widely criticized for Chinese censors for excessive slapstick and "taking the satirical license too far". The movie subject matter was too controversial for its time, as it touched upon a sensitive topic of film censorship and its portrayal of the "humorless party official", a film censor nicknamed "The Bludgeon", and the main object of ridicule in the film, has been described as unflattering. The censor is alleged to be blind, uninterested in either watching or discussing the movie, yet drunk on his power related to deciding whether the movie will be allowed to be screened or not. Its criticism of the censor official was interpreted as too close to the criticism of the Communist Party itself, as after all it was the Party that argued for the necessity of censorship. It headed the list of problematic movies, the so-called "poisonous weeds" list, and was banned before its release. Chen Huangmei, an important Party official described as "film czar", lambasted the movie in an editorial in People's Daily, as "thoroughly anti-Party, antisocialist, and tasteless". The movie and Lü Ban became subject to a number of highly critical articles in Chinese press.

The Unfinished Comedy ended Lü Ban's career as shortly afterward, Lü Ban himself was banned from directing for life and sentenced to internal exile; he had to abandon work on film-making, leaving behind several unfinished projects, and died in 1976 without being allowed to work on another film.

The disastrous reception of the movie by the film censors was one of the reasons for other Chinese filmmakers putting more effort into self-censorship and abandoning the genre of satirical comedy (the next one would not appear in Chinese theaters until mid-80s); for years to come, the dominant model of comedy in China became one that avoided conflict, and presented safe stories involving model socialist citizens learning how to better live in the harmonious socialist society.

The reception of the movie abroad has been significantly better. Paul Clark in his book on Chinese Cinema described it as "perhaps the most accomplished [Chinese] film made in the 17 years between 1949 and the Cultural Revolution".
