= Hu Ronghua =

Chinese xiangqi grandmaster (born 1945)

Personal information
- Born: November 14, 1945 (age 80) Shanghai, China

Sport
- Country: China
- Sport: Xiangqi
- Rank: Grandmaster (1982)

Achievements and titles
- Highest world ranking: No. 4 (January 2001)
- Personal best: 2586 (July 2001, rating)

Hu Ronghua (Chinese: 胡荣华; pinyin: Hú Rónghuá, born November 14, 1945) is a Chinese xiangqi grandmaster. Hu Ronghua has been referred to as the Bobby Fischer of xiangqi. Due to his excellent xiangqi skills, he was given the title of "一代宗师" (Top Grandmaster Ever) and was nicknamed "胡司令" (Top Commander Hu).

== Xiangqi career ==
Hu Ronghua first won the Chinese National Xiangqi Championship in 1960, at age 15, the youngest record ever. Hu went on to win the next nine consecutive national championships, which gave him a 10-championship streak from 1960 to 1979 (due to the Cultural Revolution, the Chinese National Xiangqi Competition was not held annually during that period).

In the 1980s, Hu Ronghua won the national xiangqi championship in 1983 and 1985. By the mid-1990s, people thought that he was past his prime, and that younger generations of top players would eventually replace him. However, Ronghua won yet again in 1997 and 2000.

Hu Ronghua holds the record for the greatest number of national xiangqi titles (14), the youngest champion (age 15 in 1960) and the oldest champion (age 55 in 2000) in the history of the game.

== Contributing developments to xiangqi ==
Hu Ronghua has been advocating for a revival of xiangqi. In 2011 he launched a reality show called Let's Play Chess to find a new personal apprentice.

Hu Ronghua has made great additions to xiangqi theory, including pioneer work on the Fly-Elephant (飞相局) opening and the Counter-Palace-Knight (反宫马) opening. He also devised a new xiangqi rule: the chance of playing black is obtained by auctions of two players. The player who offers less time wins the auction. If the xiangqi game finally ends in a draw, black wins. The Hu Rule is aimed at eliminating "negative draw games" and making xiangqi more spectator-friendly. However, the Hu Rule was boycotted by other professional players, one year after its birth.

In 2022, Hu Ronghua made grandmaster live commentary at a major exposition of advanced Artificial Intelligence algorithms, applied directly to xiangqi.

== Other interests ==
In his early years, Hu Ronghua was trained for a short period in weiqi (Go). He also plays a game called daguailuzi(大怪路子)，a popular local game of Shanghai.

== Titles ==
- 1982: Grandmaster
- 1988: International Grandmaster of Chinese Chess.

== Publications ==
- XIANGQI Grandmaster Hu RongHua and his Elephant Openings (English publication 2017)
