= This Life of Mine (1950 film) =

- Film poster
- Directed by: Shi Hui
- Screenplay by: Yang Liuqing
- Based on: This Life of Mine by Lao She
- Produced by: Wu Xingzai
- Starring: Shi Hui; Heling Wei; Yang Shen; Wei Li; Zhi Cheng
- Cinematography: Ge Weiqing; Ma Linfa
- Edited by: Fu Jiqiu
- Music by: Huang Yijun
- Production company: Wenhua Film Company
- Release date: 31 October 1950
- Running time: 120 minutes
- Country: China
- Language: Mandarin

This Life of Mine (Wo zhe yi bei zi; Chinese: 我这一辈子) (also known as Life of a Beijing Policeman) is a 1950 Chinese film directed by Shi Hui.

== Plot summary ==
Adapted from the novella of the same name by Lao She, this film follows the life a Beijing police officer and his family from the fall of the Qing dynasty through the rise of Chinese Communism after World War II.

== Cast ==
- Shi Hui as I
- Heling Wei as Old Zhao
- Yang Shen as Shen Yuan
- Wei Li as Hai Fu
- Zhi Cheng as Hu Li
- Chaoming Cui as Sun Yuan
- Xiu Jiang as Master Qin
- Zhen Lin as Madame Qin
- Ming Liang as Sun Yuanqin
- Min Wang as My wife
