= The Letter with Feathers =

1954 film

Letter with Feather
- Film poster
- Directed by: Shi Hui
- Written by: Zhang Junxiang
- Starring: Cai Yuanyuan
- Cinematography: Luo Congzhou
- Music by: Huang Yijun
- Production company: Shanghai Film Studio
- Release date: 1954
- Running time: 70 minutes
- Country: China
- Language: Mandarin

Letter with Feather (simplified Chinese: 鸡毛信; traditional Chinese: 鷄毛信; pinyin: Jī máo xìn; lit. 'Chicken Feather Letter') (also known as Urgent Letter) is a 1954 Chinese film directed by Shi Hui and written by the playwright and filmmaker, Zhang Junxiang. A war film that was targeted at children, Letter with Feather focuses on a young boy who, through his wits, delivers an important message to the 8th Route Army while evading Imperial Japanese forces during the Second Sino-Japanese War.

== Plot ==
Haiwa (Cao Yuanyuan) is a twelve-year-old boy and the son of a guerrilla leader. One day, he is entrusted with urgent dispatch that must be brought to the Communist Eighth Route Army, which is fighting the Imperial Japanese Army in northeast China. The letter is marked with three feathers, indicating its importance. He embarks on his mission but must avoid the many Japanese patrols. At one point, he is forced to hide the dispatch under a sheep while posing as a shepherd. Later, he is captured by the Japanese who force him to act as a guide and scout. Using his wits, he leads the Japanese forces into an ambush, where they are killed and he is rescued. Delivering the important letter, the Communist army is able to use the information contained therein to capture a Japanese commander.

== Reception ==
Letter with Feather was extremely popular in China, with its message of patriotism to children. Indeed, it was one of a handful of films made before 1966 that was widely available during the Cultural Revolution.

Abroad, the film was also well received, winning a Best Film Award at the Edinburgh International Film Festival in 1955.
