= Night Inn =

- Film poster
- Directed by: Huang Zuolin
- Written by: Ke Ling
- Starring: Zhou Xuan
- Cinematography: Huang Shaofen; Xu Qi; Ge Weiqing
- Edited by: Fu Ji-qiu
- Music by: Wu Renji
- Production company: Wenhua Film Company
- Release date: 1947
- Running time: 107 minutes
- Country: China
- Language: Chinese (Mandarin)

Night Inn (Chinese: 夜店; pinyin: Yè Diàn) is a Chinese black-and-white film released in 1947, directed by Huang Zuolin and starring the popular Shanghai singer Zhou Xuan.

The film is based on the Chinese theatrical adaptation of Maxim Gorky's 1902 play The Lower Depths by playwright Ke Ling. The play and the film were both banned in China during the Cultural Revolution but were popular in the post-Mao period.
