= Good Food Fund =

Chinese NGO promoting plant-based diets

- 良食基金
- Formation: 2017; 9 years ago
- Purpose: Promotion of a plant-based diet
- Headquarters: Beijing
- Region served: China
- Official language: Mandarin Chinese, English
- President: Jian Yi
- Executive Director: Melinda Hou
- Chief Project Officer: Cecilia Zhou
- Website: goodfoodchina.net

The Good Food Fund (Chinese: 良食基金) is a Chinese non-profit promoting sustainable food systems transformation that was founded by Jian Yi. It mainly operates by organizing conferences such as the yearly Good Food Summit (良食峰会), which took place in 2017 in Yangzhou, in 2018 in Chengdu, in 2019 in Suzhou, and online in 2020. The Fund stated five main areas of concern in 2019: loss of biodiversity and climate change, hunger, unhealthy diets, food waste, abuse of farmed animals.

In November 2020, Animal Charity Evaluators announced the Good Food Fund as one of its twelve recommended charities, in the second of two tiers. As reasons for their recommendation, they cited the Fund's "strong programmatic work and their commitment to empowering other advocates".
