= Wenhua Film Company =

Chinese film company

Wenhua Film Company 文華影業公司
- Industry: Film
- Founded: 1946
- Founder: Wu Xingzai
- Defunct: 1952
- Headquarters: Shanghai, China
- Key people: Shi Hui, Fei Mu, Huang Zuolin, Eileen Chang
- Products: Films

The Wenhua Film Company (simplified Chinese: 文华影业公司; traditional Chinese: 文華影業公司; pinyin: Wénhuà yǐngyè gōngsī; lit. 'Culture China Film Company') was a Chinese major privately owned film production company headquartered in Shanghai, China. It was founded in 1946 and defunct in 1952 of the immediate post-war period in China.

== History ==
The film company was founded in 1946 by Wu Xingzai, a businessman who had previously controlled assets of the Lianhua Film Company during the mid-1930s. With Wenhua, Wu desired to have a film studio devoted to making smaller-budget art films, sophisticated comedies, and high-minded dramas. These films often focused on contemporary social issues such as feminism and adaptations of Western literature. These included Night Inn (1947), an adaptation of Maxim Gorky's The Lower Depths, and starring Zhou Xuan. but also comedies such as the Sang Hu-Eileen Chang collaboration, Long Live the Missus! (1947). During this early period, however, the company is perhaps best known as the producer of Fei Mu's masterpiece, Spring in a Small Town (1948).

Like other private studios, notably Kunlun Film Company, Wenhua continued in operation after the Communist takeover, putting out several films with the popular actor-director Shi Hui, including This Life of Mine (1950) (based on a novella by Lao She), Corruption (1950) (based on a work by Mao Dun), and the war film Platoon Commander Guan (1951). Yet many of these postwar films, particularly 1950s Peaceful Spring, were also criticized as hewing too close to Wenhua's pre-Communist humanist tradition. By 1952, Shi Hui had fallen out of the Party's favor, and Wenhua, like the other remaining private studios in Shanghai, was consolidated under state ownership.

== Notable films ==
Year	English Title	Chinese Title	Director	Cast
1946	Phony Phoenixes	假凤虚凰	Huang Zuolin	Shi Hui, Li Lihua
1947	Bright Day	艳阳天	Cao Yu	Shi Hui, Li Lihua
1947	Long Live the Missus!	太太万岁	Sang Hu	Shangguan Yunzhu, Shi Hui
1947	Night Inn	夜店	Huang Zuolin	Zhou Xuan
1948	Spring in a Small Town	小城之春	Fei Mu	Wei Wei, Zhang Hongmei, Li Wei
1949	Miserable at Middle Age	哀乐中年	Sang Hu	Shi Hui
1950	This Life of Mine	我这一辈子	Shi Hui	Shi Hui
1950	Peaceful Spring	太平春	Sang Hu	Shi Hui
1950	Ideological Problems	思想问题		
1950	Corruption	腐蚀	Huang Zuolin	Shi Hui
1951	Sisters Stand Up	姐姐妹妹站起来	Chen Xihe	
1951	Platoon Commander Guan	关连长	Shi Hui	Shi Hui
1951	A Window on America	美国之窗	Shi Hui, Huang Zuolin, Ye Ming	
