= This Life of Mine (novella) =

Book by Lao She

- Author: Lao She
- Original title: 我這一輩子
- Language: Chinese
- Publication place: China

This Life of Mine is a novella by Lao She. It was adapted into the film This Life of Mine in 1950.
