= Yang Mo =

Chinese writer

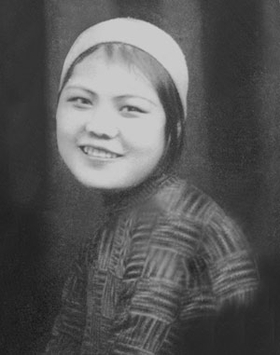
- Yang Mo
- Born: August 25, 1914; Beijing, China
- Died: December 11, 1995 (aged 81)
- Occupation: Author
- Relatives: Bai Yang (sister); Ma Bo (son)
- Writing career
- Notable works: Song of Youth; My Physician; The Red Morningstar Lily; The Best Song in Her Prime

Yang Mo (Chinese: 杨沫; August 25, 1914 – December 11, 1995) was a Chinese writer best known for her 1958 novel Song of Youth, which was adapted into a film in 1959.

== Bibliography ==
- Song of Youth (1958)
- Tenant (1963)
- My Physician (1964)
- The Red Morningstar Lily (1964)
- The Best Song in Her Prime (1986)

== See also ==
- List of Chinese films of the 1950s#1959
