= Flowers of the Motherland =

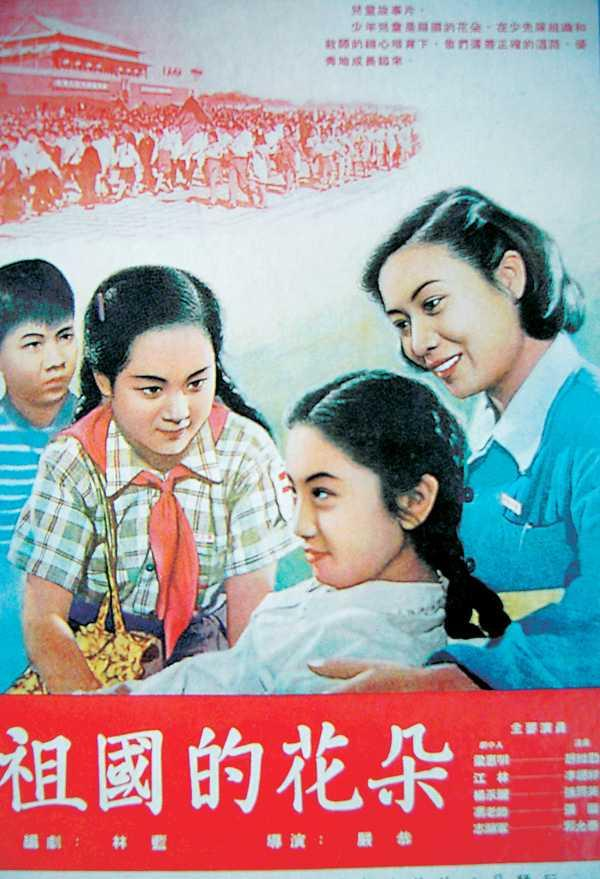
- Poster of 祖国的花朵
- Traditional Chinese: 祖國的花朵
- Simplified Chinese: 祖国的花朵
- Hanyu Pinyin: Zǔguó de Huāduǒ
- Directed by: Yan Gong
- Starring: Zhang Yunying; Li Xixiang; Zhao Weiqing
- Production company: Changchun Film Studio
- Release date: 1955
- Running time: 75 minutes
- Country: China
- Language: Mandarin

Flowers of the Motherland (simplified Chinese: 祖国的花朵; traditional Chinese: 祖國的花朵; pinyin: Zǔguó de Huāduǒ) is a 1955 Chinese drama-propaganda film, which was produced by Changchun Film Group Corporation. Being the first movie aimed to children after the creation of the People's Republic, the movie follows the primary school students' life after China's founding. It portrayed colorful clothing aimed to inspire viewers with hope.

== Plot ==
In a fictional Beijing primary school, Class One Grade Five (五年级甲班) has more than 40 students. These students have become Chinese Young Pioneers; except two students: the mischievous Jiang Lin (江林) and the brash, anti-social Yang Yongli (杨永丽).

On June 1, the students greeted the home-bound People's Volunteer Army in Zhongshan Park. Volunteer Yang Zhiping (杨志平) notices that two students don't wear red scarves, the Young Pioneers' insignia. Before he leaves, he encourages the students to study hard, help each other, and try to become a model class. Student Liang Huiming (梁慧明) is touched by his words and tries to help the two, but they do not appreciate it. This make Liang feel sad. Classmates sympathize with Liang and lose faith in the two.

The head teacher Feng encourages students to have patience. Later, classmates invite Jiang Lin to do an oxygen experiment, to make him interested in studying. While Yang Yongli's foot is scalded, they helped her make up homework, so that she can take exams with the class. In classmates helping, Yang and Jiang were moved, they progress together in summer vacation.

After summer vacation, the class became to grade six. Jiang Lin and Yang Yongli become Young Pioneers for their progress.

== Cast ==
- Zhang Yunying (张筠英) - Yang Yongli (杨永丽)
- Li Xixiang (李锡祥) － Jiang Lin (江林)
- Zhao Weiqing (赵维勤) － Liang Huiming (梁慧明)
- Guo Yuntai (郭允泰) － Yang Zhiping (杨志平)
- Shi Ling (石灵) － Yang Yongli's mother
- Lü Dayu (吕大渝) - Liu Jü (刘菊)

== In literature ==
While being tortured by a Beijing agent in the novel Performance Anomalies, the spy hero Cono 7Q, partly of Chinese origin, sings the lyrics to the song "Let Us Sway Twin Oars Together" [讓我們蕩起雙槳] by Qiao Yu from the well-known 1950s Chinese propaganda film "Flowers of the Motherland" [also translated as "Bud of the Motherland"]. His torturers' recognition of the song causes them to hesitate, saving Cono 7Q's life.

== Legacy ==
- Due to the movie's depiction of children's lives, Chinese people usually use the movie title "Flowers of the Motherland" to praise children.
- The interlude song "Let us Sway Twin Oars" (讓我們蕩起雙槳) was included in China's primary school music textbook, and became a famous children's song.
