= Zhang Junxiang =

Chinese film director and playwright

- Born: 27 December 1910
- Died: 14 November 1996 (aged 85)
- Occupation: Film director
- Years active: 1947-1982
- Spouse: Zhou Xiaoyan (m. 1952)

Zhang Junxiang (simplified Chinese: 张骏祥; traditional Chinese: 張駿祥; pinyin: Zhāng Jùnxiáng) (December 27, 1910 – November 14, 1996) was a Chinese film director and playwright. Born in Zhenjiang in China's Jiangsu province, Zhang was educated first at Tsinghua University in Beijing, then at Yale University in the United States.

Zhang acted in the 1982 film Da ze long she, about an armed conflict between coal miners and management set in the 1920s. In addition to this he also wrote the 1954 war film Letter with Feather. In 1959, he was a member of the jury at the 1st Moscow International Film Festival.

Zhang died in Shanghai in 1996.

== Selected filmography ==
=== As director ===
Year	English Title	Chinese Title	Notes
1947	Diary of a Homecoming	还乡日记	
1947	The Great Son-In-Law	乘龙快婿	Also known as Lucky Homecoming
1950	Red Banner on the Emerald Ridge	翠岗红旗	
1954	Huai shang ren jia	淮上人家	
1962	Fire on the Plain	燎原	
1964	Doctor Bethune	白求恩大夫	
1977	Da qing zhan ge	大庆战歌	
1982	Da ze long she	大泽龙蛇	

=== As screenwriter ===
Year	English Title	Chinese Title	Notes
1947	Cheng long kuai xu	乘龙快婿	
1947	Hai xiang ri ji	还乡日记	
1951	Reunion after Victory	胜利重逢	
1954	Letter with Feather	鸡毛信	
1964	Doctor Bethune	白求恩大夫	
