= Song of Youth (novel) =

1958 novel by Yang Mo

- Author: Yang Mo
- Language: Chinese
- Published: 1958
- Publisher: Beijing Press
- Publication place: China

Song of Youth (Chinese: 青春之歌) is a novel created by Chinese contemporary writer Yang Mo, published in 1958.

This book is a semi-autobiographical novel written based on her own experience. The novel takes place during the patriotic student movement from the Mukden Incident (Chinese: 九一八事变) through to the December 9th Movement (Chinese: 一二·九运动), which occurred during the Japanese invasion of China in the 1937 as the background. The novel constructs a classic narrative of revolutionary history through the growth story of the heroine Lin Daojing.

== Background and creation process ==
Yang Mo created Lin Daojing as the protagonist based on her personal life experience. Before joining the revolution, Lin Daojing's life experience is basically that of the author; and after joining the revolution, the thing she goes through is the summary of the experience of many revolutionaries. The author's family is similar to the feudal landlord family where Lin Daojing is born. When Yang Mo was young, she came into contact with some revolutionary comrades who had received Marxist–Leninist education and therefore hated the dark decayed of her family. She could not tolerate the selfishness, cruelty, hypocrisy and vileness of the landlord class. After finishing middle school, the author broke up with her family. She went through a lot of hard times such as out of school and out of work. Suffering from years of hard war also led to her frailty and illness, but she preserved with tenacity and wrote the first draft of Song of Youth during 1950–1952. Song of Youth earned Yang Mo great prestige and honor, Yang Mo continued to absorb some comments from readers, and took three months to make another revision and add eleven chapters. The novel accumulated more than 400,000 works and was reprinted in 1960.

== Content summary ==
Lin Daojing is a high school student in Beiping. One autumn morning in the early 1930s, she boards a train from Beiping to Beidaihe. She is a beautiful, quiet, and hesitant girl who is plainly dressed and carries musical instrument in her arms. She just runs away from home. Lin Daojing is born into a large landowning family, her father is a university principal who has fame and wealth. Her mother is the daughter of a sharecropper. After giving birth to Lin Daojing, her mother is kicked out of the family and dies shortly after. Lin Daojing's adoptive mother forces her to marry Hu Mengan, a chief of public security in Beiping. Lin Daojing runs away alone to Beidaihe soon to finds her cousin, who is an elementary school teacher. However, when she arrives, her cousin has already left and the principal is enthusiastic to keep her. In fact, the principal has ulterior motives in mind and wants to give her to the governor as a concubine. Lin Daojing is so angry that she tries to commit suicide by jumping into the sea, but is saved by Yu Yongze, a university student. The two gradually develop a romantic relationship.

After the Mukden Incident, the anti-Japanese movement begins, Lin Daojing returns to Beiping to work with patriots to promote the movement, while Yu Yongze is busy pursuing personal fame and fortune. At this time, Lin Daojing meets a like-minded revolutionary-Lu Jiachuan. Lu Jiachuan is a university student in Beijing University. He is brave and resolute, and actively goes south to join the student movement of anti-Japanese demonstrations. Lin Daojing continues to grow and participates in parade. Gradually, she gets to know many patriotic students and develops a strong desire to know more about Marxist social science. When she meets Lu Jiachuan again, Lu encourages Lin to integrate into society and join in the revolution. Compared with Lu, Yu Yongze interferes with Lin Daojing and does not save Lu Jiachuan when he is rounded up by the gendarmes. Lin Daojing finally could not stand Yu Yongze’s selfish actions and breaks up with him.

Lin Daojing then participates in all sorts of revolutionary activities, but because of insufficient experience and the rebellion of Dai Yu within the party, she is kidnapped by Hu Mengan. With the help of companions, she escapes, comes to Dingxian to become a primary school teacher and meets Jiang Hua. Jiang Hua is a communist who guides Lin Daojing to go deep into the countryside, organize the people and turn revolutionary ideals into practical action. With the help of Lin Hong who is a member of the Chinese Communist Party (CCP), Lin Daojing resists the harsh penalties and strengthens her revolutionary will after she is arrested in Beiping. After she is released from prison, she becomes a member of the CCP and works in the Party organs. During this time, Jiang Hua also returns to Beiping and announces the death sentence of the traitor Dai Yu on behalf of the CCP.

Thereafter, Lin Daojing is sent to Beijing University. Although the students there distrusts her, with Jiang Hua's help, lin overcomes the difficulties, penetrates into the student organization, exposes the spies together with the students. She gradually gains the trust of the students and inspires their revolutionary spirits.

On December 9, 1935, these university patriotic students marches in the streets for anti-Japanese movements. Lin Daojing gets together with Jiang Hua and all the progressive youth, these revolutionary fighters continue to dedicate themselves to the revolution.

== Theme ==
The novel was the first PRC-novel to depict a female student's journey towards becoming a revolutionary. In telling this story, it addresses themes of femininity, romantic love, and marriage.

Song of Youth portrays a series of intellectuals with distinctive images. The paths they take are varied due to their different class origins, different attitude toward life, and their diverse ideologies. The novel focuses on the "growth history" of modern Chinese "intellectuals". The protagonist, Lin Daojing, grows step by step from an intellectual to a communist fighter. The novel depicts the different stages of her transformation into a proletarian revolutionary fighter from the reality of her life. From the uncertainty and bitterness of being stuck by reality at the beginning, to begins to pursue her quest under the inspiration of Lu Jiachuan. Through the study of Marxism–Leninism and revolutionary exercises, she overcomes her weakness and hesitation, embarks on a revolutionary mileage. After heavy physical torture and severe test death, she finally grows into a proletarian pioneer fighter.

== Reception ==
Song of Youth was well-received both domestically and overseas and it was repeatedly re-published with circulation exceeding 5 million copies. High-level Chinese leaders, including Zhou Enlai, Peng Zhen, Zhou Yang, and Mao Dun praised the book and the Communist Youth League called on young people to study it. Song of Youth was translated into about twenty different languages. The Communist Party of Japan and the Communist Party of Indonesia made the novel required reading for their memberships. Both the novel and its 1959 film adaptation remained popular after the Mao era.

== Adaptation ==
In 1959, Song of Youth was adapted into a movie of the same name. The film removes the romantic attraction with the leading male Communist character.

A 2006 TV remake of the movie ran for 25 episodes.

== See also ==
- Women writers in Chinese literature
- Yang Mo
