= Jian Yi =

Chinese filmmaker and food activist

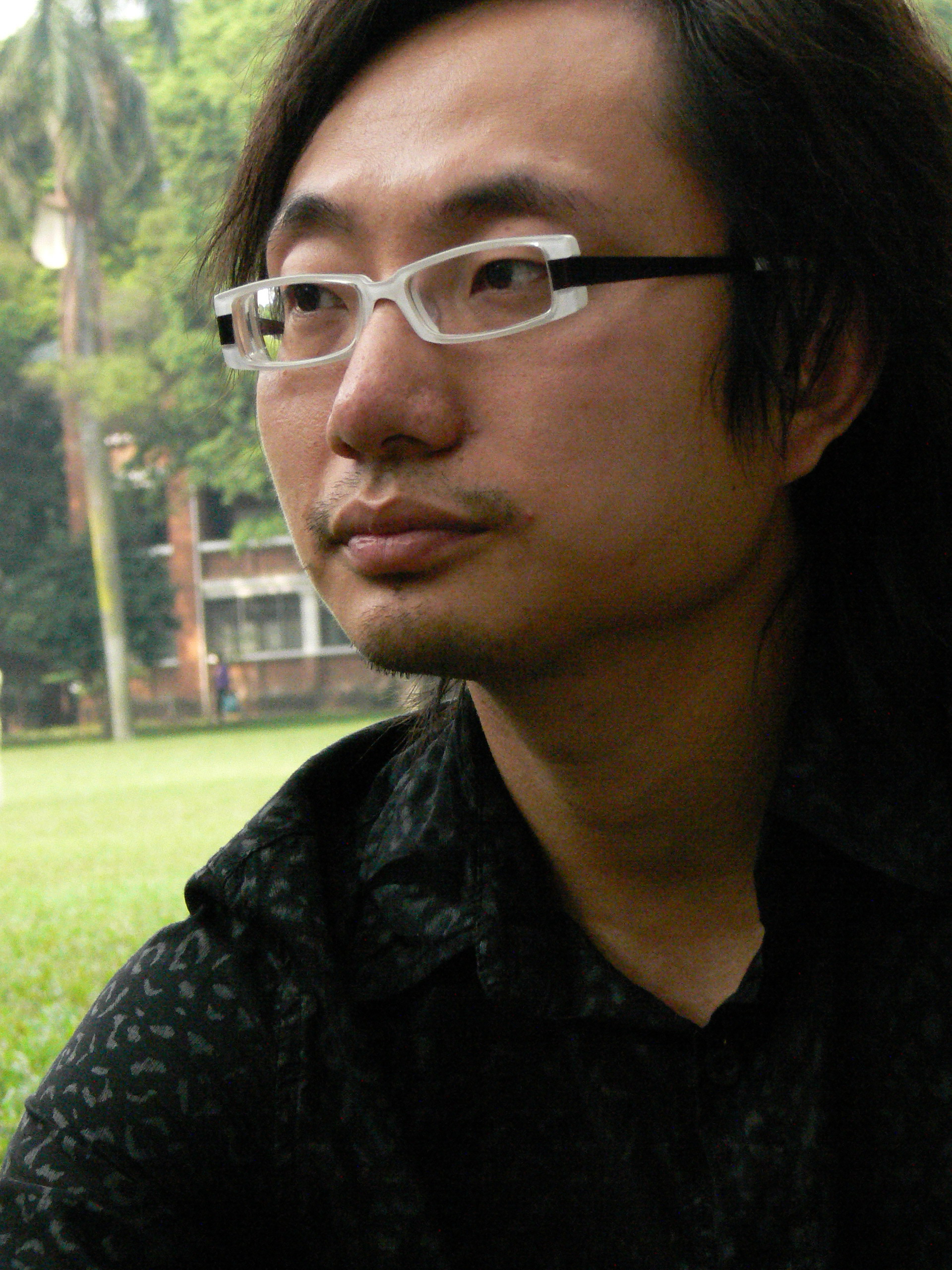
- Born: Ji'an, Jiangxi, China
- Education: Harvard Kennedy School (MPA, 2022); Yale University (Yale World Fellow, 2009); Beijing Broadcasting Institute, MA, 1999); University of Notre Dame (MA, 1998)
- Occupation: Director
- Years active: 2000s-present
- Awards: Montreal World Film Festival Bronze Zenith Award, 2007 (Bamboo Shoots); Barcelona Asian Film Festival Digital Cinema Award (Bamboo Shoots); Cambridge Film Festival Official Selection, 2007 (Super, Girls!); Minneapolis-St. Paul International Film Festival Official Selection, 2007 (Super, Girls!); Documentary Fortnight, Museum of Modern Art, New York, 2009 (Super, Girls!)

Chinese name
- Traditional Chinese: 簡藝
- Simplified Chinese: 简艺
Transcriptions
Standard Mandarin
- Hanyu Pinyin: Jiǎn Yì

Jian Yi (Chinese: 简艺; pinyin: jiǎn yì) is a Chinese independent filmmaker, social innovator and food activist who currently serves as a Senior Fellow on Food Systems at the Harvard Law School. His films Bamboo Shoots and Super, Girls! won a number of international film festival awards. Jian Yi co-founded the ground-breaking China Villager Documentary Project with filmmaker Wu Wenguang in 2004, and founded the IFChina Original Studio in 2008. His works have been shown at numerous film festivals, museums (including at the Museum of Modern Art in New York) and university campuses across the globe. Jian Yi also spoke at the Apple Artists' Series among many public and media talks, including the BBC and the National Public Radio.

Since 2014, Jian Yi has been at the forefront of promoting sustainable food system in China. He founded and preside the Good Food Fund under the China Biodiversity Conservation and Green Development Foundation, one of the ten global Top Visionaries named by the Rockefeller Foundation for its 2050 Food Systems Vision Prize. He was frequently interviewed by international media for his views and work on China's food systems. Jian Yi appeared on Eating Animals, a documentary produced by Natalie Portman; and on Food 2050, a docu-series produced by the Rockefeller Foundation, which was adapted into a feature length documentary narrated by Viola Davis and premiered at Sundance Film Festival 2026.

Jian Yi served on the Core Leadership Team of Action Track 2 of the United Nations Food Systems Summit between 2020 and 2021 and led the initial Workstream 1 on Food Environments. He has served on a number of roles related to this, including on several UNFSS action areas, FoodXFilm Festival, etc. Jian Yi also led his colleagues to set up the China Action Hub for UNFSS AT2, and organized 10+ independent dialogues on food systems in the first half of 2021, with a combined views of 1 million for their livestreams across platforms.

Jian Yi founded the China Vegan Society, which was officially launched in Dali, Yunnan, in May 2021, receiving supporting messages from celebrated figures such as Peter Singer, Dr. Jane Goodall, and Joaquin Phoenix.

== Education ==
Jian Yi got three Master's degrees respectively an MPA from Harvard Kennedy School of Government, an MA in International Journalism from Beijing Broadcasting Institute, and an MA in International Peace Studies from the University of Notre Dame. Jian Yi received the Distinguished Alumni Award from the Kroc Institute of International Peace Studies at the University of Notre Dame in 2015. While at Harvard, he was a Mason Fellow and a Gleitsman Leadership Fellow of the Center for Public Leadership. Jian Yi conducts research at the Animal Law and Policy Program at the Harvard Law School between 2022 and 2024, and at Harvard Law School's the Food Law and Policy Clinic beginning in June 2024. He got a Bachelor of Education in Education Management from Jiangxi Normal University in 1995.

He was a tenured lecturer/assistant professor at the Communication University of China for five years (1999–2004).

== Filmmaking ==
Jian Yi is the founder and director of ARTiSIMPLE Studio, which was founded in January 2005 and has pioneered the art of collaborative community and citizen projects. In 2005–2006, he partnered with premier documentary filmmaker Wu Wenguang to launch the China Villager Documentary Project. Jian's photos on China's village governance toured the nation's seven provinces as well as the headquarters of the European Commission in Brussels and the Seat of the European Parliament in Strasbourg.

In 2007, Jian Yi won the Bronze Zenith Award at the 31st Montreal World Film Festival for his feature film Dong Sun ("Bamboo Shoots"), one of only two Asian films to win an award. In 2007 Jian also produced and directed Super, Girls!, the only independently produced documentary film about the Super Girl singing contest, one of the most popular TV shows in China's history. As a result, he was one of the three Chinese national finalists selected by the British Council for the 2007 International Young Film Entrepreneur of the Year award. (Bamboo Shoots officially hit Canadian cinemas on August 26, 2010.)

== Social memories and civic engagement ==
Jian launched the IFChina in his hometown of Ji'an, birthplace of Mao Zedong's Revolution, in 2008–2009 with Douglas Xiao and Eva Song. IFChina was China's first civic engagement center that focuses solely on documenting social memories through the use of filmmaking, photography, oral history and theater. It was inspired by the China Villager Documentary Project, co-founded by Wu Wenguang and Jian Yi in 2004.

== Food systems activism ==
Jointly with Yale Hospitality of Yale University, Jian started a food leadership initiative in 2018 and during the Chinese New Year in 2019, he headed a delegation of seven top Chinese chefs, entrepreneurs, journalists and toured five U.S. universities (Yale, UMass, Harvard, UConn and CIA), where they coached chefs in the host universities on preparing for Chinese New Year banquets and were engaged in dialogues on sustainable food system. The tour was taken place under the theme of the Food Forward Forum.

== Other activism ==
In 2012–2014, he lived and worked at the 1700-year-old Buddhist monastery at the foot of Mount Lu, a World Heritage Site.

Jian Yi served as a member of the Art Advisory Board for the Yale-China Association. He was the founding president of the Notre Dame Club of Beijing in 2006.

=== Fellowships ===
- 2024- Senior Fellow, U.S.-China Food Systems, Food Law and Policy Clinic, Harvard Law School
- 2022-2024 Visiting Fellow, Brooks McCormick Jr. Animal Law and Policy Program, Harvard Law School.
- 2021 Gleitsman Leadership Fellow, the Center for Public Leadership, Harvard Kennedy School, Harvard University
- 2011 delegate to the Asia Society's Asia 21 Young Leaders Summit in Jakarta, Indonesia
- 2009 Yale World Fellow (Yale University, New Haven, CT)
- 2008–2010 India-China Fellow (New School, New York City)
- 2007–2008 Starr Foundation Fellowship (Asian Cultural Council, New York City)
- 2007 Visiting Fellow, CRASSH (University of Cambridge, Cambridge, UK)

=== Awards ===
Bamboo Shoots

- Bronze Zenith Award, 27th Montreal World Film Festival
- Digital Cinema Award, 10th Barcelona Asian Film Festival
- Official Selection, Minneapolis-St. Paul International Film Festival, 2008
- Official Selection, 10th Osian's Cinefan Festival of Asian and Arab Cinema, 2008

Super Girls!

- Official Selection, Cambridge Film Festival, 2007
- Official Selection, Documentary Fortnight, Museum of Modern Art, New York, 2008

=== Filmography ===
Year	English Title	Chinese Title	Notable screenings
2007–2009	New Socialist Climax (documentary)	红色之旅	
2007	Bamboo Shoots (narrative)	冬笋	Solo screening, Hong Kong Art Center, 2010
2007	Super, Girls! (documentary)	超级女生	Cherry Lane Movies, Beijing; Caochangdi Workstation, Beijing; Brooklyn Academy of Music; Yale University; New York University; University of Southern California; University of California, Los Angeles; California College of the Arts; China Institute
2007–2009	JI'AN 24x60' (experimental video, 24 minutes)	吉安 24x60	
2009	Remote Control (experimental video, 11 minutes)	遥控	
2009	What's for Dinner (29', documentary)	何以为食	
2012	Global Civics (documentary)	全球公民	
2014–2016	The 1000-Hour Film Project: Stories of Birth (documentary)	1000小时的电影：《生的故事》	
2017-	Zodiac 12 (documentary)	《十二生肖》	

=== External links ===
- Good Food Fund/Academy
- China Village Documentary Project
- Artisimple.com
- IfChina.org
- https://news.yale.edu/2019/01/31/how-did-yale-hospitality-become-lean-green-leader-even-chinas-asking
- https://news.yale.edu/2019/02/01/yale-hosts-top-chinese-chefs-sustainability-focused-culinary-exchange
- https://www.chinadialogue.net/article/show/single/en/11062-A-less-meaty-Year-of-the-Pig-
- Yale World Fellows Program
- China Vegan Society
- https://www.plantforwardkitchen.org/jian-yi

==== Interviews ====
- Roger Ebert Show - Chinese Cinema, Oct. 2011
- "You Can't Build on an Emptiness," by Dan Edwards, Real Time Arts
- China Dialogue
- Eating Animals - the documentary: http://www.eatinganimalsmovie.com/
- https://www.theguardian.com/environment/2019/mar/29/can-the-world-quench-chinas-bottomless-thirst-for-milk
- China's cloned cows: meat on the table or environmental disaster? https://www.theguardian.com/global-development/2015/dec/05/chinas-cloned-cows-meat-on-the-table-or-environmental-disaster
- Bloomberg story on China's wet market after outbreak of COVID-19 on 2020: https://www.ndtvprofit.com/world/wuhan-is-returning-to-life-so-are-its-disputed-wet-markets-10249987
- China Wakes Up to the Need of a Greener Diet: https://www.ft.com/content/afc52d70-1bab-4375-984e-7814a1d0aa7d
- The Rockefeller Foundation short documentary about Jian Yi and the Good Food Fund's vision: https://foodxfilmfestival.org/rockefeller-foundation
