= Li Wei (actor) =

Chinese actor (1919–2005)

Li Wei (李纬 born Li Zhiyuan 李志远 1919 – 21 August 2005) was a Chinese actor.

== Filmography ==
- 1948 Spring in a Small Town (小城之春)
- 1964 Two Stage Sisters (舞台姐妹)
- 1983 River Without Buoys (没有航标的河流)
- 1990 Ju Dou, Yang Jin-Shan as the elderly husband who buys a wife played by Gong Li
