= DGenerate Films =

American film distributor

dGenerate Films
- Type: Private company
- Industry: film distribution
- Founded: 2008
- Founder: Karin Chien
- Headquarters: Brooklyn, New York,
- Products: Film distribution, international co-production
- Website: dGenerateFilms.com

dGenerate Films is a non-theatrical distributor of award-winning independent films from China. Their aim is to bring more images of contemporary life in mainland China to U.S. audiences. The company was launched in 2008 by American independent film veterans, including producer Karin Chien.

dGenerate Films has the international rights to nearly forty independent Chinese films, and they distribute them abroad mostly to educational institutions and festivals, though they also are available to a general audience. Many of them are smuggled illegally out of China, where the uncensored films are considered to be counter-government.
