= Wu Wenguang =

Chinese filmmaker

Wu Wenguang (Chinese: 吴文光; born 1956 in Yunnan) is a Chinese independent documentary filmmaker. He is known internationally as one of the founding figures of Chinese independent documentary. His first film, Bumming in Beijing: The Last Dreamers, featured a large amount of handheld camerawork and unscripted interviews. This was a stark contrast to Chinese documentaries produced previously, which were generally carefully planned and controlled.
