= Huang Zuolin =

Chinese film director

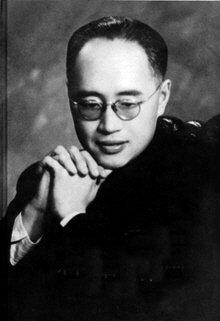
- Born: 黄作霖; October 24, 1906; Tianjin
- Died: June 1, 1994 (aged 87)
- Occupation: Director
- Children: Huang Shuqin (daughter)
- Relatives: Huang Zuoshen (brother)

Huang Zuolin (Chinese: 黄作霖 known as 黄佐临; October 24, 1906 – June 1, 1994) was a Chinese film director.

== Life ==
Huang Zuolin whose ancestral home was at Panyu, Guangdong Province, was born in Tianjin. He graduated from Tientsin Anglo-Chinese College in 1925. During the period of 1925 to 1929, he studied business in University of Birmingham and lived in Linxi College located in the suburbs. At the party organized by the students of this college, Huang Zuolin performed the one-act play, East and West, which was written and directed by himself. Then Huang Zuolin sent this play to George Bernard Shaw to express the worship of him and Henrik Ibsen and got a reply:

"Ibsen, is a disciple, not a master;

George Bernard Shaw, is a follower, not a master;

Ibsen does not belong to ibsenist, he is Ibsen;

I do not belong to Bernard shawnist, I am Bernard shaw;

If you want to have some achievements, you should not be a disciple; You must be creative."

From that point on, George Bernard Shaw became Huang Zuolin's first teacher who introduced art to him and was revered by him all his life.

In 1929, Huang Zuolin returned to China and served as honorary president of Tientsin Anglo-Chinese College. In 1935, he, together with his wife Jin Yunzhi (Danny), once again traveled to Britain to study Shakespeare at King's College, Cambridge, where he completed his M. Litt. thesis, and while in England also studied theatre direction with the famous French director Michel Saint-Denis at the London Theatre Studio.

He returned to China after the breakout of the Second Sino-Japanese War in 1937. Before Huang's departure, Shaw sent him the following words:

"Rise up, China!

You are the future of the eastern world.

If you have courage and determination to hold it,

the future stage will be for Chinese drama.

Don't follow my plays, you can create your own."

In 1938, he taught in Chongqing National Drama Institute. Then he rehearsed and played The True Story of Ah Q as well as teaching. He reached Shanghai in 1939, serving successively as director of the Shanghai Theater Society, Shanghai Professional Theatrical Troupe, and Shanghai Art Troupe. In 1942, under the tenet of "working together and working hard", Huang Zuolin, along with Huang Zongjiang and Shihui, established the Hardworking Opera Troupe, which was later renamed the Hardworking Drama Training Institute where they directed Liang Shang Jun Zi (梁上君子) and The inn at night.

In the autumn of 1946, he took part in the establishment of Wenhua Film Company and worked as a director. The first film he directed was a satirical comedy called Phony Phoenixes. He used strong comedy expression to satirise the prevailing atmosphere of deception in that society. The film was the first one in China which was dubbed into English and exported to foreign countries. Later, he also directed many films, such as Night Inn and Corruption. In 1949, Huang Zuolin adapted and directed the film The Watch, which was unique and had a different method of expression from traditional films. He employed some amateurs and little-known performers, among whom were orphans from the orphanage and street children. The film was listed, by French film historian Georges Sadoul, as one of the few famous Chinese films in the general history of the world's film. At the end of 1948, Huang Zuolin took part in the preparation work for an underground Association of Film Workers. In 1950 he became one of the co-founders of Shanghai People's Art Theater, successively serving as assistant dean, dean and emeritus dean for forty-four years.

In 1962, he proposed a creative view on drama of depicted desires and advocated a Chinese contemporary, ethnical, and scientific dramatic system. In 1989, he wrote "I stand for the concept of enjoyable drama because of the 50 or 60-year-long practice on stage, the assiduous research into world dramatic development history and the following well-known sayings: True and false dramas are all pleasant. It will not be a drama if it does not resemble [life]. It is a drama as well as an art. There are three types of paintings: the first ones are those extraordinarily similar to the object, which are false paintings. The second ones are those not similar to the objects at all, which are always painter's spiritual expression by image. They are also false paintings. The third ones are those between the above extremes which can be called true paintings. They are much higher, stronger, more centralized, typical and ideal than real life. So they are more universal. Sense and sensibility as well as form and spirit can not be divided."

Huang Zuolin's father once served as the comprador of Shell lntemationaI Oil Products B.V. During the Cultural Revolution, Huang Zuolin suffered because of his father's job and was interrogated (Life and Death in Shanghai Author: Nien Cheng Page 326. Cheng was one of Huang Zuolin and his wife's good friends during their study in Britain.)

Over the nearly 60 years of his art career, Huang Zuolin introduced the ideas and practices of Konstantin Stanislavski, Bertolt Brecht, Jerzy Grotowski, as well as many other schools of dramatic thought, to Chinese theatre workers. He also directed around 100 plays and films and encouraged a large number of theatre and film workers. In 1988, he received the Drama Director Award (lifetime award) issued by the Institute of Chinese Drama.

On June 1, 1994, he died in the Shanghai Huadong Hospital.

Huang Zuolin was the representative of the first, second, and third session of the National People's Congress (NPC) of the People's Republic of China. He was also a member of the fifth session of the Chinese People's Political Consultative Congress (CPPCC), vice president of China Theater Association, and vice chairman of Shanghai People's Association for Friendship with Foreign Countries.

On October 24, 1995, a statue of Huang Zuolin was unveiled on the lawn of former Shanghai People's Art Theatre.

Since 1996, Shanghai Dramatic Arts Centre established the Zuolin Dramatic Art Award (Zuolin Award), carrying forward his spirit of "devoting one's whole life to drama with loyalty to the art, caring about neither fame nor profit", to be awarded to theatre professionals making special contributions to dramatic art, and who demonstrate deep love for their careers.

In June 1999, his daughter, Huang Shuqin, made a donation to the Shanghai Library of more than 3,000 English books and over 140 manuscripts, letters, literature, pictures and works collected by Huang Zuolin, including some correspondence between George Bernard Shaw and Huang Zuolin.

== Works ==
- Words from directors (1979)
- Talk on Dramatic View
- I and My View on Drama of Depicted Desires

== Filmography ==
- Phony Phoenixes (假凤虚凰)
- Night Inn (夜店)
- Corruption (腐蚀)
- The Watch (表)
- A Window on America (美国之窗)
- Cuckoo Cuckoo Again (布谷鸟又叫了)
- Story of the Huangpu River (黄浦江的故事)
- Mayor Chen Yi
