= List of Chinese films before 1930 =

This is a list of the earliest films produced and released before 1930 during the Qing dynasty and Republican China, ordered by year of release.

For an alphabetical listing of Chinese films see Category:Chinese films.

== 1905–1929 ==
Title	Chinese Title	Director	Actors	Genre	Notability
1905
Dingjun Mountain	定軍山	Ren Jingfeng	Tan Xinpei	Historical Drama	This recording of a Beijing opera performance constitutes the first Chinese film ever made
1913
The Difficult Couple	難夫難妻	Zhang Shichuan, Zheng Zhengqiu		Short	First Chinese short feature film
Zhuangzi Tests His Wife	Zhuangzi shi qi	Li Beihai		Drama	The earliest feature film of Hong Kong cinema
1917
Victims of Opium	黑籍冤魂	Zhang Shichuan, Guan Haifeng		Drama/Social Criticism	Based on a novel by Wu Jianren
1921
Yan Ruisheng	閻瑞生	Ren Pengnian		Docudrama	First full-length Chinese film, a dramatized recreation of a 1920 Shanghai murder case
1922
Laborer's Love	勞工之愛情	Zhang Shichuan		Silent	Earliest surviving complete film
An Empty Dream	?	Ren Pengnian	?	Wuxia	
The King of Comedy Visits Shanghai	滑稽大王遊滬記	Zhang Shichuan	Richard Bell, Zheng Zhengqiu, Zheng Zhegu	Silent	Slapstick comedy about a fictional visit by Charlie Chaplin
The Sea Oath	海誓	Dan Duyu	Yin Mingzhu	Drama	
Women Skeletons	紅粉骷髏	Guan Haifeng		Action/Crime	One of the earliest Chinese films with extensive martial arts scenes.
1923
Dreams of a Taoist Priest	清虛夢	Ren Pengnian		Short	Adapted from a short story in Pu Songling's Strange Stories from a Chinese Studio
The Filial Wife's Soup	孝婦羹	Ren Pengnian	Wang Fuqing	Drama	Adapted from a short story in Pu Songling's Strange Stories from a Chinese Studio
The Lotus Falls	蓮花落	Ren Pengnian	Zhang Huichong	Drama	Adapted from a classic Chinese opera
Orphan Rescues Grandfather	孤兒救祖記	Zhang Shichuan	Wang Hanlun, Zheng Xiaoqiu, Wang Xianzhai	Drama	First major success by Mingxing
The Predestined	鬆柏緣	Ren Pengnian	Xu Suzhen, Wang Fuqing	Drama	
The Widow Wants to Remarry	古井重波記	Dan Duyu		Drama	
Zhang Xinsheng	張欣生	Zhang Shichuan		Crime	Early Mingxing Film Company production based on a real-life patricidal case.
1924
The Abandoned Child	棄兒	Dan Duyu	Dan Erchun	Drama	Adaptation of Charles Dickens's "Oliver Twist"
A Couple Through Water and Fire	水火鴛鴦	Cheng Bugao		Romance	Cast consisted of child actors, averaging about 10 years of age
A Gallant Young Man	俠義少年			Crime	Alternate title: A Chivalrous Youth
Dear Brother	好兄弟	Ren Pengnian	Zhang Huichong	Drama	
The Divorcee	棄婦	Li Zeyuan; Hou Yao	Wang Hanlun	Drama	Tragedy advocating greater rights for women
Lured Into Marriage	誘婚	Zhang Shichuan	Zheng Zhengqiu, Maxu Weibang, Yang Naimei	Drama	Alternate title: Love and Vanity
Patriotic Umbrella	愛國傘	Ren Pengnian	Zhang Huichong	Action/Crime	
The Poor Children	苦儿弱女	Zhang Shichuan	Wang Hanlun; Yang Naimei; Wang Xianzhai	Drama	
Public Opinion	人心	Gu Kenfu, Chen Shouyin	Wang Yuanlong, Zhang Zhiyun, Xu Su'e	Romance	Alternate title: Human Feelings
Righteousness Above Family	大義滅親	Ren Pengnian		Drama	Alternate title: The Edge of Chivalry
The Soul of Yuli	玉梨魂	Zhang Shichuan	Wang Hanlun; Yang Naimei; Wang Xianzhai	Drama/Social Criticism	Adapted from a novel by Xu Zhenya, an early plea for increased rights for women.
Tea-Picking Girl	采茶女	Xu Hu	Yang Naimei	Romance	
Tide of Evil	孽海潮	Chen Shouyin		Crime	
Younger Brother	弟弟	Dan Duyu	He Rongzhu	Drama	
1925
A Blind Orphan Girl	盲孤女	Zhang Shichuan	Xuan Jinglin; Zheng Xiaoqiu	Drama	
A Fatal Love	情天劫	Ren Pengnian	Wang Fuqing; Ren Aizhu	Drama	
A Home Truth	情海風波	Zhang Huichong	Zhang Huichong; Xu Su'e	Crime/Action	
A Peach Blossom in Human Form	人面桃花	Chen Shouyin	Huang Yulin; Mao Jianpei	Romance	
A Pitiful Girl	可憐的閨女	Zhang Shichuan	Zhang Zhiyun	Drama	
A Shanghai Woman	上海一婦人	Zhang Shichuan	Xuan Jinglin; Maxu Weibang	Drama	
A String of Pearls	一串珍珠	Li Zeyuan		Drama	Adaptation of Maupassant's "The Necklace"
A Student's Suffering	苦學生	Guan Haifeng		Drama	
Awakening	覺悟	Ling Lianying		Drama	
Battle Exploits	戰功	Xu Xinfu	Wang Yuanlong; Zhang Zhiyun	War/Romance	
Between Love and Filial Duty	摘星之女	Li Zeyuan; Mei Xuechou	Wang Hanlun; Lei Xiadan	Romance	
Cupid's Puppets	愛伸的玩偶	Mei Xuechou; Hou Yao		Drama	
The Dream of Women 1	南华梦	Zhang Puyi	Zhang Wuzhi; Jiang Naifang; Yao Juezhen; Zhong Fudong	Drama	Alternate title: South China Dream
The Dream of Women 2	南华梦	Zhang Puyi	Zhang Wuzhi; Jiang Naifang; Yao Juezhen; Zhong Fudong	Drama	Alternate title: South China Dream
Eternal Regret for Drunkenness	醉鄉遺恨	Yang Xiaozhong		Drama	
The Good Brothers	好哥哥	Zhang Shichuan	Zheng Zhegu; Yang Naimei	Drama	
Heroine Li Feifei	女俠李飛飛	Shao Zuiweng	Fen Juhua; Wu Suxin	Action/Romance	
The Last Conscience	最后之良心	Zhang Shichuan	Wang Xianzhai; Xuan Jinglin	Drama	
Little Friend	小朋友	Zhang Shichuan	Zheng Xiaoqiu; Xuan Jinglin	Drama	Based on the novel Sans Famille by Hector Malot
Out of Hell	劫后緣	Zhang Huichong	Zhang Huichong; Xu Su'e	Action	Alternate title: Lovers From a Den of Thieves
Past Loves	前情	Zhu Shouju	Wang Yingzhi	Drama	
The Person in the Boudoir Dream	春閨夢裡人	Li Zeyuan; Mei Xuechou	Wang Hanlun	War	
Repentance	立地成佛	Shao Zuiweng		Drama	
Some Girl	重返故鄉	Dan Duyu	Yin Mingzhu	Morality Play	Alternate title: Returning Home
The Stormy Night	風雨之夜	Zhu Shouju	Wang Yingzhi; Han Yunzhen	Comedy	
Tears on the Battlefield	沙場淚	Cheng Bugao	Zhou Wenzhu	War/Romance	
There's a Full Moon Tonight	花好月圓	Qiu Qixiang	Ding Ziming; Li Pingqian	Romance	Alternate title: Conjugal Bliss
True Love	真愛	Chen Tian		Tragedy	
Unbearable Memories	不堪回首	Qiu Qixiang	Ding Ziming; Li Pingqian	Drama	
Variations	情弦變音記	Chen Zhizhen	Wang Huixian; Wang Hanhui	Drama	
Who is the Mother	誰是母親	Gu Wuwei	Gu Wuwei; Gu Baolian	Drama	Based on Le Fils Naturel by Alexandre Dumas, fils
Yanghua's Hate	楊花恨	Shi Dongshan	Han Yunzhen; Wang Naidong		Alternate title: Catkins
The Young Factory Owner	小廠主	Lu Jie	Li Minghui; Wang Yuanlong	Drama	
The Young Gentleman		Dan Duyu	Dan Erchun; He Rongzhu	Drama	Adapted from Little Lord Fauntleroy by Frances Hodgson Burnett
Young Master Feng	馮大少爺	Hong Shen			Alternate title: The Playboy
1926
A Couple's Secret	夫妻之秘密	Shao Zuiweng	Hu Die		
A Lovelorn Actress	多情的女伶	Zhang Shichuan	Xuan Jinglin; Zhu Fei	Drama	
Better Go Home	不如歸	Yang Xiaozhong	Wang Fuqing	War	Adapted from a novel by Tokutomi Roka
Family Heirloom	傳家寶	Dan Duyu	Yin Mingzhu; He Rongzhu	Mystery	
Hell and Heaven	地獄天堂	Gu Wuwei	Gu Wuwei		
Lady Meng Jiang	孟姜女	Shao Zuiweng	Hu Die		Dramatization of a famous folk tale
Live on Love	同居之愛	Shi Dongshan			
Love and Gold	愛情與黃金	Zhang Shichuan; Hong Shen	Ding Ziming; Hong Shen	Drama	
The Love Freak	情場怪人	Ma-Xu Weibang			Alternate title: Monster in Love.
The Lucky Dolt	呆中福	Zhu Shouju	Xing Haha	Comedy	One of Chinese cinema's first full-length comedies, adapted from a Kunqu opera
Midnight Lovers	半夜情人	Xia Chifeng	Chen Qiufeng	Drama	
Moral Principles	道義之交	Liu Shen	Ding Ziming	Drama	
Mother's Happiness	兒孫福	Shi Dongshan	Zhou Wenzhu	Drama	
Movie Actresses	電影女明星	Shao Zuiweng	Hu Die; Wang Hanlun; Wu Suxin	Drama	
Orchid in an Empty Valley	空谷蘭	Zhang Shichuan	Zhang Zhiyun, Yang Naimei, Zhu Fei	Drama	Released in two parts. Based on the 1900 Japanese novel "No no Hana" (Wildflower) by Kuroiwa Ruikō.
The Pearl Pagoda	珍珠塔	Shao Zuiweng	Hu Die	Romance	Adapted from a classic Qing dynasty novel
The Prostitute's Son	倡門之子	Chen Kengran	Zheng Yisheng; Xu Qinfang	Drama	
The Rich Man's Daughter	富人之女	Zhang Shichuan	Xuan Jinglin	Drama	
Seizing a National Treasure	奪國寶	Zhang Huichong	Zhang Huichong; Xu Su'e	Action	
The Shadow on the Window	窗前足影	Fu Zhuoqun	Lu Jianfen		
Three Girls in Shanghai	上海三女子	Ren Yiping	Yang Naimei; Han Yunzhen; Jiang Naifang		Alternate title: Shanghai Three Women
Uproar in the Studio	大鬧畫室	Wan brothers		Animation	First Chinese animated short
White Snake	白蛇傳	Shao Zuiweng	Hu Die; Wu Suxin	Action/Fantasy	Tianyi Film Company production and a significant overseas success in Southeast Asia
Why Not Her?	玉潔冰清	Bu Wancang	Zhang Zhiyun	Drama	
The Worker's Wife	工人之妻	Ren Pengnian	Ren Aizhu	Romance	
1927
A Beauty of 16	二八佳人	Zheng Zhengqiu	Ding Ziming	Drama	
Country of Women	女兒國	Qiu Qixiang; Li Pingqian	Hu Die		Based on a section of Journey to the West
A Couple in Name	挂名的夫妻	Bu Wancang	Ruan Lingyu		Mingxing Film Company production. Ruan Lingyu's movie debut.
Arrow of Hatred	一仇箭	Yang Xiaozhong	Yang Aili	Action	Based on a story in Water Margin
At the End of Her Rope	浪女窮途	Mei Xueshou	Yang Aili	Drama	
White Hibiscus	白芙蓉	Chen Tian	Zhang Huimin; Wu Suxin	Action/Romance	
The Beauty Trap	美人計	Zhu Shouju, et al.	Zhang Zhiyun		Based on two chapters in Romance of the Three Kingdoms
The Cape Poet	海角詩人	Hou Yao	Li Dandan; Hou Yao; Lim Cho Cho	Drama	
The Cave of the Silken Web	盤絲洞	Dan Duyu	Yin Mingzhu	Silent. Shenmo	Thought to be lost. Rediscovered in 2013.
Dream of the Red Chamber	紅樓夢	Ren Pengnian	Lu Jianfen; Wen Yimin	Drama	
Fallen Plum Blossoms	梅花落	Zhang Shichuan; Zheng Zhengqiu	Zhang Zhiyun; Xuan Jinglin	Drama	Released in three parts
The Flirting Scholar	唐伯虎點秋香	Shao Zuiweng; Qiu Qixiang	Chen Yumei; Lin Yongrong	Comedy	
For Her Father's Sake	為親犧牲	Zhang Shichuan	Zhang Zhiyuan	Drama	
General Xue Conquers the West	薛仁貴征西	Gu Wuwei	Lu Cuilan; Li Guifang	Action	Released in two parts
The Hero with White-Haired Legs	大俠白毛腿	Qiu Qixiang	Hu Die		
Heroic Son and Daughter	兒女英雄	Wen Yimin	Wen Yimin; Fan Xuepeng	Action	First of a five-part series
The Industrial Magnate	實業大王	Hong Ji; Zhou Kongkong	Tang Mali	Drama	Adapted from Les Misérables
Legendary Luminous Pearl	夜明珠	Chen Tian	Zhang Huimin; Wu Suxin	Action/Crime	
Ma Yongzhen of Shandong	山東馬永貞	Zhang Shichuan	Zhang Huichong; Gong Jianong	Action	Remade in 1972 as Boxer from Shantung
Magnificent Destiny	華麗緣	Chen Tian	Lu Jianfen; Fan Xuepeng	Action	Alternate title: Reunited
The Monkey King's Struggles in the Kingdom of Chechi	車遲國唐僧斗法	Zhang Shichuan	Zheng Xiaoqiu		Adapted from Journey to the West
Mutual Competition	桃李爭春	Wang Yuanlong	Zhou Wenzhu	Romantic Comedy	
The Old Man in the Moon Divorces	月老離婚	Hou Yao	Zhou Kongkong	Romantic Comedy	
Pitiful Qiuxiang	可憐的秋香	Wang Yuanlong	Li Minghui	Romance	
Princess Iron Fan	鐵扇公主	Li Pingqian	Hu Die; Chen Yumei		Based on the novel Journey to the West
Real and False Daughters	真假千金	Zhang Shichuan	Xuan Jinglin; Zheng Xiaoqiu		
Rebuild the Republic	再造共和	Xia Chifeng	Chen Qiufeng	War	
Reciprocity	俠鳳奇緣	Zhang Shichuan	Yang Naimei		
Redressing a Grievance	烏盆記	Zhu Shouju		Crime	First film made about real-life Chinese magistrate Judge Bao
Resurrected Rose	復活的玫瑰	Li Minwei	Lim Cho Cho; Li Minwei	Drama	
Romance of the Western Chamber	西廂記	Hou Yao			Adaption of the classic Chinese dramatic work by Wang Shifu
Seeking Love on the Field of Romance		Cheng Bugao	Han Yunzhen	Drama	
Shandong Bandits	山東響馬	Qian Xuefan	Zheng Chaofan; Xu Qinfang	Action	
Spring Dream by the Lake	湖邊春夢	Bu Wancang	Gong Jianong; Yang Naimei	Drama	
Tablet of Blood and Tears	血淚碑	Zheng Zhengqiu	Ding Ziming; Ruan Lingyu	Tragedy	
Tian Qilang	田七郎	Zhang Shichuan	Zhang Huichong		
The Wandering Songstress	天涯歌女	Ouyang Yuqian	Li Dandan	Tragedy	
The Woman Lawyer	女律師	Qiu Qixiang	Hu Die	Drama	Adapted from The Merchant of Venice
Yang Guifei	楊貴妃	Dan Duyu	He Rongzhu	Drama	Story of legendary imperial concubine Yang Guifei
1928
A Complicated Plot	柳暗花明	Lu Jie	Li Minghui; Zhou Wenzhu; Chen Yishang	Drama	Released in two parts
A Luminous Pearl	夜光珠	Shao Zuiweng	Chen Yumei	Crime	
A Shanghai Dance Hostess	上海一舞女	Wang Cilong	Zhou Wenzhu; Wang Naidong	Drama	
A Stressful Wedding	奮斗的婚姻	Cheng Bugao	Hu Die; Zheng Xiaoqiu		
A Traveler's Strange Tale	海外奇緣	Chen Tian	Wu Suxin; Zhang Huimin	Action/Adventure	
A Young Detective	小偵探	Bu Wancang	Gao Zhanfei	Crime	
An Ardent Couple	熱血鴛鴦	Jiang Qifeng	Tang Tianxiu	Romance	
Ashes of the Lotus	美人關	Bu Wancang	Xiao Ying; Yang Naimei	War	
The Beloved	意中人	Wan Laitian	Li Minghui; Wan Laitian; Sun Min	Romance	
Burning of the Red Lotus Temple	火燒紅蓮寺	Zheng Zhengqiu (pt.1); Zhang Shichuan (pts.2-19)	Zheng Xiaoqiu; Xia Peizhen; Hu Die	Action	19 parts, adapted from a martial arts novel by Pingjiang Buxiaosheng
Dream of the Red Chamber	紅樓夢	Cheng Shuren	Xia Peizhen; Yin Mingzhu	Drama	
Evil's Shadow	妖光俠影	Yang Xiaozhong	Yang Aili	Action	Adapted from a section of Journey to the West
Fabulous Swordsman	荒唐劍客	Wang Yuanlong	Wang Yuanlong; Tang Tianxiu	Action	
Five Avenging Women	五女復仇	Gao Xiping	Lim Cho Cho; Li Dandan; Yan Shanshan	Crime	
The Flying Hero	航空大俠	Chen Tian	Zhang Huimin; Wu Suxin	Action/Adventure	
The Flying Shoes	飛行鞋	Pan Chuitong			Adapted from a German children's story
Four Heroes of the Wang Family	王氏四俠	Shi Dongshan	Wang Yuanlong	Action	
The Girl Detective	女偵探	Zhang Shichuan	Hu Die	Crime	
The Great Swordsman's Revenge	大俠復仇記	Zhang Shichuan	Xiao Ying; Hu Die	Action	Remade in Hong Kong in 1949
Guanyin Receives the Way	觀音得道		Lim Cho Cho; Li Dandan		The Miao Shan legend version of Guanyin
He and She	江湖情俠	Wen Yimin	Fan Xuepeng; Wen Yimin	Action	Alternate title: "Jianghu Lovers"
Heritage of Trouble	泣荊花	Zhu Shaoquan	Fan Xuepeng; Wen Yimin		
Hero Gan Fengchi	大俠甘風池	Yang Xiaozhong	Wang Guiling; Yang Aili	Action	
The Heroine in Black	黑衣女俠	Zheng Zhengqiu; Cheng Bugao	Ding Ziming; Zheng Xiaoqiu	Action	
The Heroine Saves a Lady	侠女救夫人	Zheng Zhengqiu	Hu Die	Action	
Imperial Concubine Yang of Beijing	北京楊貴妃	Zheng Zhengqiu	Yang Naimei; Ruan Lingyu	Drama	The Yang Guifei story, retold in a modern setting
It's Me	就是我	Zhu Shouju	Wang Naidong; Tang Tianxiu	Crime	
Kick	一腳踢出去	Zhang Shichuan; Hong Shen	Ding Ziming; Gong Jianong	Romance	First Chinese film having sports as a background. Alternate title: "Classmates' Romance"
The King of Money	金錢之王	Jiang Qifeng	Zhou Wenzhu	Crime	
Luoyang Bridge	蔡狀元建造洛陽橋	Zhang Shichuan	Zhu Fei; Ruan Lingyu		Adapted from the classical opera "Number One Scholar Cai Builds the Luoyang Bridge", the story of early structural engineer Cai Xiang
Ma Zhenhua	馬振華	Zhu Shouju; Wang Cilong	Zhou Wenzhu; Wang Cilong	Drama	
Marriage for Peace	二度梅	Zhu Shouju		Historical Drama	
The Mountain of Fire		Yang Xiaozhong	Yang Aili; Wang Guilin		
Mulan Joins the Army	木蘭從軍	Hou Yao	Li Dandan	War	
My Love Became My Stepmother		Wang Yuanlong	Tan Xuerong; Wang Yuanlong		
Northeast China Hero		Ren Pengnian		Action	
Patriotic Souls	愛國魂	Zheng Jiduo	Zheng Jiduo; Tang Tianxiu	Drama	One of China's first "Resistance films", urging opposition to Japanese encroachment on Chinese territory.
Reviving Romance	在世姻緣	Gao Xiping	Lim Cho Cho; Li Dandan; Yan Shanshan	Drama	
Robin Hood	盧鬢花	Dan Duyu	Dan Erchun; He Rongzhu	Action	Story of the legendary folk hero, transplanted to China. Alternate title: "The Small Swordsman" (小劍客)
Robin Hood Wipes Out the Monster	盧鬢花 (續集)	Dan Duyu	Dan Erchun; He Rongzhu	Action	Sequel. Alternate title: "The Towering Demon" (萬丈魔)
Romance on the Battlefield	戰地情天	Li Minwei; Pan Chuitong		War/Romance	
Secret History of the Qing Court	清宮秘史	Wang Cilong	Zhou Wenzhu; Wang Cilong	Historical Drama	
Shadows in the Imperial Palace	古宮魔影	Jiang Qifeng	Zhou Wenzhu; Chen Yitang		Adapted from an episode in Journey to the West
She Wants to be Free	花國大總統	Zhang Weishou	Yang Naimei		
Silver Gun Bandit	銀槍盜	Wang Yuanlong	Wang Yuanlong; Zhou Wenzhu	Crime	Alternate title: "Who But Myself Can Do It?"
The Spider Gang	蜘蛛黨	Mei Xuechou	Sun Min	Crime	
Strange Knight	漁叉怪俠	Sun Yu	Sun Min; Yan Yuexian	Action	
Strange Lady	奇女子	Shi Dongshan	Yang Naimei; Zhu Fei; Gao Zhanfei		
The True and False Monkey King	真假孫行者	Li Zeyuan			Adapted from a section of Journey to the West
Two Swords	雙劍俠	Chen Kengran	Xu Qinfang	Action	
The Tyrant Huang Tian Takes a Wife	黃天霸招親	Lei Yutian	Han Yuqing; Wang Guiling	Drama	
White Cloud Pagoda	白雲塔	Zheng Zhengqiu	Zheng Xiaoqiu; Hu Die; Ruan Lingyu	Drama	Released in two parts
Wu Song Sheds Blood in Mandarin Duck Tower	武鬆血濺鴛鴦樓	Yang Xiaozhong	Wang Zhengqing	Action	Based on a story in Water Margin
The Young Mistress's Fan	少奶奶的扇子	Hong Shen, Zhang Shichuan	Xuan Jinglin		Adapted from Lady Windermere's Fan by Oscar Wilde
1929
A Clever Fool	聰明笨伯	Mei Xuechou	Xu Xizhen	Comedy	
A Duel of Swordsmen	雙雄斗劍	Shi Dongshan	Gao Zhanfei; Ma-Xu Weibang; Hu Shan	Action	
A Girl Bandit	女盜蘭姑娘	Zhang Huimin	Wu Suxin; Zhang Huimin	Crime/Action	
A Roving Hero	理想中的英雄	Hu Zongli	Hu Zongli	Action/Adventure	
A Strange Hero Saves the Nation	奇俠救國記	Wang Cilong	Wang Yuanlong; Tang Tianxiu	Action/Romance	
A Woman's Heart	情欲寶鑑	Li Pingqian	Ruan Lingyu	Drama	
After the Robbery	劫后孤鴻	Li Pingqian	Ruan Lingyu; Li Pingqian	Tragedy	
Revenge of an Actress	女伶復仇記	Bu Wancang	Wang Hanlun; Gao Zhanfei	Drama	Alternate title: Blind Love
An Adopted Daughter	塵海奇俠	Zhang Huimin	Wu Suxin; Zhang Huimin	Action/Romance	
An Orphan	雪中孤雛	Zhang Huimin	Wu Suxin; Zhang Huimin	Drama/Action	
Beauty Under the Blade	刀下美人	Zheng Zhengqiu	Han Yunzhen; Zhu Fei	Drama	
Blood of the Lovers	愛人的血	Cheng Bugao	Hu Die; Zheng Xiaoqiu	Drama	
Black Cat	黑貓	Wang Yuanlong	Wang Yuanlong; Zhang Meiyu	Action	
Burning of Seven Star Mansion	火燒七星樓	Yu Boan	Qian Siying	Action	First of a five-part series, released 1929-30.
The Candy Beauty	糖美人	Chen Baoqi	Yuan Congmei	Drama	
The Camel King	駱駝王	Wang Yuanlong	Tang Tianxiu; Wang Yuanlong		
Detective No.55	五十五號偵探	Wang Yuanlong	Wang Yuanlong; Tang Tianxiu	Crime	
The Detective's Wife	偵探之妻	Zhang Huimin	Wu Suxin; Zhang Huimin	Crime	
The Devil Incarnate	混世魔王	Ma-Xu Weibang	Ma-Xu Weibang	Horror	
The Diamond Case	金剛鑽	Dan Duyu	Yin Mingzhu; Dan Erchun	Adventure	
Divorce	離婚	Cheng Bugao	Gong Jianong; Hu Die; Zheng Xiaoqiu	Drama	Adapted from the novel of the same name by Lao She. Remade in 1992.
Done With One Heart	同心劫	Bu Wancang	Ding Ziming		
Encounter in a Poor Village		Zhang Feifan	Yan Yuexian; Yang Aili	Action/Romance	
Escape From the Tiger's Mouth	虎口余生	Zhu Shaochuan	Fan Xuepeng; Shang Guanwu	Action	
Fabulous General	荒唐將軍	Shi Dongshan	Chen Yumei; Gao Zhanfei	Action	Alternate title: The River Hero Stabs the Tiger
Flower of the Silver Screen	銀幕之花	Zheng Jiduo	Ruan Lingyu; Zheng Jiduo	Tragedy	
Flying Heroine Lü Sanniang	飛俠呂三娘	Yang Xiaozhong	Tang Tianxiu	Action	
Four Heroes of the Wang Family, II	王氏四俠 (續集)	Wang Yuanlong	Wang Yuanlong; Jin Yan	Action	Sequel to the 1928 film of the same title
The Greatest Hero	無敵英雄	Shao Zuiweng	Zhang Huichong; Xu Sue; Gao Zhanfei	Action	
The Head Lost at Midnight	半夜飛頭記	Jiang Qifeng	Tang Tianxiu	Action	
Hero in the Flames	火裡英雄	Zhang Huimin	Wu Suxin; Zhang Huimin	Action	Alternate title: Fireman
Heroine in Red	紅俠	Wen Yimin	Fan Xuepeng; Wen Yimin	Action	
Hot-Blooded Man	熱血男兒	Wan Laitian	Wan Laitian; Yang Aili; Gao Zhanfei	Romance	Alternate title: Her Love
Don't Change Your Husband	情海重吻	Xie Yunqing	Tang Tianxiu; Chen Yitang		
The Life of the Rich	富人的生活	Cheng Bugao	Hu Die; Zhu Fei	Drama	
Miscarriage of Justice		Wang Yuanlong	Wang Yuanlong; Tang Tianxiu		Alternate title: The Frame-Up
My Son Was a Hero	兒子英雄	Yang Xiaozhong	Liu Jiqun	Action/Adventure	Alternate title: Poor Daddy. Oldest surviving full-length Chinese film.
Nights of Terror	恐怖之夜	Zhang Huimin	Wu Suxin; Zhang Huimin	Suspense	
Papa Loves Mama	爸爸愛媽媽	Cheng Bugao	Hu Die; Xia Peizhen; Gong Jianong	Drama	
Passion's Precious Mirror		Li Pingqian	Ruan Lingyu; Zheng Jiduo	Drama	
Petty Tyrant Zhang Chong	小霸王張沖	Zhang Huichong	Xu Sue; Zhang Huichong		Released in two parts
Pirates	海上霸王	Li Shaohua	Xu Xuzhen	Action	
Repentance	懺悔	Zhang Shichuan	Gong Jianong; Han Yunzhen; Zhu Fei	Drama	
Romantic Swordsman	風流劍客	Sun Yu	Gao Qianping; Jin Yan	Action/Romance	Alternate title: The Rose and the Lady. (薔薇與美人) First lead role for Jin Yan, 1930s matinee idol.
Secret Anguish	隱痛	Chen Kengran			
Sister I Love You	妹妹我愛你	Dan Duyu	Yin Mingzhu; Dan Erchun	Comedy	
Strange Hero in a Desolate Village	荒村怪俠	Zhang Huimin	Wu Suxin; Zhang Huimin	Action	
Tears and Flowers	血淚黃花	Zheng Zhengqiu; Cheng Bugao	Hu Die; Gong Jianong; Xia Peizhen		Released in two parts. Alternate title: Huang Lu's Romance
Under the Iron Heel	鐵蹄下	Wang Yuanlong	Wang Yuanlong		Alternate title: In Hell
White Mouse		Wang Yuanlong	Wang Yuanlong; Tang Tianxiu		
Who Is the Thief?		Wang Cilong	Tang Tianxiu; Wang Zhengxin		
Women Pirates	女海盜	Zheng Jiduo	Lin Meiru; Zheng Jiduo		
Young Compatriots on the Battlefield	戰地小同胞	Zheng Zhengqiu	Zheng Xiaoqiu; Gao Qianping		
Young Hero Liu Jin	小英雄劉進	Cheng Bugao	Zheng Xiaoqiu	Action	

== Mainland Chinese film production totals ==
Year	Total Films
1905	2
1906	3
1907	2
1908	1
1913	13
1916	1
1919	1
1920	4
1921	12
1922	7
1923	11
1924	14
1925	59
1926	106
1927	113
1928	95
1929	118

== See also ==
- Cinema of China
- Best 100 Chinese Motion Pictures as chosen by the 24th Hong Kong Film Awards

== Sources ==
中国影片大典 Encyclopaedia of Chinese Films. 1905-1930, 故事片·戏曲片. (1996). Zhong guo ying pian da dian: 1905-1930. Beijing: 中国电影出版社 China Movie Publishing House. ISBN 7-106-01155-X
