= List of lost Chinese films =

This is a list of lost Chinese films. It is divided into silent films and sound films. The films listed here range from 1905 to 1953.

== Silent films ==
Year	Film	Director	Note
1905	Dingjun Mountain	Ren Qingtai	The first Chinese film
1909	Stealing the Roast Duck (Chinese: 偷烧鸭)	Liang Shaopo	Hong Kong's first film
1913	The Difficult Couple	Zhang Shichuan, Zheng Zhengqiu	The earliest Chinese feature film
1916	Victims of Opium (Chinese: 黑籍冤魂)	Zhang Shichuan, Guan Haifeng	
1921	Yan Ruisheng (Chinese: 阎瑞生)	Ren Pengnian	
1921	Swear By God (Chinese: 海誓)	Dan Duyu	
1922	Naughty Boy (Chinese: 顽童)	Dan Duyu	
1922	The Lady Killer (Chinese: 红粉骷髅)	Guan Haifeng	
1922	The King of Comedy Visits Shanghai (Chinese: 滑稽大王遊滬記)	Zhang Shichuan	
1922	A Lotus Rhyme (Chinese: 莲花落)	Ren Pengnian	
1922	Good Brothers (Chinese: 好兄弟)	Ren Pengnian	
1923	Patriotic Umbrella (Chinese: 爱国伞)	Ren Pengnian	
1923	Orphan Rescues Grandfather (Chinese: 孤儿救祖记)	Zhang Shichuan	
1923	Abandoned One (Chinese: 弃儿)	Dan Duyu	
1923	The Widow Wants to Remarry (Chinese: 古井重波记)	Dan Duyu	
1923	Zhang Xinsheng (Chinese: 張欣生)	Zhang Shichuan	Crime film, based on a real-life murder
1924	Little Brother (Chinese: 弟弟)	Dan Duyu	
1924	Sins (Chinese: 孽海潮)	Chen Shouyin	
1924	Human Heart (Chinese: 人心)	Chen Shouyin	
1924	A Smart Cop (Chinese: 糊涂警察)	Zhang Huichong, Chen Shouyin	
1924	5 Minutes (Chinese: 五分钟)	Zhang Huichong	
1924	The Truth (Chinese: 水落石出)	Zhang Huichong, Xu Wenrong	
1924	The Tea-Picking Girl|(Chinese: 采茶女)	Xu Hu	
1924	The Death of Yuli (Chinese: 玉梨魂)	Zhang Shichuan, Xu Hu	
1924	Divorcee (Chinese: 弃妇)	Li Zeyuan, Hou Yao	
1925	Zhai Xing Zhi Nu (Chinese: 摘星之女)	Li Zeyuan, Mei Xuechou	
1925	The Lover's Dream (Chinese: 春闺梦里人)	Li Zeyuan, Mei Xuechou	
1925	Cupid's Puppets (Chinese: 爱神的玩偶)	Hou Zhai, Mei Xuechou	
1925	Heroine Li Feifei (Chinese: 女俠李飛飛)	Runje Shaw	
1925	The Dream of Women (Chinese: 南华梦)	Zhang Puyi	
1925	Tears In The Fall (Chinese: 秋声泪影)	Jiang Lvying	
1925	A Peach Bloom in Human Shape (Chinese: 人面桃花)	Chen Shouyin	
1925	Unbearable Memories (Chinese: 不堪回首)	Qiu Qixiang	
1925	Out of the Hell (Chinese: 劫后缘)	Zhang Huichong	Only 3 minutes survived
1925	The Stormy Night	Zhu Shouju	Partially resurfaced
1925	The Lover Is Not a Former One (Chinese: 前情)	Zhu Shouju	
1925	Next Door Girl (Chinese: 邻家女)	Dan Duyu	
1925	The Young Gentleman (Chinese: 小公子)	Dan Duyu	
1925	Who's His Mother?(Chinese: 谁是母亲)	Gu Wuwei	
1925	Yang Hua Hen (Chinese: 杨花恨)	Shi Dongshan	
1925	Wu Sa hu Chao (Chinese: 五卅沪潮)	Chen Kengran	
1925	Complaints (Chinese: 秋扇怨)	Chen Kengran	
1925	True Love (Chinese: 真爱)	Chen Tian	
1925	Stepmother's Tears (Chinese: 后母泪)	Ren Pengnian	
1925	The Student's Hard Life (Chinese: 苦学生)	Guan Haifeng	
1925	New Family (Chinese: 新人的家庭)	Ren Qinping	
1925	Lee Fee-Fee the Heroine (Chinese: 女侠李飞飞)	Shao Zuiweng	
1925	Repentance (Chinese: 立地成佛)	Shao Zuiweng	
1926	Zhong Xiao Jie Yi (Chinese: 忠孝节义)	Shao Zuiweng	
1926	Lonely Orchid (Chinese: 空谷蘭)	Zhang Shichuan	
1926	The Lovers (Chinese: 梁祝痛史)	Shao Zuiweng	
1926	The White Snake (Chinese: 白蛇传)	Shao Zuiweng	
1926	The Pearl Pagoda (Chinese: 珍珠塔)	Shao Zuiweng	
1926	Hell and Heaven (Chinese: 地狱天堂)	Gu Wuwei	
1926	Freedom of Marriage (Chinese: 逃婚)	Xia Chifeng	
1926	The Lost Hero (Chinese: 失意的英雄)	Xia Chifeng	
1926	Midnight Lovers (Chinese: 半夜情人)	Xia Chifeng	
1926	As Their Wishes (Chinese: 奇峰突出)	Xu Wenrong	
1926	Embarrassing Sister (Chinese: 难为了妹妹)	Li Pingqian	
1926	Ku Le Yuan Yang (Chinese: 苦乐鸳鸯)	Li ZeYuan, Liu Zhaoming	
1926	Country Girl (Chinese: 乡姑娘)	Liu Zhaoming	
1926	Qing Tian Zhong Bu (Chinese: 情天终补)	Li ZeYuan, Liu Zhaoming	
1926	The Lucky Dolt (Chinese: 呆中福)	Zhu Shouju	
1926	Debt Circles (Chinese: 连环债)	Zhu Shouju	
1926	One Day Rest (Chinese: 休息一天)	Zhu Shouju	
1926	Ma Jiefu (Chinese: 马介甫)	Zhu Shouju	
1926	Family Heirloom (Chinese: 传家宝)	Dan Duyu	
1926	Naughty Butterfly (Chinese: 浪蝶)	Kok-Sin Sit	
1926	Chang Men Zhi Zi (Chinese: 倡门之子)	Chen Kengran	
1926	Mother's Happiness	Shi Dongshan	Incomplete
1926	Live on Love (Chinese: Live on Love)	Shi Dongshan	
1926	Workman's Wife (Chinese: 工人之妻)	Ren Pengnian	
1926	The Tale of Lijing (Chinese: 荔镜传)	Ren Pengnian, Wen Yimin	
1926	A Lottery Ticket (Chinese: 呆运)	Chen Tian	
1926	Parenthood (Chinese: 可怜天下父母心)	Gu Kenfu	
1926	The Night in Shanghai (Chinese: 上海之夜)	Gu Kenfu	
1926	Fair Door (Chinese: 公平之门)	Gu Kenfu	
1926	Monkey King Conquers the Leopard (Chinese: 孙行者大战金钱豹)	Shao Zuiweng, Gu Kenfu	
1926	Tang Bohu Marrying Qiuxiang (Chinese: 唐伯虎点秋香)	Shao Zuiweng, Qiu Qixiang	
1926	Meng Jiang Nü(Chinese: 孟姜女)	Shao Zuiweng, Qiu Qixiang	
1926	The Movie Star (Chinese: 电影女明星)	Shao Zuiweng	
1926	Secrets Between Husband and Wife (Chinese: 夫妻之秘密)	Shao Zuiweng	
1926	Love's Sacrifice (Chinese: 孔雀东南飞)	Cheng Shuren	
1926	Three Girls In Shanghai (Chinese: 上海三女子)	Ren Qinping	
1926	The Unknown Hero (Chinese: 无名英雄)	Zhang Shichuan	
1927	The Song of Plum Blossom I (Chinese: 梅花落（上集）)	Zhang Shichuan, Zheng Zhengqiu	
1927	The Song of Plum Blossom II (Chinese: 梅花落（中集）)	Zhang Shichuan, Zheng Zhengqiu	
1927	The Song of Plum Blossom III (Chinese: 梅花落（下集）)	Zhang Shichuan, Zheng Zhengqiu	
1927	Water Heroes II (Chinese: 水上英雄 前部)	Zhang Huichong	
1927	Water Heroes II (Chinese: 水上英雄 后部)	Zhang Huichong	
1927	Good Son (Chinese: 好儿子)	Li Pingqian, Gu Kenfu	
1927	Gods of Honour:Jiang Ziya (Chinese: 封神榜之姜子牙火烧琵琶精)	Xia Chifeng	
1927	Gods of Honour:Yang Jian (Chinese: 封神榜之杨戬梅山收七怪)	Xia Chifeng	
1927	Three Kingdom:Cao Cao (Chinese: 三国志之曹操逼宫)	Xia Chifeng	
1927	Republic Again (Chinese: 再造共和)	Xia Chifeng	
1927	Han Xiangzi (Chinese: 韩湘子)	Xia Chifeng	
1927	What A Relationship (Chinese: 如此恋爱)	Jiang Qifeng	
1927	Tie Xue Hong Yan (Chinese: 铁血红颜)	Xu Wenrong	
1927	Brother's Encounter (Chinese: 哥哥的艳福)	Xu Wenrong	
1927	Hong Niang Xian Xing Ji (Chinese: 红娘现形记)	Xu Wenrong	
1927	The Adventure of Modern Woman (Chinese: 摩登女子历险记)	Min Dezhang	
1927	A Prostitute's Wish (Chinese: 卖油郎独占花魁女)	Wan Laitian	
1927	Liu Guan Zhang Da Po Huang Jin (Chinese: 刘关张大破黄巾)	Shao Zuiweng	
1927	WAILS TO PAGODA (Chinese: 仕林祭塔)	Shao Zuiweng, Li Pingqian	
1927	Song Jiang (Chinese: 宋江)	Qiu Qixiang	
1927	Sword Nerve, Soft Heart (Chinese: 剑胆琴心)	Chen Tian	
1927	A Letter Sent Back (Chinese: 一封书信寄回来)	Mei Xuetao	Animation, short
1927	Naughty Girl's Fate (Chinese: 浪女穷途)	Liu Zhaoming, Mei Xuetao	
1927	Sex-Trap (Chinese: 美人计)	Lu Jie, Zhu Shouju, Shi Dongshan, Wang Yuanlong	
1927	Redress a Grievance (Chinese: 乌盆记)	Zhu Shouju	
1927	The Cave of the Silken Web (Chinese: 盘丝洞)	Dan Duyu	Rediscovered later
1927	Gua ming de fu qi (Chinese: 挂名的夫妻)	Bu Wancang	
1927	The Tablet of Blood and Tears (Chinese: 血泪碑)	Zheng Zhengqiu	
1927	Beijing Yang Guifei (Chinese: 北京杨贵妃)	Zheng Zhengqiu	
1927	Zhu Bajie: Battle on the Liusha River (Chinese: 猪八戒大闹流沙河)	Hong Ji	
1927	Shandong Thief (Chinese: 山东响马)	Chen Tian	
1927	Tong Shi Cao Ge (Chinese: 同室操戈)	Chen Tian	
1927	Romance Slave (Chinese: 情奴)	Chen Tian	
1927	Hua Li Yuan (Chinese: 华丽缘)	Chen Tian, Ren Pengshou	
1927	White Hibiscus (Chinese: 白芙蓉)	Chen Tian	
1927	Stranger from Cruise (Chinese: 海上客)	Qian Xuefan	
1927	Naughty Dream (Chinese: 风流梦)	Qian Xuefan	
1927	Red Butterfly (Chinese: 女侠红蝴蝶)	Qian Xuefan	
1927	The Female Lawyer (Chinese: 女律师)	Qiu Qixiang	
1927	The Picture of the Eight Beauties of Jiaxing (Chinese: 嘉兴八美图)	Lu Hanping, Ren Pengnian, Yue-Tin Yam	
1927	The Picture of the Eight Beauties of Jiaxing II (Chinese: 嘉兴八美图 第二集)	Lu Hanping, Ren Pengnian	
1927	The Picture of the Eight Beauties of Jiaxing III (Chinese: 嘉兴八美图 第三集)	Lu Hanping, Yue-Tin Yam	
1927	The Dream of Red Mansions (Chinese: 红楼梦)	Ren Pengnian, Yu Boyan	
1927	Ma Yongzhen From Shantung (Chinese: 山东马永贞)	Zhang Shichuan	
1927	The Hunter's Legend (Chinese: 田七郎)	Zhang Shichuan	
1928	The Good Man Zhang Chong I (Chinese: 小霸王张冲 上集)	Zhang Huichong	
1928	The Good Man Zhang Chong II (Chinese: 小霸王张冲 下集)	Zhang Huichong	
1928	The King of Money (Chinese: 金钱之王)	Jiang QiFeng	
1928	Miner And the Boss' sister (Chinese: 热血鸳鸯)	Jiang QiFeng	
1928	Daughter Kingdom (Chinese: 女儿国)	Li Pingqian, Qiu Qixiang	
1928	The Taiping Kingdom (Chinese: 太平天国)	Xia Chifeng	
1928	The Weird Lady (Chinese: 怪女郎)	Chen Shouyin	
1928	The Regret of a Golden Dream (Chinese: 金缕恨)	Chen Shouyin	
1928	Strange Girl (Chinese: 奇女子)	Shi Dongshan	
1928	The Young Mistress' Fan (Chinese: 少奶奶的扇子)	Hong Shen, Zhang Shichuan	
1928	Zhao Jun Chu Sai (Chinese: 昭君出塞)	Guan Haifeng	
1928	The Flying Man (Chinese: The Flying Man)	Chen Tian	
1928	The Tiger and a Maid (Chinese: 猛虎劫美记)	Chen Tian	
1928	The True Monkey King (Chinese: 真假孙行者)	Li Zeyuan	
1928	Birth of Nezha (Chinese: 哪吒出世)	Li Zeyuan	
1928	Yu Cha Guai Xia (Chinese: 渔叉怪侠)	Sun Yu	
1928	Little Detective (Chinese: 小侦探)	Bu Wancang	
1928	Honey-Sweet Brother (Chinese: 多情的哥哥)	Ren Qinping	
1928	Spider Gang (Chinese: 蜘蛛党)	Mei Xuechou	
1928	Attacking Gaotang Prefecture (Chinese: 大破高唐州)	Zhu Shouju	
1928	Ma Zhenhua (Chinese: 马振华)	Zhu Shouju	
1928	That Is Me (Chinese: 就是我)	Zhu Shouju	
1928	Marriage for Peace (Chinese: 二度梅)	Zhu Shouju	
1928	Shadows in the Old Palace (Chinese: 古宫魔影)	Jiang Qifeng	
1928	Little Sword Man (Chinese: 小剑客)	Dan Duyu	
1928	The Evil Man (Chinese: 万丈魔)	Dan Duyu	
1928	The Warrior with a Double Sword (Chinese: 双剑侠)	Chen Kengran	
1928	The Heroine in Black (Chinese: 黑衣女侠)	Cheng Bugao, Zheng Zhengqiu	
1928	The White Cloud Pagada (Chinese: 白云塔)	Zhang Shichuan; Zheng Zhengqiu	
1928	The Luoyang Bridge (Chinese: 蔡状元建造洛阳桥)	Zhang Shichuan	
1928	Shi Shi Qi Yuan (Chinese: 石室奇冤)	Qian Xuefan	
1928	A Traveller's Tale (Chinese: 海外奇缘)	Chen Tian	
1928	Meet Fairies as Seeking Dad (Chinese: 寻父遇仙记)	Shao Zuiweng	
1928	A Luminous Pearl (Chinese: 夜光珠)	Shao Zuiweng	
1928	Boxer (Chinese: 拳大王)	Shao Zuiweng	
1928	Double Pearl and Phoenix (Chinese: 双珠凤（上))	Shao Zuiweng	
1929	Perfect Hero (Chinese: 理想中的英雄)	Hu Zongli	
1929	Piao Liu Xia (Chinese: 飘流侠)	Hu Zongli	
1929	Attack the Golden Snake Hills (Chinese: 大破金蟒山)	Hu Zongli	
1929	Fang Shiyu Takes A Challenge II (Chinese: 勇孝子)	Ren Qinping	
1929	Little Swordman (Chinese: 小侠客)	Ren Qinping	
1929	The Gan kids (Chinese: 甘氏两小侠)	Ren Qinping	
1929	The Gan kids:Sequel (Chinese: 甘氏两小侠)	Ren Qinping	Partial
1929	Two Dwarf (Chinese: 矮亲家)	Bu Wancang	
1929	Two Dwarf:Sequel (Chinese: 两矮争风)	Bu Wancang	
1929	Three Door Street (Chinese: 三门街)	Yu Boyan	
1929	Girl in Red Breaking into Golden Mountain Temple (Chinese: 红衣女大破金山寺)	Yu Boyan, Wen Yimin	
1929	Pink Building (Chinese: 粉妆楼第三集)	Yu Boyan	
1929	Pink Building (Chinese: 粉妆楼)	Yu Boyan	
1929	Burning Blue Dragon Temple (Chinese: 火烧青龙寺)	Ren Yutian	
1929	Rumpus at Wu Tai Shan (Chinese: 大闹五台山)	Ren Pengnian	
1929	Xue Di Zi (Chinese: 血滴子)	Jiang Qifeng	
1929	Hot Blood Man (Chinese: 热血男儿)	Wan Laiming	
1929	Fengyang Tiger (Chinese: 凤阳老虎)	Li Zeyuan, Guan Liyuan	
1929	The Giant's Nation (Chinese: 大人国)	Chen Kengran	
1929	Rose and Beauty (Chinese: 风流剑客)	Sun Yu	
1929	The Dumb Man Getting Smart (Chinese: 聪明笨伯)	Mei Xuetao	
1929	The Flying Robber (Chinese: 飞行大盗)	Dan Duyu	
1929	The Lady's Lover (Chinese: 侠女救夫人)	Zheng Zhengqiu	
1929	The Pearl Crown (Chinese: 珍珠冠)	Zhu Shouju	
1929	Warnings for the Lovers (Chinese: 情欲宝鉴)	Li Pingqian	
1929	Jie hou gu hong|(Chinese: 劫后孤鸿)	Li Pingqian	
1929	Burning Nine-Dragon Mountain (Chinese: 火烧九龙山)	Zhu Shouju	
1929	Breaking into Nine-Dragon Mountain (Chinese: 大破九龙山)	Zhu Shouju	
1929	Lady Nine-Flower (Chinese: 九花娘)	Zhu Shouju	
1929	Silver Screen Starlet (Chinese: 银幕之花)	Gi-tak Jeong	
1929	Women's Heart (Chinese: 妇人心)	Li Pingqian	
1929	Blind Love (Chinese: 女伶复仇记)	Bu Wancang	
1929	The Greatest Hero (Chinese: 无敌英雄)	Shao Zuiweng	
1929	The Romantic Heroine (Chinese: 浪漫女英雄)	Chen Tian	
1929	Seachore Hero (Chinese: 海滨豪杰)	Chen Tian, Zhu Xuhua	
1929	Yi Hai Qing Tian (Chinese: 义海情天)	Chen Tian	
1929	Blood of the Lovers (Chinese: 爱人的血)	Cheng Bugao	
1929	Qian long You Jiang Nan II (Chinese: 乾隆游江南第二集)	Shao Zuiweng	
1929	The Greatest Hero (Chinese: 无敌英雄)	Shao Zuiweng	
1929	Who is Thief?(Chinese: 谁是盗)	Wang Cilong	
1929	Four Wangs (Chinese: 王氏四侠续集)	Wang Yuanlong	
1929	Burning Seven - Stars Mansion I (Chinese: 火烧七星楼第一集)	Yu Boyan	
1929	Burning Seven - Stars Mansion II (Chinese: 火烧七星楼第二集)	Yu Boyan	
1929	The White Swallow (Chinese: 白燕女侠)	Yu Boyan	
1929	Rival Love (Chinese: 敌血情花)	Lu Hanping	
1929	Chinese Top Detective (Chinese: 中国第一大侦探)	Zhang Huichong	
1929	Head Lost At Midnight (Chinese: 半夜飞头记)	Zheng Yisheng, Jiang Qifeng	
1929	Qian long You Jiang Nan IV (Chinese: 乾隆游江南第四集)	Jiang Qifeng	
1930	Qian long You Jiang Nan V (Chinese: 乾隆游江南第五集)	Jiang Qifeng	
1930	Qian long You Jiang Nan VI (Chinese: 乾隆游江南第六集)	Jiang Qifeng	
1930	Shi Gong An: Sequel (Chinese: 施公案（续集）)	Jiang Qifeng	
1930	Four Hreoine (Chinese: 四大女侠)	Qian Xuefan	
1930	Lei Tai Hero (Chinese: 擂台英雄)	Xu Zhongxia	
1930	Yellow Sea Pirate (Chinese: 黄海盗)	Zhang Huichong	
1930	Yang Naiwu (Chinese: 杨乃武)	Qiu Qixiang	Based on the case of Yang Naiwu and Little Cabbage
1930	Da Nao She Ying Chang (Chinese: 大闹摄影场)	Li Zeyuan	
1930	The Naughty General (Chinese: 风流督军)	Mei Xuechou	
1930	The Hall of Broken Zither (Chinese: 碎琴楼)	Zheng Zhengqiu, Cai Chusheng	
1930	Ogles of a Woman (Chinese: 媚眼侠)	Dan Duyu	
1930	The Case in the Studio (Chinese: 画室奇案)	Dan Duyu	
1930	Gu du chun meng (Chinese: 故都春梦)	Sun Yu	
1930	Ye cao xian hua (Chinese: 野草闲花)	Sun Yu	
1930	Suicide Contract (Chinese: 自杀合同)	Zhu Shilin	
1930	Monk in the Ancient Temple (Chinese: 古寺神僧)	Yip Yat-Sing, Wang Chunyuan	
1930	Kunlun Big Thief (Chinese: 昆仑大盗)	Yip Yat-Sing	
1930	Evil King on the Golden Island (Chinese: 金岛魔王)	Yip Yat-Sing	
1930	In Hatred of Loving (Chinese: 海天情仇)	Bu Wancang	
1930	The Bitterness of A Marriage (Chinese: 百劫鸳鸯)	Chen Tian	
1930	Swordswoman of Huang Jiang (Chinese: 荒江女侠)	Chen Kengran, Zheng Yisheng, Shang Guanwu	Partial
1930	A Plot with Blood (Chinese: 血花泪影)	Wu Cun	
1930	Burning Seven - Stars Mansion III (Chinese: 火烧七星楼第三集)	Yu Boyan	
1930	Burning Seven - Stars Mansion IV (Chinese: 火烧七星楼第四集)	Yu Boyan	
1930	Burning Seven - Stars Mansion V (Chinese: 火烧七星楼第五集)	Yu Boyan	
1931	Burning Seven - Stars Mansion VI (Chinese: 火烧七星楼第六集)	Yu Boyan	
1931	Girl the Murder (Chinese: 杀人的小姐)	Tan Zhiyuan, Gao Lihen	
1931	Swordswoman of Huangjiang VI (Chinese: 荒江女侠 第六集)	Chen Kengran, Shang Guanwu	Partially lost
1931	The Golden-Rooster Ridge (Chinese: 火烧刁家庄)	Hu Zongli	
1931	The Souls of Freedom (Chinese: 自由魂)	Wang Cilong	
1931	Monk in the Mountain (Chinese: 荒山奇僧)	Wang Yin	
1931	Stranger in the Old House (Chinese: 古屋怪人)	Dan Duyu	
1931	Love and Duty (Chinese: 恋爱与义务)	Bu Wancang	Later rediscovered in Uruguay in the 1990s
1931	Heroine (Chinese: 巾帼须眉)	Yu Boyan	
1931	The Theft and Hero Robin (Chinese: 侠盗卢宾)	Yip Yat-Sing	
1931	Paper Man (Chinese: 纸人捣乱记)	Mei Xuechou, Wan Guchan	Animation
1931	It's Unlucky to Be A Woman (Chinese: 空门红泪)	Shao ZuiWeng	
1931	Yunlan the Girl (Chinese: 芸兰姑娘)	Shao ZuiWeng	
1931	The Last Love (Chinese: 最后之爱)	Shao ZuiWeng	
1931	Murder in the Dance Hall (Chinese: 舞女血)	Jiang Qifeng	
1932	Rebel Girl (Chinese: 绿林奇女子)	Min Dezhang	
1932	Ding Feng Zhu (Chinese: 女侠定风珠)	Qian Xuefan, Ji Fansan	
1932	Jade Circle (Chinese: 玉连环)	Qian Xuefan	
1932	Chinese Hero (Chinese: 中国大侠)	Zhang Huichong	
1932	Answering the Nation's Call（Chinese: 共赴国难）	Sun Yu	
1932	Xu gu du chun meng (Chinese: 续故都春梦)	Bu Wancang	
1933	City's Sin (Chinese: 都市的罪恶)	Yip Yat-Sing, Qian Xuefan	
1933	Three Modern Women (Chinese: 三个摩登女性)	Bu Wancang	
1933	Raging Waves (Chinese: 狂流)		
1933	Night in the City（Chinese: 城市之夜）	Fei Mu	Fei Mu's debut work
1933	Such a Hero (Chinese: 如此英雄)	Zhuang Guojun	
1934	Goodbye, Shanghai（Chinese: 再会吧，上海）	Gi-tak Jeong	Partially lost
1934	Life (Chinese: 人生)	Fei Mu	
1934	Xiang Xuehai (Chinese: 香雪海)	Fei Mu	
1934	Women（Chinese: 女人）	Shi Dongshan	
1935	Ardent, Loyal Souls (Chinese: 热血忠魂)	Yuan Tsung-Mei	

== Sound films ==
Year	Film	Director	Note
1931	Sing-Song Girl Red Peony (Chinese: 歌女红牡丹)	Zhang Shichuan	The first Chinese sound film
1931	Peace After Storm (Chinese: 雨过天青)	Xia Chifeng	
1931	Ge chang chun se (Chinese: 歌场春色)	Li Pingqian	
1931	The Heroine Black Peony (Chinese: 女侠黑牡丹)	Ren Pengnian	
1931	The Flying General (Chinese: 飞将军)	Ren Pengnian	
1931	24 Heros III (Chinese: 江湖二十四侠第三集)	Hu Zongli	
1931	Full Moon (Chinese: 人月圆)	Yu Boyan	
1931	Heartbreak (Chinese: 心痛)	Yang Xiaozhong	
1931	Striver (Chinese: 努力)	Wan Laitian	
1931	Shi Gong An III (Chinese: 施公案第三集)	Jiang Qifeng	
1931	The Beauty (Chinese: 虞美人)	Chen Kengran	
1931	Huang Jiang Nu Xia Episode 7 (Chinese: 荒江女侠第七集)	Chen Kengran, Shang Guanwu	
1932	Huang Jiang Nu Xia Episode 9 (Chinese: 荒江女侠第九集)	Chen Kengran	
1932	Savage (Chinese: 莽汉)	Xu Wenrong, Hu Zongli	
1932	Little Actress (Chinese: 小女伶)	Qiu Qixiang	
1932	Trace (Chinese: 兰谷萍踪)	Qiu Qixiang	
1932	The Pink Butterfly (Chinese: 女侠粉蝶儿)	Hu Zongli	
1932	Clourful World (Chinese: 花花世界)	Wan Laitian	
1932	Red Butterfly III (Chinese: 红蝴蝶第三集)	Jiang Qifeng	
1932	A Warrior of the Northeast IX (Chinese: 关东大侠第九集)	Ren Pengnian	
1932	A Warrior of the Northeast XII (Chinese: 关东大侠第十二集)	Ren Pengnian	
1932	A Warrior of the Northeast XIII (Chinese: 关东大侠第十三集)	Ren Pengnian	
1933	A Real Man (Chinese: 大丈夫)	Ren Pengnian	
1933	Secret in the Picture (Chinese: 图中秘密)	Ren Pengnian	
1933	The Iron Men (Chinese: 铁血情澜)	Qian Xuefan	
1933	Blood Road (Chinese: 血路)	Qian Xuefan	
1933	Peace Flower (Chinese: 和平之花)	Hu Zongli	
1933	Wild Flower (Chinese: 蛮荒之花)	Chen Cang	
1933	Pursuit (Chinese: 追求)	Qiu Qixiang	
1933	Fiery Youth (Chinese: 青春之火)	Qiu Qixiang	
1933	Lone Troop (Chinese: 孤军)	Chen Tian	
1933	Willow Blossoms (Chinese: 飞絮)	Shao Zuiweng	
1933	The Lucky Land (Chinese: 吉地)	Shao Zuiweng	
1933	All for Legacy (Chinese: 孽海双鸳)	Shao Zuiweng	
1933	Morning in the Metropolis (Chinese: 都会的早晨)	Cai Chusheng	
1933	Stirring of Love (Chinese: 春潮)	Zheng Yingshi	
1933	The Lin Family's Shop (Chinese: 展览会)	Chen Kengran	
1933	Vanilla Cuttie (Chinese: 香草美人)	Chen Kengran	
1933	Go to Shanghai (Chinese: 到上海去)	Ku Wen Chung	
1933	Teardrop (Chinese: 泪痕)	Lu Shi	
1933	Jiang Nan Yan (Chinese: 江南燕)	Jiang Qifeng	
1933	New Year's Eve (Chinese: 除夕)	Jiang Qifeng	
1933	The Beautiful Soul:Prequel (Chinese: 美人魂前集)	Jiang Qifeng	
1934	The Kindred Feelings (Chinese: 骨肉之恩)	Jiang Qifeng	
1934	Abandoned Love (Chinese: 弃爱)	Ji Fansan	
1934	Untouchable Love (Chinese: 癞蛤蟆想吃天鹅肉)	Han Xiuyun, Han Langen	
1934	Our Mansion (Chinese: 我们的公馆)	Han Xiuyun, Han Langen	
1934	Bao yu li hua (Chinese: 暴雨梨花)	Ma-Xu Weibang	
1934	Dawn (Chinese: 黎明)	Shao Zuiweng, Wang Yuanlong	
1934	MR.Wang (Chinese: 王先生)	Shao Zuiweng	
1934	Song of The Fishermen (Chinese: 渔光曲)	Cai Chusheng	Partial
1934	Two Couples (Chinese: 红楼春深)	Gao Lihen	
1934	Hot Blood Young Man (Chinese: 热血青年)	Tang Jie	
1934	Floating Flowers (Chinese: 飞花村)	Zheng Yingshi	
1934	Women (Chinese: 妇道)	Chen Kengran	
1934	Under The Ermei Mountain (Chinese: 峨眉山下)	Wan Laitian	
1934	Huan Xi Yuan Jia (Chinese: 欢喜冤家)	Qiu Qixiang	
1935	Goddess of Freedom (Chinese: 自由神)	Situ Hui-min	
1935	Ni tu Huang Jin (Chinese: 泥土黄金)	Zhu Xuhua	
1935	A Hero of Our Time (Chinese: 时势英雄)	Ying Yunwei	
1935	Dazed and Crazy (Chinese: 昏狂)	Ren Pengnian	
1935	Remembering the Past (Chinese: 回首当年)	Guan Youzhang	Hong Kong, Cantonese
1935	Men without Worries (Chinese: 无愁君子)	Shen Fu, Zhuang Guojun	
1935	The Beauty's Favour (Chinese: 美人恩)	Wen Yimin	
1935	Life (Chinese: 生活)	Shao Zuiweng	Hong Kong, Cantonese
1935	Schoolmate (Chinese: 女同学)	Shao Zuiweng	
1935	Recovery (Chinese: 重归)	Gao Lihen	
1936	Return to Nature (Chinese: 到自然去)	Sun Yu	
1936	Sing-song Girl Baozhen (Chinese: 国色天香)	Dan Duyu	
1936	Night of Madness（Chinese: 狂欢之夜）	Shi Dongshan	
1936	Wedding Night (Chinese: 花烛之夜)	Yueh Feng	
1936	Joyous Day（Chinese: 囍临门）	Yueh Feng	
1936	Map of Treasures (Chinese: 百宝图)	Yueh Feng	
1936	A Guangzhou Woman (Chinese: 广州一妇人)	Shao Zuiweng	Hong Kong, Cantonese
1936	Guangling Tide (Chinese: 广陵潮)	Chen Kengran	
1937	Tan Xing Nv Er (Chinese: 弹性女儿)	Chen Kengran	
1937	Stone (Chinese: 石破天惊)	Dan Duyu	
1937	Romance of the Country Girl (Chinese: 乡下女艳史)	Hu Zongli	
1937	Three-Day Massacre in Guangzhou (Chinese: 广州三日屠城记)	Hu Zongli	
1937	Fuchun River (Chinese: 富春江)	Zhuang Guojun	
1937	Stars Moving around the Moon（Chinese: 三星伴月）	Fang Peilin	
1937	All Loves (Chinese: 满园春色)	Yueh Feng, Xu Suling, Fang Penglin, Chen Kengran	
1937	The Tender Heart (Chinese: 天之骄女)	Guan Youzhang	Hong Kong, Cantonese
1937	The Magnificent Country (Chinese: 锦绣河山)	Chen Tian	Hong Kong, Cantonese
1937	Lady, Be Mine (Chinese: 金屋藏娇)	Chen Tian	Hong Kong, Cantonese
1937	Posh Life (Chinese: 富贵荣华)	Shao Zuiweng, Wen Yimin	
1938	Blood on Baoshan Fort (Chinese: 血溅宝山城)	Situ Hui-min	
1938	Dance Class (Chinese: 艺海风光三：歌舞班)	Situ Hui-min	
1938	Woman Spies (Chinese: 桃色间谍)	Chen Tian	Hong Kong, Cantonese
1938	Defending Our Land (Chinese: 保卫我们的土地)	Shi Dongshan	
1939	Reunion (Chinese: 破镜重圆)	Shao Zuiweng	
1939	Good Husband（Chinese: 好丈夫）	Shi Dongshan	
1939	Li Sanniang (Chinese: 李三娘)	Zhang Shichuan	
1939	A Fair Actress（Chinese: 影城记）	Chen Kengran	
1939	Meng Jiang Nu (Chinese: 孟姜女)	Wu Cun	
1939	The New Hell（Chinese: 新地狱）	Wu Cun	
1939	Out of the Hell (Chinese: 七重天)	Zhang Shichuan	Partial
1939	Dong Xiao Wan (Chinese: 董小宛)	Zhang Shichuan, Zheng Xiaoqiu	
1939	The Naked Kingdom (Chinese: 裸国风光)	Zhuang Guojun	
1940	White Cloud Hometown (Chinese: 白云故乡)	Situ Hui-min	Hong Kong, Cantonese
1940	Chang Kong Wan Li (Chinese: 长空万里)	Sun Yu	
1940	March of Victory（Chinese: 胜利进行曲）	Shi Dongshan	
1940	Meng Lijun (Chinese: 孟丽君)	Zhang Shichuan	
1940	Singing Girl（Chinese: 天涯歌女）	Wu Cun	Partial
1940	The Dark City (Chinese: 黑天堂)	Wu Cun	
1940	Three Laughter (Chinese: 三笑)	Zhang Shichuan, Zheng Xiaoqiu	
1940	Love Story of Su San (Chinese: 苏三艳史)	Wu Cun	
1941	The Brave Man (Chinese: 一身是胆)	Zhang Huichong	
1941	Baptism by fire (Chinese: 火的洗礼)	Sun Yu	
1941	The Broken Dream (Chinese: 梦断关山)	He Zhaozhang	
1941	The Unpleasant Springtime (Chinese: 恼人春色)	Zhang Shichuan, He Guangzhang	
1941	Young Propagandists (Chinese: 解语花)	Zhang Shichuan	
1944	Love and Hate (Chinese: 爱与恨)	Wang Yin	
1944	Feng Huang Yu Fei (Chinese: 凤凰于飞)	Fang Penglin	
1944	Great River, Great Mountain (Chinese: 气壮山河)	He Feiguang	Incomplete
1944	Blood Shed on Oriental Cherry (Chinese: 血溅樱花)	He Feiguang	Incomplete
1946	Reeds Get White and Swallow Leaves (Chinese: 芦花翻白燕子飞)	He Feiguang	Hong Kong, Mandarin
1947	Darlings (Chinese: 郎才女貌)	Chen Kengran	
1947	Memories of the South (Chinese: 忆江南)	Ying Yunwei, Wu Tian	
1948	Childhood Sweetheart (Chinese: 青梅竹马)	Xu Changlin	
1948	The Vagabond Master, Part Three (Chinese: 江湖奇侠（三集）)	Dan Duyu	
1948	Same Fate (Chinese: 同是天涯沦落人)	He Feiguang	
1948	Lü Siniang (Chinese: 吕四娘)	Xu Xinfu	
1948	Blood of the Beauty (Chinese: 美人血)	Xu Xinfu	
1948	Nezha's Adventure at the East Ocean (Chinese: 哪咤闹东海)	Yip Yat-Sing	Hong Kong, Cantonese
1948	13th Hauted House (Chinese: 十三号凶宅)	Xu Changlin	
1948	Patriotic Spirit of the Spy (Chinese: 间谍忠魂)	Wang Yin	Hong Kong, Mandarin
1948	God of the Animal Kingdom (Chinese: 兽国神魔)	Yip Yat-Sing, Hung Chung-Ho	Hong Kong, Cantonese
1948	Dream Adventures in Heaven（Chinese: 梦游天国）	Ye Yixiang, Yan Hua	Hong Kong, Cantonese
1949	Parted Lovers (Chinese: 失去的爱情)	Tang Xiaodan	
1949	12 Hours Wonder (Chinese: 十二小时的奇迹)	Xu Changlin	
1949	The Red Boy (Chinese: 红孩儿)	Yip Yat-Sing	Hong Kong, Cantonese
1949	Nazha Conquers the Seven Devils at Mount Mei (Chinese: 哪咤梅山收七怪)	Yip Yat-Sing	Hong Kong, Cantonese
1949	Kiddy Stone' Night Battle with the Five Tiger Generals (Chinese: 石鬼仔夜战五虎将)	Yip Yat-Sing	Hong Kong, Cantonese
1949	The Big Fight Between Red Kid and Five Dragon Princess (Chinese: 红孩儿大战五龙公主)	Yip Yat-Sing	Hong Kong, Cantonese
1950	Three Lady Hermits (Chinese: 封神榜之一：大破黄河阵)	Yip Yat-Sing	Hong Kong, Cantonese
1950	How the Immortal Cripple Lee Slew the Dragon in the North Sea (Chinese: 铁拐李北海斩妖龙)	Yip Yat-Sing	Hong Kong, Cantonese
1950	Spring in South (Chinese: 江南春晓)	Xu Changlin	
1950	Between Man And Beast (Chinese: 人兽之间)	He Feiguang	
1950	The Battle between Monkey King and Gold-Spotted Leopard|(Chinese: 马骝精大战金钱豹)	Hung Chung-Ho	Hong Kong, Cantonese
1951	The Precious Lamp in the Moon Palace (Chinese: 月宫宝灯)	Yip Yat-Sing	Hong Kong, Cantonese
1951	Stallion on the Milky Way (Chinese: 银河飞马)	Yip Yat-Sing	Hong Kong, Cantonese
1951	Peace Dove (Chinese: 和平鸽)	Tao Jin	
1951	A Pretty Girl's Favours (Chinese: 桃花运)	Chen Tian	Hong Kong, Cantonese
1951	Nazha and the Pot of Treasure (Chinese: 哪吒争夺聚宝盆)	Ren Yutian	Hong Kong, Cantonese
1952	The Beautiful Bandit (Chinese: 绿林红粉)	Ren Yutian	Hong Kong, Cantonese
1953	Rainbow Rhythms (Chinese: 彩虹曲)	Yueh Feng, Tao Qin	Colour film

== Works cited ==
- Huang, Xuelei (2014). Shanghai Filmmaking: Crossing Borders, Connecting to the Globe, 1922–1938. Leiden: Brill. ISBN 978-90-04-27933-9.
