= Zhang Zhiyun =

Chinese actress (fl. 1923–1953)

- Zhang Zhiyun, painted by Jin Meisheng
- Born: Zhang Ashan (張阿善; 张阿善); 1904 or 1905; Panyu, Guangzhou, Guangdong, Qing China
- Died: 2 November 1963; British Hong Kong
- Occupation: Actress
- Years active: 1923–1953

Chinese name
- Traditional Chinese: 張織雲
- Simplified Chinese: 张织云
Transcriptions
Standard Mandarin
- Hanyu Pinyin: Zhāng Zhīyún
- Wade–Giles: Chang^{1} Chih^{1}yün^{2}
Yue: Cantonese
- Jyutping: Zoeng^{1} Zik^{1}wan^{4}

Zhang Zhiyun (traditional Chinese: 張織雲; simplified Chinese: 张织云; pinyin: Zhāng Zhīyún, c. 1905–3 November 1963) was a Chinese actress. Born in Panyu County, Guangdong, she moved to Shanghai in her youth. Hired by the Greater China Film Company through a general casting call, she later transferred to Mingxing, with whom she made the commercially successful Lonely Orchid (1926) and was crowned "movie queen" in a newspaper poll. She left the film industry after beginning a relationship with Tang Jishan, and when they severed ties she was unable to regain her stardom despite making several films. Zhang moved to British Hong Kong in her later years.

== Biography ==
=== Early life ===
Zhang was born Zhang Ashan (張阿善; 张阿善) in Panyu County, Guangdong (now part of Guangzhou) in 1904 or 1905. She was orphaned at a young age and lived with an adoptive mother. She moved to Shanghai in her youth, where she completed several years of schooling. However, due to a lack of funds she dropped out in her junior secondary years.

=== Film career ===
In 1923, Zhang responded to an advertisement from the Greater China Film Company seeking interested women to act in its films. More than ten thousand women submitted their photograph. Initially, Zhang's portrait was not included in the pictures reviewed by Greater China. It was later found that ten photographs, including Zhang's, had been taken by a journalist with the Shanghai-based newspaper Shen Bao – whose mailbox the company had used – after he deemed them the most beautiful. Zhang was selected from these recovered pictures for the company's upcoming productions, and the theft of her portrait was used to generate hype. Zhang spent two years with Greater China, completing such films as The Human Heart and Valour in War.

Zhang signed with the Mingxing Film Company in 1925, making her first appearance in A Sincerely Pitiful Girl. Over the next three years she made seven films for the company, including Lonely Orchid (1926), in which she portrayed the dual role of a lovelorn young woman and the servant whose death is mistaken for hers. The film was one of the most successful Chinese films of the silent era, pulling in a reported 132,300 yuan (equivalent to ¥12,729,000 in 2019) in Shanghai alone. Between August and September 1926, Shen Bao held a reader's choice award for favourite actress; Zhang won the poll, receiving 2,146 ballots and being crowned the newspaper's "movie queen".

After completing Fallen Plum Blossoms for Mingxing, Zhang left the company for its rival Minxin. For her role in Pure as Ice, she gained audience recognition as a tragedy performer, with the magazine Movie Life (影戲生活; 影戏生活) comparing her to Lillian Gish.

=== Later life and career ===
In the mid-1920s, Zhang moved in with Bu Wancang, a cinematographer and director. As Zhang became more famous, the two began to fight, and Zhang – under pressure from her adoptive mother to find a wealthier man – left him by 1927. She later began dating Tang Jishan, a tea merchant, leaving the film industry to spend time with him in the United States. However, the couple separated after Tang began romancing fellow actress Ruan Lingyu. An agreement that Tang would provide her with financial support in case of a separation went unhonoured.

Zhang was asked by Zhang Shichuan to return to Mingxing for Lovelorn in 1933. Intended to tell her life's story, the sound film suffered because of Zhang's poor command of Mandarin – the language of dialogue – and was received negatively. She appeared in several further films, including 1935's Fan of Peach Blossoms and 1937's Cantonese-language Proud Daughter of Heaven. She spent time in Hankou, toured Southeast Asia, and lived briefly in Tianjin and Beijing. She ultimately settled in British Hong Kong in the 1950s with her husband Zhang Shuping.

Zhang made her final film appearance, a cameo as a beauty pageant panellist alongside Yang Naimei and Wu Suxin, in 1953's Heavenly Beauty. She died in Hong Kong on 2 November 1963, though some articles have incorrectly reported her as having died homeless in the mid-1970s after spending the last decade of her life living on the streets under her childhood name. She has received less coverage than contemporary actresses such as Ruan Lingyu and Hu Die.

== Filmography ==
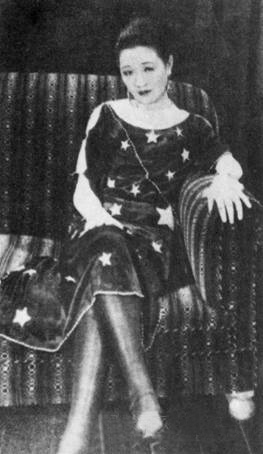
Zhang Zhiyun in Fiancée (1926)

Key
†	Indicates film is extant

The films of Zhang Zhiyun
English title	Traditional Chinese	Simplified Chinese	Release	Ref(s)
The Human Heart	人心	人心	–	
Valour in War	戰功	战功	–	
A Sincerely Pitiful Girl	可憐的閨女	可怜的闺女	1925	
A New Family †	新人的家庭	新人的家庭	1926	
Lonely Orchid	空谷蘭	空谷兰	1926	
Fiancée	未婚妻	未婚妻	1926	
Love and Gold	愛情與黃金	爱情与黄金	1926	
Sacrifice for the Family	為親犧牲	为亲牺牲	1927	
Fallen Plum Blossoms	梅花落	梅花落	1927	
Pure as Ice	玉潔冰清	玉洁冰清	–	
Lovelorn	失戀	失恋	1933	
Fan of Peach Blossoms	新桃花扇	新桃花扇	1935	
Proud Daughter of Heaven	天之驕女	天之骄女	1937	
Heavenly Beauty	天堂美女	天堂美女	1953	

== Works cited ==
- Huang, Xuelei (2014). Shanghai Filmmaking: Crossing Borders, Connecting to the Globe, 1922–1938. Leiden: Brill. ISBN 978-90-04-27933-9.
- Jing Zhiyu (景智宇). 张织云：中国第一位电影皇后 [Zhang Zhiyun: China's First Movie Queen] (in Chinese). Huangpu District Archives (Shanghai, China). Archived from the original on 25 June 2024.
- Qiao Ran (樵髯) (11 May 2021). "Zhang Zhiyun: The Life She Easily Gave Up Was Exactly What Ruan Lingyu Dreamed Of" 张织云：她轻易放弃的生活，正是阮玲玉梦寐以求的. The Paper. Archived from the original on 10 January 2025.
- Tang Lang (唐郎) (12 July 1964). ｢張織雲｣病逝經過 [How "Zhang Zhiyun" Died of Illness]. The Kung Sheung Evening News (in Chinese). p. 6.
- "The Tragic Life of Zhang Zhiyun, China's First "Movie Queen" and "Tragedy Master"" 中国第一位"影后"，"悲剧圣手"张织云的悲剧人生. The Paper. 26 April 2020. Archived from the original on 10 January 2025.
- "Wu Suxin, Zhang Huimin, and the Huaju Studio Silents". The Chinese Mirror: A Journal of Chinese Film History. Archived from the original on 29 May 2010.
- Yu, Sabrina Qiong (2012). "Vulnerable Chinese Stars: From Xizi to Film Worker". In Zhang, Yingjin (ed.). A Companion to Chinese Cinema. Hoboken, New York: John Wiley & Sons. pp. 218–238. ISBN 978-1-4443-3029-8.
- Zhang Yu (張玉) (2018). 1920年代の中国における黒岩涙香野の花の受容 [The Reception of Kurogan Ruikou's No No Hana in China in the 1920s: Focusing on the Silent Film Lonely Orchid] (PDF). Border Crossings: The Journal of Japanese-Language Literature Studies (in Japanese). 6 (1): 147–163. doi:10.22628/bcjjl.2018.6.1.147. Archived (PDF) from the original on 9 March 2020.
