= Judy Dan =

Chinese-American actress (born 1930)

- 但茱迪
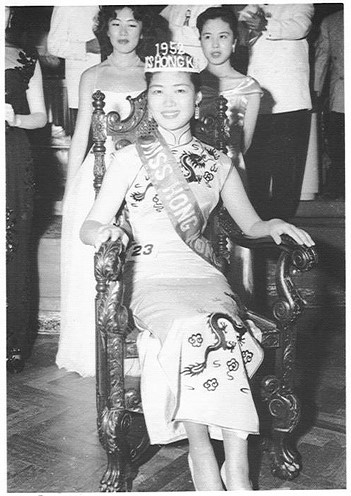
- Dan as Miss Hong Kong Pageant 1952 Winner
- Born: September 9, 1930 (age 95); Shanghai, Republic of China
- Citizenship: American
- Education: George Pepperdine College
- Spouse: Tom Woo (m. 1954; died 2017)
- Children: 3 daughters
- Parents: Dan Duyu (father); Yin Mingzhu (mother)
- Awards: Miss Hong Kong 1952

Judy Dan (Chinese: 但茱迪; Dàn Zhūdí; born September 9, 1930) is a Chinese-American actress and beauty pageant titleholder.

== Biography ==
Judy Dan was born in Shanghai on September 9, 1930, the daughter of film director Dan Duyu and actress Yin Mingzhu. She was raised in Hong Kong. She worked for Cathay Pacific where she was talent spotted. In 1952, she won the Miss Hong Kong Pageant, then known as the Miss Hong Kong Beauty Contest, and was third runner-up at the Miss Universe 1952 contest. Her participation and finish in the Miss Universe competition brought her a contract with 20th Century Fox film studio.

== Other ==
Dan studied drama at George Pepperdine College and appeared in three plays during her two-and-one-half years there.

== Personal life ==
Dan married Tom Woo Fong on August 21, 1954, an architect in West Los Angeles. The couple had three daughters. Woo died on April 1, 2017.

== Filmography ==
Year	Title	Role	Notes
1953	Destination Gobi	Nura-Salu	
1956	The King and I	Royal Wife	Uncredited
1956	Flight to Hong Kong	Stewardess	Uncredited
1957	Pal Joey	Hat Check Girl	Uncredited
1960	Wake Me When It's Over	Geisha Girl	Uncredited
1962	War Is Hell	Yung Chi Thomas	
1962	Perry Mason/The Case of the Weary Watchdog	Trixie Tong	
1962	The Spiral Road	Laja	
1962	Stagecoach to Dancers' Rock	Loi Yan Wu	
1967	Kill a Dragon	Chunhyang	
