= Yin Mingzhu =

Chinese actress

- 殷明珠
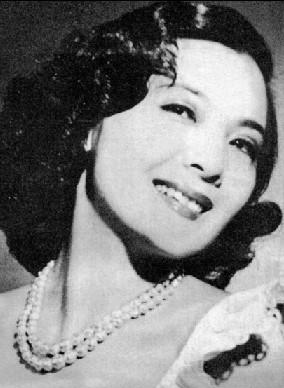
- Yin in the 1930s
- Born: Yin Shangxian; 1904; Wujiang, Suzhou, Qing Empire
- Died: 1989 (aged 84–85); British Hong Kong
- Other names: Pearl Ing; Miss. F. F.
- Education: McTyeire School for Girls
- Occupations: actress, investor, production coordinator
- Spouse: Dan Duyu (m. 1926; died 1972)
- Children: Dan Qingpin (daughter); Judy Dan (daughter)

Yin Mingzhu (Chinese: 殷明珠; born Yin Shangxian (Chinese: 殷尚贤); 1904 – 1989), also known as Pearl Ing, was a Chinese actress. Mingzhu was most famous for her role as an actress but was also an investor and production coordinator specifically during her time off camera in the 1930s. She was the mother of beauty contest winner and actress Judy Dan.

== Early life and education ==
She was born Yin Shangxian in 1904 in Wujiang, now part of Suzhou, Jiangsu Province of China. She moved to Shanghai at a young age. Mingzhu came from a distinguished family as her father was a well known painter and members of her family from the past three generations had been members of the Hanlin Academy, an academy known for being prestigious within academics and administration. Mingzhu's father died when she was a child, leaving her mother a winning lottery ticket which allowed her to move the entire family to Shanghai. In Shanghai, Mingzhu was a top student at McTyeire School for Girls where she learned new ideas and manners.

== Biography ==
Before finding fame in the film industry, Mingzhu was known as "Miss. F. F.", which stood for "Miss Foreign Fashion". She was a sensation within the elite society of Shanghai. At the age of seventeen, Mingzhu met director Dan Duyu at a party and the pair began working together, making films. As Mingzhu and Duyu started to establish a work relationship, the pair fell in love, despite Mingzhu being married to a Frenchman. Mingzhu vowed to remain loyal when her husband was redeployed back to his home country. After he failed to return to Shanghai, Mingzhu married Duyu in February 1, 1926, they had two daughters, Dan Qingpin and Judy Dan. While Yin Mingzhu starred in about half of the 30 movies directed by Duyu, most are believed to be lost films. Mingzhu, and Duyu's relationship was unique to that of any other couple in the film industry. Traditionally, it was the director, or husband, that made the actress, or wife, famous. In the case of Mingzhu and Duyu, it was widely recognized that Mingzhu's fame brought Duyu his own fame and success. The couple later moved to Hong Kong, where Mingzhu died in 1989.

== Career ==
Mingzhu began her career as an actress in the silent film era when she met Duyu. In 1921, Mingzhu joined Duyu's Shanghai Shadow Play Company, where she starred in Duyu's Sea Oath. Reviews for Sea Oath praised Mingzhu for her performance as a first time actress. However, Mingzhu's career was in danger of ending after the publicity Sea Oath as her mother forbid her from making any more films. In 1925, three years after Mingzhu left the film industry, her mother gave in and allowed her to star in Duyu's "philiosopical film", Some Girl. Mingzhu starred in many other productions after this, some directed by Duyu, and some by other Chinese directors and filmmakers. Some of Mingzhu's most famous work as an actress includes The Spider Cave, A Dream of Red Mansions, Oriental Nights, The Golden Age, and, Peach-Blossom Dreams.

Aside from her work as an actress, Mingzhu is also known for her work as an investor and production coordinator. During the three-year period that her mother forbid her from acting, Mingzhu became an investor by investing in the Shanghai Shadow Play Company. When bankruptcy threatened the future of the production company after the failure of Imperial Concubinebine of Yang, Mingzhu invested her own personal savings into the company to save it. In 1932, during the Second Sino-Japanese War, the Shanghai Shadow Play Company was destroyed. Both Mingzhu and Duyu were out of work until 1934 when Mingzhu invested in and set up the Shanghai Talkie Company for her husband.

In addition to her work as an investor, Mingzhu worked as a production coordinator for films made under both the Shanghai Shadow Play Company and the Shanghai Talkie Company, specifically during her pregnancies when she was not acting. Her knowledge obtained about the film industry from her work as an actress and investor coupled with her English skills helped her in her role of a production coordinator as she was able to connect with various groups and individuals on and off the film set.

== Filmography ==
Note: in most early Chinese films, there often were no official English translations, leading to a sometimes confusing lack of consistency in titles.

	=== As an actress ===	Director	Other notable figures
1922	Sea Oath (海誓)	Dan Duyu	
1925	Back Home From the City aka Some Girl (重返故乡)	Dan Duyu	also starring Ma-Xu Weibang and Shi Dongshan
1926	Family Heirloom (传家宝)	Dan Duyu	
1926	Repayment		
1927	The Cave of the Silken Web (盘丝洞) aka. Journey to the West - the Spiders Cave (西游记-盘丝洞) aka. Spiders	Dan Duyu	
1928	A Dream of Red Mansions		
1928	The Diamond Case		
1929	Sister, I Love You (妹妹我爱你) aka. The Flying Thief (飞行大盗)	Dan Duyu	
1929	South Seas Beauty		
1932	An Innocent Girl		
1933	Golden Age (黄金时代)	Bu Wancang	
1934	Peach-Blossom Dream		

	Yin Mingzhu as an actress, investor, and production coordinator
1923	Ripples of an Old Well
1929	The Spider Cave II
1930	The Leering Swordsman
1930	The Case in the Studio
1930	Tofu Master
1930	Oriental Story
1931	Stranger in the Old House

Filmography from
