= Chen Tian =

Taiwan female performer

Tân Tiⁿ
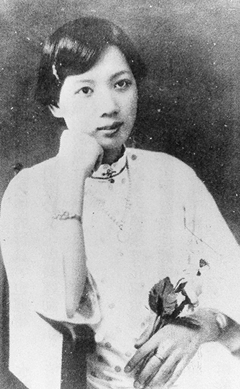
- Chen in 1923
- Born: 1900
- Died: 1986 (aged 85–86); Taipei
- Occupations: Courtesan and supporter of social activism

Chinese name
- Traditional Chinese: 陳甜
Transcriptions
Standard Mandarin
- Hanyu Pinyin: Chen Tian
Southern Min
- Hokkien POJ: Tân Tiⁿ
- Tâi-lô: Tân Tinn

Chinese name
- Traditional Chinese: 陳精文
Transcriptions
Standard Mandarin
- Hanyu Pinyin: Chen Jingwen
Southern Min
- Hokkien POJ: Tân Cheng-bûn
- Tâi-lô: Tân Tsing-bûn

Chen Tian (Chinese: 陳甜; Pe̍h-ōe-jī: Tân Tiⁿ , 1900–1986), also known as Tân Cheng-bûn (陳精文; Chen Jingwen), was a Taiwanese courtesan or Gē-tòaⁿ (藝旦) and supporter of social movements in the Taiwanese resistance to Japanese rule. She was Chiang Wei-shui's concubine.

== Life ==
Around 1919, Chen Tian was a Gē-tòaⁿ (藝旦) in a high-end restaurant in Taihoku. While working there she met Chiang Wei-shui, one of the founders of the Taiwanese Cultural Association (1921) and, later, the Taiwanese People's Party (1927). Chen married Chiang as a concubine. Chiang taught Chen how to read and write, and Chen began reading Chinese and Japanese books. Chen Tian joined the Taiwanese Cultural Association's Taipei Youth Reading Club. She was the club's only female member. Thereafter, Chen helped Chiang with his activism and, when Chiang was imprisoned (in 1924 and 1925), she supported him through correspondence, sending him clothes, books and articles by other activists, and also replaced him in lectures, giving speeches to promote his ideas.

After Chiang died on August 5, 1931, of typhoid fever, Chen became a nun in the Ciyun Buddhist Temple. She resided there until her death in 1986.

== Popular culture ==
Chen Tian features in the musical The Impossible Times, based on Chiang Wei-shui's life.
