= Jiang Naifang =

Chinese actress

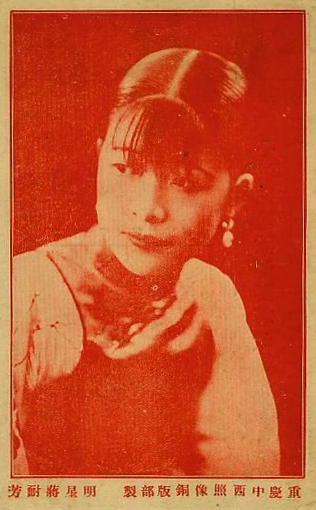
Chinese actress Jiang Naifang (蒋耐芳) from a postcard made while she was making movies (between 1925 and 1932).

Jiang Naifang (蒋耐芳) was a Chinese actress from the silent-film era in Shanghai in the 1920s and early 1930s. She acted in at least 10 movies from 1925 through 1932. In January 1927 she was featured on the cover of Liangyou pictorial, also known as the Young Companion, an international magazine from Shanghai that frequently featured leading actresses and artists of the day.

== Movies ==
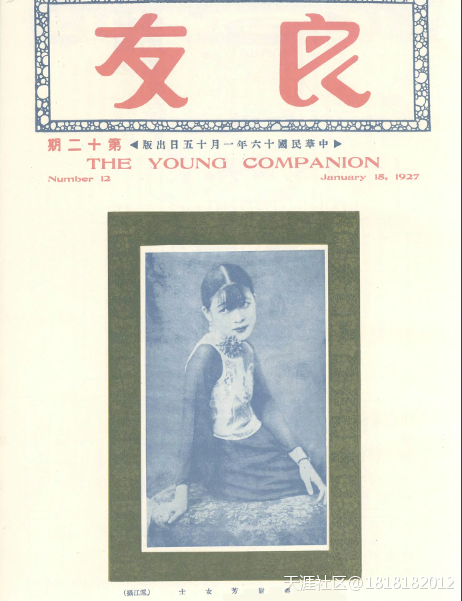
Jiang Naifang on the cover of the Young Companion magazine, January 1927.

=== Longhua Film Company (朗华影片公司) ===
- 1925 The Dream of Women (南华梦)
- 1925 The Dream of Women (南华梦), sequel

=== New Talent Film Company (新人影片公司) ===
- 1926 Three Girls in Shanghai (上海三女子)

=== Guoguang Film Company (国光影片公司) ===
- 1927 Song Field ( 歌场奇缘)

=== Jinlong Film Company (金龙影片公司) ===
- 1928 Legend of the Flying Dragon (飞龙传)

=== Tianyi Film Company (天一影片公司) ===
- 1930 Continuation of the case (施公案)
- 1930 Continuation of the case (施公案) sequel
- 1930 Continuation of the case (施公案) episode 3
- 1930 Emperor Qianlong Tours the South (乾隆游江南) episode 7
- 1931 Emperor Qianlong Tours the South (乾隆游江南) episode 9
- 1932 Empty Door Tears (空门血泪)
- 1932 Orchid Girl (芸兰 姑娘)
