= The Cave of the Silken Web (1927 film) =

Chinese film by Dan Duyu

- Directed by: Dan Duyu
- Screenplay by: Guan Ji'an
- Based on: Journey to the West by Wu Cheng'en
- Starring: Yin Mingzhu
- Cinematography: Dan Ganting
- Release date: 2 February 1927
- Running time: 60 min
- Country: Republic of China
- Language: Silent (Chinese intertitles)

Full film

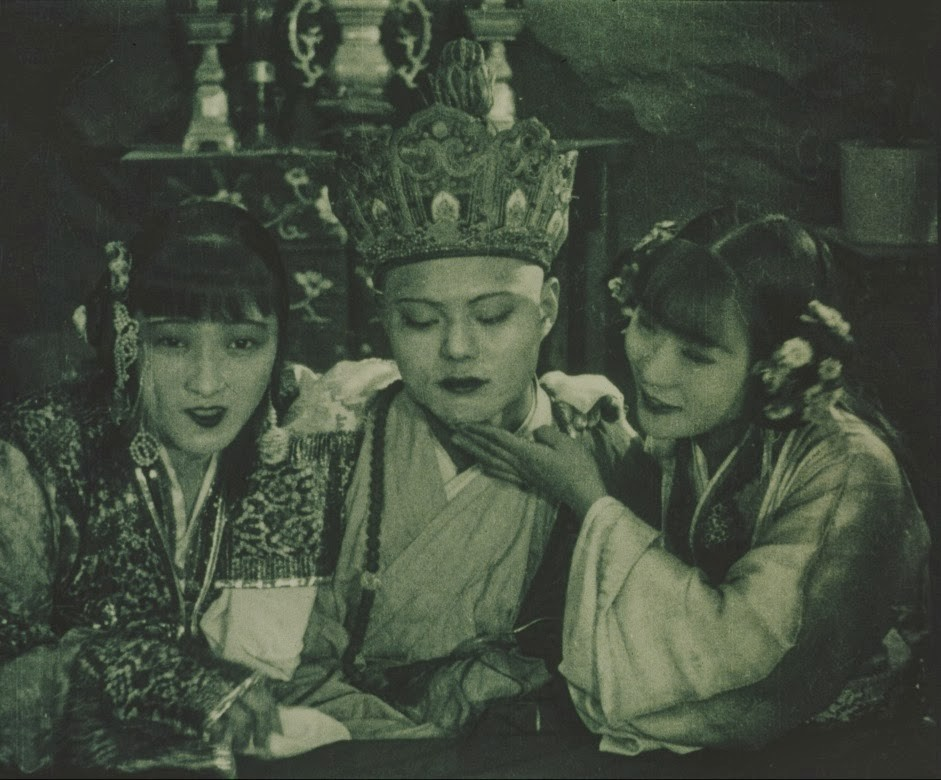
Still from The Cave of the Silken Web (1927)

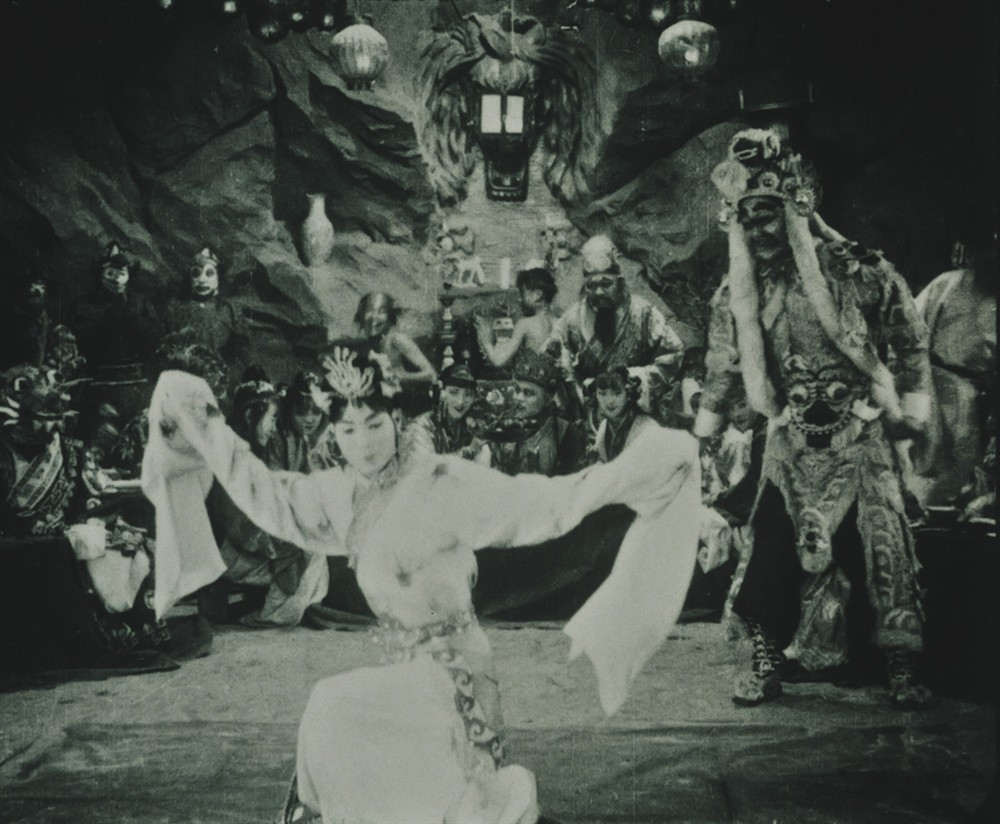
Still from The Cave of the Silken Web (1927)

The Cave of the Silken Web (traditional Chinese: 盤絲洞; simplified Chinese: 盘丝洞; pinyin: Pan Si Dong) a.k.a. Journey to the West – the Spiders Cave (西遊記-盤絲洞; 西游记-盘丝洞) a.k.a. Spiders is a 1927 Chinese film directed by Dan Duyu and starring Yin Mingzhu as the first spider spirit. It is based on an episode of the shenmo fantasy novel Journey to the West, a Chinese literary classic written in the Ming Dynasty.

This film follows a monk on a journey to the west to find ancient sutras. Six women lure him into their "spider cave." In the kitchen, away from the monk, the spider women and their servant discuss eating him. They try to get the monk to eat, specifically non-vegetarian food, but he refuses. The monk grows weary and suspicious and tries to leave, but the spider women don't let him. Later, someone accuses the spider women of holding the monk against his will. They deny the accusation and invite the accuser to search their home. Eventually, the monk is set to marry one of the spider women, unaware of her true nature.

The ten-reel silent film was produced by Shanghai Yingxi Company.

It was thought to be a lost film until 2011, when an original copy of The Cave of the Silken Web was discovered in the archives of the National Library in Mo i Rana, Norway. The film was presented at the 2013 Films from the South festival in Oslo. Roughly three-quarters of the film is preserved, the first reel and a section in the middle is lost. The Norwegian copy has retained the original Chinese intertitles, but includes additional jokes in Norwegian written for the local audience.

== Plot ==
A monk named Xuanzang and three companions – the Monkey King, the Pig Spirit, and the Turtle Spirit. are sent by the Emperor Tai-Tsung on a journey west to find ancient Buddhist scriptures. Eventually Xuanzang becomes quite hungry. He leaves his companions to enter a cave to ask for food. He encounters seven beautiful women who invite him in to rest and eat. Unbeknownst to him, the monk has arrived in a 'spider web cave' inhabited by women whose true form are massive spiders.

The seven women appear to possess supernatural powers, as a quarter of the way through the film one of the women appears to teleport through a stone wall. The monk, while appearing to reject their romantic advances, humbly requests a vegetarian meal. Away from the monk, in the kitchen inside the cave, the spider woman and their servant discuss eating the monk.

Away from the cave, the Monkey King claims that he can "smell spirits," and that "the venerable father has fallen into the hands of evil spirits" that are "trying to seduce" him. The three companions of the monk set out to rescue the monk. The spider women try to get the monk to eat meat, but the monk refuses. The monk grows weary and suspicious, and tries to leave, but the spider women don't let him.

The spider woman offers the monk to stay permanently with them, where he will be clothed and fed, and discourage his spiritual mission to find "crummy old sutras." Six of the spider women go to take a bath while one spins a large web to trap the monk. Eventually they scheme for one of their seven spider women to marry the visiting monk.

Eventually the Monkey King and the Pig Spirit arrive at the cave and accuse the spider women of holding the monk against his will in their cave. The Pig Spirit even goes as far as to threaten the spider woman with his weapon if they do not release the monk. They deny the accusation and invite the accusers to search their house for the monk. One of the spider women offers permanent hospitality to the Pig Spirit, but he refuses and does not trust them. They eventually coax the Pig Spirit into climbing into their spider web and he is tied up like a prisoner. The Monkey King enters the cave and uses his powers to transform into a likeness of one of the seven beautiful spider women. He is thus able to sneak past their guards and untie the Pig Spirit. The Pig Spirit then attempts to seduce the beautiful woman, unaware until he transforms back to his shape that this is the Monkey Spirit in disguise.

The Pig Spirit and the Monkey King then engage in a combat scene with two spider women as well as their aforementioned slave. The women and their slave escape by weaving a web that the two companions can not pass through. The monk eventually witnesses his soon-to-be wife transform into a huge spider on the day of their wedding. His opinion of her is changed by this event.

Soon after, it seems the Monkey King that tried to free the monk in earlier parts of the movie returns again to try and free the monk. The spider women try to hide the monk to prevent his being taken away from them by the Monkey King. The Monkey King succeeds in reducing their cave to rubble and dust via fire. The cave, along with the lustful passions of the spider women, are burned to a crisp as the spider women all transform back into their true form, massive spiders. The monk escapes with his three companions.

== Cast ==
- Yin Mingzhu as First Spider Spirit
- Xia Peizhen as Second Spider Spirit
- Wu Wenchao as Sun Wukong
- Jiang Meikang as Tang Sanzang
- Zhou Hongquan as Zhu Bajie
- Dan Erchun as Sha Wujing
- He Rongzhu as Man In White
- Chen Baoqi as Yellow Flower Daoist Spirit
- Zhan Jiali as Sandy
- Gu Yinjie as Fire Slave

== Sequel ==
The film was followed by a sequel in 1930 titled The Cave of the Silken Web II (續盤絲洞; 续盘丝洞; Xu Pan Si Dong), a.k.a. Spiders II, also directed by Dan Duyu and starring Yin Mingzhu. The sequel is believed to be a lost film.

== Rediscovery and preservation of the film ==
The Cave of the Silken Web (1927) was long considered a lost film until its rediscovery in 2011 at the National Library of Norway's film archive in Mo i Rana. The film had originally been screened in Norway in 1929 as the first Chinese film ever shown in the country. The Norwegian copy contained both its original Chinese intertitles alongside Norwegian intertitles added for the 1929 screening. Notably, these Norwegian intertitles were not direct translations, occasionally incorporating localized humor tailored for Norwegian audiences. According to Liu Dong, the rediscovered print was found during a large-scale inspection project involving approximately 9,000 reels of film at the National Library of Norway.

Representatives of the Chinese Film Archive were first notified of the discovery of an unknown Chinese film during the 68th International Federation of Film Archives (FIAF) congress held in April 2012. Where it would later be officially handed off to Sun Xianghui, Deputy Director of the China Film Archive by Roger Josevold, Deputy National Librarian of Norway. Following over six months of archival research and verification between the Norway's National Library and China's Film Archive, the film was conclusively identified as the long-lost The Cave of the Silken Web. In 2013, the restored The Cave of the Silken Web was first screened at the Film from the South Festival.

Films showing signs of nitrate decomposition were sent to the Haghefilm Digital Laboratory in Amsterdam. The film underwent restoration using the Desmet method, a photochemical technique specifically developed for color correction of early silent films. This process successfully recovered the film's original color scheme. Following restoration, the film was presented on a new 35mm print.

Liu Dong describes the film as the first Chinese silent film known to have survived and kept outside China and later returned to the China Film Archive. The return have significant impact on the study of 1920s Chinese film production and the international circulation of early Chinese cinema.

== Historical and cultural context ==
The ten-reel silent film The Cave of the Silken Web, directed by Dan Duyu and starring Yin Mingzhu, was produced by the Shanghai Yingxi Company. It premiered at the Palace Theatre in Shanghai on February 2, 1927, during the Lunar New Year holiday. The feature adapts a famous episode from the Ming Dynasty novel Journey to the West, in which a monk and his companions are lured by seductive spider spirits into a deadly cave. Upon its original release in China, the film set new box office records for a domestic production. Chinese scholars have described The Cave of the Silken Web as an important example of early Chinese fantasy and Shenmo (神魔) cinema. The film is often known for its use of visual spectacle, visual effects, and supernatural imagery.

The film's release coincided with a period of cultural fascination with vampiric imagery in 1920s China. While Western vampires like Nosferatu were already culturally familiar in China during this period, the term took on distinctly Chinese characteristics through Tian Han's essay The Vampire Century, which introduced the concept of fanpaiya (vampire). Inspired by the May Fourth era's women's liberation movement, Tian compared the modern, assertive women to these vampire figures, thereby establishing a new femme fatale archetype in Chinese zeitgeist. While not a direct vampire story, the film shares characteristics with the vampire genre, including themes of temptation and transformation, along with a fanpaiya-like antagonist in the form of the Spider Queen.

=== Yin Mingzhu and new women representation in Chinese film ===
Yin Mingzhu, the actress who played the Spider Queen in The Cave of the Silken Web, had established a strong reputation and public image long before the film's release. She broke through the traditional boundaries placed on women of her time through her westernized clothing style and her participation in various leisure activities.

As a child, Yin Mingzhu was already challenging the conventional gender roles for women in China. She dressed in bold, Western styles and was skilled in activities such as driving, horse-riding, swimming, and dancing—most of which were considered inappropriate or unattainable for the typical female celebrity of the era. Her outgoing and fearless persona helped pave the way for a new kind of lifestyle for the modern Chinese woman. Her unconventional image even drew comparisons to Pearl White, a popular American actress of the time.

Yin Mingzhu married Dan Duyu, a filmmaker who produced numerous films. He had a particular interest in portraying the physical beauty of women through artistic cinematography. The Cave of the Silken Web (1927) was no exception, especially with Yin Mingzhu, now his wife, in the leading role. Dan Duyu was able to realize his artistic vision through semi-nude scenes featuring the actresses. This film, along with other works featuring Yin Mingzhu, was heavily criticized by the Chinese public for its untraditional approach. However, despite the criticism, Yin Mingzhu went on to become a pioneer for change—a symbol of liberation from traditional gender roles, as women began to break free from the confines of domestic life.

== Differences between film and novel ==
Dan Duyu's 1927 silent film The Cave of the Silken Web adapts two chapters from the classic Chinese novel Journey to the West, but it introduces significant deviations in plot, and characterization.

=== Marriage Ceremony and Humanization of the Spider Women ===
The novel states that the spider demons desire Tang Xuanzang's flesh for immortality. In contrast, the film includes a marriage ceremony between the spider queen and Xuanzang, complete with ritual bows, which obscures the demons' cannibalistic intentions. The ceremony has an air of genuineness, with no mention of eating the monk's flesh or blood. The film's focus on the wedding gives the audience the impression that the spider women have "ordinary human feelings". According to Shaoyi Sun, the spider demons reflect contemporary anxieties surrounding female sexuality and modernity in Republican time Chinese cinema.

=== Martial and supernatural abilities ===
Studies of Chinese fantasy cinema have connected early supernatural films to broader traditions of mythological storytelling and popular entertainment in Chinese film culture.

In the novel, the spider women are largely passive figures, with the exception of their successful trapping of Pigsy. They ultimately depend on intervention from a more powerful Taoist master. The film, however, grants them greater agency and martial prowess, though they remain outwitted by Sun Wukong in the end. The choice to give the seven spider women a more active role aligns with the women's liberation ideals of the May Fourth New Culture Movement.

Film scholar Shaoyi Sun places The Cave of the Silken Web within a broader wave of Chinese fantasy cinema in the 1920s that combined traditional mythology with modern cinematic spectacle and effects.

== See also ==
- The Cave of the Silken Web (1967 film)
- List of Chinese films before 1930
- List of rediscovered films
