= The Difficult Couple =

1939 chinese film produced by Zhang Schichuan and Zheng Zhengqiu

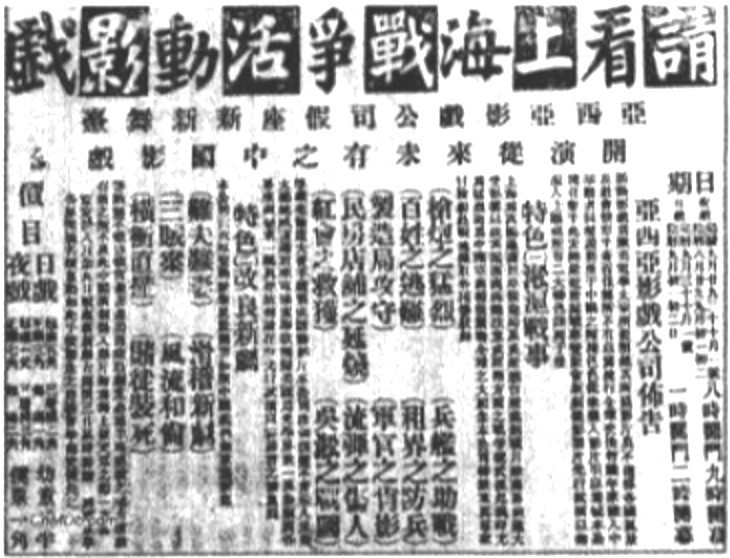
- Promotional advertisement
- 难夫难妻
- Directed by: Zhang Shichuan; Zheng Zhengqiu
- Starring: Ding Chuhe; Wang Bingseng
- Production company: Asia Film Company
- Release date: 29 September 1913 (Shanghai)
- Running time: 30 minutes
- Country: China
- Language: Chinese

The Difficult Couple (Chinese: 难夫难妻; pinyin: Nànfū Nànqī), also translated as Die for Marriage, is a 1913 Chinese film. It is known for being the earliest Chinese feature film. Although it had a dialogue of only a little more than 1,000 characters, it was the first Chinese film with a script. It is considered a lost film.

== Plot ==
The story unfolds in an ancient Chinese village where a young couple resides amidst poverty. They lean on each other for support, but their marriage faces severe challenges due to the hardships of life and external pressures.

The husband, a diligent farmer, struggles against natural disasters and other uncontrollable factors, making their lives exceedingly difficult. His wife, a kind and resilient woman, silently supports him at home, striving to sustain the family's livelihood.

However, as the pressures of life mount, conflicts between the couple begin to surface. They grapple with the hardships of life and societal pressures, leading to tension and crisis in their marriage. Ultimately, amidst various trials and tribulations, the film delves into how this couple navigates and resolves their predicament.

== See also ==
- Cinema of China
- List of lost Chinese films
