= Zhang Huichong =

Cantonese director, actor, sailor, and magician (1898–1962)

Zhang Huichong (1898–1962) was a Cantonese director, actor, sailor, and magician. He was the fifth oldest out of eleven total brothers in his extended family and the eldest brother in his immediate family. His brothers Zhang Qingpu and Zhang Huimin also worked in the film industry and founded their own film company called Huaju. One of his younger brothers, Zhang Damin, was the ex-husband of the famous silent film actress, Ruan Lingyu. Zhang Huichong is known for helping Ruan Lingyu start her acting career by urging her to audition for films and introducing her to a film producing company.

== Films ==
The two-minute surviving fragment of Huichong's Out of the Hell

Zhang Huichong directed and starred in many films throughout the 1920s. Several years into his acting career, he created his own company called Huichong Film Company. Zhang directed and starred in several martial arts films while he was running this company. They were some of the first martial arts films seen in China. Over time, martial arts cinema was refined by Zhang Huichong and Zhang Huimin. The two brothers shaped an ideal modern form for the genre. Zhang Huichong has also been credited as one of China's first martial arts film stars.

Films Starred In

- 1922 – The Lotus Falls; directed by Ren Pengnian
- 1922 – The Good Brothers; dir. Ren Pengnian
- 1923 – The Patriotic Umbrella; dir. Ren Pengnian
- 1924 – The Stupid Policeman; dir. Chen Shouyin
- 1925 – The Newlyweds' Home; dir. Ren Jinpin
- 1926 – The Unknown Hero; dir. Zhang Shichuan
- 1927 – Fallen Plum Blossoms (3 parts); dir. Zhang Shichuan
- 1927 – Tian Qilang (Adaptation); dir. Zhang Shichuan
- 1927 – Ma Yongzhen From Shandong; dir. Zhang Shichuan
- 1929 – Hero With No Foes; dir. Shao Zuiweng
- 1929 – China's Top Detective; dir. Xu Wenrong
- 1930 – Love and Revenge; dir. Bu Wancang

Films Starred and Directed

- 1924 – When Water Goes Down, Rocks Appear
- 1924 – Five O'Clock
- 1925 – Out of the Hell
- 1926 – Seizing a National Treasure
- 1927 – Hero of the Waters
- 1928 – The Little Tyrant Wang Zhangchong
- 1930 – Robber of the Yellow Sea
