= Li Zeyuan =

Chinese baseball player

Beijing Tigers
- Third baseman
- Born: April 23, 1986 (age 40); Beijing, China
- Bats: Right Throws: Right

Li Zeyuan (born April 23, 1986) is a Chinese baseball third baseman who plays with the Beijing Tigers in the China Baseball League. He was the first Chinese player to play in the Shikoku-Kyūshū Island League in Japan when he appeared for the Kagawa Olive Guyners in 2009.

Li represented China at the 2012 Asia Series, 2015 Asian Baseball Championship, and 2017 World Baseball Classic.
