= Love and Duty (1931 film) =

1931 film

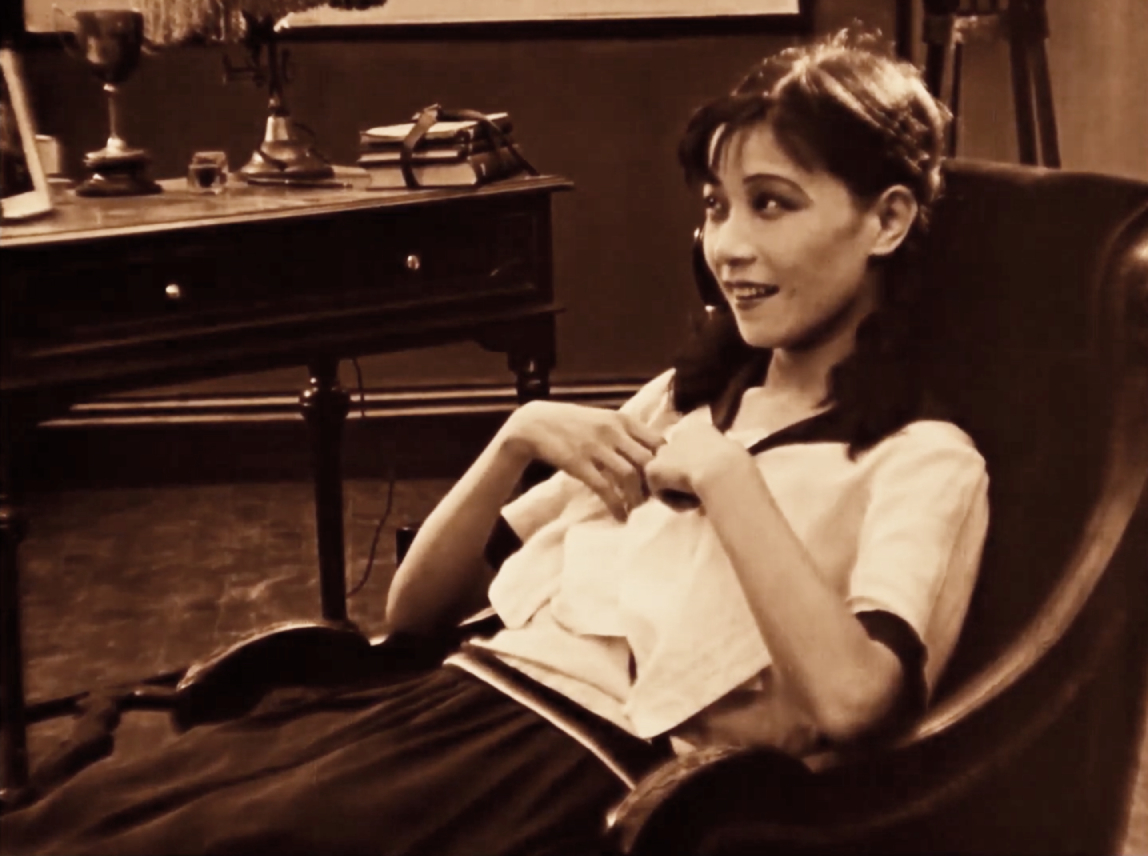
- Ruan Lingyu as Yang Nei Fan
- Traditional Chinese: 戀愛與義務
- Simplified Chinese: 恋爱与义务
- Hanyu Pinyin: Liàn'ài yǔ yìwù
- Directed by: Bu Wancang (Richard Poh)
- Written by: Zhu Shilin (Chu Shek Lin)
- Based on: Love and Duty by S. Rosen Hoa (S. Horose / Hua Lou Chen)
- Produced by: Lo Ming-yau (Luo Mingyou)
- Starring: Ruan Lingyu (Lily Yuen); Jin Yan (Raymond King)
- Cinematography: Huang Shaofen (Wong Siu Fan)
- Production companies: United Photoplay Service (Lianhua yingye gongsi / 聯華影業公司); China Sun Motion Picture Co. (Minxin yingpian gongsi / 民新影片公司)
- Release date: 1931 (China)
- Running time: 151 minutes
- Country: China
- Languages: Silent film Written Chinese and English intertitles

Love and Duty (1931) by Bu Wancang

Love and Duty is a 1931 Chinese silent film, directed by Bu Wancang and starring Ruan Lingyu (Lily Yuen) and Jin Yan (Raymond King). Though very successful upon initial release in China, the film was then lost for decades before it was rediscovered in Uruguay in the 1990s. It is now housed at the Taiwan Film and Audiovisual Institute.

The melodrama stars Ruan Lingyu, portraying two different characters in the film: the mother, Yang Nei Fan, and Huang Koon Ying, Nei Fan's daughter. For shared scenes, split screen technology is used to make both characters appear on screen at the same time.

== Production history ==
Released in April 1931, the film is based on the novel, Love and Duty, by a Polish-Jewish expatriate living in Beijing, S. Rosen-Hoa (also known as S. Horose and Hua Luo Chen).

The novel Love and Duty written by Rosen-Hoa was first published in Chinese in 1923 as eight installments in the literary magazine The Story World (xiaoshuo shijie / 小說世界). It was then released as a stand-alone novel the following year. An English-language version was then released in 1926 and a French-language version under the title La Symphonie des Ombres Chinoises (A Symphony of Chinese Shadowplay) in 1932.

Rosen-hoa gave a copy of her novel to Lo Ming-Yau, the future producer of the film, in 1923. Ming-Yau thought that the novel, with its sophisticated plot, should be adapted to film. However, it would not be until eight years later, after Ming Yau formed the United Photoplay Service (also referred to as Lianhua Film Company) alongside Lai Man-Wai, that this project would come to fruition and the film was finally made. This was also due to the growth of the film industry at the time.

The film was attributed to both United Photoplay Service and China Sun Motion Picture Co., the film company headed by Lai Man-Wai that was absorbed into United Photoplay Service upon its formation, as United Photoplay Service was not yet registered when shooting began.

The newly established United Photoplay Service had the stated goal of raising the standard of domestic productions to match the quality of foreign imports that dominated China's market, and reach new audiences overseas. As one of the first films ever produced by the company, this mission can be seen in its promotion of the film in both English and Chinese-language newspapers at the time of its release, as well as the decision to include bilingual Chinese and English intertitles.

The film was very popular in its day, in no small part due to the pairing of Ruan Lingyu, a darling of the Shanghai film industry, and Jin Yan, a Korean-born actor who was one of the major leading men in early Chinese cinema.

== Cast ==
List of all cast members credited onscreen in the film, in order of first appearance.

The names of cast members and the characters they play are given as they appear in film's English intertitles, with the Hanyu Pinyin and Traditional Chinese in parentheses.

- Raymond King (Jin Yan / 金焰) as Li Tsu Yi (Li Zuyi / 李祖義)
- Lily Yuen (Ruan Lingyu / 阮玲玉) as Yang Nei Fan (Yang Naifan / 楊乃凡) and adult Huang Koon Ying (Huang Guangying / 黃冠英)
- Yu Juyun 俞菊雲 as Tsu Yi's mother (Li Zuyi zhi mu / 李祖義之母)
- Shi Juefei 時覺非 as Chang Shun (Zhang Shun / 張順)
- Xu Xinyuan 徐莘園 as Yang Weng (楊翁)
- Li Ying 黎英 as Huang Ta Jen (Daren / 黃大任)
- Liu Jiqun 劉繼群 as Hu Fu (胡福), Nicknamed Old Fox (Lao Hu / 老狐) - a homophonic pun
- Lily Chow (Zhou Lili / 周麗麗) as Chang Ying (Zhang Ying / 張瑛)
- Chen Yanyan 陳燕燕 as adult Ping Erh (Ping'er / 平兒)
- Huang Ke 黃克 as adult Huang Koon Sung (Huang Guanxiong / 黃冠雄)
- Wang Yiwen 王意文 as Mary (Mali / 瑪莉)
- Ouyang Bolu 歐陽伯盧 as John (Yuehan / 約翰)
- Guo Yingying 郭鶯鶯 as Kwan Ta Hua (Guan Dahua / 關達華)
- William Kolland (Gao Weilian / 高威廉) as Kwan Ke Sheng (Guan Kesheng / 關克勝)

== Plot ==
The film opens in the small town of Kiangwan (江灣/Jiangwan), described as remote from the busyness of Shanghai where the rich can live a quiet life. One morning on his way to school, Li Tsu Yi spots Yang Nei Fan, also on her way to school, and is immediately infatuated with her. He starts to pursue her intensely, waiting for her at the end of the school day so he can follow behind her. Nei Fan ignores his attentions until an incident in which she is hit by a car, and Tsu Yi uses a piece of his shirt to bandage her wounded leg. After both Tsu Yi and Nei Fan return to their respective homes that day, they are shown reminiscing about the encounter — Nei Fan holding the piece of Tsu Yi's shirt, and Tsu Yi holding Nei Fan's handkerchief, which he obtained by accident.

Soon after this, Nei Fan's father arranges a marriage for his daughter with a young man of good background, Huang Ta Jen. Though Nei Fan is reluctant, she submits to her father's authority and agrees to the marriage. Nei Fan and Ta Jen then have a son and daughter together.

A few years pass before Nei Fan and Tsu Yi meet again by accident, when her son Huang Guanxiong falls into a lake while playing at the park and Tsu Yi comes to his aid. Each time that they meet subsequently, their relationship becomes increasingly intimate. During this time, Ta Jen is also seeing another woman without Nei Fan's knowledge. Finally, Nei Fan decides to leave Ta Jen and elope with Tsu Yi, leaving her children behind. After her desertion, Ta Jen takes care of their children and severs his bond with the other woman.

While Nei Fan and Tsu Yi are happy for a while, Tsu Yi loses a respectable job after the Huang family's servant Fox recognizes him. After much searching and many rejections, Tsu Yi is forced to take a low-paying job to support his family. The overwork from his job then exacerbates a longstanding undisclosed illness, leading to his death. Nei Fan is then left on her own to take care of their daughter Ping Erh, after her former husband and her father reject her requests to return.

Fifteen years pass with Nei Fan raising Ping Erh in poverty, working as a seamstress to support them. Her work as a seamstress leads her to encounter her first two children again when she is assigned to tailor outfits for them. Though she is overjoyed to see them again, her shame stops her from revealing her identity. In the end, Nei Fan decides to commit suicide and hand Ping Erh over to Ta Jen in order to liberate Ping Erh from Nei Fan's shame and allow her more opportunities. Ta Jen is moved by Nei Fan's act and agrees to take care of Ping Erh, introducing her to her two siblings. The film ends with the three siblings looking up at the photographic portrait of their late mother, their backs to the camera as if facing an ancestral shrine looking as they are paying homage to their mother.

== Rediscovery ==
For many years the film was believed to be lost, until a extant copy was discovered in a collection of materials transferred from the National Library of Uruguay in Montevideo to the National Central Library in Taiwan in 1993. The rediscovered print was then rehoused to the Taiwan Film and Audiovisual Institute (TFAI).

Two decades after its initial rediscovery, in 2013, the film was digitally restored under TFAI's newly established Taiwan Cinema Restoration project. The film was sent to Italy's L'Immagine Ritrovata where it underwent a 2K digital restoration. The newly restored copy was then screened at the Shanghai Film Festival in 2014.

Since its rediscovery, the film has made its rounds in film festivals and Chinese cinema retrospectives around the world. Shortly after its rediscovery, it was screened at the 14th Pordenone Silent Film Festival in Pordenone, Italy in 1995. More recently, it has been screened at the Seattle International Film Festival in 2017 and at the TFAI for World Day for Audiovisual Heritage in 2023.

== Remakes ==
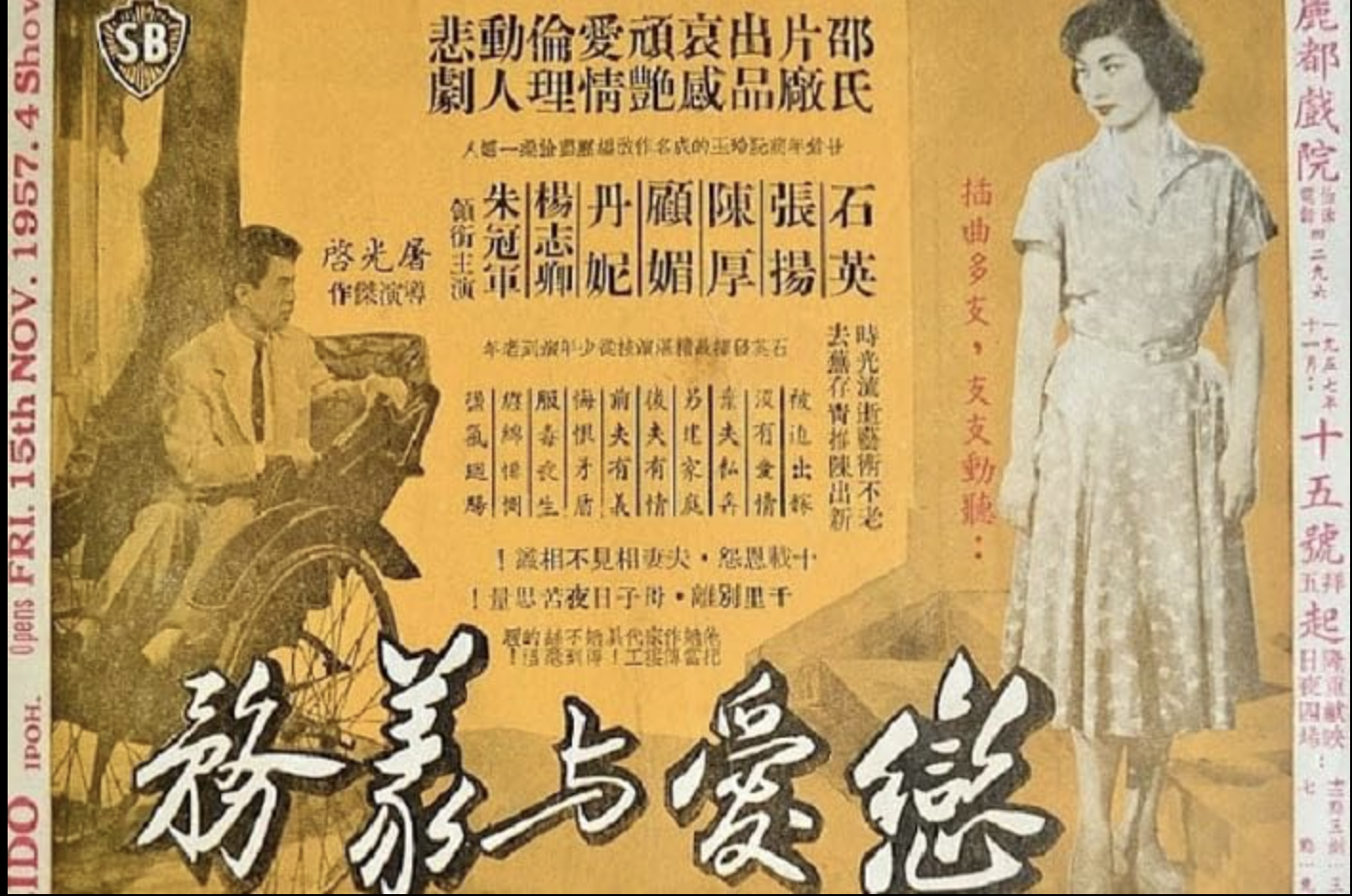
Advertisement for the 1955 remake of Love and Duty

Love and Duty has been remade two times since the original 1931 film. It was first remade in 1938 under the title Days of Love, Blood, and Tears (qing tian xuelei / 青天血淚). This remake was produced by the wartime Shanghai "Orphan Island" studio Xinhua Film Company, again directed by Bu Wancang, with Jin Yan reprising his earlier role of Tsu Yi and Yuan Meiyun in the role originally acted by Ruan Lingyu. The second remake was in 1955 by the Hong Kong Shaw Brothers Studio under the title Love and Obligation in English (lianai yu yiwu / 戀愛與義務). Both remakes were Mandarin dialect sound films.

== Symbolic Interpretations of the Film ==
Professor Yuan Qingfeng points out that the films that were produced between the years of 1905 and 1932 in China are considered to be old generation films. Then, Yuan also writes in his article that the focus points of these old films are on the traditional concepts about the relationship between a couple or the lives of family members. Love and Duty was made at the last days of the old films, so it followed suit. In addition, the scholar says that there is usually an immoral person in the romantic relationship in the film, and because of the lowly status of women in China at the time, female protagonists are usually chosen. As said in the article, for Love and Duty, the negative example is Yang Nei Fan, and in order to teach the audience, Nei Fan has to go through pain and death for her affair. However, Yuan's article says that even though Ta Jen also betrays the marriage, he, as a male character, can repent and become a brilliant example of father and partner in marriage. The article continues to state that the film is criticizing the concept of how romantic relationship can be decided without the presence of their parents by expressing that the love between Nei Fan and Tsu Yi is based on duty-forgetting needs and condemning Tsu Yi to death, for example. Furthermore, Yuan's article indicates that the characters' names have their own meanings, and the phrase that has the same pronunciation in Mandarin as Li Tsu Yi means turning back on the lessons of the ancestors, pointing at his affair with Nei Fan, for instance.

Similarly, film scholar Laikwan Pang observes that the film’s visual techniques reinforce this gendered moral framing. Ruan Lingyu’s expressive performance and the use of chiaroscuro lighting serve to externalize Nei Fan’s inner emotional struggle, while Jin Yan’s character is presented more statically and with greater composure, reflecting male authority and control. This contrast supports the film’s broader message about women's burden of morality in Chinese society.

Another scholar, Wang Dake, states that the scene of Nei Fan's father arranging marriage for Nei Fan is an expression of the superior authority of father in the thinking of old society. Moreover, Wang Dake says in his article that the film is authentic in arranging Tsu Yi and Nei Fan to be murdered by financing and other people's words instead of letting them have a happy life together. Finally, the same author composes that from the plot of the film, the audience can understand what the third word in the film's name means. Kerlan mentioned that "the film, a silent production, is indeed an interesting blend of a Hollywood type’s silent feature and Chinese ethical and cultural values." Building on this, film scholar Kristine Harris points out that Love and Duty draws heavily from Western silent melodrama, particularly in its use of narrative techniques like cross-cutting, emotional close-ups, and symbolic lighting. Harris argues that while the film adopts formal elements from Hollywood cinema, it adapts them to reinforce Confucian moral values, embedding global cinematic language within a culturally specific ethical framework.Therefore, contradicting the ideology of modernization, as still using morals from previous generations. Thus, in the 1930s, the family still served as a gilded prison that contradictorily protected and oppressed women by treating them as property. Kristine published in a later paper that the United Photoplay Service strategically “staged,” even allegorized, Shanghai to signal its cosmopolitan ambitions while simultaneously alluding to Chinese filmmakers’ quest for a kind of “cinematic sovereignty” during the early Nanjing decade.

== See also ==
- List of rediscovered films
- Cinema of China
