= Lonely Orchid =

1926 silent Chinese film directed by Zhang Shichuan

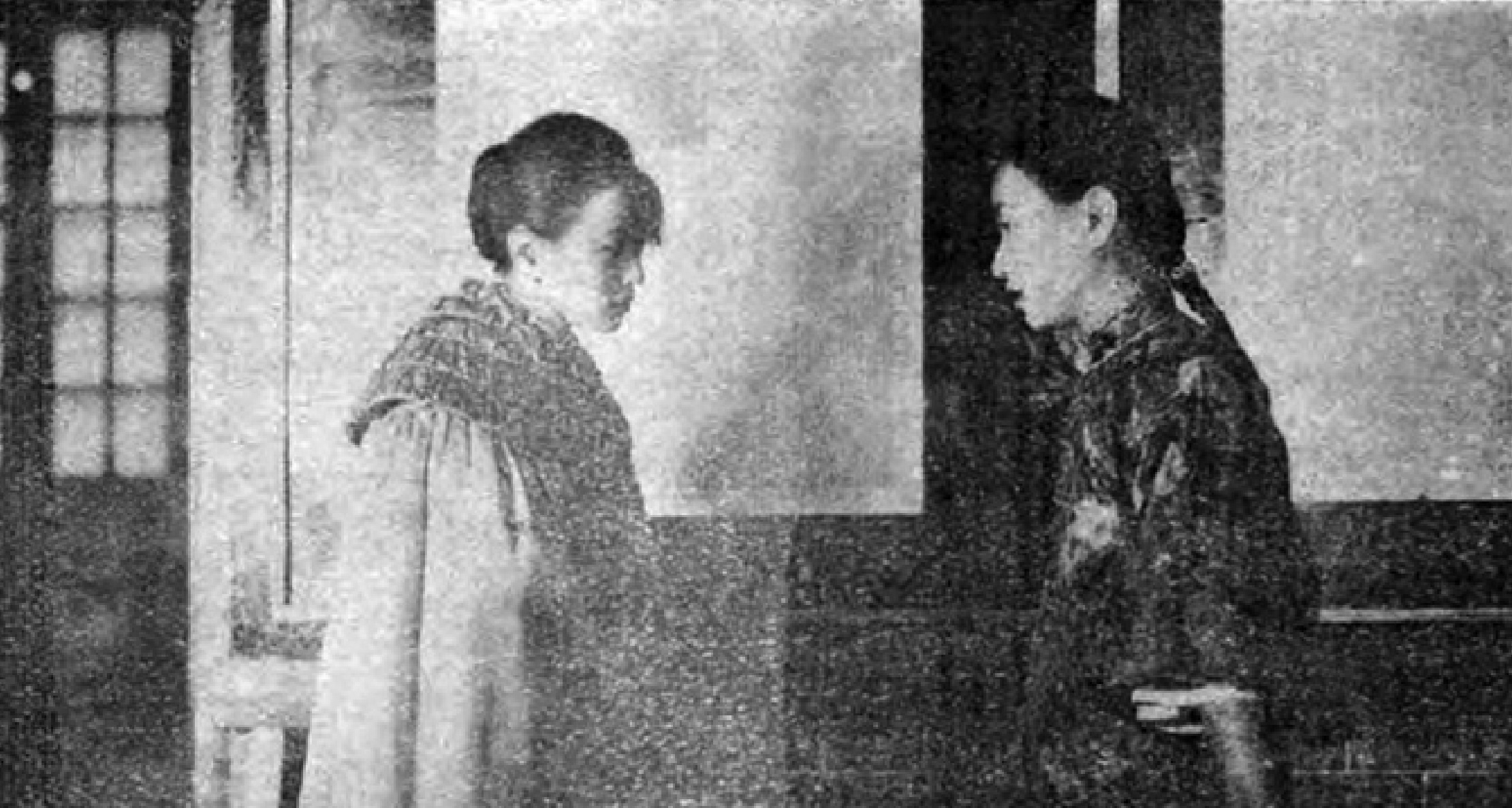
- A scene from the film
- Traditional Chinese: 空谷蘭
- Simplified Chinese: 空谷兰
Transcriptions
Standard Mandarin
- Hanyu Pinyin: Kōnggǔ lán
- Directed by: Zhang Shichuan
- Screenplay by: Bao Tianxiao
- Starring: Zhang Zhiyun; Yang Naimei
- Cinematography: Dong Keyi
- Production company: Mingxing Film Company
- Release date: 13 February 1926
- Country: Republic of China
- Language: Silent

Lonely Orchid (traditional Chinese: 空谷蘭; simplified Chinese: 空谷兰; pinyin: Kōnggǔ lán), also known as Orchid in the Valley, is a 1926 silent family drama film directed by Zhang Shichuan for the Mingxing Film Company. Adapted from a British novel via several intermediary translations, it follows a married couple who are separated after the husband falls for a seductress, but reunite when his disguised first wife returns. The film changed several settings and plot elements to better suit Chinese audiences, and was a commercial success upon release. Now lost, Lonely Orchid was remade by Mingxing in 1935.

== Plot ==
The happy married life of Lansun and Renzhu is destroyed when Lansun falls for Rouyun. Renzhu, spurned, leaves and is reported dead in a traffic accident. After Lansun and Rouyun are married, Renzhu disguises herself and attends the household. She treats her ill child. Later, her identity is revealed. She reconciles with Lansun, while Rouyun dies in an equestrian accident.

== Production ==
Lonely Orchid was directed by Zhang Shichuan for the Mingxing Film Company. The screenplay was produced by Bao Tianxiao, with cinematography handled by Dong Keyi. Intertitles were prepared by Zheng Zhengqiu, while publicity was handled by Song Chiping. The film starred Zhang Zhiyun in two roles, that of Renzhu and a servant, with Yang Naimei as the seductive Rouyun. Also featured were Zhu Fei, Zhao Chen, Wang Xianzhai, Song Chanhong, Ma Xuweibang, and Zheng Xiao.

Discussion of Lonely Orchid began as early as August 1925, when Mingxing and Bao began discussing rights. It was adapted from a British novel via a Japanese-language translation by Kuroiwa Shūroku, which itself had been translated into Chinese by Bao. The Chinese translation had found success in print, and stage performances had occurred throughout the 1910s; consequently, the film had an established audience. Scholars have differed in their assessment of the film's ultimate source. Lonely Orchid has been identified as stemming from Ellen Wood's 1861 novel East Lynne; in her history of Mingxing, Huang Xuelei argues that the original novel was actually Charlotte Mary Brame's A Woman's Error (1863), which bears a strong resemblance to Wood's work. Zheng Zhengqiu described Mingxing as interested in adapting the novel due to its critical treatment of such issues as love, family, and education, which advanced his desire to promote the conscience of society.

Although the basic synopsis for Lonely Orchid was completed within a week, it took until November to finish the screenplay. While printed translations had retained the novel's setting in the United Kingdom, the film was set entirely in China. Leicestershire, for instance, became Jiaxing; location shooting was also done in Hangzhou. Likewise, foreign elements were recast for this Chinese setting, with the main character gaining the family name Tao. Further modifications to the storyline included references to Chinese students abroad as well as rampant warlordism, both of which were more relevant to contemporary audiences than the references in the original novel.

== Release and reception ==
Lonely Orchid premiered at the Palace Theatre in Shanghai on 13 February 1926, the beginning of the Lunar New Year, having had a preview three days earlier. The film was twenty reels in length. Advertising for the film had begun several months earlier, with regular newspaper coverage allowing audiences to follow the progress of production. Critical reviews were mixed, with Hong Shen lauding the film's quality, Chen Yuan praising its cinematography, and the literary critic Chen Junqing writing that he had left mid-screening.

Initially running for two weeks, popular demand soon resulted in a second run for Lonely Orchid. Subsequent distribution efforts resulted in the film being shown throughout the Republic of China as well as in parts of Southeast Asia. Earnings from the film were reported at 132,000 yuan (equivalent to ¥14,000,000 in 2019).

Mingxing remade Lonely Orchid beginning in 1934. This sound film, which premièred on 3 February 1935, is extant. The 1926 silent film, however, has been lost. Its screenplay has survived, as have its intertitles.

== Works cited ==
- Huang, Xuelei (2014). Shanghai Filmmaking: Crossing Borders, Connecting to the Globe, 1922–1938. Leiden: Brill. ISBN 978-90-04-27933-9.
- Yeh, Emilie Yueh-yu; Tam, Enoch Yee-lok (2018). Yeh, Emilie Yueh-yu (ed.). Early Film Culture in Hong Kong, Taiwan, and Republican China: Kaleidoscopic Histories. University of Michigan Press. pp. 244–276. doi:10.1353/book.57846. ISBN 978-0-472-12344-5.
- Zhang Yu (張玉) (2018). 1920年代の中国における黒岩涙香野の花の受容 [The Reception of Kuroiwa Ruikou's No No Hana in China in the 1920s: Focusing on the Silent Film Lonely Orchid] (PDF). Border Crossings: The Journal of Japanese-Language Literature Studies (in Japanese). 6 (1): 147–163. doi:10.22628/bcjjl.2018.6.1.147. Archived from the original (PDF) on 9 March 2020.
