= Dan Duyu =

Chinese film director

Dan Duyu (但杜宇; 1897–1972), also romanized as Dan Do-yu, was a Chinese film director and cinematographer who directed more than 30 films from 1922 to 1952. He was married to film actress Yin Mingzhu (who starred in his 1927 film The Cave of the Silken Web). Their daughter Judy Dan appeared in many American films.
