= Yang Naimei =

Chinese actress

- 楊耐梅
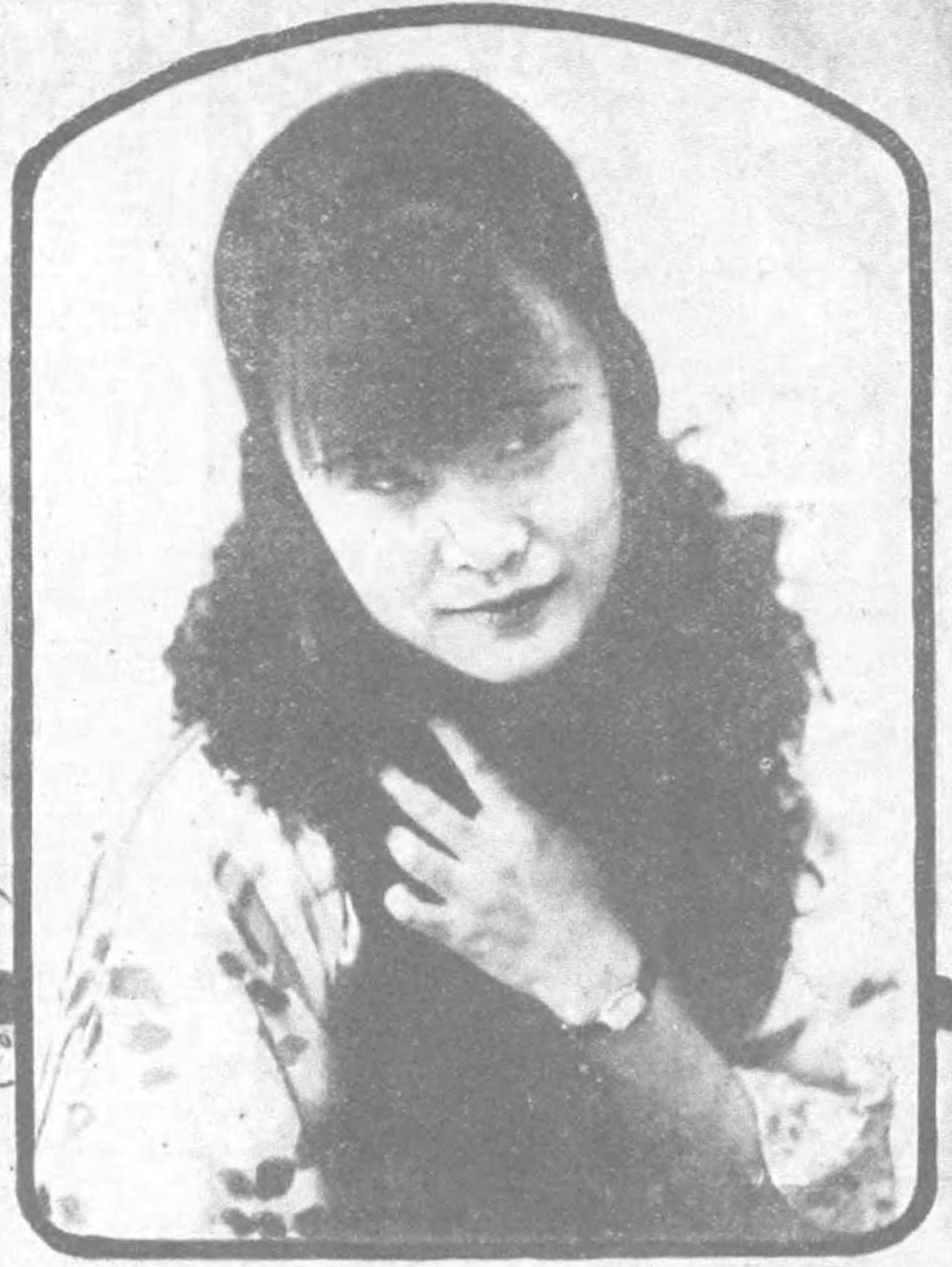
- Yang in 1926
- Born: 1904; China
- Died: December 27, 1960 (aged 55–56)
- Other names: Nai-Mei Yang, Naimei Yang
- Occupation: Actress
- Years active: 1924-1930s

Yang Naimei (Chinese: 楊耐梅; 1904 – December 27, 1960) was an actress of China's silent film era. She starred in such well-received films as The Soul of Yuli (1924), Lonely Orchid (1926), Spring Dream by the Lakeside (1927) and The Young Mistress' Fan (1928).

In 1926–28 Yang played lead roles in films which put her among the top-ranked Chinese film actresses of the 1920s.

== Career ==
Yang's breakthrough role was in The Soul of Yuli (1924), where she played a dissolute playgirl who wouldn't settle down after marriage. Yang then played lead roles in The Poor Children and Lured into Marriage.

In 1928 Yang opened the Naimei Film Company which produced one film in the same year, An Extraordinary Woman (Chinese: 奇女子). She would tour Nanyang (Chinese communities in modern-day Singapore, Malaysia and Indonesia) between 1929 and 1931 to promote the film. Yang retired from acting in the mid-1930s.
