= Wen Yimin =

Wen Yimin (文逸民 : Beijing, 1890 – Hong Kong, 22 December 1978) was a Chinese film director and actor. After 1959 he turned back to acting, with roles in numerous Hong Kong films until 1971.

== Filmography ==
As director, around 50 films

- Heroic Son and Daughter (1927) for Youlian (U. Lien) Film Company Shanghai, co-starring with future wife Fan Xuepeng
  - followed by four more sequels in the swordsman genre for Youlian
- Red Heroine (1929), available with English subtitles at the Chinese Film Classics website
- Shattered Dream in the Dance Hall Tianyi studio, starring Fan Xuepeng
- Mother

As actor, at least 56 films
