= Bu Wancang =

Chinese film director (1900–1974)

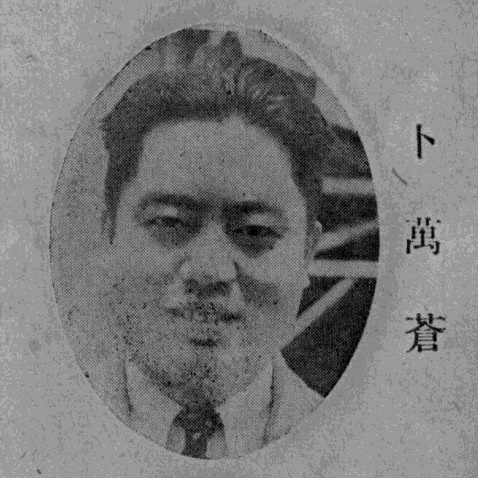
- Bu Wancang in 1937
- Born: 1 July 1900; Anhui, Qing Empire
- Died: 30 December 1973 (aged 73); British Hong Kong
- Other names: Richard Poh
- Occupation(s): Film director, screenwriter
- Years active: 1920s-1960s

Chinese name
- Traditional Chinese: 卜萬蒼
- Simplified Chinese: 卜万苍
Transcriptions
Standard Mandarin
- Hanyu Pinyin: Bǔ Wàncāng

Bu Wancang (July 1, 1900 – December 30, 1973), also known by his English name Richard Poh, was a prolific Chinese film director and screenwriter active between the 1920s and the 1960s. He was born in Anhui.

== Career ==
Originally a member of the Shanghai cinema scene, Bu worked for several studios before becoming a major director for the Mingxing Film Company. By 1931, Bu moved to Mingxing's rival, Lianhua, where he directed such films as Love and Duty (1931) and The Peach Girl (1931) (both with actress Ruan Lingyu).

As the war with Japan intensified Bu made several films with subtle patriotic themes, most notably 1939's Mulan Joins the Army. Once Japanese control over Shanghai was complete, however, Bu was eventually forced to make several propaganda films for the occupiers, notably Eternity in 1943. After the war, he was ostracized by his colleagues for these films, causing him to move to Hong Kong in 1948 where he continued to make films until his retirement.

== Filmography ==
=== As cinematographer ===
Year	English title	Chinese title	Director	Notes
1921	The Fathead	飯桶	Lu Shoulian	Lost
1921	Four Heroes Village	四傑村	Lu Shoulian	Lost
1924	A Poor Heart	人心	Gu Kenfu; Chen Shouyin	Lost
1925	Couple Suspects	新人的家庭	Ren Jinping	Lost
1925	Who's His Mother?	誰是母親	Gu Wuwei	Lost
1926	Hell and Heaven	地獄天堂	Gu Wuwei	Lost

=== As director ===
Year	English title	Chinese title	Notes
1926	Fiancée	未婚妻	Lost, also writer
1926	Resurrection	良心復活	Lost
1926	Why Not Her	玉潔冰清	Lost
1927	A Married Couple in Name Only	掛名的夫妻	Lost
1927	Dream by the Lake	湖邊春夢	Lost
1928	Ashes of the Lotus	美人關	Lost
1928	A Little Detective	小偵探	Lost
1929	Midget In-Laws	矮親家	Lost
1929	Two Midgets	兩矮爭風	Lost
1929	Revenge of an Actress	女伶復仇記	Lost
1929	Done with One Heart	同心劫	Lost, also actor
1930	Two Heroes	父子英雄	Lost
1930	The Sorrows of a Songstress	歌女恨	Lost
1930	Love and Hatred	海天情仇	Lost
1931	Love and Duty	戀愛與義務	
1931	A Spray of Plum Blossoms	一剪梅	
1931	The Peach Girl	桃花泣血記	Also writer
1932	Conscienceless	人道	Lost
1932	Another Dream of the Ancient Capital	續故都春夢	Lost
1933	Three Modern Women	三個摩登女性	Lost
1933	The Light of Maternal Instinct	母性之光	Also writer
1934	The Golden Times	黃金時代	
1935	Victory Song	凱歌	
1937	A New-Comer's Way	新人道	
1938	A Beggar Girl	乞丐千金	Also writer
1938	Diao Chan	貂蟬	Also writer
1938	Blood and Tears of Love	情天血淚	Also writer
1939	Mulan Joins the Army	木蘭從軍	
1940	Xi Shi	西施	
1940	Jade Hairpin	碧玉簪	Also writer
1940	Su Wu Herds Sheep	蘇武牧羊	
1940	Qin Liangyu	秦良玉	
1940	Autumn Rain of Xiaoxiang	瀟湘秋雨	Co-director
1941	Xiangsi Fortress	相思寨	
1941	Wild Rose	野薔薇	
1941	The Family	家	Co-director
1942	Compassion	博愛	Co-director
1942	Standard Lady	标准夫人	
1942	Seeing the Light Again	重見光明	
1942	Under the Peonies Flowers	牡丹花下	Also writer
1943	Two Generations of Women	兩代女性	
1943	Eternity	萬事流芳	Co-director
1943	Daughter of the Fisherman	漁家女	Also writer
1944	Homeward Bound	歸去來兮	Also writer
1944	Dream of the Red Chamber	紅樓夢	Also writer
1945	Flowers of the Land	大地之花	Also writer
1945	New Year Day	萬戶更新	Co-director
1948	The Soul of China	國魂	
1949	The Sins of Our Fathers	大涼山恩仇記	
1951	The Affairs of Diana	女人與老虎	
1952	Destroy!	毀滅	
1952	Portrait of a Lady	淑女圖	Also writer
1952	A Woman's Heart	婦人心	Also writer
1952	Sweet Memories	滿園春色	Co-director
1953	My Life	化身艷影	Also writer
1953	The Seven Maidens	七姊妹	Also writer
1953	The Song of Spring	戀春曲	
1954	The 72 Martyrs of Canton	碧血黃花	Co-director
1954	It Blossoms Again	再春花	Co-director and co-writer
1956	The Fisherman's Daughter	漁歌	Also writer
1956	Three Winning Smiles	唐伯虎與秋香	Co-director and co-writer
1956	The Long Lane	長巷	
1957	The Three Sisters	三姊妹	
1957	Miss Evening Sweet	夜來香	
1958	An Unforgettable Night	一夜風流	
1958	The Shoeshine Boy	擦鞋童	
1959	Stolen Love	偷情記	
1959	Bean Curd Queen	豆腐西施	
1960	Eve of the Wedding	待嫁春心	Also writer
1960	Nobody's Child	苦兒流浪記	
1960	My Daughter, My Daughter	兩代女性	Also writer
1960	The Bedside Story	同床異夢	
1960	Dreams Come True	喜相逢	
1960	Swindler's Delight	紅男綠女	
1960	Kiss Me Again	第二吻	
1961	The Lost Love	盲目的愛情	
1962	No Greater Love	吳鳳	
1963	Lady General Red Jade	梁紅玉	
1963	Lady of Lute	趙五娘	
1968	Lilac	紫丁香	
