= List of Chinese films of the 1930s =

This is a list of films produced in the Republican period of China ordered by year of release in the 1930s.

For an alphabetical listing of Chinese films see Category:Chinese films.

== 1930 ==
Title	Chinese Title	Director	Actors	Genre	Notability
A Red Egg	一個紅蛋	Cheng Bugao	Gong Jianong, Gao Qianping	Social criticism	
A Romantic Girl	浪漫女子	Cheng Bugao	Xuan Jinglin, Gong Jianong	Romance	
The Cave of the Silken Web II	續盤絲洞	Dan Duyu	Yin Mingzhu	Shenmo fantasy	Sequel to the 1927 film of the same title
Circus Girl	馬戲女	Wang Yuanlong	Zhou Wenzhu, Wang Cilong	Action	
Elder Brother's Romance	逃情的哥哥	Wang Cilong	Wang Cilong, Chen Yunshang	Drama	Alternate title: Elder Brother's Elopement
Hall of the Broken Zither	碎琴樓	Zheng Zhengqiu	Hu Die, Xia Peizhen, Zheng Xiaoqiu	Tragedy	
New Journey to the West	新西游記	Zhang Shichuan	Zheng Xiaoqiu, Xia Peizhen		Adapted from the classic novel Journey to the West
Nine Dragons Mountain	大破九龍山	Zhu Shouju	Ruan Lingyu, Zheng Jiduo	Action	Released in two parts
Peach Blossom Lake	桃花湖	Zheng Zhengqiu	Hu Die, Zheng Xiaoqiu	Crime	Released in two parts
The Pearl Cap	珍珠冠	Zhu Shouju	Ruan Lingyu, Zheng Jiduo	Crime/Romance	
The Road to Riches	黃金之路	Cheng Bugao	Zhou Wenzhu, Zhu Fei	Drama	Alternate title: The Golden Road
Spring Dream in the Old Capital	古城春夢	Sun Yu	Ruan Lingyu, Wang Ruilin, Lim Cho Cho		Ruan Lingyu's breakthrough role; also known as Remembrance of Peking or Reminiscences of Beijing
Suicide Contract	自殺合同	Zhu Shilin	Ruan Lingyu, Liu Jiqun	Comedy-Drama	Ruan's first film for the Lianhua Film Company. Directing debut for Zhu Shilin
Virtuous Mother from a Brothel	倡門賢母	Cheng Bugao	Xuan Jinglin, Xia Peizhen	Drama	
Wild Flowers	野草閑花	Sun Yu	Ruan Lingyu, Jin Yan		Alternate title: Wild Flowers Among the Weeds
Yang Naiwu	楊乃武與小白菜	Qiu Qixiang	Chen Yumei, Sun Min	Docudrama	Dramatization of the infamous late Qing dynasty case of Yang Naiwu and Little Cabbage

== 1931 ==
Title	Chinese Title	Director	Actors	Genre	Notability
A Couple in Life and Death	生死夫妻	Zhang Shichuan	Wang Xianzhai, Xuan Jinglin, Gong Jianong	Drama	
A Free Soul	自由魂	Wang Cilong	Tang Tianxiu, Zhou Wenzhu, Gao Zhanfei	Drama	Alternate title: The Bloody Crysanthemum (碧血黃花)
An Amorous History of the Silver Screen	銀幕艷史	Cheng Bugao	Xuan Jinglin, Xia Peizhen	Drama	This is a partially lost film about a woman's rise from prostitution to stardom from Mingxing Film Company. Released in two parts
Arsène Lupin	亞森·羅賓	Li Pingqian	Chen Yumei, Sun Min	Mystery	Adapted from the stories by Maurice Leblanc
Between Themselves	夫妻之間	Li Pingqian	Chen Yumei, Sun Min	Drama	
Blue Skies After the Rain	雨過天青	Xia Chifeng	Chen Qiufeng, Lin Ruxin	Drama	Filmed on location in Japan. First Chinese production with sound on film.
The Casebook of Sherlock Holmes	福爾摩斯偵探案	Li Pingqian	Li Pingqian, Chen Yumei	Mystery	Alternate title: Stories of Sherlock Holmes
Farewell to Yuren	玉人永別	Zheng Zhengqiu	Xuan Jinglin, Zheng Xiaoqiu	Tragedy	
The Flying General	飛將軍	Ren Pengnian	Wu Lizhu	Crime	
Heartaches	心痛	Yang Xiaozhong	Wan Laitian, Ding Ziming	Drama	
Heng Niang	恆娘	Shi Dongshan	Zhou Wenzhu, Tang Tianxiu, Zhu Fei	Fantasy	Adapted from a story of the same title in Strange Stories from a Chinese Studio
In Old Beijing	舊時京華	Zhang Shichuan	Wang Xianzhai; Zheng Xiaoqiu	Drama	Alternate title: Splendors of the Old Capital
Love and Duty	戀愛與義務	Bu Wancang	Ruan Lingyu, Jin Yan	Romance/Tragedy	Early Lianhua Film Company production, previously thought lost, a complete print was discovered in South America in the 1990s
Lucky Stars	銀星幸運	Zhang Shichuan	Zheng Xiaoqiu, Hu Die	Musical Review	
The Murderess	殺人的小姐	Tan Zhiyuan, Gao Lihen	Liang Saizhen, Yan Yuexian, Cai Chusheng	Mystery	
Oriental Nights	東方夜譚	Dan Duyu	Yin Mingzhu	Fantasy	Adapted from One Thousand and One Nights
The Peach Girl	桃花泣血記	Bu Wancang	Ruan Lingyu	Drama	
Pleasures of the Dance Hall	歌場春色	Li Pingqian, Qiu Qixiang, Shao Zuiweng	Xuan Jinglin, Chen Yumei	Drama	First sound film from the Tianyi Film Company, with several American technicians imported from Hollywood to assist and train Chinese personnel
Shadow of Red Tears		Zhang Shichuan	Hu Die, Zheng Xiaoqiu	Drama	Released in two parts
Shadow on the Window	窗上人影	Cheng Bugao	Xuan Jinglin, Gong Jianong	Mystery	
Sing-Song Girl Red Peony	歌女紅牡丹	Zhang Shichuan	Hu Die; Xia Peizhen		First Chinese sound film (wax discs)
The Singing Beauty	虞美人	Cheng Kengran	Xu Qinfang, Zhu Fei	Romance/Tragedy	
A Spray of Plum Blossoms	一剪梅	Bu Wancang	Ruan Lingyu, Jin Yan, Wang Cilong	Drama	
Spring in the Jade Palace	玉堂春	Zhuang Guojun	Ruan Lingyu	Drama	Adapted from two Peking operas
Struggle Between Love and Desire	愛欲之爭	Wang Cilong	Gao Zhanfei, Tang Tianxiu, Zhou Wenzhu	Drama	
Such a Paradise	如此天堂	Zhang Shichuan	Hu Die, Gong Jianong	Drama	Released in two parts
Three Heroes of the Wang Family		Wang Yuanlong	Wang Yuanlong, Tang Tianxiu	War	
Two Stars of the Milky Way	銀漢雙星	Shi Dongshan	Jin Yan		Also known as Two Stars of the Silver Screen
Unlucky to be Born a Daughter	不幸生為女兒身	Cheng Bugao	Gao Qianping	Drama	

== 1932 ==
Title	Chinese Title	Director	Actors	Genre	Notability
A Kindly Mother	慈母	Zhang Shichuan	Yan Yuexian, Wang Xianzhai	Drama	
A Lonely Bird	落霞孤鶩	Cheng Bugao	Hu Die, Gong Jianong	Drama	Adapted from the novel of the same title by Zhang Henshui
A Music Teacher	海外鵑魂	Jin Qingyu	Zi Luolan, Jin Yan	Drama	
A Young Actress	小女伶	Qiu Qixiang	Yuan Meiyun	Drama	
Beloved Enemy	可愛的仇敵	Cheng Bugao	Zheng Xiaoqiu, Liang Saizhen	Drama	
Facing the National Crisis	共赴國難	Cai Chusheng, Shi Dongshan, Sun Yu, Wang Cilong	Chen Yen-yen, Zheng Junli	War	
Fate in Tears and Laughter	啼笑因緣	Zhang Shichuan	Hu Die, Xia Peizhen, Wang Xianzai, Gong Jianong, Zheng Xiaoqiu	Romantic drama	
Hell at Sea	海上閻王	Wang Cilong	Wang Cilong, Zhou Wenzhu, Tang Tianxiu	Action	
Humanity	人道	Bu Wancang	Jin Yan, Lim Cho Cho	Drama	
Love and Death	愛與死	Cheng Bugao	Gao Qianping	Drama	
Love and Life	戀愛與生命	Tang Jie, Wang Jiting	Gong Jianong, Hu Ping		
Loving Blood of the Volcano	火山情血	Sun Yu	Li Lili, Zheng Junli	Drama	
Old Hate, New Sorrow	舊恨新仇	Li Pingqian	Gong Jianong, Ai Xia	Musical/Drama	
One Night of Luxury	一夜豪華	Shao Zuiweng	Chen Yumei, Hu Shan, Sun Mei	Drama	Adapted from the short story The Necklace by Guy de Maupassant
Pink Dream	粉紅色的夢	Cai Chusheng	Gao Zhanfei, Zheng Junli, Tan Ying	Drama	Also known as Dream in Pink
Poetry Written on a Banana Leaf	芭蕉葉上詩	Li Pingqian	Wang Renmei, Li Lili	Musical	
Regrets	失足恨	Dan Duyu	Yuan Congmei	Drama	Alternate title: Mistaken Marriage
South Seas Beauty	南海美人	Dan Duyu	Yin Mingzhu		
Spring Dream in the Old Capital II	續故都春夢	Bu Wancang	Ruan Lingyu, Jin Yan	Drama	Sequel to the 1931 release of the same title
Spring in the South	南國之春	Cai Chusheng	Gao Zhanfei, Chen Yen-yen	Drama	
Three Modern Women	三個摩登女性	Bu Wancang	Ruan Lingyu, Jin Yan	Drama	
Two Daughters of the Northeast	東北二女子	Li Pingqian	Hu Shan, Lu Lixia	War/Romance	Alternate title: Two Orphan Girls on the Battlefield (戰地二孤女)
Wild Rose	野玫瑰	Sun Yu	Jin Yan, Wang Renmei	Romance/Drama	

== 1933 ==
Title	Chinese Title	Director	Actors	Genre	Notability
A Modern Woman	現代一女性	Li Pingqian	Ai Xia, Sun Min		Lead actress Ai Xia also wrote the screenplay
A Movie Actress	一個女明星	Tang Xiaodan	Hu Shan		
A Waif	苦兒流浪記	Shao Zuiweng		Drama	Based on the novel Sans Famille by Hector Malot
A Woman's Life	生機	Shao Zuiweng	Chen Yumei	Drama	
Actress on the Way	健美之路	Chen Kengran	Xu Qinfang, Zheng Xiaoqiu		
An Isolated Army	孤軍	Chen Tian	Ye Juanjuan	War	
Bai Jinlong	白金龍	Tang Xiaodan		Romance	
Battlefield Adventures	戰地歷險記	Zhang Shichuan	Hu Die, Zheng Xiaoqiu. Gong Jianong	War	
Chicken and Duck	雞鴨夫妻	Wang Fuqing	Liu Chunshan, Gu Mengchi		
Children of Our Time	時代的女兒	Li Pingqian	Zhao Dan, Ai Xia	Drama	
Combat	肉搏	Hu Tu	Shu Xiuwen	Drama	
Consciousness	覺悟	Wen Yimin	Fan Xuepeng	Drama	
Cosmetics Market	肥分市場	Zhang Shichuan	Hu Die, Ai Xia		Early sound film
The Cries of Women	女性的吶喊	Shen Xiling	Wang Ying, Gong Jianong	Drama	
Dawn Over the Metropolis	都會的早晨	Cai Chusheng	Wang Renmei	Drama	
Daybreak	天命	Sun Yu	Li Lili, Gao Zhanfei	Drama	Lianhua Film Company production
Deep Sorrows	離恨天	Wang Yuanlong	Qian Siying	Tragedy	
Drifting	飄零	Tang Xiaodan	Hu Shan		Alternate title: Willow Catkins II
Fallen Angel	春風楊柳	Wang Fuqing	Yang Naimei, Xia Peizhen		
The Future	前程	Cheng Bugao, Zhang Shichuan	Xuan Jinglin, Sun Min	Drama	
Light of Motherhood	母性之光	Bu Wancang	Jin Yan, Lai Cheuk-Cheuk		
Little Toys	小玩意	Sun Yu	Ruan Lingyu, Li Lili	Drama	
Lost Love		Zhang Shichuan	Zhang Zhiyun, Yan Yuexian	Drama	
Love and Tears of a Tenant	鐵板紅淚錄	Hong Shen	Wang Ying	Drama	
Morning Glory	晨曦	Wu Wenchao		War	
Mother and Son	母與子	Tang Jie	Xuan Jinglin, Zheng Xiaoqiu		
National Existence		Tian Han	Shu Xiuwen		
New Year's Eve	除夕	Jiang Qifeng	Liu Jiqun, Chen Yen-yen	Drama	
Night in the City	城市之夜	Fei Mu	Ruan Lingyu, Jin Yan	Drama	Fei Mu's directorial debut, now lost. Alternate title: City Nights
Oppression	壓迫	Gao Lihen	Gong Jianong, Xia Peizhen	Social Criticism	
Remnants of Spring	殘春	Zhang Shichuan	Xu Lai, Zheng Xiaoqiu		
Romance in Spring	春水情波	Zheng Zhengqiu	Hu Die, Sun Min	Drama	
Sister's Tragedy	姊姊的悲劇	Gao Lihen, Wang Jiting	Zheng Xiaoqiu, Hu Ping		
Spring Dream of the Lute	琵琶春怨	Li Pingqian	Gao Qianping, Zheng Xiaoqiu		
Spring Silkworms	春蠶	Cheng Bugao	Ai Xia	Leftist Drama	Mingxing Film Company production, an adaptation of the Mao Dun-penned short story
Stirrings of Love	春潮	Zheng Yingshi	Gao Zhanfei, Wang Renmei	Drama	
Struggle	奮斗	Shi Dongshan	Chen Yen-yen	Drama	
Such Heroes	如此英雄	Zhuang Guojun	Han Langen, Liu Jiqun, Tan Ying	Comedy	
Sweetgrass Beauty	香草美人	Chen Kengran	Xie Yunqing, Xia Peizhen	Drama	
Vicious Neighbors	惡鄰	Ren Pengnian	Wu Lizhu	Drama	Originally about 100 minutes running time, 42 minutes still exist
Wild Torrent	狂流	Cheng Bugao	Hu Die, Xia Peizhen, Gong Jianong	Drama	
Willow Catkins	飛絮	Shao Zuiweng	Yuan Meiyun		

== 1934 ==
Title	Chinese Title	Director	Actors	Genre	Notability
24 Hours in Shanghai	上海二十四小時	Shen Xiling	Zhao Dan, Gu Lanjun, Gu Meijun	Drama	
A Beautiful Night	良宵	Yang Xiaozhong	Tan Ying, Tang Tianxiu		
A Brief Life	路柳牆花	Xu Xinfu	Hu Die, Xuan Jinglin	Drama	
A Woman Prisoner	女犯	Wang Tianbei	Xu Suzhen	Drama	
The Big Road	大路	Sun Yu	Jin Yan, Li Lili	Drama	
Bigamy	重婚	Wu Cun	Gao Zhanfei, Yan Yuexian, Gao Qianping	Drama	
Body Building	健美運動	Dan Duyu			
Buried With Flowers	百花洲	Wen Yimin	Chen Yumei, Ye Qiuxin	Tragedy	
The Classic for Girls	女兒經	Zhang Shichuan, Yao Sufeng, Zheng Zhengqiu, Xu Xingfu, Li Pingqian, Chen Kengran, Shen Xiling, Cheng Bugao	Ensemble cast	Comedy/Drama	Collection of short stories against the background of a women's class reunion. Aka: A Bible for Girls
Cotton Blossom Village	飛花村	Zheng Yingshi	Gao Zhanfei, Hu Ping	Drama	
Dawn	黎明	Wang Yuanlong, Shao Zuiweng	Wang Yuanlong, Fan Xuepeng		
The Doctrine of Women	婦道	Chen Kengran	Xu Qinfang		
Elapse	似水流年	Gao Lihen	Hu Shan; Zhao Dan		
Enemies of Women	女性的仇敵	Chen Kengran	Xu Qinfang, Zhao Dan		
Exhibition	展覽會	Chen Kengran	Xia Peizhen, Sun Min		
Flame of Youth	青春之火	Qiu Qixiang	Ye Qiuxin, Chen Yumei		
Flames	烈焰	Hu Rui	Hu Ping	Drama	
Flowers in the Storm	暴雨梨花	Ma-Xu Weibang	Gao Zhanfei, Chen Yen-yen	Drama	
Give Back My Home	還我山河	Wang Cilong	Liang Saizhen, Gao Zhanfei		
Go Northwest	道西北去	Cheng Bugao	Xu Lai, Gong Jianong		
The Goddess	神女	Wu Yonggang	Ruan Lingyu	Drama	Distributed by the Lianhua Film Company
Golden Age	黃金時代	Bu Wancang	Jin Yan, Yin Mingzhu	Drama	
Goodbye, Shanghai	再會吧，上海	Zheng Yunbo	Ruan Lingyu, Zhang Yi		
Homecoming	歸來	Zhu Shilin	Ruan Lingyu, Gao Zhanfei	Drama	
Hot-Blooded Youth	熱血青年	Tang Jie	Wang Yuanlong, Ye Qiuxin	Drama	
Iron Bird	鐵鳥	Yuan Congmei	Chen Yen-yen, Gao Zhanfei	Romance/War	
Joyous Enemies		Qiu Qixiang	Chen Yumei		Based on the novel of the same title by Zhang Henshui
Just One Night	春宵曲	Wen Yimin	Ye Qiuxin	Drama	
Kids	人間仙子	Dan Duyu	Yuan Meiyun	Drama	
Kindred Feelings	骨肉之恩	Jiang Qifeng	Ma-Xu Weibang, Chen Yen-yen		
Life	人生	Fei Mu	Ruan Lingyu		
Lucky Land	吉地	Shao Zuiweng	Chen Yumei, Tian Fang		
Mr. Wang	王先生	Shao Zuiweng	Tang Jie	Comedy	First in a series of popular live-action comedies based on the cartoon character created by Ye Qianyu
Mrs. Mai	麥夫人	Zhang Shichuan	Hu Die		Alternate titles: 美德夫人 and 紅船外史
Mutual Hatred	同仇	Cheng Bugao	Wang Ying	Drama	
Never Give Up	泰山鴻毛	Zhang Shichuan	Gong Jianong, Xu Lai	Drama	
Orchid in an Empty Valley	空谷蘭	Zhang Shichuan	Hu Die, Gao Zhanfei	Drama	Sound remake of the 1926 silent of the same title.
Perfumed Snowy Sea	香雪海	Fei Mu	Ruan Lingyu, Gao Zhanfei	Drama	
Plunder of Peach and Plum	桃李劫	Ying Yunwei	Yuan Muzhi	Drama	Diantong Film Company production.
Queen of Sports	體育皇后	Sun Yu	Li Lili		
Raging Waves of the China Sea	中國海的怒潮	Yueh Feng	Yuan Meiyun	Drama	
Reborn Flowers	再生花	Zheng Zhengqiu	Hu Die	Drama	Lost second part of Twin Sisters
Renzhu	紉珠	Shao Zuiweng, Gao Lihen	Fan Xuepeng		
Romance of Hua Mountain	華山艷史	Cheng Bugao	Xu Lai, Gong Jianong		
Romance on the Stage	台艷史	Xue Juexian	Xue Juexian	Romance	Alternate title: 璇宮艷史
Salt Tide	鹽潮	Xu Xinfu	Hu Die	Drama	
The Shining Path		Zheng Zhenduo	Zheng Junli, Tan Ying	Drama	
Song of the Fishermen	漁光曲	Cai Chusheng	Wang Renmei	Drama	First Chinese film to win an award at an international film festival (the Moscow Film Festival)
Three Sisters	三姊妹	Li Pingqian	Zhao Dan, Hu Die		Adapted from a novel by Japanese author Kan Kikuchi
Twin Sisters	姊妹花	Zheng Zhengqiu	Hu Die	Drama	Exists, but second part (Reborn Flowers) is lost
Two to One	二對一	Zhang Shichuan	Gong Jianong, Gao Qianping	Drama	
Virtuous Wife	賢惠夫人	Min Mo	Xu Suzhen, He Zhigang	Drama	
The Wind	風	Wu Cun	Gao Zhanfei, Tan Ying	Drama	
Women	女人	Shi Dongshan	Li Minghui, Hu Ping	Tragedy	
Year of Plenty	豐年	Li Pingqian	Ai Xia	Drama	Alternate title: Golden Valley (黃金谷)
Youth	青春	Zhu Shilin	Tan Ying, Zhu Fei		

== 1935 ==
Title	Chinese Title	Director	Actors	Genre	Notability
A Beauty's Heart	美人心	Xu Xinfu	Hu Die	Drama	
A Hero of Our Time	時勢英雄	Ying Yunwei	Hu Ping, Shang Guanwu	Drama	Alternate title: Businessmen in Wartime
An Abandoned Woman	秋扇明燈	Tan Youliu	Li Lili	Drama	
At the Foot of E Mei Mountain	峨眉山下	Wan Laitian		War	
The Beauty's Favor	美人恩	Wen Yimin			Adapted from a novel by Zhang Henshui
The Beginning of Life	人之初	Shi Dongshan	Wei Heling, Yuan Meiyun		Alternate title: Old People (老人)
Big Family	大家庭	Zhang Shichuan	Ensemble cast		
The Boatman's Daughter	船家女	Shen Xiling	Gao Zhanfei, Xu Lai	Drama	
Brothers	兄弟行	Cheng Bugao	Hu Die, Gao Zhanfei		
The Carefree Gentlemen	無愁君子	Shen Fu	Han Langen, Liu Jiqun	Comedy	
Cityscape	都市風光	Yuan Muzhi	Lan Ping, Gu Menghe, Zhou Boxun	Comedy/Musical	
End of Spring		Wu Cun	Xu Lai, Gong Jianong	War	
Fang Yunying	方芸英	Le Jiyun	Hu Shan, Wei Heling		
Four Sisters	四姊妹	Yang Xiaozhong	Liang Saizhen		Featured the Liang Sisters, a popular 1930s stage and club act
Fragrance of the Night	夜來香	Cheng Bugao	Hu Die, Zhao Dan		
Hard Struggle	堅苦的奮斗	Gao Lihen	Fan Xuepeng		
Homesick	鄉愁	Shen Xiling		Drama	
Human Relations	人倫	Li Pingqian	Gong Jianong, Zheng Xiaoqiu	Drama	Alternate title: Homeless (無家可歸)
The Jadeite Horse	翡翠馬	Xu Xinfu	Wang Zhengxin, Yan Yuexian	Crime	
The Legend of the Taiping Heavenly Kingdom	紅羊豪俠傳	Yang Xiaozhong	Tong Yuejuan		
Life's Sad Song	生之哀歌	Yang Hansheng	Li Minghui, Wang Yin	Drama	
Little Angel	小天使	Wu Yonggang			
Loyal Patriots	熱血忠魂	Zhang Shichuan, Wu Cun, Zheng Zhengqiu, Xu Xinfu, Li Pingqian, Shen Xiling, Cheng Bugao		Drama	Alternate titles: Spirit of the People (民族魂), Loyal Heroes (熱血英雄)
Mother	母親	Wen Yimin	Fan Xuepeng	Drama	
National Customs	國風	Luo Mingyou, Zhu Shilin	Ruan Lingyu, Zheng Junli	Drama	Ruan Lingyu's final film
New Women	新女性	Cai Chusheng	Ruan Lingyu, Zheng Junli	Drama	
The New Peach Blossom Fan	新桃花扇	Ouyang Yuqian			Early Xinhua Film Company production
The Night Before the Wedding	新婚的前夜	Dan Duyu	Li Minghui, Yuan Congmei		
The Peach Blossom Dream	桃花夢	Dan Duyu	Yin Mingzhu	Allegory	
Refugees	逃亡	Yueh Feng	Yuan Meiyun		
Settle Down by the Han River	寒江落雁	Ma-Xu Weibang	Chen Yen-yen	Drama	
Song of China	天倫	Fei Mu, Luo Mingyou	Zheng Junli	Drama	New Life Movement film; also known as Filial Piety
Sons and Daughters in a Time of Storm	風雲兒女	Xu Xingzhi	Yuan Muzhi, Wang Renmei	Drama/War	Also known as Children of Troubled Times; Origin of the Chinese National Anthem
Spirit of Freedom	自由神	Situ Huimin	Wang Ying	Drama	Also known as The Goddess of Freedom
The Tempest	暴風雨	Yuan Congmei	Yuan Meiyun, Wei Heling	Drama	Alternate title: The Martyr (犧牲者)
Three Daughters-in-Law	三個媳婦	Wang Tianbei	Xu Suzhen, He Zhigang	Drama	
Three Girls	重歸	Gao Lihen		Drama	
Troubled Sisters		Wu Wenchao	Hu Shan, Xia Peizhen	Drama	
The Wedding Night	花燈之夜	Yueh Feng	Yuan Meiyun		
Women as Vipers	蛇蠍美人	Yang Xiaozhong	Zhang Yi, Chen Yen-yen	Drama	Alternate title: Whirlpool
Young Auntie	小姨	Min Qian	Xia Peizhen	Drama	

== 1936 ==
Title	Chinese Title	Director	Actors	Genre	Notability
A Little Orphan Girl	小孤女	Yang Xiaozhong	Chen Juanjuan, Zhang Zhizhi	Drama	
A Night of Madness	狂歡之夜	Shi Dongshan	Gu Eryi, Hu Ping, Jin Shan, Zhou Xuan	Drama	Adapted from The Government Inspector by Nikolai Gogol
Back to Nature	道自然去	Sun Yu	Jin Yan, Li Lili		Adapted from the 1902 stage play The Admirable Crichton
The Battle Between Peach and Plum	桃李爭艷	Li Pingqian	Ye Qiuxin, Gu Lanjun		
Blood on Wolf Mountain	狼山喋血記	Fei Mu	Lan Ping, Li Lili	Drama	"National Defense" film
By the Huangpu River	黃浦江邊	Shao Zuiweng	Chen Qiufeng, Tang Jie		
The Desert Island	浪淘沙	Wu Yonggang	Jin Yan, Zhang Zhizhi	Action	Alternate title: Gold and Sand
The Diamond Case	金剛鑽	Xu Xinfu	Gu Lanjun, Wang Zhengxin	Crime	
Downtrodden Peach Blossom	劫後桃花	Zhang Shichuan	Hu Die, Gao Zhanfei, Shu Xiuwen		
Family Members	父母子女	Hu Xinling	Gong Qiuxia	Drama	
Flowers and Grass	花花草草	Gao Lihen			
Girl in an Isolated City	孤城烈女	Wang Cilong	Chen Yen-yen, Zheng Junli		
The Graduate		Dan Duyu	Bai Hong	Romance	
Grave-Sweeping Day	清明時節	Ouyang Yuqian	Li Minghui, Zhao Dan		
The Guangling Tide	廣陵潮	Chen Kengran	Yuan Meiyun, Wang Yin		
Hai Tanghong	海堂紅	Zhang Shichuan	Bai Yushuang, Wang Xianzhai	Musical/Drama	Alternate title: Red Begonia
Happiness is at the Door	喜臨門	Yueh Feng	Zhou Xuan	Romance	
Little Lingzi	小玲子	Cheng Bugao	Tan Ying	Drama	
Lost Lambs	迷途的羔羊	Cai Chusheng		Drama	Deals with the sufferings and tragic fates of street urchins
Mother Love	母愛	Jin Qingyu	Lim Cho Cho	Drama	
Mr. Wang's Marvelous Heroism	王先生奇俠傳	Zuo Ming	Tang Jie	Comedy	
New and Old Shanghai	新舊上海	Cheng Bugao	Ensemble cast	Drama	
Night Club	夜會	Li Pingqian	Gu Lanjun, Gong Jianong		
Soaring Aspirations	壯志凌雲	Wu Yonggang	Jin Yan, Wang Renmei	Drama	
Song of Hatred	長恨歌	Shi Dongshan	Mei Xi; Wang Renmei		Alternate title: Human Feelings (人情)
Song of Triumph	凱歌	Bu Wancang	Yuan Meiyun, Wang Yin		
Spring Dream in the Plum Garden	桃源春夢	Yang Xiaozhong	Han Langen, Liu Jichun	Comedy	
Spring Flowers	春之花	Wu Cun	Gao Zhanfei, Yan Yuexian		
Tomboy	化身姑娘	Fang Peilin	Yuan Meiyun	Drama/Romance	Released in two parts
The Treasure Map	百寶圖	Yueh Feng	Wang Yin, Zhou Xuan	Adventure	
Two Little Sisters	小姊妹	Xu Fenling	Yuan Meiyun, Wang Yin		
Unchanged Heart in Life and Death	生死同心	Ying Yunwei	Yuan Muzhi, Chen Boer	Drama	
Women's Rights	女權	Zhang Shichuan	Hu Die, Zhao Dan	Drama	Alternate title: Love's Runaway (愛情的逃亡者)

== 1937 ==
Title	Chinese Title	Director	Actors	Genre	Notability
A Match Made in Heaven	天作之合	Shen Fu	Han Langen, Bai Lu	Drama	
Always Keep Smiling	永遠的微笑	Wu Cun	Hu Die, Gong Jianong, Gong Qiuxia	Drama	
The Battle of Shanghai		Lai Man-wai		Documentary	Collection of documentary footage of the invasion of Shanghai by Japan, as filmed by Lai Manwai and others.
Crossroads	十字街頭	Shen Xiling	Zhao Dan, Bai Yang	Drama	Early sound film
The Disappearing Corpse		Xu Xinfu	Xu Xinyuan, Gu Meijun	Mystery	First of the Chinese-made Charlie Chan movies
Dream Universe	夢裡乾坤	Cheng Bugao	Tan Ying, Shu Xiuwen		Alternate titles: Heaven and Earth in a Dream; Long Night, Many Dreams (夜長夢多)
Flexible Girls	彈性女兒	Chen Kengran	Lu Ming, Yan Yuexian	Drama	
Flight by Night	夜奔	Cheng Bugao	Mei Xi, Tan Ying		
Flower of Society	社會之花	Zhang Shichuan	Bai Yang, Gong Jianong	Drama	
Four Daughters	四千金	Wu Cun	Bai Yang, Gong Jianong	Drama	
The Free World	自由天地	Shen Fu	Chen Yen-yen, Liu Qiong	Drama	
Full of Vim and Vigor	生龍活虎	Xu Xinfu	Wang Jiting, Gu Lanjun	Crime	
The General's Daughter	將軍之女	He Mengfu	Lai Cheuk-Cheuk	War	
Gold-Plated City	鍍金的城	Fei Mu			Also known as The Gilded City
The Lost Pearl	人海遺珠	Zhu Shilin	Li Lili, Liu Qiong	Drama	
Martyrs of the Northern Front	北戰場精忠錄	Fei Mu			
The Money Tree	搖錢樹	Tan Youliu	Shu Xiuwen	Drama	Adapted from the Chinese stage version of Juno and the Paycock
Mother's Secrets	母親的秘密	Zhang Shichuan	Sun Min, Gong Jianong		
Murder in the Oratory	斬經堂	Fei Mu		Opera	
Mysterious Flower	神秘之花	Yueh Feng	Bai Yang	Crime	
New Year's Coin	壓歲前	Zhang Shichuan	Hu Rongrong	Drama	Also known as New Year's Gift
Night Rain by the Xiang River	瀟湘夜雨	Wang Cilong	Gao Zhanfei, Diao Banhua	Romance	
Secret Code	秘電碼	Various	Gao Zhanfei	War	
So Busy	如此繁華	Ouyang Yuqian	Li Lili		
Song at Midnight	夜半歌聲	Ma-Xu Weibang	Jin Shan, Gu Menghe	Horror	A Chinese adaptation of Phantom of the Opera
Song of a Loving Mother	慈母曲	Zhu Shilin, Luo Mingyou	Ensemble cast	Drama	
Soul and Body Gate	靈肉之門	Zhong Shigen	Lim Cho Cho		
Spring Arrives Everywhere	春到人間	Sun Yu	Chen Yen-yen, Mei Xi		
Street Angel	馬路天使	Yuan Muzhi	Zhao Dan, Zhou Xuan	Drama	
Strange Case in an Ancient Pagoda	古塔奇案	Zhang Shichuan	Wang Xianzhai, Gong Qiuxia	Crime	
Symphony of Lianhua	聯華交響曲	Various	Ensemble cast	Anthology	Collection of short films by the Lianhua studio's directors, and featuring Lianhua's top acting talents
Unexpected Luck	飛來福	Yang Xiaozhong	Han Langen, Liu Jiqun	Comedy	
Vistas of Art	藝海風光	Various	Ensemble cast		Three short stories with performing arts settings: movies <<電影城>>, theater <<話劇團>>, dance <<歌舞班>>
Wang Laowu	王老五	Cai Chusheng	Wang Cilong, Lan Ping	Drama	Alternate title: Fifth Brother Wang
Youth on the March	青年進行曲	Shi Dongshan	Shi Chao, Hu Ping	Drama	

== 1938 ==
Title	Chinese Title	Director	Actors	Genre	Notability
The Beggar's Daughter	乞丐千金	Bu Wancang	Chen Yen-yen, Mei Xi	Romance	
Diao Chan	貂蟬	Bu Wancang	Gu Lanjun, Jin Shan	Historical	Xinhua Film Company production, also known as The Sable Cicada
Eight Hundred Heroes	八白壯士	Ying Yunwei	Yuan Muzhi, Chen Boer	War	Dramatic interpretation of the Defense of Sihang Warehouse
Fight to the Last	熱血忠魂	Yuan Congmei	Li Lili, Gao Zhanfei	Action	"Resistance film," made in unoccupied territory. Alternate title: Loyal Patriots
The Lady of the Camellias	茶花女	Li Pingqian	Yuan Meiyun, Liu Qiong	Drama	Adapted from The Lady of the Camellias by Alexandre Dumas fils
Love and Duty	戀愛與義務	Bu Wancang	Jin Yan, Yuan Meiyun	Drama	Sound remake of the 1931 silent of the same title, with Jin Yan reprising his role. Original title: Unexpected Tears of Blood (情天血淚)
Melancholy Hatred	離恨天	Wu Yonggang	Wang Renmei, Liu Qiong	Romance	Alternate English titles: Bitter Separation, A Sailor's Love
The Pearl Tunic	珍珠衫	Xu Xinfu	Xu Xinyuan, Gu Meijun	Mystery	A Charlie Chan mystery
Pirates of the Yellow Sea	黃海大盜	Wu Yonggang	Wang Renmei, Gao Zhanfei	Action	Alternate title: Pirates of the Yellow River
Protect Our Land	保衛我們的土地	Shi Dongshan	Wei Heling, Shu Xiuwen	War	
Save Her Mother	歌兒救母記	Zhang Shichuan	Gong Qiuxia, Shu Shi	Drama	
Stars Around the Moon	三星伴月	Fang Peilin	Zhou Xuan		
Sunrise	日出	Yueh Feng	Yuan Meiyun, Lu Luming	Drama	Adapted from the stage play of the same title by Cao Yu

== 1939 ==
Title	Chinese Title	Director	Actors	Genre	Notability
A Dancing Girl	紅粉飄零	Chen Kengran	Lu Ming, Gong Jianong	Drama	
A Money-Colored World	金銀世界	Li Pingqian	Gu Lanjun, Liu Qiong		
All Quiet in the Pagoda	荒塔沉冤	Yang Xiaozhong	Chen Yen-yen, Tong Yuejuan	Fantasy	Remake of the 1926 silent, White Snake (白蛇傳)
Bloody Battle in an Ancient City		Xu Suling		War	
Children of China	中華兒女	Shen Xiling	Zhao Dan, Bai Yang		Film format is that of a prologue and 4 short stories
Defending Our Home Village	保家鄉	He Feiguang		War	"National defense" film
The Empress Wu Tse-tien	武則天	Fang Peilin	Bai Hong	Drama/Historical	
The Good Husband	好丈夫	Shi Dongshan	Shu Xiuwen	War	
Groans and Struggles	碧玉雄心	Yueh Feng	Yuan Meiyun, Wang Yin	War	"National defense" film
Lady Meng Jiang	孟姜女	Wu Cun	Zhou Xuan		Remake of the 1926 silent of the same title
The Leper Girl	麻瘋女	Ma-Xu Weibang	Tan Ying	Horror	
Li Sanniang	李三娘	Zhang Shichuan	Zhou Xuan, Shu Shi		
Mother and Daughter	雲裳仙子	Yueh Feng	Chen Yunshang		Remake of 1933's Light of Motherhood
Mulan Joins the Army	木蘭從軍	Bu Wancang	Chen Yunchang	Historical/War	Solitary Island period film
The New Hell	新地獄	Wu Cun	Zhou Xuan		
The Radio Station Murder	播音台大血案	Xu Xinfu	Gong Qiuxia, Xu Xinyuan, Gu Meijun	Mystery	A Charlie Chan mystery
Sexy Devil	欲魔	Yueh Feng	Tan Ying	Drama	
Singing Through Tears	歌聲淚痕	Wu Cun	Gong Jianong	Musical	
Three Chinese Swordsmen	中國三劍客	Chen Yiqing	Han Langen	Action/Comedy	Alternate title: Three Swordsmen
Visiting Shanghai After 60 Years	六十年後上海灘	Yang Xiaozhong	Han Langen, Liu Jiqun	Fantasy	
Wang Baochuan	王寶釧	Wu Cun	Diao Banhua	Drama/Historical	
The Young Mistress's Fan	少奶奶的扇子	Li Pingqian	Yuan Yunmei		Remake of the 1928 silent of the same title

== Mainland Chinese film production totals ==
Year	Total Films
1930	117
1931	87
1932	62
1933	89
1934	82
1935	50
1936	46
1937	39
1938	41
1939	52

== See also ==
- Cinema of China
- Best 100 Chinese Motion Pictures as chosen by the 24th Hong Kong Film Awards

== Sources ==
- 中国影片大典 Encyclopaedia of Chinese Films. 1905-1930, 故事片·戏曲片. (1996). Zhong guo ying pian da dian: 1905-1930. Beijing: 中国电影出版社 China Movie Publishing House. ISBN 7-106-01155-X
- 中国影片大典 Encyclopaedia of Chinese Films. 1931-1949.9, 故事片·戏曲片. (2005). Zhong guo ying pian da dian: 1931-1949.9. Beijing: 中国电影出版社 China Movie Publishing House. ISBN 7-106-02414-7
