= An Amorous History of the Silver Screen =

1931 romantic drama film by Cheng Bugao

- Traditional Chinese: 銀幕艷史
- Simplified Chinese: 银幕艳史
Transcriptions
Standard Mandarin
- Hanyu Pinyin: Yínmù Yànshǐ
- Wade–Giles: Yin^{2}mu^{4} Yan^{4}shih^{3}
- Directed by: Cheng Bugao
- Written by: Zheng Zhengqiu
- Starring: Xuan Jinglin; Xia Peizhen
- Cinematography: Dong Keyi
- Production company: Mingxing Film Company
- Release date: 26 February 1931
- Running time: 18 reels
- Country: Republic of China
- Language: Silent

An Amorous History of the Silver Screen (simplified Chinese: 银幕艳史; traditional Chinese: 銀幕艷史; pinyin: Yínmù Yànshǐ) is a 1931 film in two parts directed by Cheng Bugao for the Mingxing Film Company. Starring Xuan Jinglin, it follows a courtesan who rises to stardom in the Shanghai film industry, endangers her position for romance, and ultimately decides to earn an independent living through acting. This film, which used Mingxing's studios as part of its setting, has been read as a metafilm featuring biographic elements. Part of the film has been lost, with only 52 minutes of the second part surviving.

== Plot ==
The treaty port of Shanghai develops into a city of skyscrapers and paved streets. A film industry emerges, as does a large pleasure quarters.

The courtesan Wang Fengzhen is slapped by a client after arriving late, and he mocks her tears by telling her she could be the next Lillian Gish. She decides to enrol with a major film company and soon gains recognition for her talent and range. She gains the attentions of the wealthy Fang Shaomei, who showers her with gifts and distracts her from her career. The two decide to cohabitate, but Wang begins to lose her prominent place in cinema.

Over time, Fang becomes increasingly indifferent, finding pleasure in the attentions of a dancing girl. Wang follows her paramor to a hotel and confronts him; when he is unrepentant, she swears to take control of her life and live independently through movie stardom. Returning to the studio, Wang is warmly received. During a tour she is exposed to the updated studio, where several films – including The Burning of the Red Lotus Temple and Shadow of Red Tears – are being shot. Wang rises to stardom, again gaining the attentions of Fang. The dancing girl, seeing the power of fame, auditions for a role in a new film.

== Production ==
An Amorous History of the Silver Screen was directed by Cheng Bugao for the Mingxing Film Company. Cinematography was handled by Dong Keyi, while the intertitles were provided by Zheng Zhengqiu. Xuan Jinglin took the starring role of Wang Fengzhen. Elements of the film were biographic; as with Wang Fengzhen, Xuan had been a courtesan before being discovered by Mingxing co-founder Zhang Shichuan, with her contract bought out by the studio. After portraying a wide range of roles, she had entered a cohabitational relationship with a local entrepreneur, leaving it in 1930. The dancing girl was played by Xia Peizhen. Other roles were taken by Tan Zhiyuan, Wang Zhengxin, Xiao Ying, and Liang Saizhen.

In her exploration of metafilm in early Chinese cinema, Kristine Harris positioned An Amorous History of the Silver Screen within a genre of films about films; this also included the United Photoplay Service's Two Stars in the Milky Way (Shi Dongshan, 1931) and the Tianyi Film Company's The Female Movie Star (1926). This was not Mingxing's first film to deal with the theme. The company had showcased its studios in its first film, The King of Comedy Visits Shanghai (1922), and explored stardom in A Passionate Actress (1926).

Mingxing served as the set for An Amorous History of the Silver Screen's studio tour, showcasing itself as a "magic workshop of virtual reality" that used modern lighting, extravagant set-pieces and innovative special effects. These elements are presented in what the sinologist Christopher G. Rea characterizes as a "fun" manner, and include the synchronized application of make-up as well as efforts to control extras. Such elements are intertwined with other signifiers of modernity, including ballroom dancing and window shopping, as well as diverse elements of film culture such as fandom and stardom.

== Release and reception ==
An Amorous History of the Silver Screen premièred at the Palace Theatre in Shanghai on 17 February 1931. One viewer from Jilin, having seen the film at a local YMCA, wrote to Mingxing and thanked the company for the behind-the-scenes look at its production processes, from the creation of weather effects to the practice of martial arts.

An Amorous History of the Silver Screen is partially lost. The first part of the film, which details the rise of Shanghai cinema as well as the blossoming of Wang Fengzhen's romance, is not known to have survived. The second part of the film, which covers Wang's decision to regain her stardom and her independence, has survived at the China Film Archive. The full film was eighteen reels in length; the surviving fragment is 52 minutes.

Scholarship on early Chinese cinema has generally ignored An Amorous History of the Silver Screen. In an analysis, the film historian Zhang Zhen describes the film as providing a "self-conscious gesture at 'writing' film history" that created attraction through its blending of romance and promotion.

== Works cited ==
- Harris, Kristine (2012). "Two Stars on the Silver Screen: The Metafilm as Chinese Modern". In Henriot, Christian; Yeh, Wen-hsin (eds.). History in Images: Pictures and Public Space in Modern China. China Research Monograph. Vol. 66. Berkeley: Institute of East Asian Studies. pp. 191–244. ISBN 978-155729-155-4.
- Huang, Xuelei (2014). Shanghai Filmmaking: Crossing Borders, Connecting to the Globe, 1922–1938. China Studies. Vol. 29. Leiden: Brill. doi:10.1163/9789004279346. ISBN 978-90-04-27933-9.
- Luo, Ting (2024). "From Self-Promotion to Demystification: Self-Reflexivity and Realism in Chinese Cinema". Journal of Film and Video. 76 (4): 5–18. doi:10.5406/19346018.76.4.02.
- Rea, Christopher. "An Amorous History of the Silver Screen 影幕艷史 (1931)". Chinese Film Classics. Archived from the original on 19 May 2023.
- Zhang, Zhen (2005). An Amorous History of the Silver Screen: Shanghai Cinema, 1896–1937. Chicago: University of Chicago Press. ISBN 978-0-226-98238-0.
