= Spring Silkworms =

Novella by Mao Dun

Spring Silkworms (Chun Can) is a novella by the Chinese author Mao Dun about the experience of Chinese villagers engaging in sericulture.

== History ==
Mao Dun dates the story November 1, 1932. It is part of a trilogy, together with Autumn Harvest and Winter Ruin.

== Subject Matter and Themes ==
The major subject matter of Spring Silkworms is the difficulty villagers encounter in attempting to profit from their participation in the silk business. The story concludes, "Because they raised a crop of spring silkworms, the people in Old Tung Pao's village got deeper into debt."

A major theme of the story is the complexity the villagers face in dealing with inputs to the process (such as eggs, mulberry leaves, and equipment) and the loans they must take out to finance their activities. Complexity is added by the intrusion of foreign-owned silk processing plants ("filatures").

== Historical significance ==
Spring Silkworms deals with economic issues that came to be an important factor in the worldview of the Chinese Communist Party—and hence of the Chinese government after the establishment of the People's Republic of China.

== Comparative Perspective ==
Spring Silkworms bears comparison with other works of modern literature, particularly literature dealing with the lives of people living on China's economic margins.

The Good Earth by Pearl Buck describes the lives of Chinese peasants, and their economically precarious condition, during the period roughly contemporary with the story related in Spring Silkworms.

== English translations ==
Foreign Languages Press (Beijing) published an English translation by Sidney Shapiro in 1956, which includes the rest of the trilogy and other stories.

== Other Adaptations and Related Works ==
The work was adapted into a silent film in 1933 by director Cheng Bugao. It is a masterpiece of cinema starring Ai Xia, the first female screenwriter who starred in this film.
