= Little Toys =

Playthings
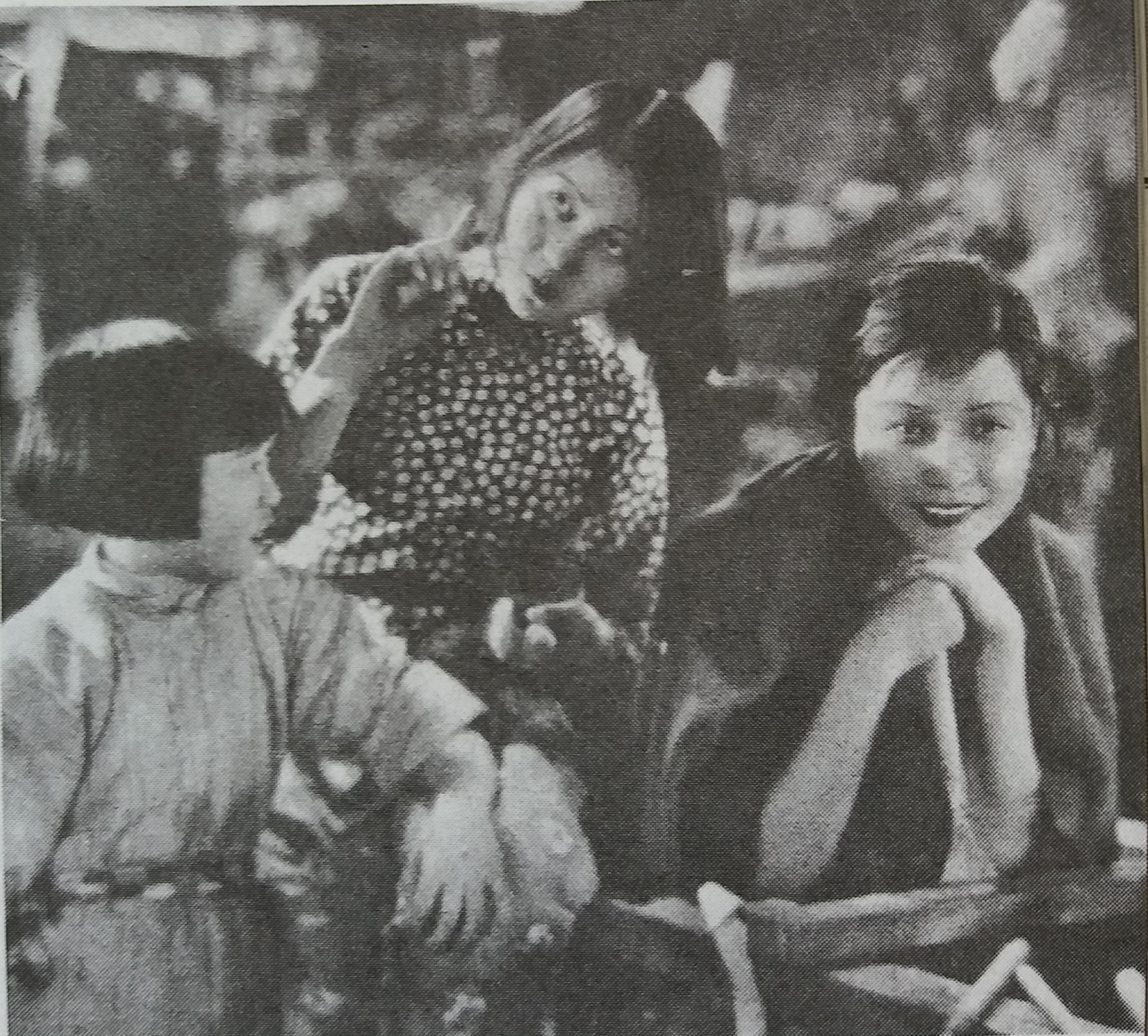
- Directed by: Sun Yu
- Written by: Sun Yu
- Produced by: Lo Ming-yau
- Starring: Ruan Lingyu; Li Lili
- Cinematography: Zhou Ke
- Production company: Lianhua Film Company
- Release date: January 3, 1933 (China)
- Running time: 103 minutes
- Country: China
- Languages: Silent film with Chinese intertitles

Playthings (Chinese: 小玩意; pinyin: Xiǎo wányì), also known as Little Toys or Small Toys, is a 1933 silent film directed by filmmaker Sun Yu. It is one of two films Sun Yu directed in 1933. (the other film being Daybreak). This film was released on October 10th, which was on the eve of National Day and prior to WWII. Sun Yu is also famously known for the films Wild Rose (1932) and Daybreak (1933). The film stars popular Chinese actress Ruan Lingyu, and was produced by the leftist film production company Lianhua Film Company. The film contains elements of drama, melodrama, war, westernization, motherhood and sacrifice. The story follows a village toy-maker, Sister Ye, who urges a group of villagers to continue making traditional playthings despite immense competition from foreign toy factories. Synonymous to many other films made during the same time period, Playthings is a patriotic propaganda film that expresses skepticism towards China's rapid urbanization and industrialization.

Having been made after Japan's invasion of China, Playthings is considered a Marxist war melodrama that contains strong nationalist sentiment while still reflecting Western influences. Today, the film is recognized as one of the best Chinese films of the 20th century.

== Cast ==
- Ruan Lingyu as Sister Ye (Ye Xiuxiu), a skilled toymaker and leader of a toymaking community in her village.
- Liu Jiqun as Old Ye, Sister Ye's husband and a toy vendor.
- Li Lili as Zhu'er ("Pearly"), Sister Ye's daughter and an aspiring toy designer.
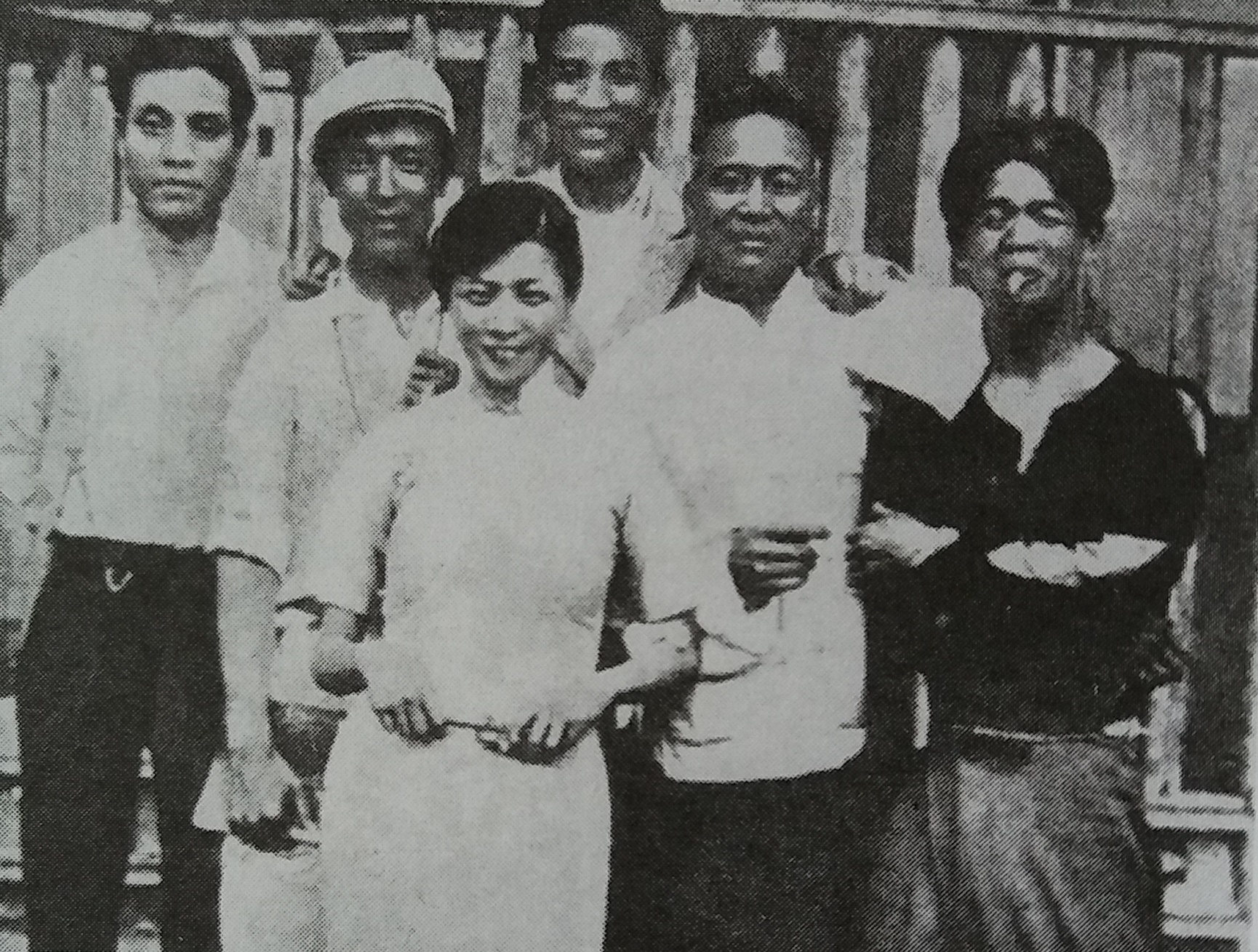
  Playthings crewmembers
- Yuan Congmei as Yuan Pu, an educated young man who befriends Sister Ye and later studies engineering abroad.
- Luo Peng as Ah Yong, a young villager who serves as the love interest of Pearly.
- Han Langen as Mantis, a toymaker and member of Sister Ye's community.
- Tang Tianxiu as Yu'er's adoptive mother, a wealthy Shanghai woman who raises Sister Ye's kidnapped son.
- Yin Xiucen in a supporting role as a civilian assisting local defenders during the Battle of Shanghai.

== Plot ==
The film opens on a rural Chinese village in the 1920s. Sister Ye (Ruan Lingyu) heads a workshop where she makes all kinds of toys in order to support her family, along with other families in her community. Sister Ye and her husband, Old Ye, have two children, a young daughter, Zhu'er, and a toddler son, Yu'er. A rich, handsome college student, Yuan Pu, tries to convince her to leave her husband for him, and although she likes him back, she instead convinces him to go study abroad. She urges him to study engineering so that Chinese industry may keep up with foreign mass-production, which is making artisan toymakers lose their livelihood due to them being unable to compete.

While peddling toys, Old Ye suddenly collapses and dies in Sister Ye's arms. Amid the ensuing confusion, Yu'er is kidnapped and sold to a wealthy family in Shanghai. Soon after, fighting between rival warlords engulfs the region, leading to the village getting razed and the surviving toymakers having to flee to the city. Determined to preserve their craft, Sister Ye organizes a street-corner collective that ekes out a living producing hand-made patriotic trinkets.

Ten years later, during 1931, Sister Ye and her fellow toymakers struggle to sell toys among mounting pressure from Japan on Shanghai. Around the same time, Yuan Pu has returned from abroad and set up the Great China Toy Factory. A year later, in 1932, the Japanese attack Shanghai again, and as the Chinese side starts to falter, instead of fleeing to safety, Zhu'er, now an accomplished toymaker herself, volunteers to supply toys and supplies to Nationalist soldiers. She is subsequently wounded in a Japanese bombing raid and dies in Sister Ye's arms, making her collapse in grief as a result.

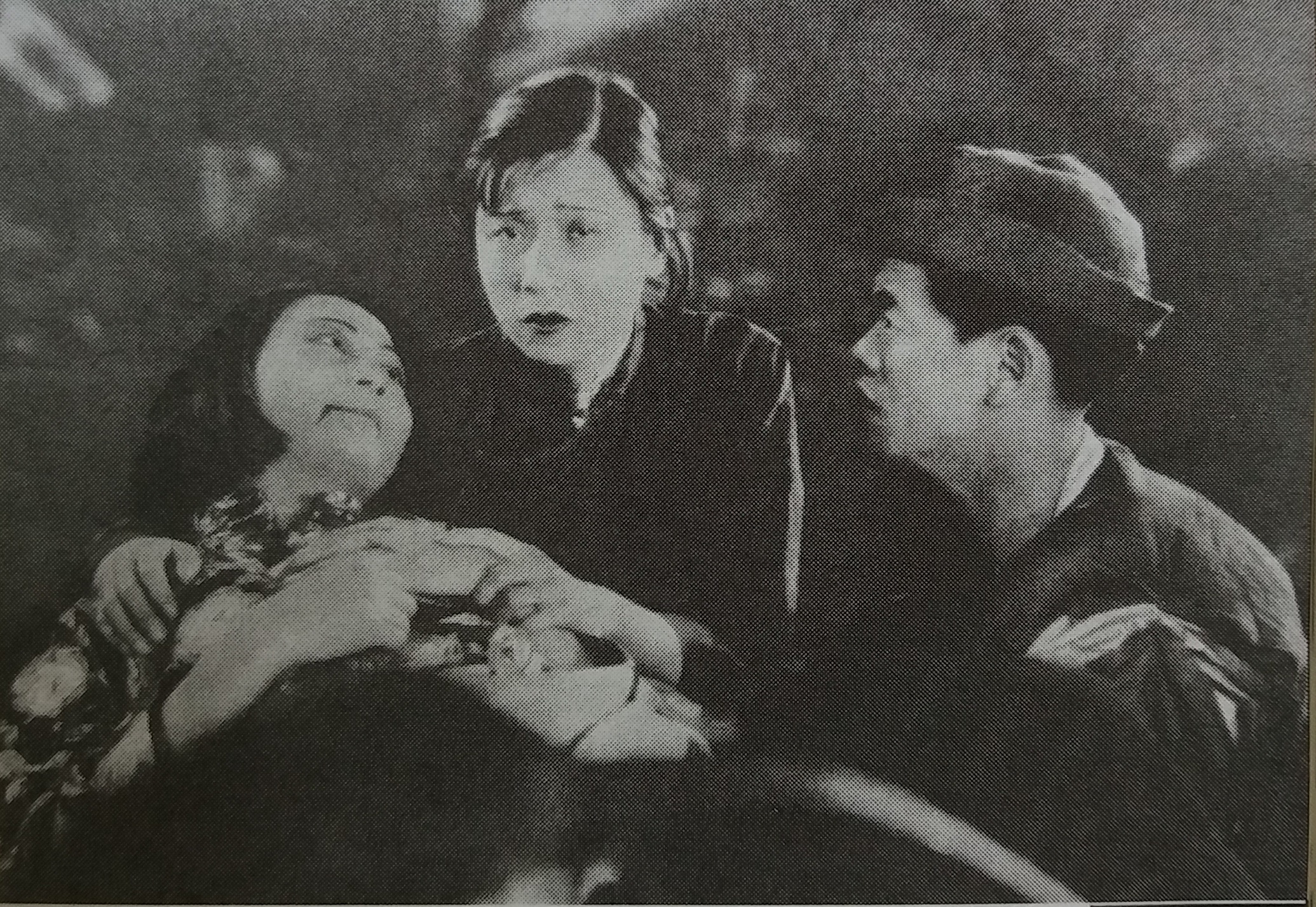
Screenshot from the film.

The following year, Chinese New Year's Eve, a destitute Sister Ye sits on the streets of Shanghai, selling her remaining toys. An older Yu'er, now a young boy, unaware that she's his real mother, buys a toy airplane and scissor-extension soldiers. Soon after, firecrackers erupt nearby and Sister Ye, mistaking them for bombs, runs into the street, warning onlookers that they're getting attacked again, leading to a frenzy. As she continues to scream, Yuan Pu spots her and tells a nearby policeman that she's with him. The crowd starts to look at her with contempt as they realize there's no immediate danger, but the aggression turns to approval as her impassioned cries calling for the unity of the country against foreign aggression strikes a chord with them.

== Production ==
Playthings was produced by Lianhua Film Company, and directed by filmmaker Sun Yu. Director Sun Yu was one of the studio’s most prominent filmmakers and is known for integrating nationalist concerns and social criticism into commercially successful productions. Production began in late spring 1933 and the film was later released on October 8, 1933 shortly before China’s National Day celebrations. The film was intended as a tribute to Chinese soldiers who had recently been fighting Japanese military aggression during the September 18 Incident of 1931 and the Shanghai Hai incident of 1932.

== Background ==
The film was made during a time of national exigency. Following the Mukden Incident on September 18, 1931, the Japanese army staged a bombing of a Manchurian railway and blamed it on Chinese troops to create a pretext for an invasion by military forces. This marked the beginning of the Japanese occupation of Northeast China and heightened tensions between the two countries. The condition deteriorated further in 1932 with the January 28 Incident, during which Japanese troops shelled Shanghai as a reprisal against growing anti-Japanese activism. Under such political conditions, ''Playthings'' was a novel filled with patriotic zeal and anti-imperialist indignation.

The movie also captures cultural concerns that originated from the New Culture Movement of the 1910s and 1920s, which reexamined conventional practices pertaining to education and childhood. At this time, toys became more regarded as a means of developing healthy, modern citizens. Foreignly produced or oddly shaped toys tended to be perceived as morally tainted or culturally foreign.

They filmed in late spring of 1933 and premiered the film on October 10th, the eve of China's National Day. The release date symbolically linked the film to national resistance and communal sacrifice, commemorating victims of recent wars.

== Themes ==
As a left-wing film from China's cinematic Golden Age, Little Toys prominently features nationalist and social themes, especially the conflict between traditional Chinese culture and incoming modernity. Sister Ye's handcrafted toys symbolize traditional creativity, innocence, and cultural purity, contrasting sharply with mass-produced foreign toys that embody industrialization and Western influence. This juxtaposition illustrates how imperialist economic pressures marginalize rural artisans, as affluent city consumers prefer imported goods, undermining the grassroots economy. Yet, the film avoids idealizing tradition uncritically, highlighting the inherent limitations of clinging solely to past practices.The male characters of the film "offer a view to the problematic nature of both China's 'traditional' past and the moral complexities of a more international and industrialized future society."

The handcrafted toys carry deep symbolic resonance. For Sister Ye, who has dedicated much of her life to their creation, the toys signify family sustenance, community livelihood, and pride in Chinese craftsmanship. According to Fernsebner, "despite its grim and desperate ending, 'Little Playthings' provided some essential tools for the job: a nostalgic sense of Chinese community and cultural identity located in this object, the toy, as well as an implicit, simultaneous critique of both the 'old society' and the Western forces (industrial and imperialist) which imperiled the Chinese nation." Despite the bleak conclusion, Little Toys provides audiences with nostalgia for communal and cultural coherence through these toys while simultaneously critiquing both China's "old society" and foreign industrial-imperialist forces that threaten national integrity. Additionally, Sister Ye's children embody the devastating human cost of social turmoil: her kidnapped son, symbolizing youth alienation due to upheaval and foreign influence, is disconnected emotionally from his mother. Their estrangement underscores the destructive impact of war and modernization on familial continuity. This recurring motif of lost or orphaned children was common in 1930s Chinese leftist cinema, reinforcing the film's critical examination of social conditions. Ultimately, Little Toys employs potent symbolism: traditional toys representing cultural memory and innocence, and the fragmented Ye family mirroring a nation disrupted by conflict.

== Contemporary reception ==
Produced during the Golden Age of Chinese cinema, among Sun Yu's other prominent works, Playthings has been regarded by contemporary critics and scholars as a classic film of notable cultural significance. Its focus on hardship, perseverance, patriotism, and resourcefulness portrayed by actress Ruan Lingyu helped progress the development of the "New Woman" archetype; a conceptualization that itself continued to gain prominence throughout 1930s-era Chinese discourse.

This film, among others produced by the Lianhua film company, is viewed by scholars as a significant component of the leftist film movement; notable for their focus on class struggle, nationalism, and the interplay between masculinity and femininity.

In 2005, the Hong Kong Film Awards ranked Playthings 70th overall on their list of best films within "the past 100 years of Chinese cinema." Chan's score combines both Western instruments, like the piano or cello, and traditional Chinese instruments, like the erhu and the gaohu. The 2007 production was staged in the Shanghai Concert Hall on November 2, 2007.

In 2012, Playthings was featured at the San Francisco Silent Film Festival, highlighting its enduring appeal and historical importance to international audiences.

== Music ==
Playthings is a silent film. In 2003, Singaporean composer Mark Chan, in a project co-commissioned by the Hong Kong Arts Festival and the Singapore Arts Festival, scored the silent film, and productions were staged in each country, featuring live music accompanying a screening of the film. The production was again re-staged in Copenhagen in 2005 and in the Shanghai International Arts Festival in 2007. News soundtracks created for silent films can play a key role in helping contemporary audiences understand social phenomena that are no longer common in today's society.

== English translations ==
The Chinese title Xiao Wanyi (小玩意) can be translated literally as "little playthings" or "small toys." The leading English title – Playthings – is a more ontologically inductive conceptualization of the word "play". This is reflective of the developmental role such devices serve in childhood upbringing and the formation of national identity. In contemporary analyses of the film, the toys themselves facilitate "a nostalgic sense of Chinese community" in addition to serving as the backdrop for the antagonistic relationship between "'old society' and Western forces."

The title Playthings also carries a metaphor symbolizing fragility, such as that of the workers who make them and the children who play it. Toys, as part of the economy, connect to the worker’s livelihoods; they are both tools for play and for work. The toy functions as a recurring motif throughout the film, symbolizing vulnerability, labor, childhood, economic relationships, and the Chinese nation itself.

An English-subtitled copy of the film uploaded by the Chinese Film Classics Project is available for public viewing on YouTube.
