= Liang Saizhen =

Chinese film actress and dancer

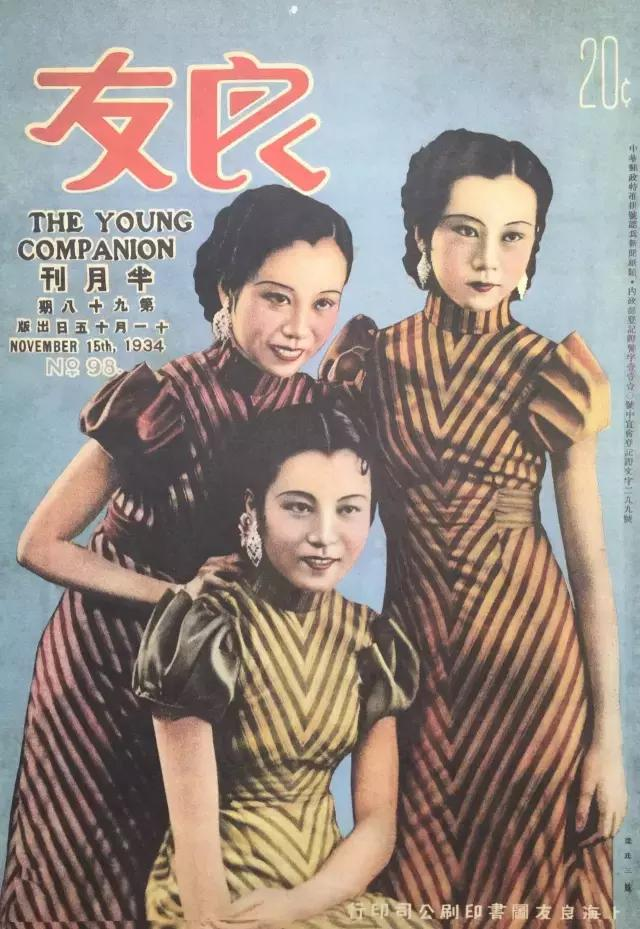
Liang Saizhen, Liang Saizhu, and Liang Saishan on the cover of The Young Companion, November 1934.

Liang Saizhen (梁賽珍), also romanised as Liang Sa-tsen, was a Chinese film actress and dancer active in the 1920s and 1930s. She appeared in over 20 films in Shanghai, the vast majority of them silent films. After the Second Sino-Japanese War began in 1937, she fled to British Malaya, and probably died in Singapore.

== Filmography ==
Year	English title	Original title	Role	Notes
1926	The Deadly Sins	孽海驚濤		Lost
1927	The Lustrous Pearl	夜明珠	Chang Aye Chien	
1927	Love Slave	情奴		Lost
1928	Spellbound	迷魂陣		Lost
1928	A Traveller's Tale	海外奇緣		Lost
1928	The Tiger and a Maid	猛虎劫美記		Lost
1928	The Flying Man	航空大俠		Lost
1929	The Seashore Hero	海濱豪俠		Lost
1929	Righteousness and Love	義海情天		Lost
1929	The Traitor	綠林叛徒		Lost
1929	The Romantic Heroine	浪漫女英雄		Lost
1930	The Burning of the Seven-Star Tower	火燒七星樓		Lost
1930	The Bitterness of a Marriage	百劫鴛鴦		Lost
1931	The Burning of the Red Lotus Temple	火燒紅蓮寺		Films 16–18 in series
1931	An Amorous History of the Silver Screen	銀幕艷史	Actress	
1931	Three Darts	三箭之愛		Lost
1931	Join the Army for My Wife	為妻從軍		Lost
1931	The Murderess	殺人的小姐		Lost
1931	Tough Youngsters	鐵血青年		Lost
1931	Who's the Hero?	誰是英雄		Lost
1931	In the Old Peking	舊時京華		Lost
1931	The Tai Chi Dart	太極鏢		Lost
1932	Revival of National Spirit	國魂的復活		Lost
1932	My Lovely Enemy	可愛的仇敵		Lost
1934	Madame Mai	麥夫人		Lost
1934	Give Back My Home	還我山河		Lost
1934	Rebirth	再生		Lost
1935	The Evil Beauty	蛇蠍美人		Lost
1935	Four Sisters	四姊妹		Lost

== Personal life ==
Her younger sisters Liang Saizhu (梁賽珠), Liang Saishan (梁賽珊), and Liang Saihu (梁賽瑚) also acted in some films. Liang Saizhu appeared in The Seashore Hero (1929), Madame Mai (1934), and Four Sisters (1935), as well as some films after 1935. Liang Saishan only appeared in Madame Mai and Four Sisters, and Liang Saihu only appeared in Four Sisters, which starred the four of them together.The Liang family four sisters raised money for the Anti-Japanese War and had initiated many fundraising activities.
