= Wang Zhengxin =

Chinese actor

- Traditional Chinese: 王徵信
- Simplified Chinese: 王征信
Transcriptions
Standard Mandarin
- Hanyu Pinyin: Wáng Zhēngxìn

Wang Zhengxin (1899–?), also romanised as Wang Tsen-sing, was a Chinese actor active from 1926 to 1937 in the cinema of Shanghai. He was either from Shandong or of Shandong descent.

His film career ended in 1937 when Japan bombed Shanghai at the start of the Second Sino-Japanese War. He fled to Sichuan or Chongqing, and later went to Kunming to become the deputy manager of Nanping Theatre (南屏大戲院). After the war ended in 1945, he returned to Shanghai and probably worked again in a theater or cinema. His life after that is unknown.

== Filmography ==
Year	English title	Original title	Role	Notes
1926	Debt Circles	連環債		
1926	Mother's Happiness	兒孫福	Eldest son-in-law	
1926	Reclaim Wasteland	殖邊外史	Army officer	
1926	Visiting the In-Laws	探親家	Zeng Boqing	
1927	Sex Trap	美人計		
1927	Four Heroes of the Wangs	王氏四俠		
1927	Redress a Grievance	烏盆記		
1927	The Miserable Life of Qiu Xiang	可憐的秋香		
1928	A Shanghai Dancing-Girl	上海一舞女		
1928	The King of Money	金錢之王		
1928	Shadows in the Old Palace	古宮魔影		
1928	Three and One	三雄奪美		
1928	Ma Zhenhua	馬振華		
1928	Who but Myself Can Do It?	銀槍盜		
1928	A Fabulous Swordsman	荒唐劍客		
1928	A Miner and the Boss' Sister	熱血鴛鴦		
1928	That Is Me	就是我		
1929	Two Swordsmen	兩劍客		
1929	Three Heroes of the Wangs	王氏三雄		
1929	Who Is the Thief?	誰是盜		
1930	The Burning of the Red Lotus Temple	火燒紅蓮寺		films 11–15 of the film series
1930	The Golden Road	黃金之路		
1930	Knight and Damsel	勇士救美記		
1931	Such Paradise	如此天堂前集	Dance hall manager	
1931	Sing-Song Girl Red Peony	歌女紅牡丹		
1931	A Shadow on the Window	窗上人影		
1931	Three Darts	三箭之愛		
1931	A Farewell to the Beauty	玉人永別		
1931	The Reunion	破鏡重圓		
1931	An Amorous History of the Silver Screen	銀幕艷史		
1931	Who Is a Hero	誰是英雄		
1932	Adventures in the Battlefield	戰地歷險記		
1932	My Lovely Enemy	可愛的仇敵		
1932	Disappointed Love	失戀		
1932	Blood Debt	血債		banned for anti-Japanese theme
1933	Spring Silkworms	春蠶	Li Gensheng	
1933	Salty Tide	鹽潮		
1933	Salt Lake	鹽湖		
1933	A Tragic Tale About My Sister	姊姊的悲劇		
1933	Love and Tears of Tenant	鐵板紅淚錄		
1933	The Lin Family's Shop	展覽會		
1933	A Beauty of Perfumed Grass	香草美人		
1934	The Classic for Girls	女兒經	Xu Li's boyfriend	
1934	Beauty's Heart	美人心		
1935	The Jade Horse	翡翠馬	Wang Tiemin	
1935	Ardent, Loyal Souls	熱血忠魂		
1935	National Soul	民族魂		
1936	The Diamond Case	金剛鑽		
1936	The Battle Between Peach and Plum	桃李爭艷		
1936	Rights for Women	女權		
1937	New Year's Coin	壓歲錢		
1937	In Full Vigor	生龍活虎		
1937	Strange Case in an Ancient Pagoda	古塔奇案		
1937	Night Run	夜奔		
