= Daybreak (1933 film) =

1933 Chinese film

- Film poster
- Traditional Chinese: 天明
- Simplified Chinese: 天明
- Hanyu Pinyin: Tiānmíng
- Directed by: Sun Yu
- Written by: Sun Yu
- Produced by: Lo Ming-yau
- Starring: Li Lili; Gao Zhanfei; Ye Juanjuan; Yuan Congmei; Luo Peng; Liu Chi-Chuen; Han Langen; Guilin Wang
- Cinematography: Zhou Ke
- Production company: Lianhua Film Company (Studio No.2)
- Distributed by: United States (DVD): Cinema Epoch
- Release date: 1933 (China)
- Running time: 116 minutes
- Country: China
- Languages: Silent film with Chinese intertitles

Daybreak (Chinese: 天明; pinyin: Tiānmíng) is a 1933 Chinese silent film, directed by Sun Yu. It was released by the Lianhua Film Company (United Photoplay Studio), premiered in Shanghai's Peking Theater on February 2, 1933. The film follows Lingling, a young country girl from a rural fishing village, as she moves to Shanghai with her cousin, Zhang. As Zhang drifts into revolutionary circles, Lingling falls into an unfortunate path. Sold to a corrupt boss who intoxicates and rapes her by her own sister, Lingling is forced into prostitution before eventually becoming a martyr for the oncoming revolution.

Daybreak is supervised by Lo Ming Yau, with Lu Hanzhang as production director, Zhou Ke as cinematographer, and Fang Peilin as set designer.

The film stars Li Lili, one of the biggest silent film stars of the period. It was a star vehicle for Li Lili in the early stages of her career, and the seventh film of director Sun Yu, who was the best-known auteur of Shanghai cinema during the 1920s. She had also portrayed a similar role involving seduction for espionage in Sun Yu's The Great Road (1934).

The film was also created in commemoration and celebration of the Kuomintang Party's successful completion in the Northern Expedition. Director Sun Yu's films were intended for nationalist propaganda and Daybreak presents a narrative of redemption as a soft film - the concept where cinema is created as a form of entertainment and a means of aesthetic presentation above all else. The narrative openness encourages and allows for cinematic audiences to develop their own political interpretations and, in this film, for "left wing" or "pro-CCP" messages to emerge from its mise en abyme, apart from the apparent "pro-KMT" message.

== Plot ==
=== Arrival at Shanghai ===
Lingling originates from a rural fishing village, the heavy taxes and levies prompt her to move to the bustling city of Shanghai in search of a better life alongside his cousin, Zhang. After settling in Shanghai with her, Lingling and her cousin eventually secures a job working at a silk factory.

=== Betrayal and Descent ===
One day, Lingling has been swapped forcibly to night shifts. Cousin Zhang tries to stand up but is fired from the job. The two separates as Cousin Zhang lands a job at a seafaring ship.

A few days later, under the pressure of the silk factory manager, Lingling's older cousin betrays Lingling by allowing the manager to intoxicate and rape Lingling under the guise of a business meeting. Afterwards, Lingling returns to her home but soon attacked by an undisclosed man. Fat-brother-in-law comes to rescue but is pushed aside by Lingling.

Lingling, under a trance and her reminiscence of her hometown, walks down the sketchy part of Shanghai. An old man exploits her vulnerability and sells her to a brothel.

A year later, Lingling escapes the clutches of the pimp under the chaos caused by a revolutionary chant. She returns home and finds the older cousin dying from what implied to be tuberculosis. Upon the older cousin's death, Lingling makes up the resolve to help the revolution as sex worker.

=== Espionage as a Sex Worker ===
Lingling becomes a high-class sex worker. Leveraging Her role, Lingling accumulates wealth and distributes it to help former factory friends and the less fortunate.

Zhang returns as an undercover revolutionary and Lingling helps him by providing him cover as a client to turn the warlord's investigators away. As a result, Lingling is sentenced to death for collusion with the revolutionaries. An young officer becomes empathetic of Lingling's actions but is ordered to supervise the execution.

=== Martyrdom and Redemption ===
the execution supervisor attempts explain that executing Lingling would only make her a martyr, and does not address the underlying social issue, but to no avail. Lingling requests the firing squad to shoot only when she is smiling her best.

Lingling's request and her past actions inspire the execution supervisor, who then turns and encourages the firing squad to turn their guns towards the oppressive warlord instead, but he fails and is shot by his superior. Lingling is executed next to young officer.

== Cast ==
- Li Lili as Lingling, the film's heroine. An innocent, pure, and hopeful young girl from a rural fishing village who experiences the darker side of Shanghai.
- Gao Zhanfei as Cousin Zhang. Fullname Zhang Jin. Lingling's cousin who becomes involved in revolutionary activities.
- Ye Juanjuan as Lingling's older cousin, lover of Fat Brother-in-laws, who eventually betrays Lingling under the pressure of Silk Factory Manager.
- Yuan Congmei as Silk Factory Manager, a warlord's son who is portrayed to be decadent and womanizing.
- Luo Peng as Young Officer, a regiment commander whose last name is Luo, and has an empathetic personality.
- Han Langen as Skinny Monkey, a supporting character who is a member of the revolutionary group Cousin Zhang is in.
  - He is also a comedic relief, both before and after his association with the revolutionary group.
- Liu Chi-Chuen as Fat Brother-in-Law: Lover of Lingling's older cousin.
  - He offered some comedic relief as by imitating a pig in some scenes of the film.
- Wang Guilin as Garrison Commander, the one who orders Lingling's execution.

== Critical analysis ==
=== Thematic Analysis ===
Some claimed that this film has an anti-capitalistic and anti-modern message. This is shown using:

- Lingling as a "homo sacer" (an individual who can be killed without legal consequence) whose sacrificial death is meant to awaken the masses and redeem the nation.
- The juxtaposition of "country girl"(which is used as a symbol of "purity") and "modern girl"(which is used as a symbol of "corruption"), shown via the transformation of Lingling.
- Some claimed that Sun Yu links the female body with patriotic sacrifice and revolutionary ideals as an attempt to transcend voyeuristic representations. Lingling's transformation and her leveraging her position to help others reflect Sun Yu's efforts to reframe the female body and agency within the revolutionary narrative.
  - Some argued that the female body attraction was simply to attract young audiences, in order to avoid the lukewarm reception that Spring Silkworm (1933), a similarly "progressive" film, had. (Note: Yuan Qingfeng claimed that body attraction was used by Sun Yu to attract audiences to avoid Daybreak having lukewarm reception like Spring Silkworm (1933) did. Spring Silkworms (1933) did have a lukewarm reception according to Yuan's cited source, but the source cited that the lukewarm reception as a result of lack of narrative conflict and not lack of body attraction.)

An alternate thematic message of the film could be one which questions the necessity of dehumanization of an individual to a homo sacer and the transformation of them towards martyrdom.

==== Political Alignment ====
Most agreed that films of Lianhua Film Company's Studio No.2, and those of Sun Yu's (Daybreak included), are left-wing films. (Note: Yuan Qingfeng defined "left-wing" films as "All radical, unconventional, liberating, or revolutionary work that subverts and defies existing social norms.")

Some argued that Daybreak should be understood as a politically ambiguous “soft film” rather than as either purely apolitical entertainment or straightforward left-wing cinema. (Note: Victor Fan argued that the political alignment of this film is apparently Pro-KMT, as KMT and CCP ideals were similar at the time; and only by interpreting the narrative inconsistencies in the portrayal of "country life" and the potential generational continuation of the "modern girl", one can see notions of class struggle, which could be interpreted as a more CCP-aligned message.)

=== Cinematic Devices ===
Some pointed out that many cinematic devices are used to promote the anti-capitalistic and anti-modern message in this film:

- Symbolic lighting is used to visually represent the transformation of Lingling.
- Low-key lighting with heavy shadow contrasts in her Shanghai rooftop apartment creates a suspenseful atmosphere, especially when contrasted with the natural lighting used and seen in the countryside flashbacks, where reflector boards were used to create a soft light that illuminates the waters and Lili's face.
- The film contrasts Shanghai nightlife and bourgeois pleasure with factory labor and poor living conditions, by using faster cutting of city scenes and increased use of short shots help represent the psychological pressure of rural migrants entering the city.

=== Historical Context ===
From a historical standpoint, some pointed out that Daybreak is among the many Chinese left-wing films of the 1930s have focused around the thematic concept of "women's liberation".

=== Reception ===
- Some had criticized Daybreak for the rather naive and idealistic second half, for the philanthropic behaviour of Lingling; and Lingling's request to die when she is smiling the best made some feel Lingling wants to die. Li Suyuan attributed this to Sun Yu's failure at "addressing the hollowness of the film content."
  - Yuan Qingfeng argued that supposed absurdity was intended to leave a strong impression to the audience.
- The public reception of Daybreak is unknown with the current sources at hand. (Note: It could be inferred that the Daybreak performed better than Spring Silkworms (1933) given Yuan Qingfeng's argument, but there is no concrete evidence.)

== Home media ==
Daybreak was released on region free DVD by Cinema Epoch on May 8, 2007. The disc features English subtitles and includes Crossroads, a 1937 film directed by Shen Xiling and released by the Mingxing Film Company.

A free version of the film with English subtitles can also be found on the University of British Columbia’s Chinese Film Classics website, as well as on YouTube under the same name.

== Trivia ==
1. Some speculated that the ending scene where Lingling walked towards the executioners, was inspired by Marie (portrayed by Marlene Dietrich) in Dishonored (1931).
2. Some identified Li Lili as one of the major actresses associated with the Lianhua Film Company. She notes that Li entered Lianhua through its dance troupe, appeared in thirteen films for the company, and that her breakthrough as an actress came with Daybreak. Through Daybreak. Li Lili made the impression to some as the "Queen of masquerade" by her showcasing her transformation in character via costume, make-up and hairstyle.

== Bibliography ==
- Fan, Victor (2014). "The Cinema of Sun Yu: Ice cream for the eye... but with a homo sacer". Journal of Chinese Cinemas. 5 (3): 219–251. doi:10.1386/jcc.5.3.219_1. S2CID 154855940.
- Hansen, Miriam Bratu (2000). "Fallen Women, Rising Stars, New Horizons: Shanghai Silent Film As Vernacular Modernism". Film Quarterly. 54 (1): 10–22. doi:10.2307/1213797. JSTOR 1213797.
- Zhang, Zhen. An Amorous History of the Silver Screen: Shanghai Cinema, 1896–1937. Chicago: University of Chicago Press.
- Fan, Victor. (2014). Taylor & Francis. https://www.tandfonline.com/doi/abs/10.1386/jcc.5.3.219_1
