= Xu Lai (actress) =

Chinese actress and secret agent (1909–1973)

- 徐来
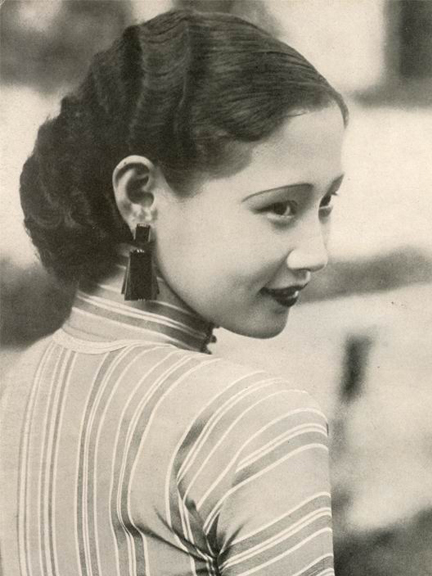
- Xu in 1940
- Born: Xu Xiaomei; 1909; Shanghai, Qing China
- Died: 4 April 1973 (aged 64); Beijing, China
- Occupations: Actress, secret agent
- Notable work: Remnants of Spring; The Boatman's Daughter
- Spouses: Li Jinhui (m. 1930; div. 1935) Tang Shengming (m. 1936–1973)
- Children: 1

Xu Lai (Chinese: 徐来; Wade–Giles: Hsü Lai; 1909 – 4 April 1973) was a Chinese film actress, socialite, and World War II secret agent. Known as the "Standard Beauty", she was active in the film industry for only three years, and quit acting after the suicide of the great star Ruan Lingyu in 1935. Her first husband was Li Jinhui, the "Father of Chinese pop music".

During the Second Sino-Japanese War, Xu and her second husband, Lieutenant General Tang Shengming, ostensibly served under the Japanese-controlled Nanking puppet regime, but secretly worked as agents for the Republic of China resistance based in Chongqing.

With the Communist victory in the Chinese Civil War, Xu and Tang defected to the People's Republic of China. They were severely persecuted during the Cultural Revolution (1966–1976). Xu died in prison in 1973; her husband survived and lived until 1987.

== Early life ==
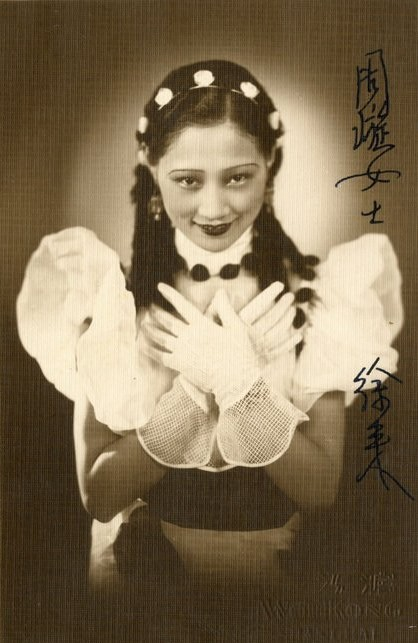
Xu Lai's autographed photo for Zhou Xuan, a younger star of the Bright Moon Troupe

Xu Lai was born in 1909 to a poor family in Shanghai. Her original name was Xu Xiaomei (徐小妹) and she was also called Xu Jiefeng (徐洁凤). Due to poverty, she began working at a British-owned egg factory in Zhabei at the age of 13, but was later able to attend school after her family fortunes improved.

In 1927, Xu attended the China Song and Dance School run by Li Jinhui, who is now considered the "Father of Chinese pop music". She also joined Li's Bright Moon Song and Dance Troupe and toured many cities in China and Southeast Asia. She married Li, who was 18 years her senior, in 1930, and gave birth to a daughter named Xiaofeng.

== Film career and other activities ==
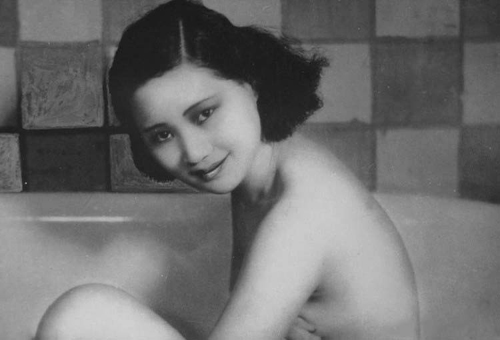
Xu Lai in Remnants of Spring (1933), probably the earliest female bath scene in the history of Chinese cinema

In 1932, Xu Lai was recruited by Zhou Jianyun, a cofounder of the Mingxing Film Company, to join the studio. She became famous after starring in the 1933 silent film Remnants of Spring (残春), in which she appeared in probably the earliest female bath scene in the history of Chinese cinema. Later that year she starred in A Feather on Mount Tai (泰山鸿毛). In 1934, she starred in Cheng Bugao's popular patriotic films Romance of Mount Hua (华山艳史) and Go Northwest (到西北去).

Xu Lai, together with Wang Renmei and Li Lili, her former colleagues at the Bright Moon Troupe, were the earliest stars to portray the vibrant, wholesome, and sexy "country girl" prototype, which became one of the most popular figures in Chinese cinema, and later inherited by the cinema of Hong Kong.

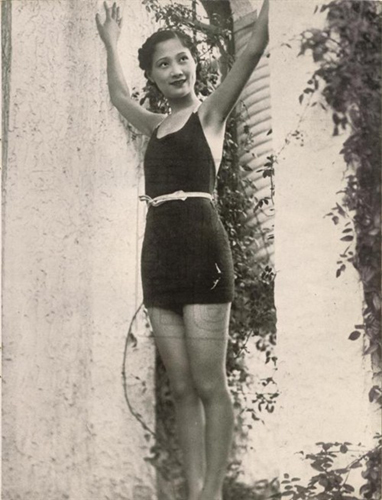
Xu Lai

Xu became widely known as the "Standard Beauty", and a ceremony was held to crown her the "Beauty Queen of the Far East". The Shanghai Chinese Women's Association strongly disapproved of her "coronation". Among the objections raised was that she "shocked the public by exhibiting herself in the nude", referring to her bath scene.

The suicide of actress Ruan Lingyu in 1935, which caused three other women to commit suicide during her 3 miles (4.8 km) long funeral procession, had a major impact on Xu Lai. She quit acting after finishing her last film, The Boatman's Daughter (船家女), directed by Shen Xiling. It was critically acclaimed and considered her best film.

The sudden death of her daughter Xiaofeng, also in 1935, caused a breakdown of her marriage with Li Jinhui, and the couple divorced in November of that year. It was an acrimonious divorce and Li requested compensation for the investment he had made in training her.

== Secret agent ==
In 1936, Xu Lai married Tang Shengming (唐生明), a Kuomintang Lieutenant General from a prominent Hunanese family. Tang was a notorious playboy and a close friend of Dai Li, chief of the Bureau of Investigation and Statistics (Juntong), the secret service of the Republic of China. Xu's assistant Zhang Suzhen (张素贞), a Juntong secret agent, became Tang's concubine, and Shanghai tabloids often reported salacious stories of the three sharing the same bed. Tang made sure that Xu Lai introduced Dai Li to the "movie queen" Hu Die, who later became the spy chief's mistress.

A year after her wedding, the Second Sino-Japanese War erupted. The Imperial Japanese Army attacked Shanghai in August 1937, and the national capital Nanking in December. Tang's older brother, General Tang Shengzhi, was the chief commander of the doomed defense of Nanking, which resulted in the Nanking Massacre. Tang Shengming, meanwhile, was the deputy commander of Changsha and chief commander of Changde, both in Hunan province.

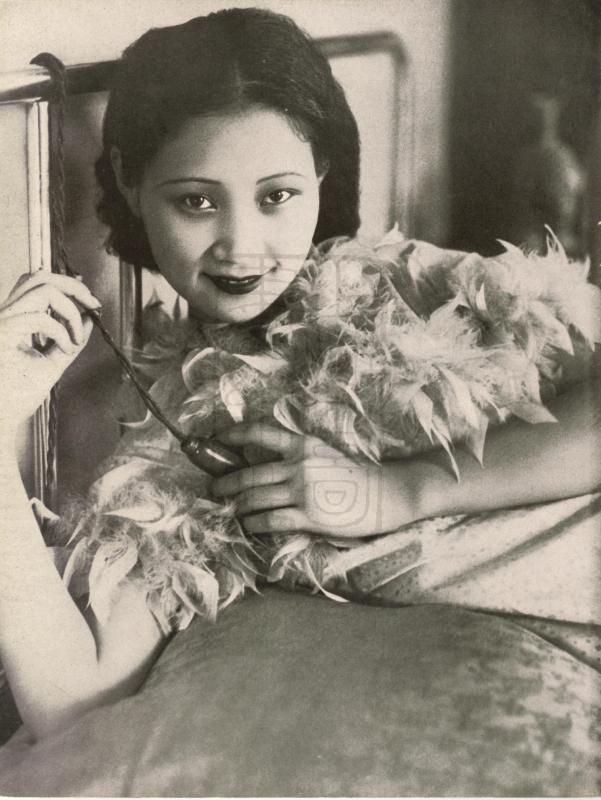
Xu Lai

In 1940, Tang Shengming surrendered to the Japanese and was recruited to serve in the Reorganized National Government of China (the Wang Jingwei regime), a puppet government established by Japan in occupied Nanking. Tang was appointed the commander of public security of Jiangsu province, while Xu was his socialite wife who became a close friend with the wives of Wang Jingwei, Chen Gongbo, and Zhou Fohai, the top leaders of the puppet regime. They were widely condemned by the Chinese public as traitors, and Tang Shengzhi publicly renounced all relationship with his brother and sister-in-law.

After the surrender of Japan at the end of World War II, the Kuomintang government revealed that Tang Shengming and Xu Lai had been sent by Dai Li to serve as secret agents in the Wang Jingwei regime. The couple took great personal risks to obtain intelligence about Japanese spies and troop movements and pass it to the resistance. Xu Lai reportedly discovered the identity of a Japanese spy while playing mahjong with Zhou Fohai's wife, and personally delivered messages to Chinese agents in Shanghai in urgent situations.

== After 1949 and death ==
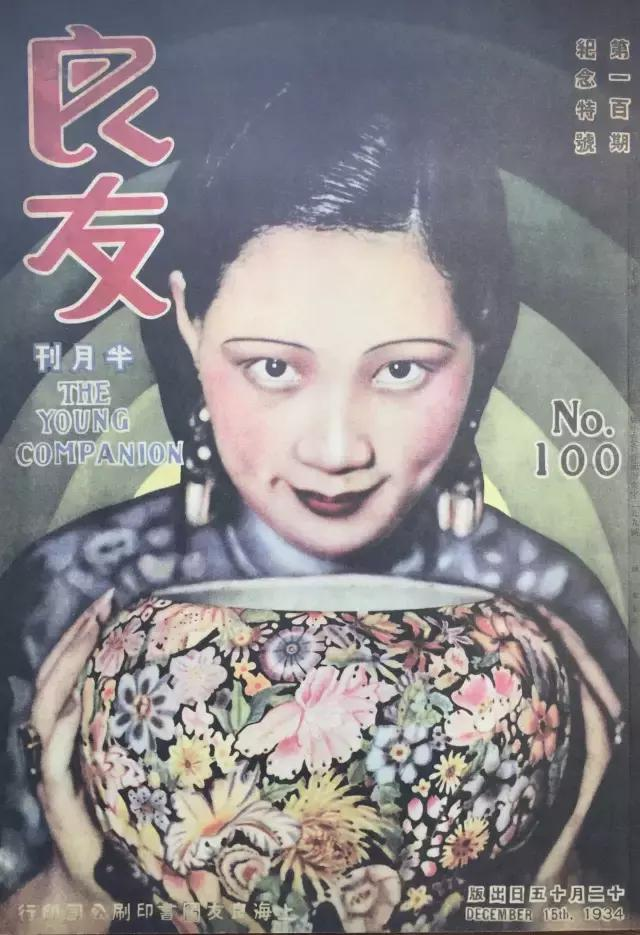
Xu Lai on the cover of The Young Companion, a Shanghai pictorial.

In 1949, as it was becoming clear that Mao Zedong's Communists were winning the Chinese Civil War, Xu Lai moved her family from Shanghai to British Hong Kong, while Tang Shengming went to Changsha to join the surrender of Hunan Governor Cheng Qian to the Communists. His brother Tang Shengzhi also surrendered. In 1950, Tang Shengming was appointed deputy commander of 21st Group Army of the People's Liberation Army and fought battles against the Kuomintang troops in Guangdong and Guangxi provinces.

In 1956, Tang was appointed a counselor of the State Council of the People's Republic of China, and Xu Lai moved with her husband to Beijing.

When the Cultural Revolution started in 1966, Mao's wife Jiang Qing, who had been a minor actress in Shanghai during the 1930s, began persecuting many of her former colleagues who were familiar with her "bourgeois" past. Xu Lai and her husband were both imprisoned for unfounded criminal charges. On 4 April 1973, Xu died in prison after years of torture and maltreatment, at the age of 64. Tang survived the tumultuous period, and lived until 1987.

== See also ==
- Shangguan Yunzhu
- Sun Weishi
- Wang Ying (actress)
