= Xuan Jinglin =

Chinese actress (1907–1992)

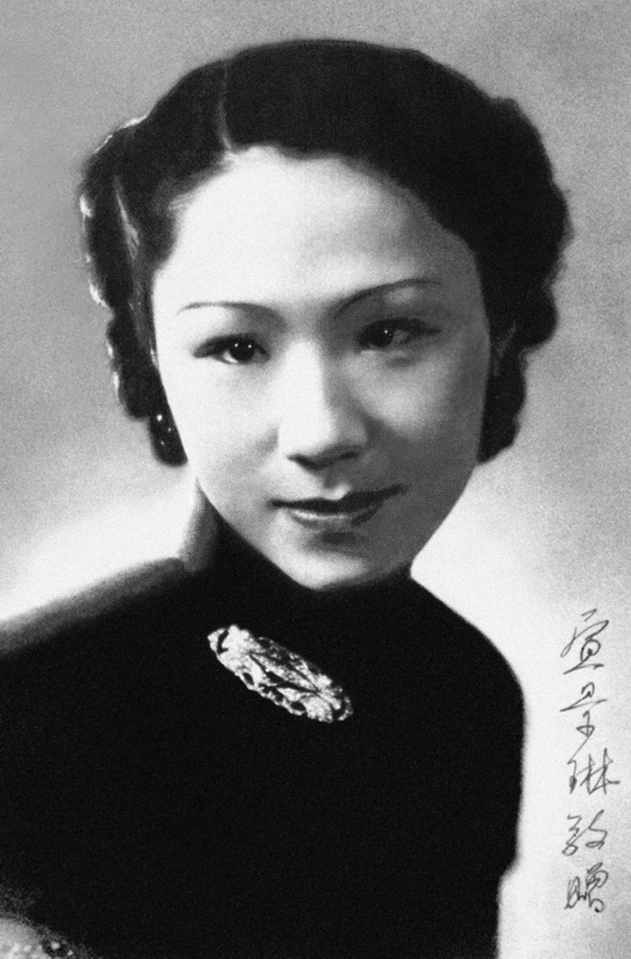
- Xuan in 1935
- Born: Tian Jinlin; 1907; Shanghai
- Died: January 22, 1992 (aged 84–85); Shanghai
- Known for: Acting

Xuan Jinglin (Chinese: 宣景琳; Wade–Giles: Hsüan Ching-lin; 1907 – January 22, 1992), also romanised as Sie King-ling, was a Republican-era Chinese actress. She was bought out of a brothel and became a successful actress for the Mingxing film company.

== Early life ==
Xuan was born in Shanghai in 1907 under the name Tian Jinlin. She was brought up in a family that was so poor that her mother sold her to a brothel in order that her elder siblings might eat. She had little education and was described as barely literate.

== Career ==
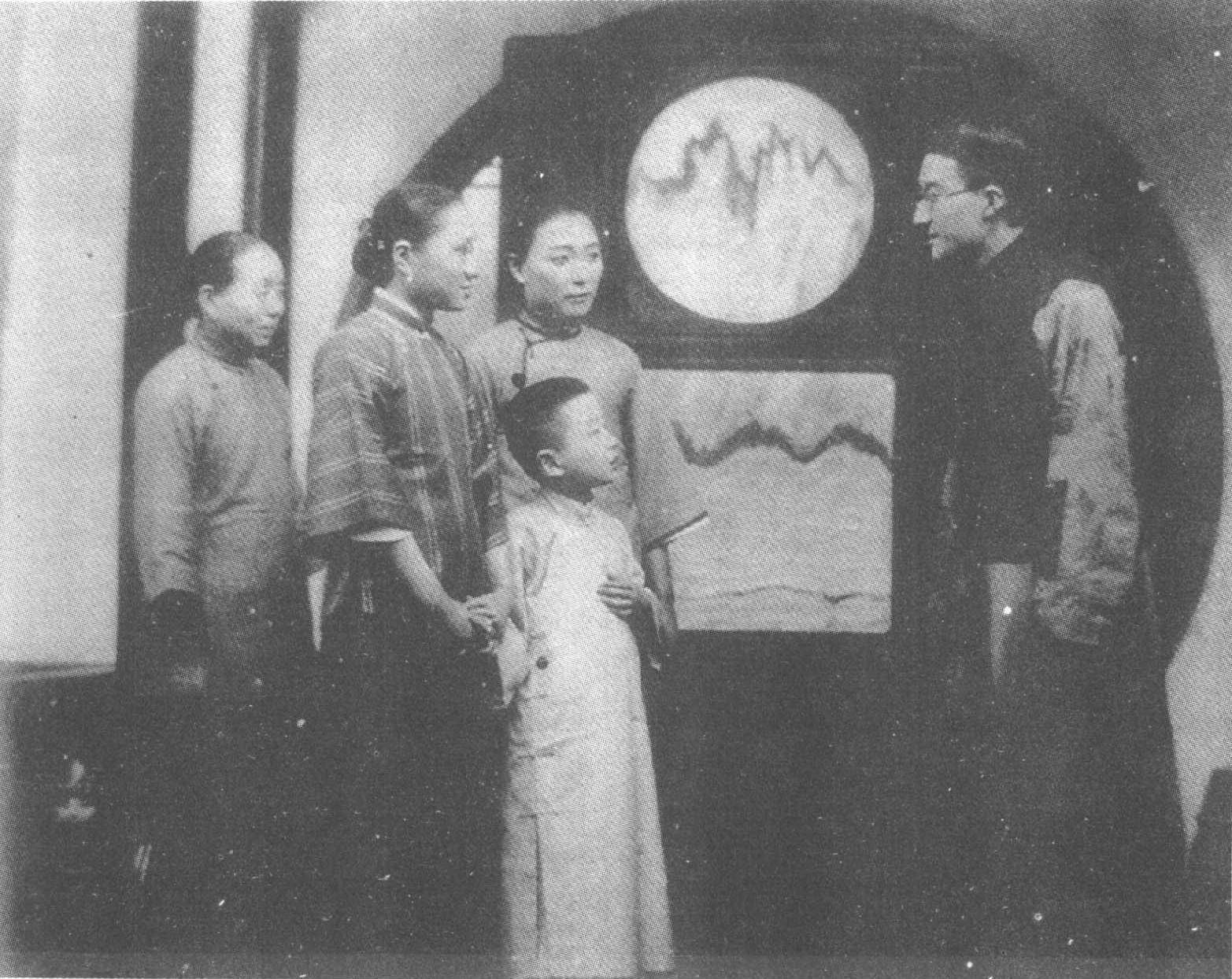
In the 1935 film "Little Friend", Madame Shen (Xuan Jinglin, second left) introduces her brother-in-law to a bright young boy (Zhang Xiaoqiu) she has brought home as a substitute for her lost son.

She was discovered by Zhang Shichuan. He had seen her as a child in an amusement park where he was the manager. He later re-found her and offered her a small part in a now lost film. He liked her acting and bought her out of the brothel so that she could act in films by the Mingxing Film Company. This was then a small company that he was a director of, and from May 1925 she had parts in Mingxing films as both her, and the company's, fortunes improved.

Her stage name was devised by Zheng Zhengqiu who based it on the name she had adopted in the brothel and a transliteration of Lillian Gish into Shanghainese.

Her second film, A Woman in Shanghai, was devised for her and echoed her own Cinderella story. She played a prostitute who is rescued by a millionaire. She was not typecast, and she played a female gangster, an innocent country girl, a dancer and a poor widow in 1920s Mingxing films.

In 1930 Mingxing Films invested its profits from the epic (27 hour) martial arts films The Burning of the Red Lotus Temple in a new studio. This new technology is featured in their 1930/1931 film An Amorous History of the Silver Screen which features Xuan. The film has been described as "self-referential docudrama" as it tells the story of a prostitute who becomes an actress. The film is also seen as showing a new relationship with technological advancements in film making. Xuan plays again a prostitute in a film with the film and she strikes back at her attacker. This act within the film is seen, by Zhang Zhen, as emblematic of a change in the film's story and the actress's life.

In 1931 she made her first film outside Mingxing films. She appeared in Tianyi Film Company's film "Pleasures of the Dance Hall" which was very popular. The backstage plot featured sound from a disc and was a musical with drama interspersed with songs.

== Second Sino-Japanese War ==
Filming stopped when fighting between the Japanese and Chinese broke out in Shanghai on January 28, 1932. Xuan would later formed the Xuan Jinglin Road Company and toured China giving musical performances.

Xuan died in Shanghai in 1992. Because of her important role in early Chinese cinema she has been included with Yang Naimei, Wang Hanlun and Zhang Zhiyun as one of China's "Four Famous Actresses".

== Films ==
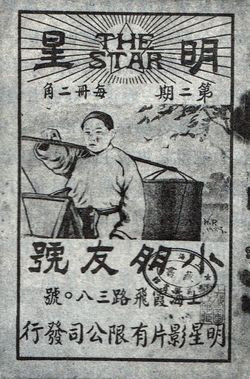
Mingxing mag June 1925 featuring her film "Little Friend"

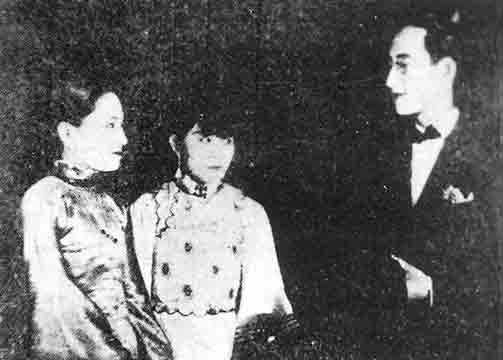
The Rich Man's Daughter 1926: Xuan Jinglin, Fu Lühen and Wang Xianzhai

- The Last Conscience (1925)
- Little Friend (1925)
- A Pitiful Girl (1925)
- He Wants a Baby (1926)
- Nameless Hero (1926)
- A Good Man (1926)
- The Rich Man's Daughter (1926)
- A Lovelorn Actress (1926)
- Suspicious Couple (1926)
- Real and False Daughters (1927)
- Fallen Plum Blossoms (1927)
- The Young Mistress's Fan (1928)
- A Dissolute Woman (1930)
- Virtuous Mother From a Brothel (1930)
- Last Love (1931)
- Shanghai Woman (1931)
- Farewell to Yuren (1931)
- A Couple in Life and Death (1931)
- Pleasures of the Dance Hall (1931)
- Shadow on the Window (1931)
- A Married Woman (1932)
- Twin Sisters (1933 or 1934)
- Two Against One (1933)
- The Future (1933)
- Mother and Son (1933)
- Homesick (1934)
- A Brief Life (1934)
- The Doctrine of Women (1934)
- Sisters Reborn (1934)
- A Big Family (1935)
- Tears of Blood in the Dance Hall (1936)
- Family (1956)
- Beside the Sanba River (1958)
- Fragrance in the Air (1959)
- The Underground War (1959)
- Family Problems (1964)
