= Wu Lizhu =

Chinese chemist

- 吴骊珠
- Born: 1968 (age 57–58); Qinzhou District, Tianshui, Gansu, China
- Education: Lanzhou University; University of Hong Kong
- Scientific career
- Fields: Organic chemistry
- Workplaces: Technical Institute of Physics and Chemistry, Chinese Academy of Sciences (CAS)

Chinese name
- Traditional Chinese: 吳驪珠
- Simplified Chinese: 吴骊珠
Transcriptions
Standard Mandarin
- Hanyu Pinyin: Wú Lízhū

Wu Lizhu (Chinese: 吴骊珠; born 1968) is a Chinese chemist specializing in organic chemistry.

== Early life ==
Wu was born in 1968 in Qinzhou District of Tianshui, Gansu into a Hui family. Her father Wu Jiantao (吴剑涛) and mother Ma Xian'e (马先娥) were a professors at Northwest University for Nationalities. Her grandfather Wu Hongjian (吴鸿健) was a member of the China Democratic League and vice chairman of the Tianshui Committee of the Chinese People's Political Consultative Conference. Her great-uncle Wu Hongbin (吴鸿宾) was mayor of Tianshui, vice chairman of the Standing Committee of Gansu Provincial People's Congress and executive vice chairman of Gansu Provincial Committee of the Chinese People's Political Consultative Conference.

== Education ==
She received her Bachelor of Science degree in 1990 at Lanzhou University and completed his doctoral work in 1995 at the Institute of Chemistry, Chinese Academy of Sciences under the supervision of Tong Zhenhe. After graduation, she worked there, becoming associate research fellow in 1996 and research fellow in 1998. From 1997 to 1998 she was a postdoc at the University of Hong Kong under the supervision of Chi-Ming Che.

== Career ==
She is now a researcher and doctoral supervisor at the Technical Institute of Physics and Chemistry, Chinese Academy of Sciences (CAS).

== Honours and awards ==
- 2001 Distinguished Young Scholar by the National Science Fund
- 2010 The 7th China Young Female Scientist Award
- 2011 Li Yuehua Outstanding Instructor Award
- November 22, 2019 Member of the Chinese Academy of Sciences (CAS)
