= Pink Dream =

1932 film

- Promotional film poster
- Traditional Chinese: 粉紅色的夢
- Simplified Chinese: 粉红色的梦
- Hanyu Pinyin: Fěn hóng sè de mèng
- Directed by: Cai Chusheng
- Written by: Cai Chusheng
- Starring: Gao Zhanfei; Zheng Junli
- Cinematography: Zhou Ke
- Production company: Lianhua Film Company
- Release date: 1932
- Running time: 83 minutes
- Country: China
- Language: Silent with Chinese intertitles

A Dream in Pink (Chinese: 粉红色的梦/粉紅色的夢; pinyin: Fěn hóng sè de mèng), also known as Pink Dream or A Rosy Dream, is a 1932 Chinese silent film and an early film by director Cai Chusheng. A melodrama, the film's pointed critique of the decadent urban lifestyle was nevertheless met with criticism by Shanghai's progressives, who regarded the film itself as decadent and excessively influenced by American cinema, particularly the film's numerous scenes of Shanghai's dance halls. Today the film is generally regarded as Cai's last film before his turn towards more overtly leftist films.

It is sometimes translated as A Dream in Pink. An extant print of the film is maintained by the China Film Archives. An English translation of the film, from the Chinese Film Classics Project, is available on YouTube.

== Plot ==
A Dream in Pink tells the story of a young novelist who is supported by a loving and hard-working wife. The novelist, however, is drawn to the decadent life of a socialite who introduces him to the dance halls that dot Shanghai. As the film progresses, the novelist soon learns of the emptiness of this urban existence and rejects it as a "pink dream." He takes up with a socialite, who ends up draining his finances and being a bad step-mother to his daughter. The cast-off wife, who moves to the countryside, hears of his financial distress and pens a gut-wrenching novel, which she submits to a publisher under his name. When the novelist, after receiving a windfall, learns of the truth, he seeks out and is reconciled with his wife, and their daughter sings a song to celebrate the reunion.
