= Yin Xiucen =

Chinese actor, singer, director and comedian

- 殷秀岑
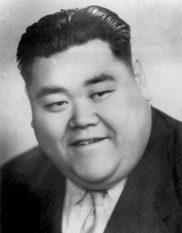
- Yin in 1928
- Born: June 12, 1911; Tianjin, Republic of China
- Died: March 3, 1979 (aged 67); Shanghai
- Other name: S.C Ying
- Occupations: Actor, Comedian
- Years active: 1931-1957
- Employer: Lianhua Film Productions
- Known for: The Chinese "Haurel and Lardy" along with Han Langen
- Political party: Chinese Communist Party (1977-1979)
- Spouse: Severance Yin
- Children: Jonathan Yin (Biologist)

Yin Xiucen (殷秀岑), also known as S.C. Ying (June 12, 1911 - March 3, 1979) was a Chinese actor, singer, film director and comedian. During his twenty-five year film career, he became particularly known for his comic roles with Han Langen.

== Biography ==
Yin Xiucen was born in Tianjin to a family of restaurateurs. He studied at Tientsin No. 7 High School.

It was at Lianhua, where Yin was first cast in a comedy role for the 1931 movie "New Resentment in the Forbidden City" (故宫新怨), which was also the screen debut for famous Chinese actress Bai Yang (白杨). The hilarious performance of the portly actor, who reportedly weighted up to 300 kg, caught the attention of both the audience and production professionals. Shortly after, he was transferred to Lianhua's Shanghai studio where he would soon meet his long-time comedic collaborator.

The two would gain a reputation as China's "Laurel and Hardy" He appeared in mostly comedic films such as Queen of Sports, Kuanghuan Zhi Ye, Lang Shan de Xue Ji, and more such as his famous comedic role in the wartime movie Mulan Joins the Army and Princess Iron Fan, which was China's first animated movie. 1935 was the start of the Han Langen/Yin Xuecen duo. The two also starred in the 1957 satirical comedy The Unfinished Comedy.

Yin was arrested in 1973 but was one of the first people freed after Mao's death in 1976, as part of the Boluan Fanzheng period. Yin Xiucen died in Shanghai, on March 3, 1979. Reportedly, over 1100 people showed up to the funeral procession.
