= Hu Ping (actress) =

Chinese actress, screenwriter and filmmaker

- 胡萍
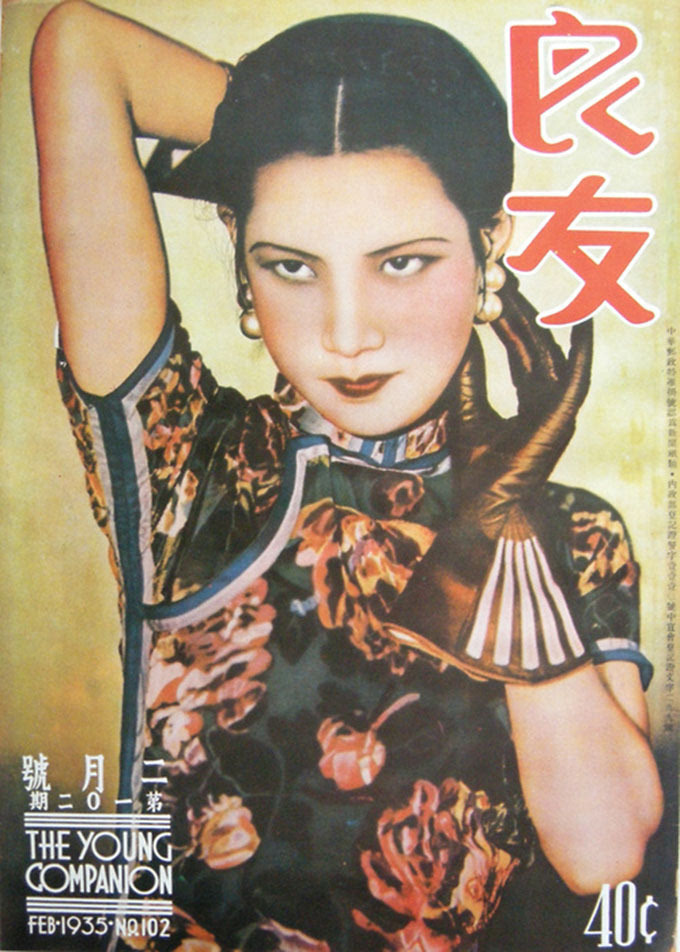
- Hu Ping on the cover of The Young Companion or Liangyou magazine, February 1935
- Born: 1910 (age 115–116); Changsha, China
- Occupation: actress

Hu Ping (胡萍) (1910–?) was a Chinese actress, screenwriter and filmmaker from Hunan, China, born in Changsha. She started acting in Shanghai, in the theater industry and was a household name in Shanghai in the 1930s. She joined the Friends Film Company in 1931. Her movies included Love and Life (恋爱与生命), Awkward Tragedy (姊姊的悲剧), The Hero of the Sea (海上英雄), The History of the Greenwood (绿林艳史) and The Night Half Song (夜半歌声).

Her fate is unknown. She went to Hong Kong after the Japanese invasion in 1937, but was unable to work. She found love and lived as a celebrity, "doing nothing every day, enjoying a leisurely life, going out to the karaoke, ballroom, cafe, singing, dancing." After the Japanese took Hong Kong in 1941, she fled to Chongqing. There was a rumor that she reluctantly married the commander of the Kuomintang troops in the Yunnan, a second wife, and was beaten and locked up after trying to flee, possibly committing suicide.

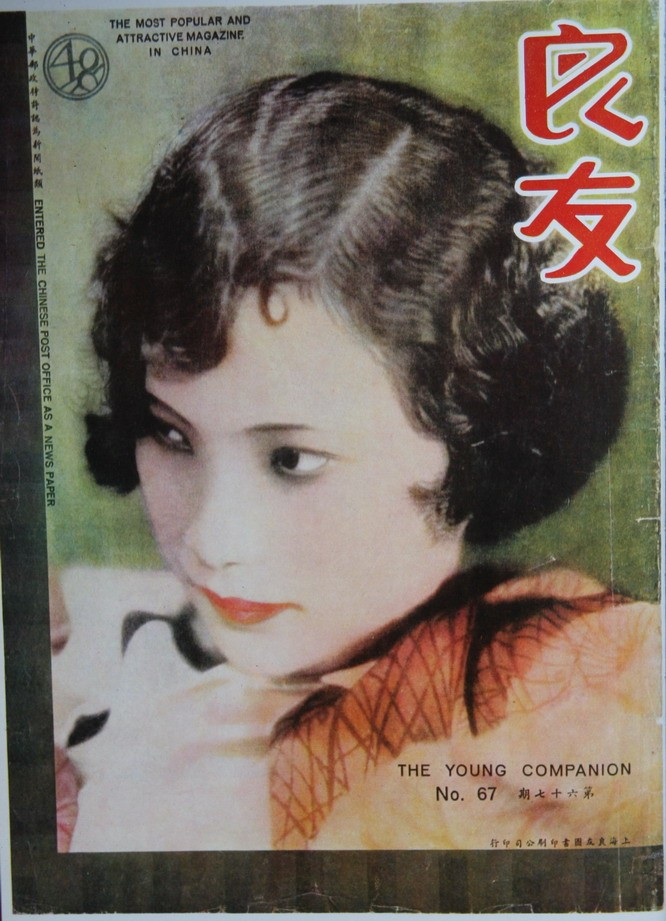
Hu Ping on the cover of The Young Companion also known as the Liangyou pictorial, issue 67 in 1932

== Career ==
Hu Ping was working in a Changsha coffee shop when she was discovered by Chinese playwright Tian Han. Han, already making a living as a playwright, would later become known nationally as the writer of China's national anthem.

Han introduced her into the world of acting, first on the stage in plays, and later into movie acting. He took her to the Southern Drama Club in Shanghai where she got experience acting in plays such as Street Man and Scrambled Clock.

== Movies ==
=== Drama Alliance or Union Film Company (友联影片公司) ===
- 1931 The Heroes of the Sea (海上英雄)
- 1931 History of Greenwood (绿林艳史)

=== Star film company (明星影片公司) ===
- 1932 Love and Life (恋爱与生命), filmmaker
- 1932 The Tragedy of You or Awkward Tragedy (姊姊的悲剧), screenwriter and filmmaker and actress
- 1932 Resurrection of National Spirit (国魂的复活)
- 1932 Battlefield Adventures (战地历险记)
- 1933 Cosmetics market (脂粉市场) Zhang Shichuan director
- 1933 Future (前程)
- 1933 Spring water (春水情波)

=== Yihua film company (艺华影业公司) ===
- 1933 Flame (烈焰)
- 1934 Woman (女人) (Director Shi Dongshan)
- 1934 Golden Age (黄金时代) (Tian Han scriptwriter)
- 1934 Peach Blossom Village (桃花村)
- 1934 Feihua Village
- 1935 The Beginning of Man (人之初) (Hong Shen writer)
- 1935 Hero of our Time or Hero of the Moment (洪深编剧)
- 1935 The Lament of Life by Yang Hanzhen
- 1935 New Peach Fan by Ouyang Yuqian
- 1936 October The Night of Carnival (狂歡之夜)

=== Xinhua Film Company (新华影业公司) ===
She transferred into Xinhua in 1936.

- 1937 July Youth March (青年进行曲) directed by Shi Dongshan
- 1937 Song of the Night (夜半歌声) directed by Ma Xuweibang
