= Sun Yu (director) =

Chinese film director (1900–1990)

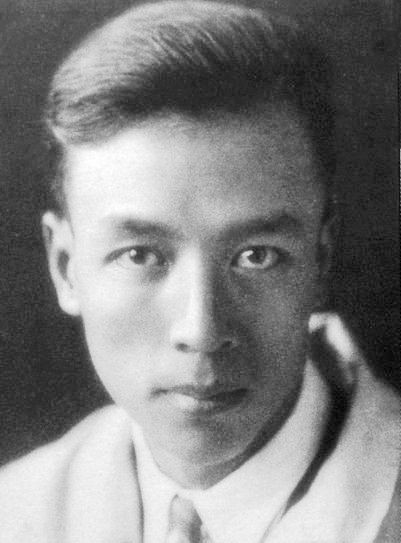
- Born: March 21, 1900; Chongqing, China
- Died: July 11, 1990 (aged 90); Shanghai
- Occupation: Film director

Chinese name
- Traditional Chinese: 孫瑜
- Simplified Chinese: 孙瑜
Transcriptions
Standard Mandarin
- Hanyu Pinyin: Sūn Yú

Sun Yu (March 21, 1900 – July 11, 1990) was a major leftist film director active in the 1930s in Shanghai. One of the core directors of the Lianhua Film Company, Sun Yu made a name for himself with a series of socially conscious dramas in the early to mid-1930s. After the Japanese invasion of China in 1937, Sun Yu made his way to the interior, where he continued to make films glorifying the war effort against the Japanese.

His career took a turn for the worse after the Communist victory in 1949. In The Life of Wu Xun, Sun Yu's big-budget biographical picture of the titular Qing Dynasty educator, Sun attracted the wrath of Mao Zedong, who personally criticized the film in an essay. Though Sun never fully recovered from the episode, he has regained his reputation as one of the foremost filmmakers of the golden age of Chinese cinema.

Besides his work in cinematography, Sun Yu is known as a poet and translator, with two translations of Li Po's poems appearing in Poetry magazine in 1926, and a full-length book of selected Li Po poems with translations and commentary appearing in 1982.

Sun Yu's films Playthings (Little Toys) (1933), Daybreak (1933), Sports Queen (1934), and The Great Road (The Big Road) (1934) are available with English subtitles on YouTube.

== Biography ==
Sun Yu was born in the city of Chongqing and educated first at Tsinghua University in Beijing before continuing his education in drama at the University of Wisconsin–Madison.

After taking his degree in 1925, Sun enrolled at the New York Institute of Photography, where his courses included cinematography and film editing. He also took evening courses at Columbia University in screenwriting and other, related courses. During this time he also audited a series of lectures on writing for the theater given by David Belasco which influenced him greatly.

Upon returning to China in the summer of 1926, Sun Yu directed his first film, A Romantic Swordsman, with the faltering Minxin Film Company. Beginning in the 1930s, Sun Yu began a collaboration with the leftist film studio, Lianhua, where he became one of the core group of "socially conscious" directors along with Cai Chusheng, Fei Mu, and others. While with Lianhua, Sun directed some of his most lasting works, including Wild Rose (1932), Loving Blood of the Volcano (1932), Daybreak (1933), Little Toys (1933), and The Big Road (1934).

With the outbreak of the full-fledged war with Japan in 1937, Sun, like many of his colleagues, fled to the interior to the Nationalist wartime capital of Chongqing where he directed several propaganda films praising the war effort.

Upon the end of the war, Sun Yu began preparing for his most important production yet, a biographical epic of the Qing Dynasty educator, Wu Xun, who spread literacy among the common people. Sun's last major work, The Life of Wu Xun was made with the Kunlun Film Company and starred one of the top actors of the day, Zhao Dan, in the titular role. Shortly after its release, however, The Life of Wu Xun was personally denounced by Mao Zedong. In the People's Daily Mao attacked Wu Xun as a liberal whose literacy programs implied that revolution was not necessary. The flurry of criticism that Mao's denunciation triggered was the "first major politico-ideological campaign" of the post-1949 revolution, and its effects were immediate. As a result, Sun Yu's reputation was soon in ruins, and his career effectively stalled. Sun Yu would go on to direct only a handful of titles over the next twenty years. In 1985, thirty-five years after the release of The Life of Wu Xun, members of the Chinese politburo finally admitted that Mao's campaign, and the criticisms that it instigated against the film, was essentially baseless.

Sun Yu died in Shanghai in 1990.

== Selected filmography ==
Year	English Title	Chinese Title	Studio	Notes
1928	A Romantic Swordsman	魚叉怪俠	Minxin Film Company	Directorial debut
1930	Spring Dream of an Old Capital	故都春夢	Lianhua Film Company	
1930	Wild Flowers	野草閒花	Lianhua	Also known as Wild Flowers by the Road
1932	Wild Rose	野玫瑰	Lianhua	
1932	Facing the National Crisis	共赴國難	Lianhua	Co-directed with Cai Chusheng, Shi Dongshan, and Wang Cilong
1932	Loving Blood of the Volcano	火山情血	Lianhua	Also known as Volcano in the Blood
1933	Daybreak	天明	Lianhua	
1933	Little Toys	小玩意	Lianhua	
1934	Sports Queen	体育皇后	Lianhua	
1935	The Big Road	大路	Lianhua	
1936	Back to Nature	到自然去	Lianhua	Adapted from The Admirable Crichton
1937	Madman's Rhapsody	瘋人狂想曲	Lianhua	Segment of an anthology film, Symphony of Lianhua
1937	Spring Arrives Everywhere	春到人间	Lianhua	
1950	The Life of Wu Xun	武訓傳	Kunlun Film Company	
1955	Song Jingshi	宋景詩	Shanghai Film Studio	Co-directed with Zheng Junli
1957	Brave the Wind and Waves	乘風破浪	Shanghai	
1958	The Legend of Lu Ban	魯班的傳說	Shanghai	
