= Han Langen =

Actor and film director (1909–1982)

- 韩兰根
- Pronunciation: Hán Lán-gēn
- Born: 29 March 1909; Shanghai, Qing Dynasty
- Died: January 27, 1982 (aged 72); Shanghai, China
- Years active: 1926-1981
- Style: Laurel and Hardy
- Spouse: Amanda Chen (1936-1966)
- Parents: Siming Han (father); Youshen Han (mother)

Han Langen (Chinese: 韩兰根; pinyin: Hán Lán-gēn, 29 March 1909 – 27 January 1982) was a Chinese actor and film director. During his thirty-year film career, he became particularly known for his comic roles collaborating with Yin Xiucen and was nicknamed Skinny Monkey (瘦猴子).

He is one of the most distinctive faces of early Chinese film and appeared in at least 100 films.

== Biography ==
Han comes from a poor family in Shanghai. He dropped out of school at the age of 15. In 1926 his film career began in the martial arts films that were popular at the time. In 1932, Han went to the Lianhua (联华) film company. He appeared in several social realist films in the early 1930s with Ruan Lingyu, Jin Yan, Wang Renmai and Li Lili and, together with Zhang Zhizhi, lightened the serious subject matter with a comic touch as a supporting character. Hans' most important films from this period include Tao hua qi xue ji (The Peach Girl, 1931) by Bu Wancang, as well as Ye meigui (Wild Rose, 1932), Xiao Wanyi (Little Toys, 1933), Ti yu huang hou (Queen of Sports, 1934) and Dalu (The Big Road, 1935) by Sun Yu. In Cai Chusheng's Yu guang qu (Song of the Fishermen, 1934), Han Langen played a leading role. With Wang Renmai he portrays the twin couple Xiao Mao and Xiao Hu, who are perishing due to modernity, fall into poverty and have to earn their living as street singers after small-scale fishing was suppressed by industrial companies.

After 1935, Han was mostly seen as a comic couple with the corpulent Yin Xiucen. Because of their appearance, they were considered the "Laurel and Hardy of the East." Like Stan Laurel, Han was the creative mind of the duo and sometimes also took over the direction. In her film 王老五 (The Bachelors, 1937) directed by Cai Chusheng, Lan Ping played the female lead, who later also became known as Jiang Qing as Mao Zedong's fourth wife. Even after the Japanese occupied Shanghai, Han remained in the city and appeared in comic roles in Japanese-Chinese films during World War II, such as 1944's Noroshi wa Shanghai ni agaru (Signal Fires of Shanghai). He made regular film appearances until 1952, when private film studios in China were nationalized. He then joined a theater group. He made one last film with Yin in 1957 (The Unfinished Comedy), but it was not distributed in cinemas because of the dissolution of the Hundred Flowers Campaign after harsh criticism of the Party, and the beginning of the anti-rightist movement in 1957–58.
