= Yan Yuexian =

Chinese actress

- 严月娴
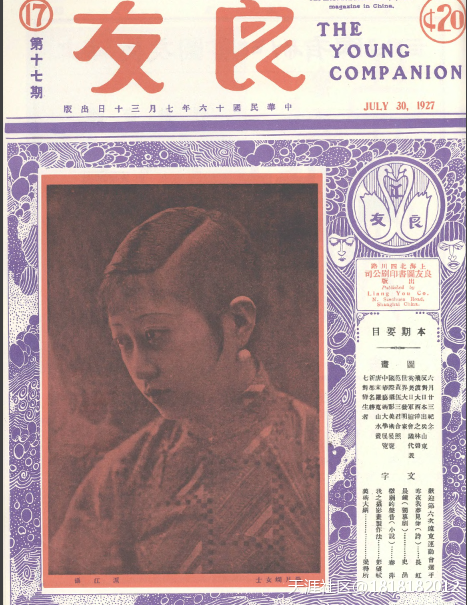
- Yan Yuexian on the cover of the Young Companion magazine, July 1927
- Born: 1911; Shanghai
- Died: 1985
- Occupation: silent-film actress
- Years active: 1925–1944
- Family: She County, Anhui

Yan Yuexian (严月娴), also romanised as Yang Yoo-yea, was a Chinese actress in the silent film industry in Shanghai in the mid 1920s and early 1930s and was the daughter of composer and actor Yan Gongshang 严工上 (1872~1953). Her father made 103 films in addition to his writing and composing. Under her father's influence, she found she enjoyed music and painting. She made her first movie in 1926 as a "child actor" of about 15-years-old, having joined the drama association earlier in 1925.

In her career Yan Yuexian participated in almost 50 films. However, her last big role was her 1941 film Spring Breeze Back to Dreams. An article about her career, Yan Yuezhen: For the sake of the unrequited marriage of the Republic of China implied that a drug-use problem ended her career, as audiences turned away from her. However, later in life, her fans assisted her. In 1982, when she was 71 years old, her situation was hard; she was living alone in Shanghai with no income, relying on her sisters' help from overseas. A fan of her last film, 49 years earlier, helped secure her a good job as a librarian at the Shanghai Literature and History Research Institute.

== Filmography ==
Yan Yuexian participated in nearly 50 films. A selection follows with examples from across her career:

=== Shenzhou Film Company 神州影片公司 ===
- 1926 Difficult for my Sister 难为了妹妹
- 1926 Good Son 好儿子
- 1926 Shanghai Night 上海之夜

=== Great Wall Film Company 长城画片公司 ===
- 1928 Fishing fork 渔叉怪侠

=== Fudan Film Company 复旦影片公司 ===
- 1928 Tongtian River 通天河

=== Star film company 明星影片公司 ===
- 1932 Laughter Marriage啼笑因缘 (six episodes)
- 1932 Loving Mother 慈母
- 1933 Spring Silkworm 春蚕
- 1933 Oppression 压迫
- 1933 Man Jianghong 满江红
- 1934 Three sisters 三姊妹
- 1934 Road Willow Wall Flower 路柳墙花
- 1936 Spring Flower 春之花
- 1937 Xiangxiang Night Rain 潇湘夜雨

=== Guohua Film Company 国华影片公司 ===
- 1939 Night Pearl 夜明珠

=== Huacheng Film Company 华成影片公司 ===
- 1940 Pearl Tower 珍珠塔
- 1941 Spring Breeze Back to Dreams 春风回梦记 (her last performance)

=== China Union Film Company, Ltd. 中华电影联合股份有限公司 ===
- 1944 Come Back 归去来兮
