= Spring Silkworms (film) =

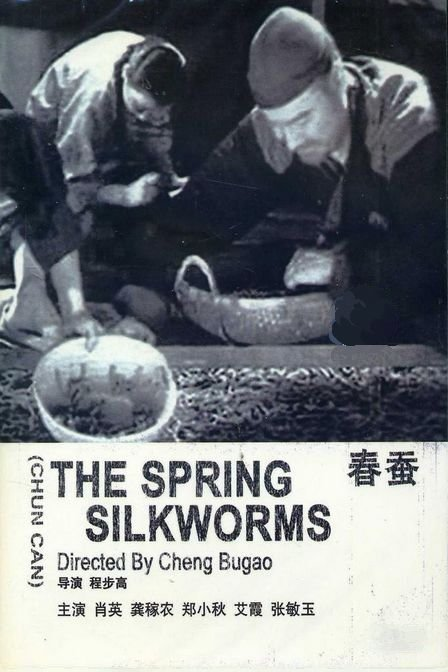
- Film poster
- Chūncán
- Directed by: Cheng Bugao
- Screenplay by: Xia Yan (credited as Cai Shusheng)
- Story by: Mao Dun
- Starring: Gong Jianong; Yan Yuexian
- Cinematography: Wang Shizhen
- Edited by: Han Huang
- Music by: He Zhaozhang
- Production company: Mingxing Film Company
- Release date: 1933
- Running time: 94 minutes (at 25 frames per second)
- Country: China
- Languages: Silent; Written Chinese intertitles

Spring Silkworms (simplified Chinese: 春蚕; traditional Chinese: 春蠶; pinyin: Chūncán) is a 1933 silent film from China. It was directed by Cheng Bugao and was adapted by Xia Yan, who was credited as Cai Shusheng, from the short story written by Chinese author Mao Dun, also called by the same name.

The film stars Gong Jianong, Yan Yuexian, Xiao Ying, Gao Qianping and Ai Xia and was produced by the Mingxing Film Company.The film's production should also be understood in the lens of Mingxing Film Company's commercial pressures. By the early 1930s, Mingxing faced declining box office revenues as its traditional audience for old-style citizen films (旧市民电影) eroded, while rival Lianhua Film Company attracted the new intellectual and student audience with a different production strategy. Mingxing's decision to adapt Mao Dun's story represented a deliberate shift toward cooperation with left-wing literary figures in order to secure market survival.

It follows Old Tong and his family, silk farmers in rural Zhejiang who devote themselves to raising silkworms in hopes of improving their economic situation. However, even though there was a successful harvest, collapsing silk prices and mounting debts left the family in poverty.

Spring Silkworms has been described as the first attempt to bridge serious Chinese literature and cinema, a connection that its commercial failure highlighted rather than resolved. Today, the film is considered one of the earliest films of the leftist movement in 1930s Shanghai. In addition, it is also considered an early example of social realism in Chinese cinema.

== Plot ==
Spring Silkworms opens in a rural Zhejiang town during a period of economic hardship. Villagers crowd into a pawnshop, where household goods and clothes are exchanged for small amounts of money. Agricultural prices have fallen sharply, leaving many farming families unable to make a living from their labour. Among them is Old Tong Bao(老通宝), the head of a silkworm-rearing household. His elder son, A Si（阿四）, is dutiful and traditional in outlook, while his younger son, A Duo（阿多）, is more pragmatic and skeptical of superstition, reflecting different responses within the household to their economic situation. Burdened by debt and previous years of poor returns, they places all of them hopes on the coming spring silkworm season. Believing that a successful harvest will allow the family to repay its debts and improve its circumstances, they purchases silkworm eggs and prepare for the season despite severe financial pressure.

As the silkworms begin to hatch, the family devotes itself entirely to their care. The household works day and night, gathering mulberry leaves, maintaining the silkworm sheds, and protecting the crop. During this period, village superstitions became increasingly influential. Lotus(莲花), the wife of a neighbouring farmer, is regarded by some villagers as a source of bad luck. Members of Tong Bao's family blame her for setbacks and try to prevent her from approaching the silkworm sheds. The family's expenses continue to rise as mulberry leaves become more expensive. Unable to meet these costs, Tong Bao is forced to borrow additional money at high interest. Nevertheless, he remains convinced that a good harvest will solve the family's problems.

As silkworms mature, tensions within the community increase. Lotus becomes the target of suspicion and hostility, with villagers blaming her for bringing bad luck. Angered by the way she is treated, she steals silkworms from the Tong family and throws them into a river.

Despite difficult weather conditions, mounting debt, and constant anxiety, the family succeeds in raising a healthy crop. The silkworms produce an abundant harvest of large, high-quality cocoons. Relieved and excited, family members begin imagining how the profits might be used to repay debts, purchase necessities, and improve their lives.

Their hopes are shattered when they bring the cocoons to market. Economic disruption and declining demand have caused silk prices to collapse. Many silk-reeling factories have reduced operations or closed altogether, and buyers offer extremely low prices for the harvest. Although the family has achieved one of its best harvests, the sale of the cocoons generates little income and fails to cover the costs of production.

The film ends with the Tong family facing continued debt and uncertainty. Their experience demonstrates how a successful harvest is insufficient to overcome the larger economic forces shaping rural life, leaving them trapped in poverty despite their labour and perseverance.

== Cast ==
- Gong Jianong (龚建农) as Old Tong Bao (佟保) – the family patriarch struggling to sustain his silkworm business.
- Yan Yuexian (严月娴) as Lotus – a neighbor's wife, who becomes a scapegoat for the family's misfortunes.
- Xiao Ying (肖影) as Ah San's Wife – the supportive daughter-in-law who works alongside her husband.
- Ai Xia (艾霞) – supporting role as a family member or villager.
- Gao Qianping (高潜平) – supporting role as a member of the village community.
- Zheng Xiaoqiu (郑小秋) – supporting role
- Wang Zhengxin (王正心) – supporting role as an elder or villager.
- Gu Meijun (顾梅君) – supporting role as a family or community member.
- Zhang Minyu (张敏玉) – supporting role as a villager or business associate.

== Title ==
The title Spring Silkworms metaphorically represents the self-sacrificial labor of the rural peasant family portrayed in the film. In traditional Chinese culture, silkworms are seen as creatures that work tirelessly, spinning silk until they die, which symbolises dedication and suffering. The film uses this image to comment on the economic exploitation and cyclical poverty faced by silk farmers in the 1930s Zhejiang. The silkworm metaphor also reflects the broader fate of Chinese peasants caught in feudal systems and emerging capitalist pressures.

Scholars such as Zhang Zhen have noted that the film's title functions as a critical lens for understanding how leftist cinema aimed to expose class struggle through naturalistic allegory.

Throughout the film, silkworms serve as a recurring motif that connects the major stages of the narrative, from the purchase of silkworm eggs and the cultivation of the crop to the harvesting and sale of the cocoons. The family's hopes, fears, labour, and financial future are all tied to the fate of the silkworms. In the film's final sequence, the abundant harvest of healthy cocoons stands in sharp contrast to the Tong family's worsening economic condition. Although the silkworms have produced a successful harvest, the family remains burdened by debt and poverty.

== Influence & inspiration ==
Spring Silkworms has been discussed by scholars as part of the emergence of a distinct strand of socially engaged Chinese cinema in 1930s Shanghai. Alongside films such as Ying Yunwei’s Plunder of Peach and Plum (1934) and Yuan Muzhi’s Street Angel (1937), it is often grouped within a broader movement of politically conscious filmmaking that sought to depict social inequality, rural hardship, and national crisis. In contrast to Hollywood narrative conventions, these films frequently employed more realist visual styles, including stark camerawork and open or inconclusive endings. At the same time, they often incorporated popular entertainment elements, such as musical sequences, in order to maintain audience appeal. Scholars note that these works commonly juxtapose images of wealth and modernity with scenes of poverty and social marginalization, reflecting broader tensions between capitalist and socialist interpretations of Chinese society.

The film was directly inspired by Mao Dun's 1932 short story of the same name, the first story in his acclaimed Village Trilogy (Spring Silkworms, Autumn Harvest (秋收), and Winter Ruin (残冬). Its adaptation was driven by the urgent social climate following Japan's 1931 invasion of Manchuria, which devastated the film industry and led studios like Mingxing Film to seek socially relevant content.

On January 1, 1933, Mingxing Film published a major advertisement outlining two projects: one on 5000 years of Chinese history, and another producing documentaries highlighting key national industries like silk, tea, coal, and salt. Mao Dun's story about silkworm farmers perfectly aligned with this second industrial project. As left-wing intellectuals increasingly focused on film, Mao Dun's realistic novels became the natural choice.

== Reception ==
When the film first came out, it sparked a lot of discussion and debate among viewers. However, despite the filmmakers hoping the movie would change what the audiences wanted to see, it did not sell many tickets. Director Cheng Bugao later talked about this box office failure, saying he felt he had "let the company down," but added that he “still felt he’d done the right thing for himself”.

This financial disappointment led the Star Film Company to change direction. They decided to focus on making “new citizen” cinema. Using the popular family stories and moral themes from older, successful movies to guarantee audience interest but also including some of the left-wing elements that the changing culture demanded

== Cinematic techniques ==
Framing - The individual rectangular photographs on a strip of motion picture film which, when run through a projector, yield the impression of movement owing to slight variations in the position of the objects being photographed.

- Characters are often framed within window frames or doorways, suggesting to the viewer their lack of freedom within society. This is apparent when one scene shows the farmer behind (25:12), at first glance, could be jail cell bars, alluding to being a prisoner of societal pressures and rules, but it is actually just the window to his house. The next scene confirms this with a panning shot of everyone inside working on some part of the silkworm harvesting process.

Shot- the basic element of filmmaking—a piece of film run through the camera, exposed, and developed; an uninterrupted run of the camera; or an uninterrupted image on film.

- Low-angle shot: a shot taken from a camera that is positioned much lower than the subject being filmed, so that the effect is that of looking up at the subject.
- High-angle shot: a shot taken from a camera that is positioned much higher than the subject being filmed, so that the effect is that of looking down on the subject.
- To establish power dynamics, the use of angled shots helps tremendously. At one point during the film (33:24), using a medium shot, the farmer hears that some of the silkworms have gone bad, and he turns his body, squared, chest open towards the camera. He menacingly stares at the woman, then pushes her to the ground. At (33:40), there is a close-up low-angled shot of the man staring down at the woman and berating her for her inability to keep the silkworms alive. Following this, (34:06) a medium high-angle shot shows the power dynamic between the man and woman for a moment, having her pitifully on the ground, collecting her thoughts and recovering.

The film is heavily made up of static, medium to long shots, often held for a long period of time. Shortly into the film, (7:26-8:15), the audience receives their first example of this as it roughly takes 40 seconds for the audience to watch the farmer gather his possessions, get off the ground, and then start to walk away, ending the shot. The use of this technique emphasizes the slow nature that is rural, poverty stricken life.

- Pan: when the camera itself is stationary but pivots on its axis from side to side, it is called a pan. This movement reveals new information, follows a character, or adds energy to a shot.
- We see this at the beginning of the film(6:28-7:01) when the farmer is being shown his two options for his future. The scene starts with a shot of the farmer slowly turning towards the mulberry leaves, the next shot is a still image of the mulberry bushes looking full and worthy of his choice in career. Then it cuts back to himself giving a look of pride and excitement in his future selling mulberry leaves. The next shot holds the image of a building across the water, a pan camera movement reveals the building is the location where one can buy "Spring and Fall Silkworm Cocoons". The use of the pan technique is for the audience to see that we are being introduced to something important and that it hold meaning.
- There are other times throughout the film where film makers used a panning to establish something. Many times, it is to show the families dynamic and what labour they participate in.
- At (10:38-11:02), the scene pans back and forth from each side of the river where the community are washing woven trays used in their silkworm harvesting. The use of the pan movement helps to reveal a sense of community and family dynamics explored throughout the film.

Set design - Often seen in the house, there is lots of clutter and things around them, while they themselves look to be cramped in the space they live. The usage of cramped and tight spaces with an abundance of things around them filling space, reads to the audience that they live in tight confinement due to their economic situation. This also alludes to how dire their situation is, if they do not get enough silk this season, their living conditions will worsen.

- The mise-en-scène accurately portrays how a southern Chinese village would look like, using realistic props, costumes they wore, and natural elements to create authenticity. We see this in the silk harvesting production, the tools they use to achieve their goals, and in how they dress as well.

Montage - To a film sequence that relies on editing to condense or expand action, space, or time. The effect is often that of a rapid-fire series of interrelated images. There are the occasional use of montages throughout the film. Mostly they are short and used to represent the collective labour of the group when they are tending to their silkworms. These sequences are used to help the audience create empathy towards how hard they have to work in order to survive until the next season. There always feels to be a level of high risk and stakes throughout the film, but the montages sometimes will mask that through the use of upbeat music.

- A short montage occurs at (54:25-55) after it is suggested they all get rest because they have been awake, working for 5 days taking care of the silkworms. The montage uses short, low-light shots of the household sleeping, or resting in various locations. It gets interrupted by a fast-paced pan over the women suggesting that something sneaky will occur.
