= Cheng Bugao =

Chinese film director

- Born: 1898; Zhejiang, China
- Died: 20 June 1966 (aged 67–68); Hong Kong
- Occupation(s): Film director, Screenwriter, Producer
- Years active: 1930s-1960s

Cheng Bugao (1898–20 June 1966) (Chinese: 程步高) was a prominent Chinese film director during the 1930s. Employed by the Mingxing Film Company, Cheng was responsible for several important "leftist" films in the period, including the Wild Torrents (1933) and Spring Silkworms (1933). Both films were based on screenplays by Xia Yan.

After the Second Sino-Japanese War, Cheng moved to Hong Kong, where he made films of a purposefully apolitical nature.

== Partial directorial filmography ==
| Year | English Title | Chinese Title | Notes |
|---|---|---|---|
| 1924 | A Couple Through Water and Fire | | |
| 1925 | Tears on the Battlefield | | stars ZHOU Wenzu |
| 1927 | Seeking Love on the Field of Romance | | stars HAN Yunzhen |
| 1928 | A Stressful Wedding | | stars HU Die, ZHENG Xiaoqiu |
| 1928 | The Heroine in Black | | stars DING Ziming, ZHENG Xiaoqiu |
| 1929 | Divorce | | stars GONG Jianong, HU Die |
| 1929 | Blood of the Lovers | | stars HU Die, ZHENG Xiaoqiu |
| 1929 | Papa Loves Mama | | also known as Dad Loves Mom |
| 1929 | The Life of the Rich | | stars HU Die, ZHU Fei |
| 1929 | Young Hero Liu Jin | | stars ZHENG Xiaoqiu |
| 1933 | Wild Torrent | 狂流 | |
| 1933 | Spring Silkworms | 春蚕 | stars Ai Xia |
| 1934 | Shared Hate | 同仇 | |
| 1934 | To the Northwest | 到西北去 | |
| 1934 | The Classic for Girls | 女儿经 | Co-directed with Zhang Shichuan, Yao Sufeng, Zheng Zhengqiu, Xu Xingfu, Li Pingqian, Chen Kengran, and Shen Xiling |
| 1935 | Ardent, Loyal Souls | 热血忠魂 | Co-directed with Zhang Shichuan, Wu Cun, Zheng Zhengqiu, Xu Xingfu, Li Pingqian, and Shen Xiling |
| 1936 | Old and New Shanghai | 新旧上海滩 | |
| 1936 | Little Lingzi | 小玲子 | |
| 1949 | Heavenly Souls | 锦绣天堂 | |
| 1949 | Virtue in the Dust | 春城花落 | |
| 1951 | Prisoner of Love | 爱的俘虏 | |
| 1954 | The Old and New Loves | 旧爱新欢 | |
| 1954 | The Merry-Go-Round | 欢喜冤家 | |
| 1957 | Ming Phoon | 鸣凤 | Based on the novel by Ba Jin |
| 1957 | The Fairy Dove | 小鸽子姑娘 | |
| 1958 | The Street Boy | 慈母顽儿 | |
| 1958 | The Nature of Spring | 有女怀春 | |
| 1959 | Wonderful Thoughts | 机伶鬼与小懒猫 | |
| 1960 | Comedy of 100 Girls | 脂粉小霸王 | |
| 1961 | The Lady Racketeer | 美人计 | |

== See also ==
- Mingxing Film Company
