= The Burning of the Red Lotus Temple =

Lost 1928 Chinese silent film serial

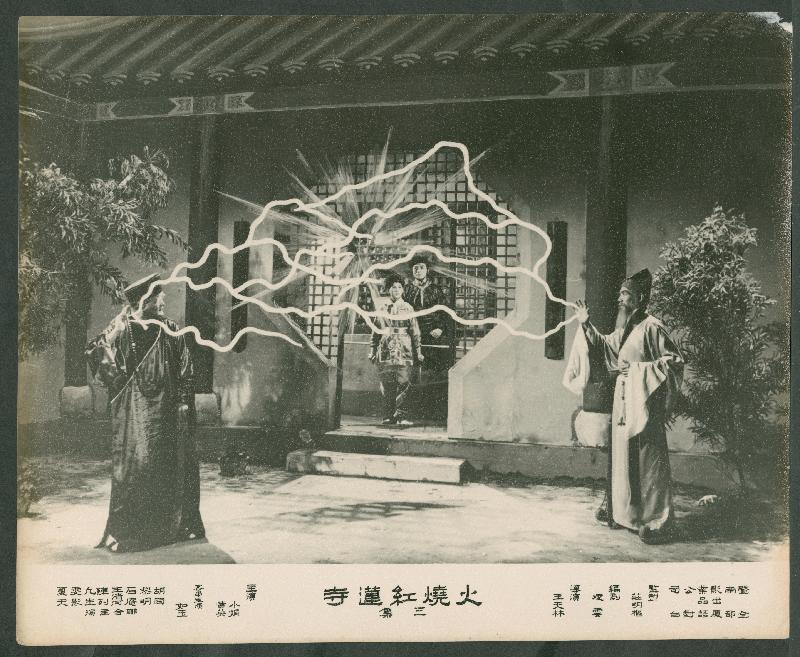
- Lobby card
- 火燒紅蓮寺
- Directed by: Zhang Shichuan
- Written by: Zheng Zhengqiu; Shang K'ai-jan
- Starring: Hu Die
- Production company: Mingxing Film Company
- Running time: 1,620 minutes
- Country: China

The Burning of the Red Lotus Temple (火燒紅蓮寺) is a lost Chinese silent film serial directed by Zhang Shichuan, widely considered to be the founding father of Chinese cinema. The film is adapted from the novel The Tale of the Extraordinary Swordsman.

The Burning of the Red Lotus Temple, in 16 parts, is among the longest films ever produced and the longest major release, running 27 hours in total. The Mingxing Film Company production was released in 19 feature-length parts between 1928 and 1931. No copies have survived. The craze of the film series eventually led the Kuomintang government to ban all wuxia films by the early 1930s because wuxia was thought to be inciting anarchy and rebellion.

== See also ==
- List of lost films
- List of longest films
