= List of Mingxing films =

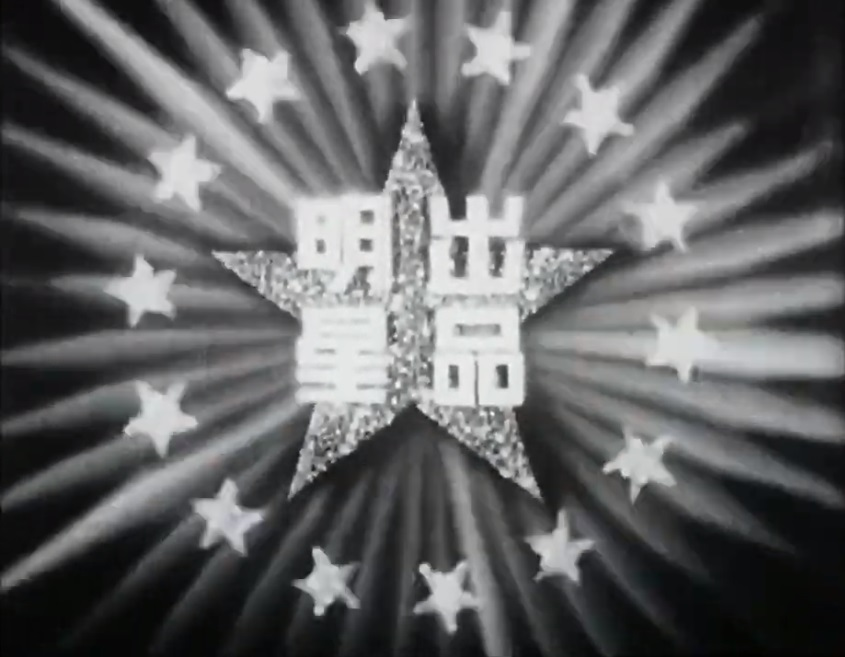
The production logo for the Mingxing Film Company

Mingxing was a film production company based in Shanghai, the Republic of China. Between its establishment in 1922 and 1938, the year after it closed in the face of the Second Sino-Japanese War, it released 174 narrative films. The company's output consisted of 128 silent films and 46 sound films. Of the company's productions, 69 were directed or co-directed by Zhang Shichuan; another 55 were credited to Zheng Zhengqiu.

== History ==
Co-founded by the dramatists and media entrepreneurs Ren Jinping, Zhang Shichuan, Zheng Zhegu, Zheng Zhengqiu, and Zhou Jianyun, Mingxing had its first theatrical releases – a double feature of the short comedies The King of Comedy Visits Shanghai and Labourer's Love – at the Olympic Theatre on 7 October 1922. After two further unsuccessful releases, the company was in dire financial straits. This changed following the release of Orphan Rescues Grandfather (1923), a full-length melodrama that screened to full cinemas in Shanghai and was later distributed throughout China and Southeast Asia. As Mingxing expanded its facilities and began offering shares, it increased its production from three films in 1924 to sixteen in 1928. These included further melodramas with moral lessons and, later, wuxia (martial arts) films. The company's productions expanded to include leftist cinema following the arrival of screenwriters such as Qian Xingcun and Xia Yan in the 1930s. (Note: The communist writers Qian Xingcung and Xia Yan used cinema to advocate a pro-proletarian platform that emphasized social change. This segued well with Zheng Zhengqiu's belief that film should promote social progress as an educational platform. As the ruling Kuomintang had massacred communists in the late 1920s, these writers avoided openly voicing their affiliation (Xiao 1998, p. 14).)

On 15 March 1931, Mingxing released Sing-Song Girl Red Peony – the first full sound film produced in China. (Note: Dialogue and singing were recorded to a phonograph cylinder and played alongside the film during screenings (Xiao 1998, p. 17).) In subsequent years, Mingxing continued to produce silent and sound films in conjunction, with its final silent film – Season of Falling Flowers – being released on 27 April 1935. Though experiencing some economic difficulties, Mingxing continued to expand, opening a second studio in June 1936. However, with the escalation of the Second Sino-Japanese War, including the Japanese occupation of Shanghai, the studio was forced to close in 1937. Several already-completed films were screened the following year.

The majority of Mingxing's 174 films, as with most early Chinese films, are considered lost. Early films were shot on volatile nitrate film, which was easily destroyed, and many experienced material degradation. Further contributing to the loss of historical films were internal turbulence and international conflict; for instance, Mingxing's warehouse was damaged during the Japanese bombing of Shanghai in 1932. Twenty-four productions are known to have survived, including Labourer's Love, the oldest surviving Chinese film. Some films, such as An Amorous History of the Silver Screen (1931), are known only to have survived in the China Film Archive, while others, such as The Classic for Girls (1934), have seen home release.

== List of films ==
This list is divided into two tables, one for Mingxing's silent films and one for its sound films. Each table is sorted by release date by default, with further sorting capability in certain fields. Titles are given in English-language translations as well as traditional and simplified Chinese. Films are presented together with their director(s), whose names are rendered using the Chinese naming scheme wherein the surname precedes the given name. The list only counts fictional films produced by the company and does not include films from other genres, such as actualities.

=== Silent films ===
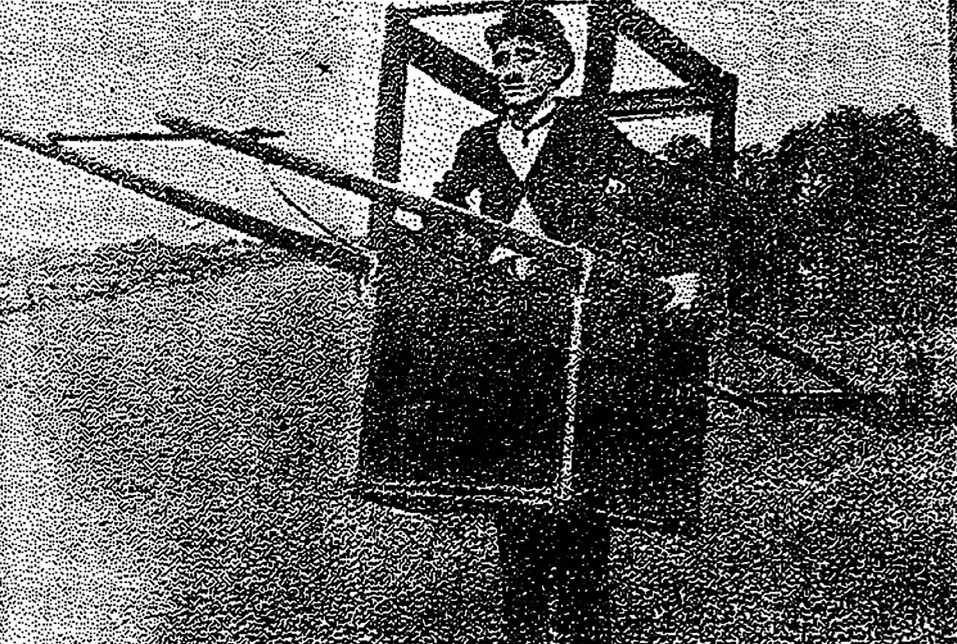
Scene from The King of Comedy Visits Shanghai (1922)

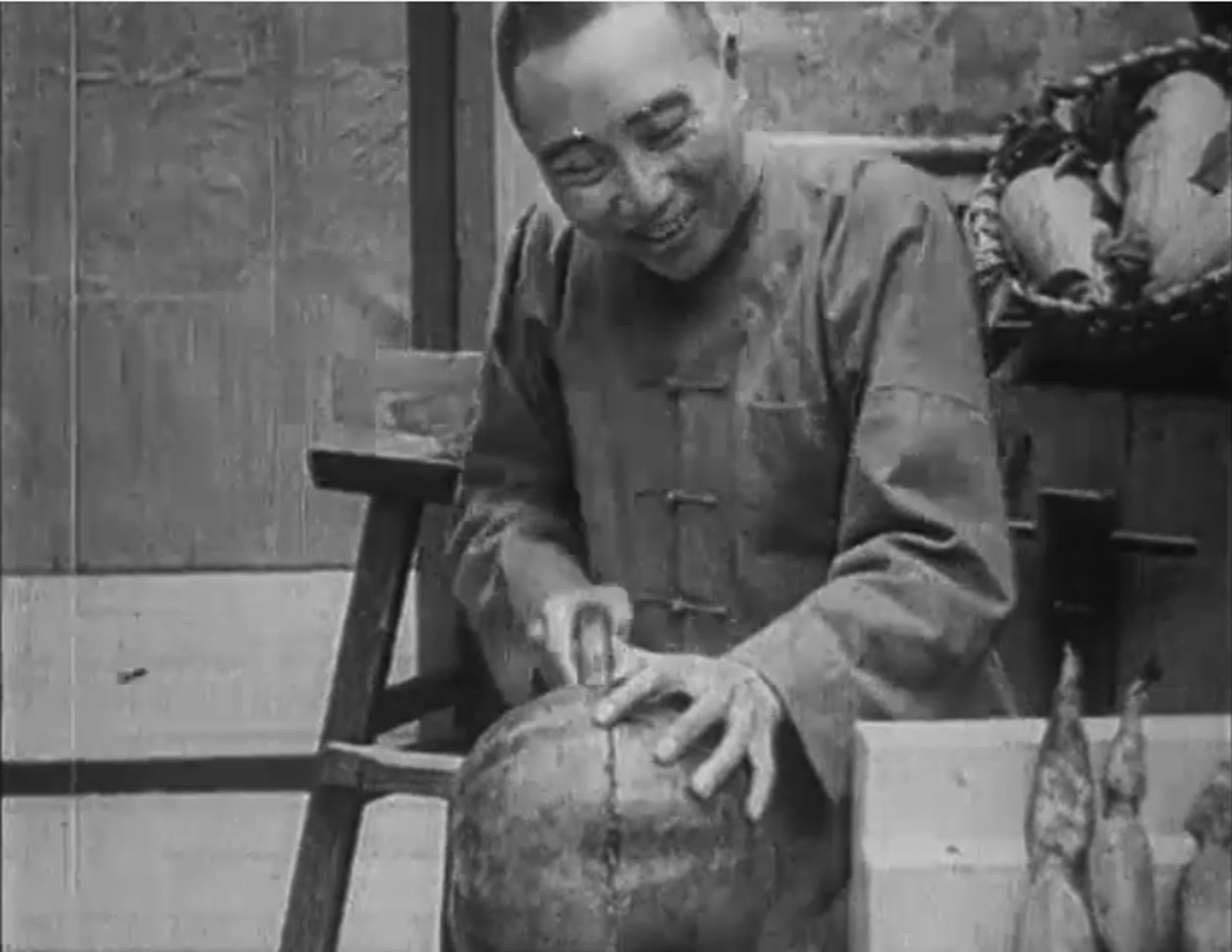
Zheng Zhegu in Labourer's Love (1922)

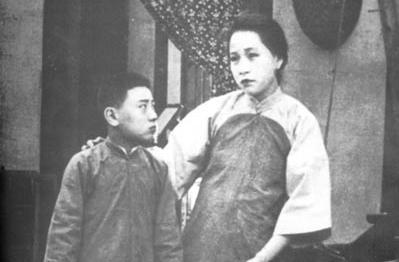
Zheng Xiaoqiu and Wang Hanlun in Orphan Rescues Grandfather (1923)

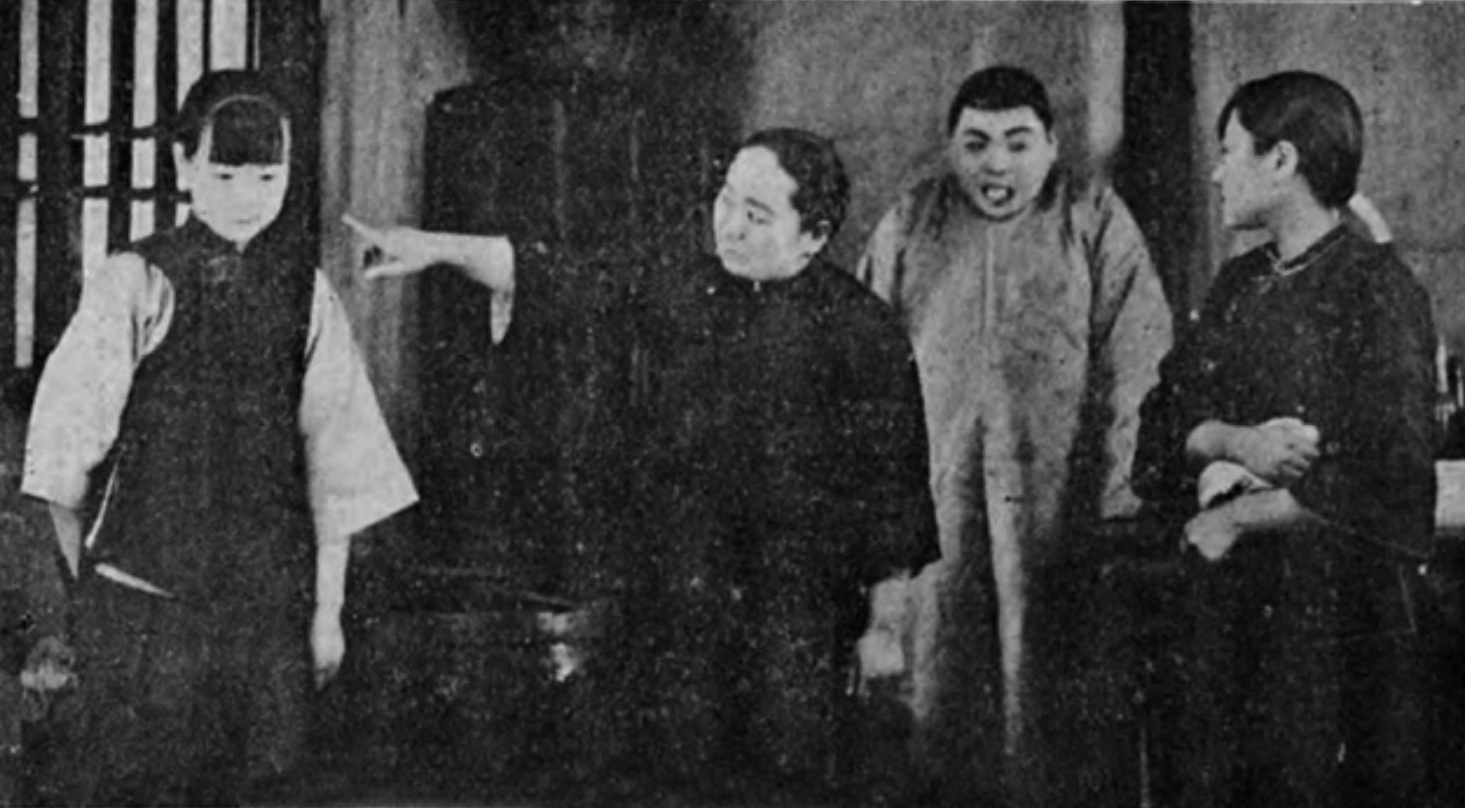
Scene from Last Conscience (1925)

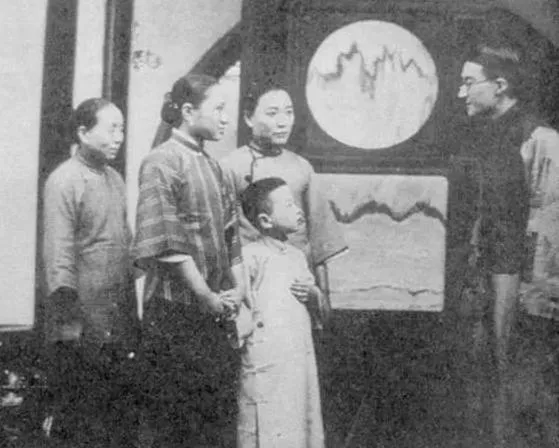
Scene from A Shanghai Woman (1925)

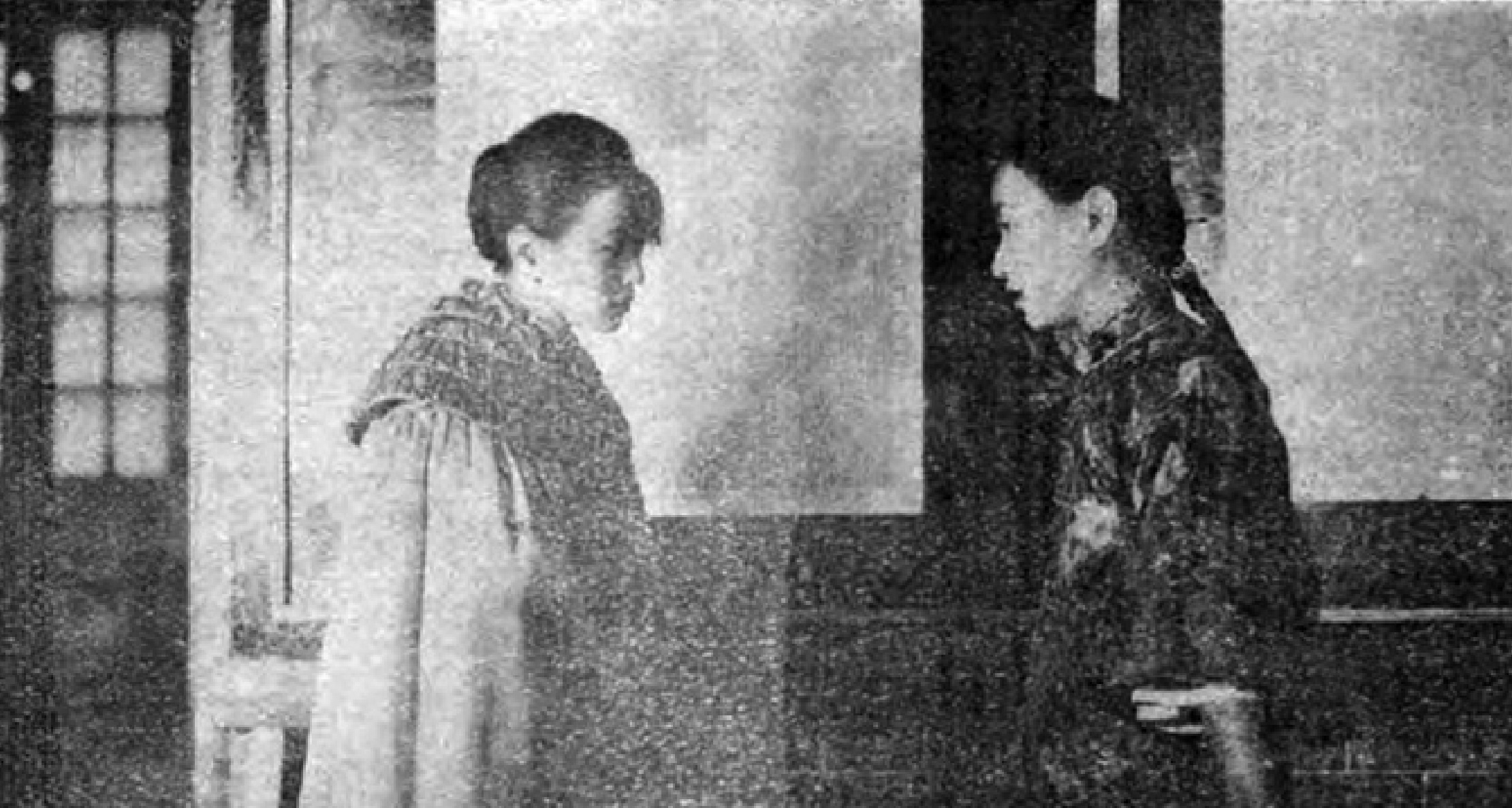
Scene from Lonely Orchid (1926)

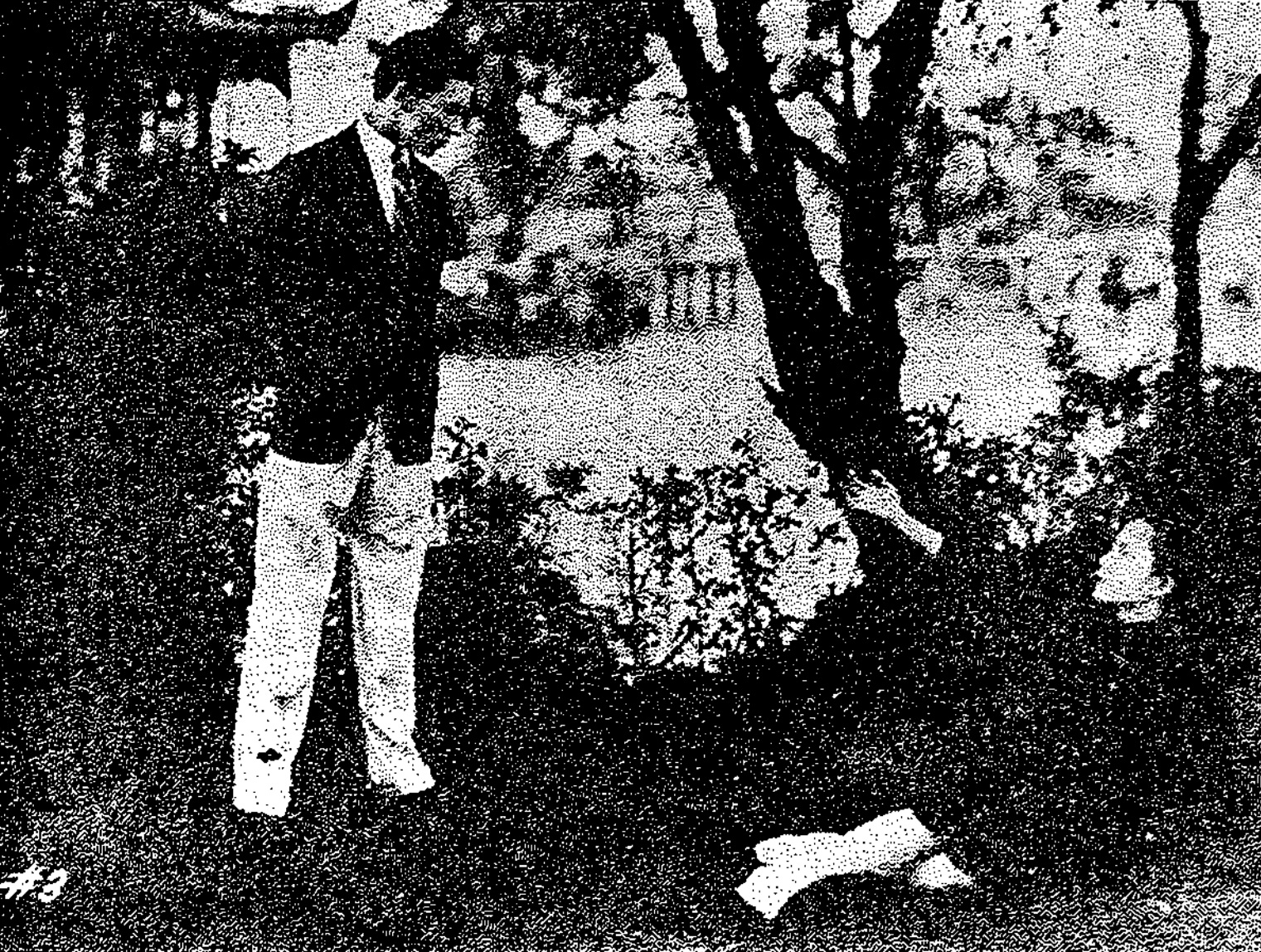
Scene from Dream by the Lake (1927)

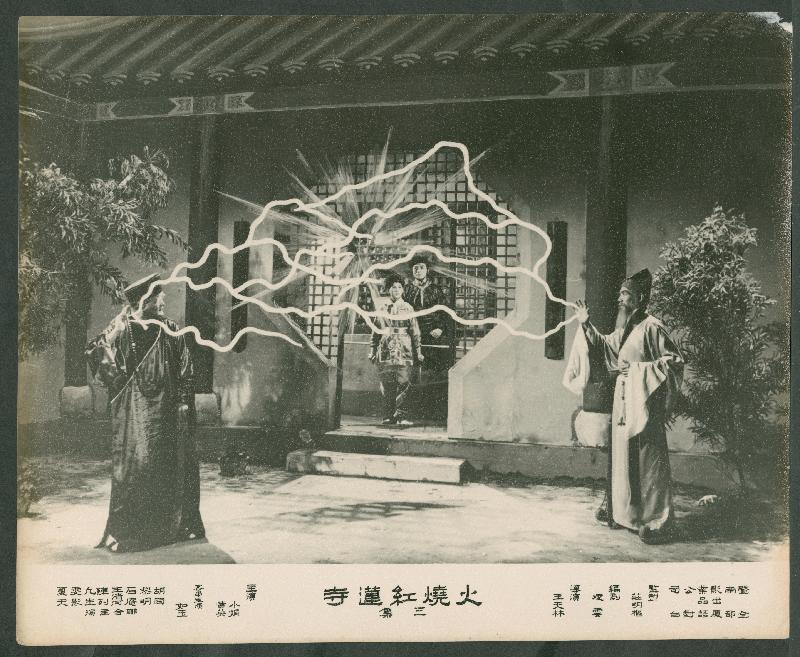
Lobby card for The Burning of the Red Lotus Temple (1928)

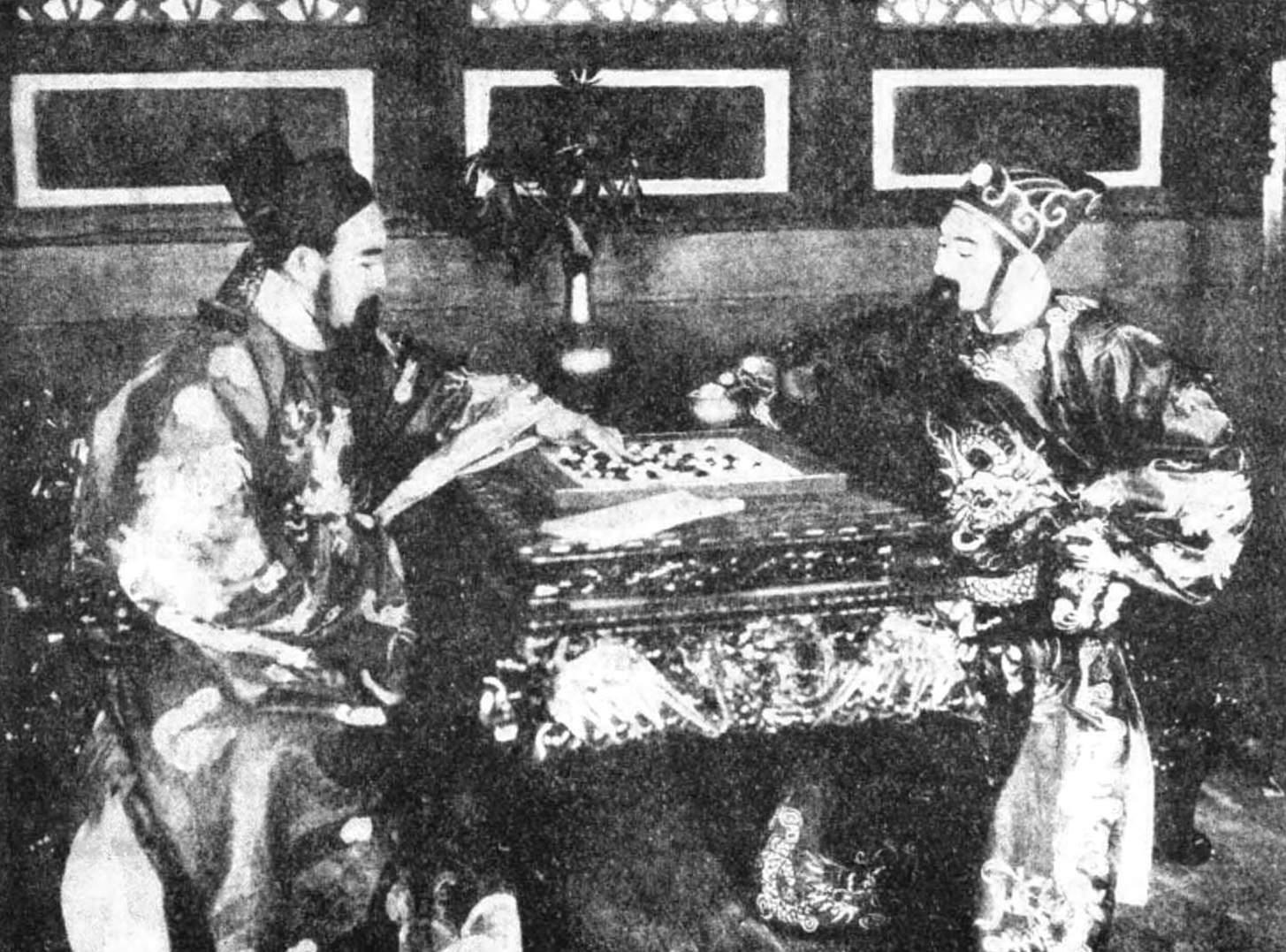
Scene from The Luoyang Bridge (1928)

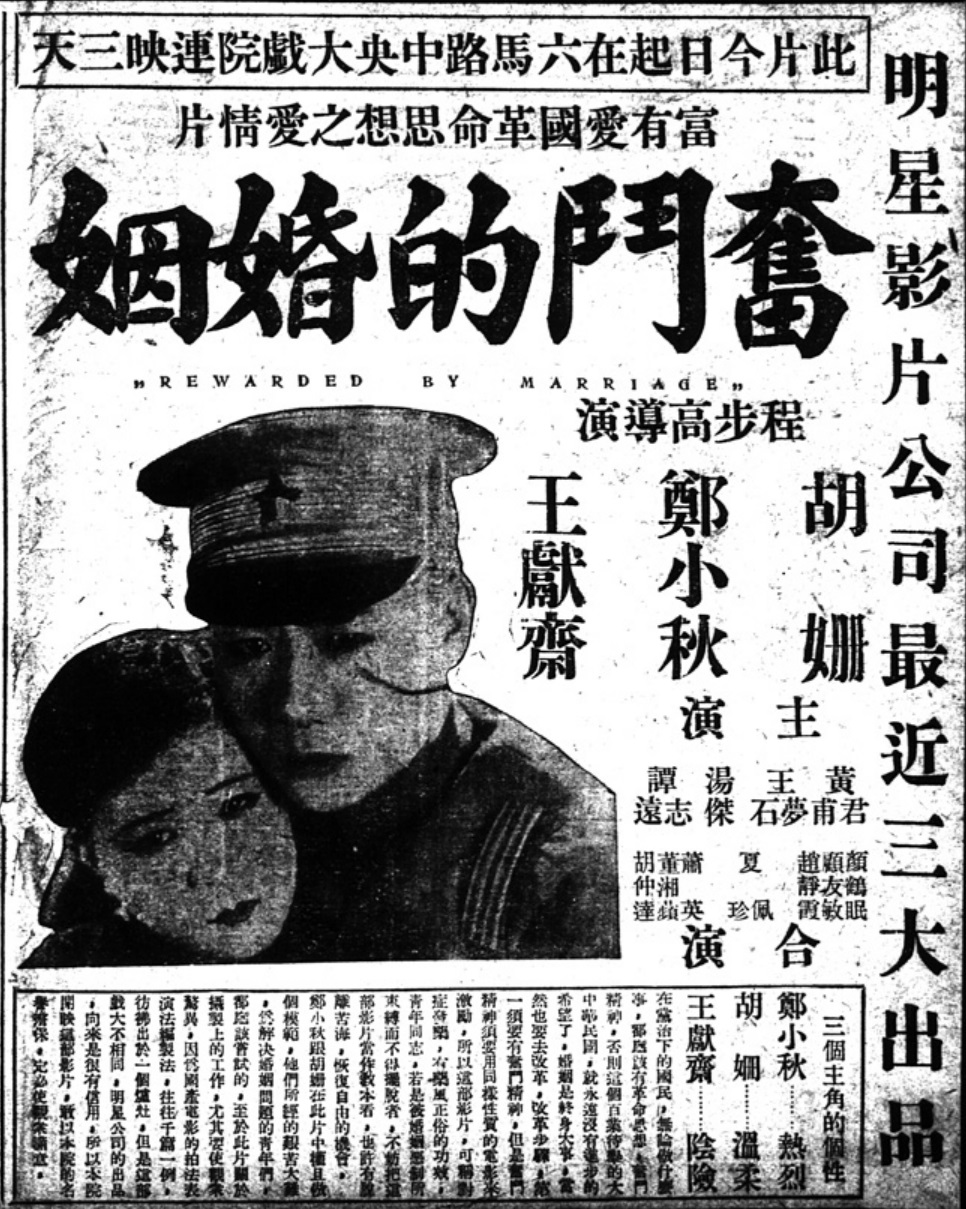
Advertisement for Struggles in Marriage (1928)

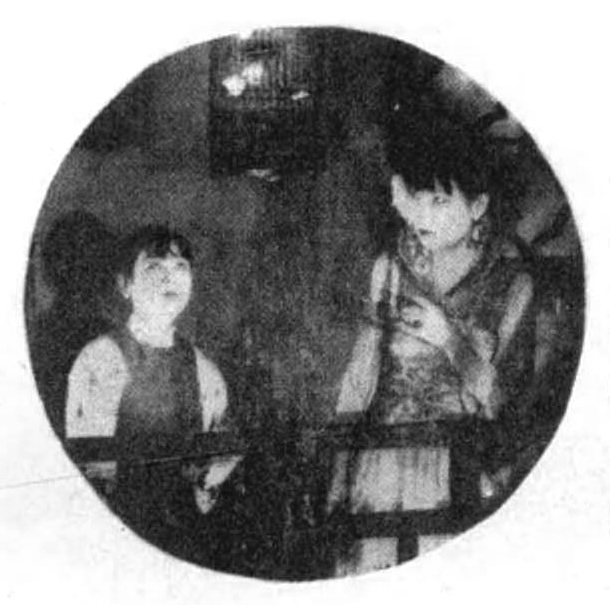
Scene from Beauty Under the Knife (1929)

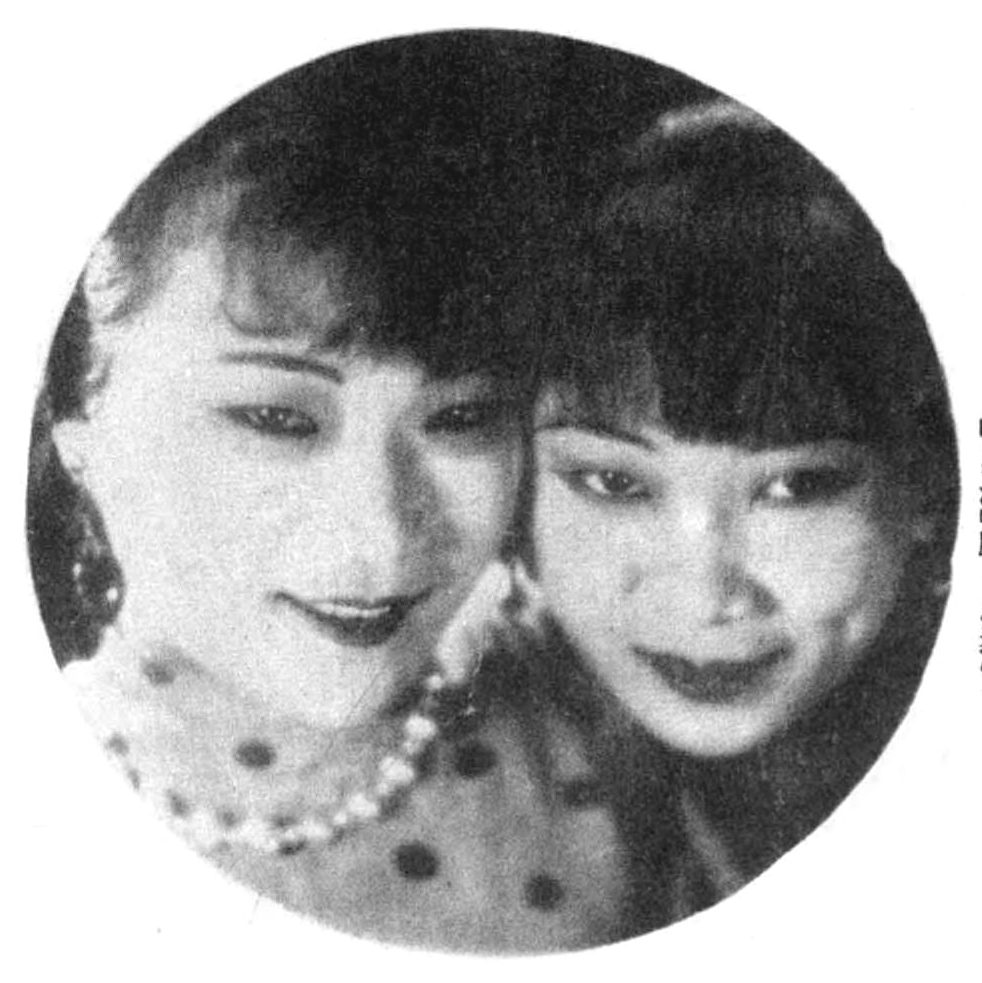
Hu Die and Xia Peizhen in Way of the Rich (1929)

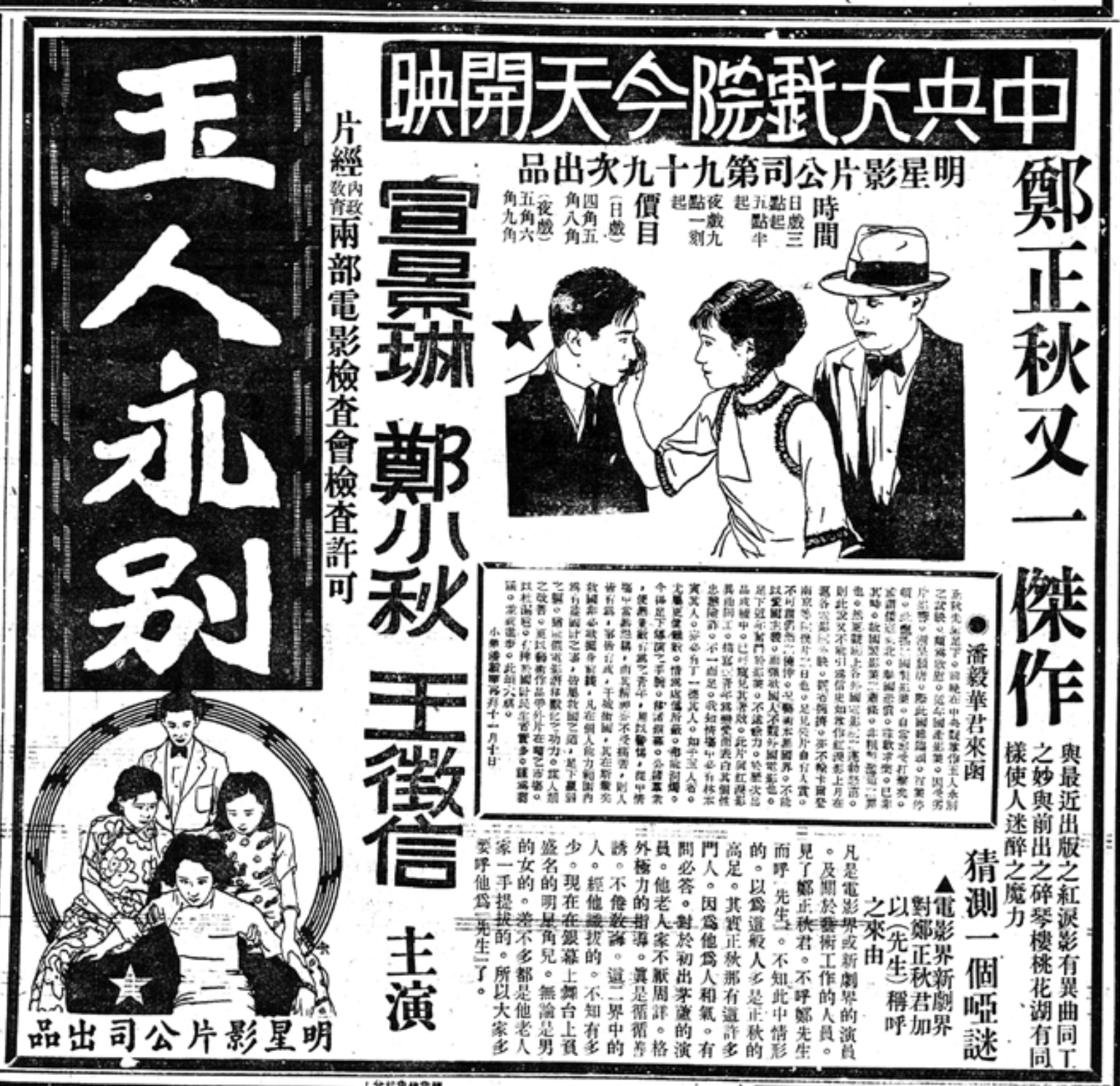
Advertisement for Farewell to a Beauty (1931)

Key
†	Indicates film is extant

The silent films of Mingxing
English title	Traditional Chinese	Simplified Chinese	Première	Director	Ref(s)
The King of Comedy Visits Shanghai	滑稽大王遊滬記	滑稽大王游沪记	5 Oct 1922	Zhang Shichuan	
Labourer's Love †	勞工之愛情	劳工之爱情	5 Oct 1922	Zhang Shichuan	
Havoc in a Bizarre Theatre	大鬧怪戲場	大闹怪戏场	26 Jan 1923	Zhang Shichuan	
Zhang Xinsheng	張欣生	张欣生	16 Feb 1923	Zhang Shichuan	(Note: Also known as Retribution (報應昭彰; 报应昭彰) (Huang 2014, p. 314))
Orphan Rescues Grandfather	孤兒救祖記	孤儿救祖记	21 Dec 1923	Zhang Shichuan	
Jade Pear Spirit	玉梨魂	玉梨魂	9 May 1924	Zhang Shichuan, Xu Hu	
The Poor Children	苦兒弱女	苦儿弱女	21 Jul 1924	Zhang Shichuan	
Forced to Marry	誘婚	诱婚	31 Oct 1924	Zhang Shichuan	(Note: Also known as Love and Vanity (愛情與虛榮; 爱情与虚荣) (Huang 2014, p. 312))
The Good Brother	好哥哥	好哥哥	7 Jan 1925	Zhang Shichuan	
Last Conscience	最後之良心	最后之良心	2 May 1925	Zhang Shichuan	
Little Friends	小朋友	小朋友	30 Jun 1925	Zhang Shichuan	
A Shanghai Woman	上海一婦人	上海一妇人	28 Jul 1925	Zhang Shichuan	
Young Master Feng	馮大少爺	冯大少爷	23 Sep 1925	Hong Shen	(Note: Also known as The Dandy (紈絝子; 纨绔子) (Huang 2014, p. 289))
Blind Orphan Girl	盲孤女	盲孤女	1 Oct 1925	Zhang Shichuan	
A Sincerely Pitiful Girl	可憐的閨女	可怜的闺女	23 Nov 1925	Zhang Shichuan	
A New Family †	新人的家庭	新人的家庭	4 Jan 1926	Ren Jinping	
Lonely Orchid	空谷蘭	空谷兰	13 Feb 1926	Zhang Shichuan	
May You Soon Have a Son	早生貴子	早生贵子	27 Feb 1926	Hong Shen	(Note: Also known as The Old Couple (老伉儷; 老伉俪) (Huang 2014, p. 313))
A Passionate Actress	多情的女伶	多情的女伶	12 Apr 1926	Zhang Shichuan	
A Good Man	好男兒	好男儿	19 May 1926	Zhang Shichuan	
Little Lovers	小情人	小情人	13 Jun 1926	Zheng Zhengqiu	
Roses Bloom Everywhere in April	四月裡底薔薇處處開	四月里底蔷薇处处开	1 Jul 1926	Hong Shen	
Daughter of the Wealthy	富人之女	富人之女	13 Aug 1926	Zhang Shichuan	
Fiancée	未婚妻	未婚妻	4 Sep 1926	Bu Wancang	
Her Pain	她的痛苦	她的痛苦	7 Oct 1926	Zhang Shichuan	
A Child Worker	一個小工人	一个小工人	10 Nov 1926	Zheng Zhengqiu	
Love and Gold	愛情與黃金	爱情与黄金	18 Dec 1926	Zhang Shichuan, Hong Shen	
Resurrection of Conscience	良心復活	良心复活	22 Dec 1926	Bu Wancang	(Note: Also known as Confession (懺悔; 忏悔) (Huang 2014, p. 296))
The Unknown Hero	無名英雄	无名英雄	5 Feb 1927	Zhang Shichuan	
Sacrifice for the Family	為親犧牲	为亲牺牲	20 Feb 1927	Zhang Shichuan	
Fallen Plum Blossoms	梅花落	梅花落	20 Mar 1927	Zhang Shichuan, Zheng Zhengqiu	
A Married Couple in Name Only	掛名的夫妻	挂名的夫妻	30 Apr 1927	Bu Wancang	
Twenty-Eight Beauties	二八佳人	二八佳人	22 May 1927	Zheng Zhengqiu	
Tian Qilang	田七郎	田七郎	26 Jun 1927	Zhang Shichuan	
True and False Daughters	真假千金	真假千金	24 Aug 1927	Zhang Shichuan	
Tablet of Blood and Tears	血淚碑	血泪碑	11 Sep 1927	Zheng Zhengqiu	
Dream by the Lake	湖邊春夢	湖边春梦	9 Oct 1927	Bu Wancang	
A Female Secretary	女書記	女书记	23 Oct 1927	Zhang Shichuan, Hong Shen	(Note: Also known as Ms Wei's Profession (衛女士的職業; 卫女士的职业) (Huang 2014, p. 299))
The Phoenix Knight	俠鳳奇緣	侠凤奇缘	2 Nov 1927	Zhang Shichuan	
Ma Yongzhen From Shandong	山東馬永貞	山东马永贞	4 Dec 1927	Zhang Shichuan	
Concubine Yang Goes to Beijing	北京楊貴妃	北京杨贵妃	1 Jan 1928	Zheng Zhengqiu	(Note: Also known as Yang Xiaozhen (楊小真; 杨小真) (Huang 2014, p. 285))
Chechi Kingdom	車遲國	车迟国	23 Jan 1928	Zhang Shichuan	
The Luoyang Bridge	洛陽橋	洛阳桥	5 Feb 1928	Zhang Shichuan	
Beauty's Gate	美人關	美人关	19 Feb 1928	Bu Wancang	
The Young Mistress' Fan	少奶奶的扇子	少奶奶的扇子	18 Mar 1928	Zhang Shichuan, Hong Shen	
White Cloud Pagoda	白雲塔	白云塔	11 Apr 1928	Zhang Shichuan, Zheng Zhengqiu	(Note: In two episodes (Huang 2014, p. 284))
The Burning of the Red Lotus Temple	火燒紅蓮寺	火烧红莲寺	13 May 1928	Zhang Shichuan	(Note: Released in eighteen episodes between 1928 and 1931 (Huang 2014, p. 41))
Love of Classmates	同学之爱	同学之爱	21 Jun 1928	Zhang Shichuan, Hong Shen	(Note: Also known as Kick Him Out (一腳踢出去; 一脚踢出去) (Huang 2014, p. 306))
A Knight's Revenge	大俠復仇記	大侠复仇记	19 Aug 1928	Zhang Shichuan	(Note: In two episodes (Huang 2014, p. 288))
Heroine in Black	黑衣女俠	黑衣女侠	16 Sep 1928	Zheng Zhengqiu, Cheng Bugao	
Lady Detective †	女偵探	女侦探	14 Nov 1928	Zhang Shichuan	
Struggles in Marriage	奮鬥的婚姻	奋斗的婚姻	9 Dec 1928	Cheng Bugao	
The Lady Knight Rescues a Madame	俠女救夫人	侠女救夫人	19 Dec 1928	Zheng Zhengqiu	
The Love of Huang and Lu	黃陸之愛	黄陆之爱	27 Jan 1929	Zheng Zhengqiu, Cheng Bugao	(Note: Also known as Yellow Flowers in Blood and Tears (血淚黃花前集; 血泪黄花前集) (Huang 2014, p. 285))
Divorce	離婚	离婚	7 Apr 1929	Cheng Bugao	
Confession	懺悔	忏悔	24 Apr 1929	Zhang Shichuan	
The Way of the Rich	富人的生活	富人的生活	12 May 1929	Cheng Bugao	
Yellow Flowers in Blood and Tears 2	血淚黃花後集2	血泪黄花后集2	9 Jun 1929	Zheng Zhengqiu, Cheng Bugao	
Little Hero Liu Jin	小英雄劉進	小英雄刘进	7 Sep 1929	Cheng Bugao	
Beauty Under the Knife	刀下美人	刀下美人	16 Sep 1929	Zheng Zhengqiu	
A New Journey to the West	新西遊記	新西游记	28 Sep 1929	Zhang Shichuan	
Lover's Blood	愛人的血	爱人的血	19 Oct 1929	Cheng Bugao	
A Child on the Battlefield	戰地小同胞	战地小同胞	21 Nov 1929	Zheng Zhengqiu	
Father Loves Mother	爸爸愛媽媽	爸爸爱妈妈	27 Dec 1929	Cheng Bugao	
A New Journey to the West 2	新西遊記2	新西游记2	2 Jan 1930	Zhang Shichuan	
Golden Road	黃金之路	黄金之路	7 Mar 1930	Cheng Bugao	
The Broken Pagoda	碎琴樓	碎琴楼	22 Mar 1930	Zheng Zhengqiu	
A New Journey to the West 3	新西遊記3	新西游记3	6 Apr 1930	Zhang Shichuan, Cheng Bugao	
A Red Egg	一個紅蛋	一个红蛋	5 Jun 1930	Cheng Bugao	
A Romantic Woman	浪漫女子	浪漫女子	6 Sep 1930	Cheng Bugao	
A Wise Mother	倡門賢母	倡门贤母	8 Nov 1930	Cheng Bugao	
Taohua Lake	桃花湖	桃花湖	14 Nov 1930	Zheng Zhengqiu	(Note: In two episodes (Huang 2014, p. 305))
A Warrior Saves a Beauty	勇士救美記	勇士救美记	1 Jan 1931	Tang Jie, Wang Jiting	
The Bandit and the Filial Son	強盜孝子	强盗孝子	1 Jan 1931	Zhang Shichuan	
Three Fathers	三個父親	三个父亲	25 Jan 1931	Tang Jie, Wang Jiting	
An Amorous History of the Silver Screen †	銀幕艷史	银幕艳史	17 Feb 1931	Cheng Bugao	
Three Swords of Love	三箭之愛	三箭之爱	18 Apr 1931	Xu Xinfu	
Join the Army for the Wife	為妻從軍	为妻从军	6 May 1931	Tang Jie, Wang Jiting	
Sea of Hatred	恨海	恨海	30 May 1931	Tan Zhiyuan, Gao Lihen	
Figure on the Window	窗上人影	窗上人影	11 Jun 1931	Cheng Bugao	
The Murderous Lady	殺人的小姐	杀人的小姐	11 Jul 1931	Tan Zhiyuan, Gao Lihen	
Shadow of Red Tears	紅淚影	红泪影	9 Oct 1931	Zheng Zhengqiu	
A Couple in Life and Death	生死夫妻	生死夫妻	27 Oct 1931	Zhang Shichuan	
A Shanghai Lady	一個上海小姐	一个上海小姐	20 Nov 1931	Cheng Bugao	
Farewell to a Beauty	玉人永别	玉人永别	26 Nov 1931	Zheng Zhengqiu	
Unlucky to Be Born a Woman	不幸生為女兒身	不幸生为女儿身	17 Dec 1931	Cheng Bugao	
Iron Youth	鐵血青年	铁血青年	31 Dec 1931	Zhang Shichuan	
A Lonely Bird in the Sunset	落霞孤鶩	落霞孤鹜	22 Apr 1932	Cheng Bugao	
Lucky Silver Stars	銀星幸運	银星幸运	21 May 1932	Zhang Shichuan	
A Loving Mother	慈母	慈母	6 Jul 1932	Zhang Shichuan	
Love and Death	愛與死	爱与死	13 Aug 1932	Cheng Bugao	
Resurrecting the National Spirit	國魂的復活	国魂的复活	22 Sep 1932	Zhang Shichuan	
Love and Life	戀愛與生命	恋爱与生命	15 Oct 1932	Tang Jie, Wang Jiting	
Lovely Enemy	可愛的仇敵	可爱的仇敌	30 Oct 1932	Cheng Bugao	
Old Grudges and New Sorrows	舊恨新愁	旧恨新愁	8 Dec 1932	Li Pingqian	
Battlefield Adventures	戰地歷險記	战地历险记	14 Jan 1933	Zhang Shichuan	
Wild Torrent	狂流	狂流	5 Mar 1933	Cheng Bugao	
Lute and Resentment in Spring	琵琶春怨	琵琶春怨	16 Mar 1933	Li Pingqian	
The Cries of Women	女性的吶喊	女性的呐喊	13 Apr 1933	Shen Xiling	
The Book of Morality	道德寶鑒	道德宝鉴	2 May 1933	Gao Lihen, Wang Xianzhai	(Note: Also known as A Humane Thief (人道之賊; 人道之贼) (Huang 2014, p. 287))
The Prospect	前程	前程	21 May 1933	Zhang Shichuan, Cheng Bugao	
Waves of Love in Spring	春水情波	春水情波	28 May 1933	Zheng Zhengqiu	
A Modern Woman	現代一女性	现代一女性	16 Jun 1933	Li Pingqian	
The Path of Health and Beauty	健美之路	健美之路	21 Jun 1933	Chen Kengran	
Oppression	壓迫	压迫	16 Aug 1933	Gao Lihen	
Mother and Son	母與子	母与子	26 Aug 1933	Tang Jie	
My Sister's Tragic Tale	姊姊的悲剧	姊姊的悲剧	15 Sep 1933	Gao Lihen, Wang Jiting	
Late Spring	殘春	残春	1 Oct 1933	Zhang Shichuan	
An Iron Plate and Red Tears	鐵板紅淚錄	铁板红泪录	12 Nov 1933	Hong Shen	
Cigarette Beauty	香草美人	香草美人	26 Nov 1933	Chen Kengran	
The Uprising	鹽潮	盐潮	5 Jan 1934	Xu Xinfu	
Exhibition	展覽會	展览会	21 Jan 1934	Chen Kengran	
A Feather on Mount Tai	泰山鴻毛	泰山鸿毛	14 Feb 1934	Zhang Shichuan	
Romance on Mount Hua	華山豔史	华山艳史	14 Apr 1934	Cheng Bugao	
A Shared Foe	同仇	同仇	27 Apr 1934	Cheng Bugao	
Children of the Times	時代的兒女	时代的儿女	22 Apr 1934	Li Pingqian	
Valley of Gold	黃金谷	黄金谷	3 Jun 1934	Li Pingqian	(Note: Also known as Year of the Harvest (豐年; 丰年) (Huang 2014, p. 285))
The Enemies of Women †	女性的仇敵	女性的仇敌	10 Jun 1934	Chen Kengran	
Three Sisters	三姊妹	三姊妹	16 Jun 1934	Li Pingqian	
Willows and Wallflowers	路柳牆花	路柳墙花	15 Sep 1934	Xu Xinfu	
Go Northwest	到西北去	到西北去	1 Oct 1934	Cheng Bugao	
The Way of Women	婦道	妇道	11 Nov 1934	Chen Kengran	
Youth Line	青春線	青春线	12 Dec 1934	Yao Sufeng	
24 Hours in Shanghai	上海二十四小時	上海二十四小时	15 Dec 1934	Shen Xiling	
Bigamy	重婚	重婚	20 Dec 1934	Wu Cun	
Heart of a Beauty	美人心	美人心	21 Mar 1935	Xu Xinfu	
Human Being	人倫	人伦	14 Apr 1935	Li Pingqian	(Note: Also known as Homeless (無家可歸; 无家可归) (Huang 2014, p. 301))
Season of Falling Flowers	落花時節	落花时节	27 Apr 1935	Wu Cun	

=== Sound films ===
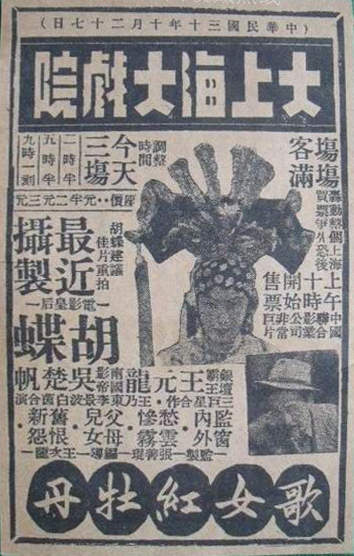
Advertisement for Sing-Song Girl Red Peony (1931)

Key
†	Indicates film is extant

The sound films of Mingxing
English title	Traditional Chinese	Simplified Chinese	Première	Director	Ref(s)
Sing-Song Girl Red Peony	歌女紅牡丹	歌女红牡丹	15 Mar 1931	Zhang Shichuan	
This Is Paradise	如此天堂	如此天堂	10 Sep 1931	Zhang Shichuan	(Note: In two episodes (Huang 2014, p. 301))
Who Is the Hero	誰是英雄	谁是英雄	23 Jan 1932	Xu Xinfu	
Old Beijing	舊時京華	旧时京华	12 May 1932	Zhang Shichuan	
Fate in Tears and Laughter †	啼笑因緣	啼笑因缘	26 Jun 1932	Zhang Shichuan	
Flowers of Freedom	自由之花	自由之花	22 Dec 1932	Zheng Zhengqiu	
Lovelorn	失戀	失恋	21 Feb 1933	Zhang Shichuan	
The Cosmetics Store †	脂粉市場	脂粉市场	14 May 1933	Zhang Shichuan	
Azolla	滿江紅	满江红	14 Sep 1933	Cheng Bugao	
Spring Silkworms †	春蠶	春蚕	8 Oct 1933	Cheng Bugao	
Twin Sisters †	姊妹花	姊妹花	14 Feb 1934	Zheng Zhengqiu	
The Classic for Girls †	女兒經	女儿经	9 Oct 1934	Cheng Bugao, Zhang Shichuan, Shen Xiling, Yao Sufeng, Zheng Zhengqiu, Xu Xinfu, Li Pingqian, Chen Kengran, Wu Cun	
Two Against One †	二對一	二对一	18 Oct 1934	Zhang Shichuan	
Madame Mai †	麥夫人	麦夫人	28 Nov 1934	Zhang Shichuan	
Flowers Reborn	再生花	再生花	25 Dec 1934	Zheng Zhengqiu	
Lonely Orchid †	空谷蘭	空谷兰	3 Feb 1935	Zhang Shichuan	
Passionate and Loyal Soul †	熱血忠魂	热血忠魂	5 Jun 1935	Zhang Shichuan, Xu Xinfu, Zheng Zhengqiu, Wu Cun, Cheng Bugao, Shen Xiling, Li Pingqian	
Homesick †	鄉愁	乡愁	19 Jun 1935	Shen Xiling	
The Extended Family	張石川	張石川	5 Sep 1935	Zhang Shichuan	
Tuberose	夜來香	夜来香	3 Oct 1935	Cheng Bugao	
The Jade Horse	翡翠馬	翡翠马	8 Nov 1935	Xu Xinfu	
The Boatman's Daughter †	船家女	船家女	29 Nov 1935	Shen Xiling	
Peach Blossoms after Misfortune	劫後桃花	劫后桃花	23 Jan 1936	Zhang Shichuan	
Brother's Tour †	兄弟行	兄弟行	10 Jan 1936	Cheng Bugao	
Spring Flowers	春之花	春之花	19 Mar 1936	Wu Cun	
The Battle Between Peach and Plum	桃李爭艷	桃李争艳	16 Apr 1936	Li Pingqian	
Old and New Shanghai †	新舊上海	新旧上海	1 May 1936	Cheng Bugao	
Diamond	金剛鑽	金刚钻	20 Jun 1936	Xu Xinfu	
Red Begonia	海棠紅	海棠红	5 Sep 1936	Zhang Shichuan	
Women's Rights	女權	女权	23 Sep 1936	Zhang Shichuan	
Little Lingzi	小玲子	小玲子	21 Oct 1936	Cheng Bugao	
City of Night	夜會	夜会	6 Nov 1936	Li Pingqian	
Unyielding in Life and Death †	生死同心	生死同心	29 Nov 1936	Ying Yunwei	
The Qingming Festival	清明時節	清明时节	22 Dec 1936	Ouyang Yuqian	
Forever Smiling	永遠的微笑	永远的微笑	15 Jan 1937	Wu Cun	
Money for the New Year †	壓歲錢	压岁钱	10 Feb 1937	Zhang Shichuan	
Crossroads †	十字街頭	十字街头	15 Apr 1937	Shen Xiling	
Dragon and Tiger	生龍活虎	生龙活虎	14 May 1937	Xu Xinfu	
The Flower of Society †	社會之花	社会之花	10 Jun 1937	Zhang Shichuan	(Note: Also known as Black Whirlwind (黑旋風; 黑旋风) (Huang 2014, p. 303))
Dream World †	夢裡乾坤	梦里乾坤	3 Jul 1937	Cheng Bugao	
Street Angel †	馬路天使	马路天使	24 Jul 1937	Yuan Muzhi	
The Strange Case of the Old Pagoda	古塔奇案	古塔奇案	12 Feb 1938	Zhang Shichuan	
Four Daughters	四千金	四千金	10 Mar 1938	Wu Cun	
Night Escape	夜奔	夜奔	27 Apr 1938	Cheng Bugao	
Night of Horrors	恐怖之夜	恐怖之夜	1 Jun 1938	Wu Cun	
A Mother's Secret	母親的秘密	母亲的秘密	14 Jul 1938	Zhang Shichuan	

== Works cited ==
- Huang, Xuelei (2014). Shanghai Filmmaking: Crossing Borders, Connecting to the Globe, 1922–1938. Leiden: Brill. ISBN 978-90-04-27933-9.
- Jia, Binwu (2022). "Zheng Zhegu and Performances in Early Chinese Film". Journal of Chinese Film Studies. 2 (2): 261–276. doi:10.1515/jcfs-2022-0002.
- Jiang Zhen (姜贞) (2009). 周剑云:中国电影业的儒商 [Zhou Jianyun: A Confucian Businessman in China's Film Industry]. Film and Art (in Chinese): 139–145.
- Jin Qi'an (金其安) (2009). 中国早期电影事业的开拓者周剑云 [Zhou Jianyun, The Pioneer of China's Early Film Industry]. Jianghuai Literature and History (in Chinese) (2): 133–141.
- Rea, Christopher (2021). Chinese Film Classics, 1922–1949. New York: Columbia University Press. ISBN 978-0-231-18813-5.
- Xiao, Zhiwei (1998). "Chinese Cinema". In Zhang, Yingjin; Xiao, Zhiwei (eds.). Encyclopedia of Chinese Film. New York, London: Routledge. pp. 3–30. ISBN 978-0-415-15168-9.
- Yang, Jeff (2003). Once Upon a Time in China: A Guide to Hong Kong, Taiwanese, and Mainland Chinese Cinema. New York: Simon and Schuster. ISBN 978-0-7434-4817-8.
- Zhang, Zhen (2005). An Amorous History of the Silver Screen: Shanghai Cinema, 1896–1937. Chicago: University of Chicago Press. ISBN 978-0-226-98238-0.
- Zhang Wei (張偉) (2009). 談影小集——中國現代影壇的塵封一隅 [A Collection of Shorts about Movies—A Dusty Corner of China's Modern Film World] (in Chinese). Taipei: Showway Publishing. ISBN 978-986-221-308-7.
