= Zheng Zhengqiu =

Chinese film producer (1889–1935)

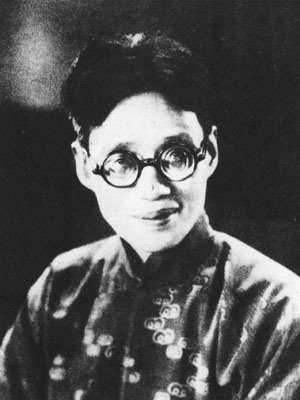
- Born: January 25, 1889; Shanghai, China
- Died: July 16, 1935 (aged 46); Shanghai, China
- Occupations: Film director, Screenwriter, Producer

Chinese name
- Traditional Chinese: 鄭正秋
- Simplified Chinese: 郑正秋
Transcriptions

Zheng Zhengqiu (Chinese: 鄭正秋; January 25, 1889 – July 16, 1935) was a Chinese filmmaker often considered a "founding father" of Chinese cinema.

== Biography ==
Born in Shanghai in 1889, Zheng Zhengqiu was a young intellectual involved in China's theater scene when he and his friend and colleague, Zhang Shichuan, made the first Chinese feature film, a short film titled, The Difficult Couple in 1913. The two men would come together again in 1922 with the founding of the seminal Mingxing Film Company and the oldest surviving classic Laborer's Love, which would dominate Shanghai's film industry for the next fifteen years.

While with Mingxing, Zheng served not only as screenwriter and director, but as a studio manager and producer, personally writing and directing 53 films before his early death in 1935. Like many of his colleagues during the period, Zheng was devoted to leftist causes and social justice, themes that were evident in many of his works.

After his partner, Zhang Shichuan, rescued Xuan Jinglin from a brothel, Zheng Zhengqiu devised her stage name. He based it on the name she had adopted in the brothel and a transliteration of Lillian Gish into Chinese said in a Shanghai accent.

== Partial directorial filmography ==
Year	English Title	Chinese Title	Notes
1913	The Difficult Couple	難夫難妻	Co-directed with Zhang Shichuan
1927	The Tablet of Blood and Tears	血淚碑	
1928	The Heroine in Black	黑衣女俠	Co-directed with Cheng Bugao
1928	The White Cloud Pagada	白雲塔	Co-directed with Zhang Shichuan
1929	The Lady's Lover	俠女救夫人	
1934	Twin Sisters	姊妹花	
1934	The Classic for Girls	女兒經	Co-directed with Zhang Shichuan, Yao Sufeng, Cheng Bugao, Xu Xinfu, Li Pingqian, Chen Kengran, and Shen Xiling
1935	Ardent, Loyal Souls	熱血忠魂	Co-directed with Zhang Shichuan, Wu Cun, Cheng Bugao, Xu Xinfu, Li Pingqian, and Shen Xiling
