= Xu Xinfu =

Chinese film director (1897–1965)

- 徐欣夫
- Born: 1897; Jiangyin, Qing China
- Died: 8 May 1965 (aged 67–68); British Hong Kong
- Occupation(s): Filmmaker, producer
- Spouse: Gu Meijun

Chinese name
- Chinese: 徐欣夫
Transcriptions
Standard Mandarin
- Hanyu Pinyin: Xú Xīnfū
- Wade–Giles: Hsü^{2} Hsin^{1}fu^{1}

Xu Xinfu (Chinese: 徐欣夫; pinyin: Xú Xīnfū; 1897 – 8 May 1965) was a Chinese director and producer. Born in Jiangyin, Jiangsu, he moved to Shanghai for schooling. In 1921, he became involved in the production of Yan Ruisheng, considered the first feature-length film in mainland China. Over subsequent decades, he was involved with numerous films with Shanghai-based companies, mostly Mingxing. Towards the end of the Chinese Civil War, he travelled to Taiwan on a filmmaking project; when his backer pulled funding, he sold his own property to fund the production of Storms on Ali Mountain (1950). Xu remained active in Taiwan through the 1950s, with his film Women in the Army submitted to the 1954 Southeast Asian Film Festival.

== Biography ==
=== Early career ===
Xu was born in Jiangyin, Jiangsu, in 1897. He attended school at the Collège Saint Ignace in Xujiahui, graduating in 1920. With Gu Kenfu and Lu Jie he established a film studies group. In 1921, Xu was involved in the production of Ren Pengnian's film Yan Ruisheng. Working with Gu Kenfu and Chen Shouzhi, he adapted the notorious murder case into what has been identified as the first feature-length film produced in mainland China. He subsequently joined the Great China Film Company, with whom he co-directed Battle Exploits (1925) alongside Lu Jie.

Xu joined the Shanghai-based film company Mingxing in 1931. With them, he directed several films, including Three Arrows of Love (1931), Who is the Hero? (1931), Blood Debt (1932), The Uprising (1933), The Classic for Girls (1934), and Passionate and Loyal Soul (1935). The Uprising sympathetically depicted salt miners rebelling against the capitalist business owners, while The Classic for Girls was an omnibus that also featured the work of Cheng Bugao, Shen Xiling, Zhang Shichuan, and Zheng Zhengqiu. While with Mingxing, Xu married the actress Gu Meijun, whom he had directed in The Uprising; the couple also advocated for Gu's sister, Lanjun, to be given acting roles.

After 1938, Xu worked with several production houses in Shanghai, including Xinhua, Zhonghua, and Cathay. Films directed during this period included Gunshots in a Rainy Evening (1941), and Shadows in an Ancient House (1948), as well as The Pearl Tunic (1938), Butterfly Love Flower (1938), and Clairvoyance (1942). In the late 1940s, he directed two films that offered sexualized thrills: Pink Bomb (1947) and Beauty's Blood (1948); he also adapted the American Charlie Chan stories for Chinese audiences, with Xu Xinyuan as the titular character. In 1945, Xu was one of forty-three filmmakers and stars involved in a fundraiser for constructing housing for military families.

=== Move to Taiwan ===
Xu later moved to Taiwan, where he established the Wanxiang Film Company in 1948. He produced Storms on Ali Mountain in 1949, the first Mandarin-language film made in Taiwan. Directed by Chang Cheh, the film was initially intended to be produced by Cathay Pictures. However, the company pulled funding after the crew had been in Taiwan for a month. Believing that Cathay had been taken over by the Chinese Communist Party (CCP) amidst the Chinese Civil War, Xu sold his own property to raise funds and continued production. Storms on Ali Mountain was a commercial success, later receiving screenings for Taiwanese President Chiang Kai-shek as well as the Chinese diaspora in New York.

Subsequent films directed by Xu included Never to Part (1951) and Women in the Army (1952). The former film was a piece of propaganda, depicting tensions between the Kuomintang government and the Taiwanese indigenous peoples as stemming from CCP manipulations, while the latter – co-directed with Wang Yu – was submitted to the inaugural Southeast Asian Film Festival in Tokyo in 1954. In the 1950s, Xu took several office roles. He was the director of the Agricultural Education Film Company's Taichung office, remaining in that role after the corporation was merged with the Taiwan Film Company to form the Central Motion Picture Corporation. He also took several consulting roles. Films he completed later in the 1950s included Sun Moon Lake and Sword of the Lone Star in the Cold Night (both 1956). Xu died in Hong Kong on 8 May 1965.

== Analysis ==
Writing for the Encyclopaedia of China, Sun Chengjian describes Xu as pioneering the detective genre in Shanghai cinema. Plot elements such as gangsters, police, and spies were used to cultivate a sense of suspense, something that was emulated by Xu's peers.

== Partial filmography ==
- Yan Ruisheng (阎瑞生, 1921)
- Battle Exploits (战功, 1925)
- Three Swords of Love (三剑之爱, 1931)
- Who is the Hero? (谁是英雄, 1931)
- Blood Debt (血债, 1932)
- The Uprising (鹽潮, 1933)
- The Classic for Girls (女儿经, 1934)
- Passionate and Loyal Soul (热血忠魂, 1935)
- The Disappearing Corpse (1937)
- The Pearl Tunic (珍珠衫, 1938)
- Butterfly Love Flower (蝶恋花, 1938)
- The Radio Station Murders (播音台大血案, 1939)
- Charlie Chan Smashes an Evil Plot (陳查禮大破隱身術, 1941)
- Gunshots in a Rainy Evening (雨夜枪声, 1941)
- Clairvoyance (千里眼, 1942)
- Pink Bomb (粉红色的炸弹, 1947)
- Shadows in an Ancient House (古屋魔影, 1948)
- Beauty's Blood (美人血, 1948)
- Charlie Chan Matches Wits With the Prince of Darkness (1948)
- Storms on Ali Mountain (阿里山風雲, 1950)
- Never to Part (永不分離, 1951)
- Women in the Army (军中芳草, 1952)
- Sun Moon Lake (日月潭, 1956)
- Sword of the Lone Star in the Cold Night (寒夜孤星剑, 1956)

== Works cited ==
- "Charlie Chan in China". The Chinese Mirror: A Journal of Chinese Film History. May 2008. Archived from the original on 8 July 2011.
- Lee, Daw-Ming (2012). Historical Dictionary of Taiwan Cinema. Lanham, Maryland: Scarecrow Press. ISBN 978-0-8108-7922-5.
- Lee, Sangjoon (2020). Cinema and the Cultural Cold War: US Diplomacy and the Origins of the Asian Cinema Network. The United States in the World. Ithaca, New York: Cornell University Press. doi:10.1515/9781501752322-006. ISBN 978-1-5017-5232-2.
- Li Wenhui (李文輝) (16 February 2015). 莫忘來時路／2月16日 台65年首部國語電影 [Don't Forget Whence You Came/February 16, Taiwan's First Mandarin Film in 65 years]. China Times (in Chinese). Archived from the original on 21 October 2024.
- 籌建軍眷住宅港台影星大公演 [Preparing for the Construction of Residences for Military Dependents and a Grand Performance of Hong Kong and Taiwan Movie Stars] (in Chinese). Taiwan Film and Audio-Visual Institute. Archived from the original on 21 October 2024.
- Sun Chengjian (孙承健) (30 August 2023). 徐欣夫 [Xu Xinfu]. Encyclopaedia of China (in Chinese) (3rd ed.). Archived from the original on 21 October 2024.
- Wang Hanhua (王邗华), Liang Licheng (梁立成), and Yuan Tingyu (1996). 中国早期电影导演与公司研究 [Celebrity Romances in the Republic of China] (in Chinese). Jiangsu: Jiangsu Ancient Books Publishing House.
- Xiao, Zhiwei (1998). "Chinese Cinema". In Zhang, Yingjin; Xiao, Zhiwei (eds.). Encyclopedia of Chinese Film. New York, London: Routledge. pp. 3–30. ISBN 978-0-415-15168-9.
- Zhang, Yingjin (1998). "Propaganda and Film". In Zhang, Yingjin; Xiao, Zhiwei (eds.). Encyclopedia of Chinese Film. New York, London: Routledge. pp. 267–268. ISBN 978-0-415-15168-9.
- Zhang, Yingjin (1998). "Xia Yan". In Zhang, Yingjin; Xiao, Zhiwei (eds.). Encyclopedia of Chinese Film. New York, London: Routledge. p. 378. ISBN 978-0-415-15168-9.
