= Mingxing =

Former Chinese film production company

Mingxing Film Company
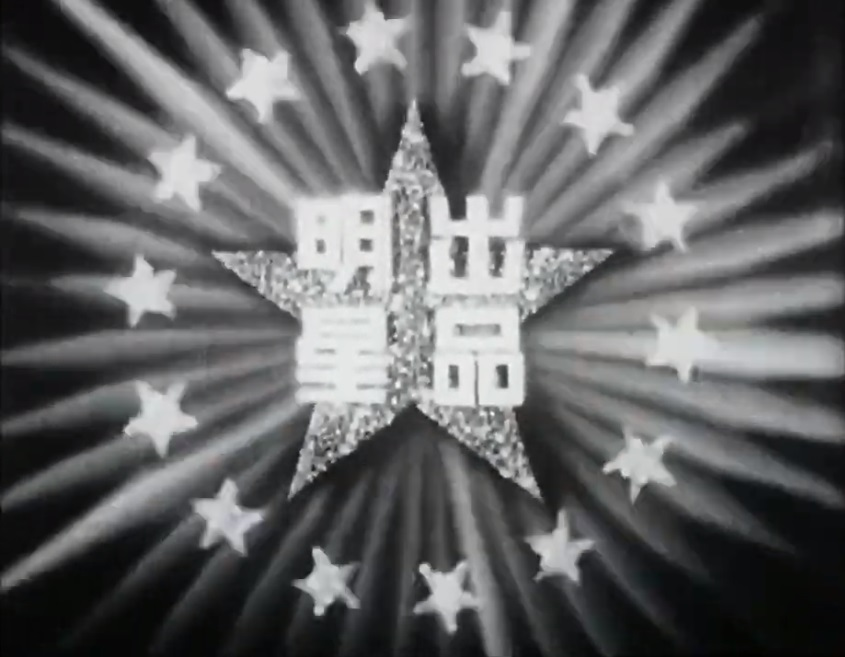
- Production logo, 1937
- Native name
- Chinese: 明星影片公司
Transcriptions
Standard Mandarin
- Hanyu Pinyin: Míngxīng Yǐngpiàn Gōngsī
- Wade–Giles: Ming^{2}hsing^{1} Ying^{3}p`ien^{4} Kung^{1}ssu^{1}
- Type: Private limited company
- Industry: Film
- Founded: February 1922; 104 years ago in Shanghai, Republic of China
- Founders: Ren Jinping; Zhang Shichuan; Zheng Zhegu; Zheng Zhengqiu; Zhou Jianyun
- Defunct: late 1937
- Fate: Closed during the Japanese occupation of Shanghai
- Headquarters: Shanghai, Republic of China

The Mingxing Film Company (Chinese: 明星影片公司; pinyin: Míngxīng Yǐngpiàn Gōngsī), also credited as the Star Motion Picture Production Company, was a production company active in the Republic of China between 1922 and 1937. Established by a consortium of creative professionals, including film director Zhang Shichuan, dramatist Zheng Zhengqiu, and critic Zhou Jianyun, Mingxing initially produced comedy films that drew little audience attention. Facing insolvency in 1923, the company used the last of its capital to produce Orphan Rescues Grandfather, which released to massive commercial success and provided the company with the revenue needed to expand and hire new talent.

In the mid-1920s, Mingxing acquired new studios and made its initial public offering, growing rapidly even in the face of emerging competition. It adapted several novels to film, with its Lonely Orchid (1926) being one of the most successful Chinese films of the silent era. It also expanded from family dramas to wuxia with The Burning of the Red Lotus Temple (1928), and began producing sound films with Sing-Song Girl Red Peony (1931). By the early 1930s, Mingxing was one of the largest film companies in Shanghai, together with the Tianyi Film Company and the United Photoplay Service.

Between the ongoing Sino-Japanese War – including damage caused by the 1932 incursion into Shanghai – and a series of financial setbacks, Mingxing faced significant financial losses through the 1930s. Despite the success of films such as Twin Sisters (1934) and efforts to attract new writers, the company was unable to recover and operations ended after the Japanese occupied Shanghai in 1937. During its lifetime, Mingxing produced 174 fiction films, as well as newsreels, cartoons, and actualities.

== Background ==
Film had been introduced to China in 1896, beginning with one-reelers and later expanding to feature-length productions. In 1905, Fengtai Photographic Studio produced Dingjun Mountain, a short film depicting a performance by the Peking opera singer Tan Xinpei; this is considered the first Chinese-produced film. Zhang Shichuan worked with the American Benjamin Brodsky to establish the Asia Film Company, producing several documentaries as well as The Difficult Couple (1913) – the first Chinese-made short fiction film. The production of shorts increased toward the late 1910s, and audience interest in this new medium – known under such terms as "electric shadowplay" (電光影戯; 电光影戏) – grew. Following the release and success of Yan Ruisheng (1921), a full-length crime drama, several companies were established in Shanghai to capitalize on the new medium.

All of Mingxing's founders were involved in the cultural arena prior to their involvement with the company. Zhang Shichuan had recruited Zheng Zhengqiu, a noted dramatist, to write The Difficult Couple, and maintained a strong relationship with him through the 1910s. Both men also worked with Zheng Zhegu and Zhou Jianyun in the late 1910s to operate the Xinmin Library, a publisher responsible for periodicals such as the Yaofeng Monthly (藥風月刊; 药风月刊) and the Emancipation Pictorial. Zhou Jianyun wrote extensive works of drama criticism, publishing a volume on drama theory in 1918. He and Zheng Zhegu were also prominent members of the Eternal Memory Society, a Peking opera fan club, together with Ren Jinping.

== History ==
=== Establishment and fundraising ===
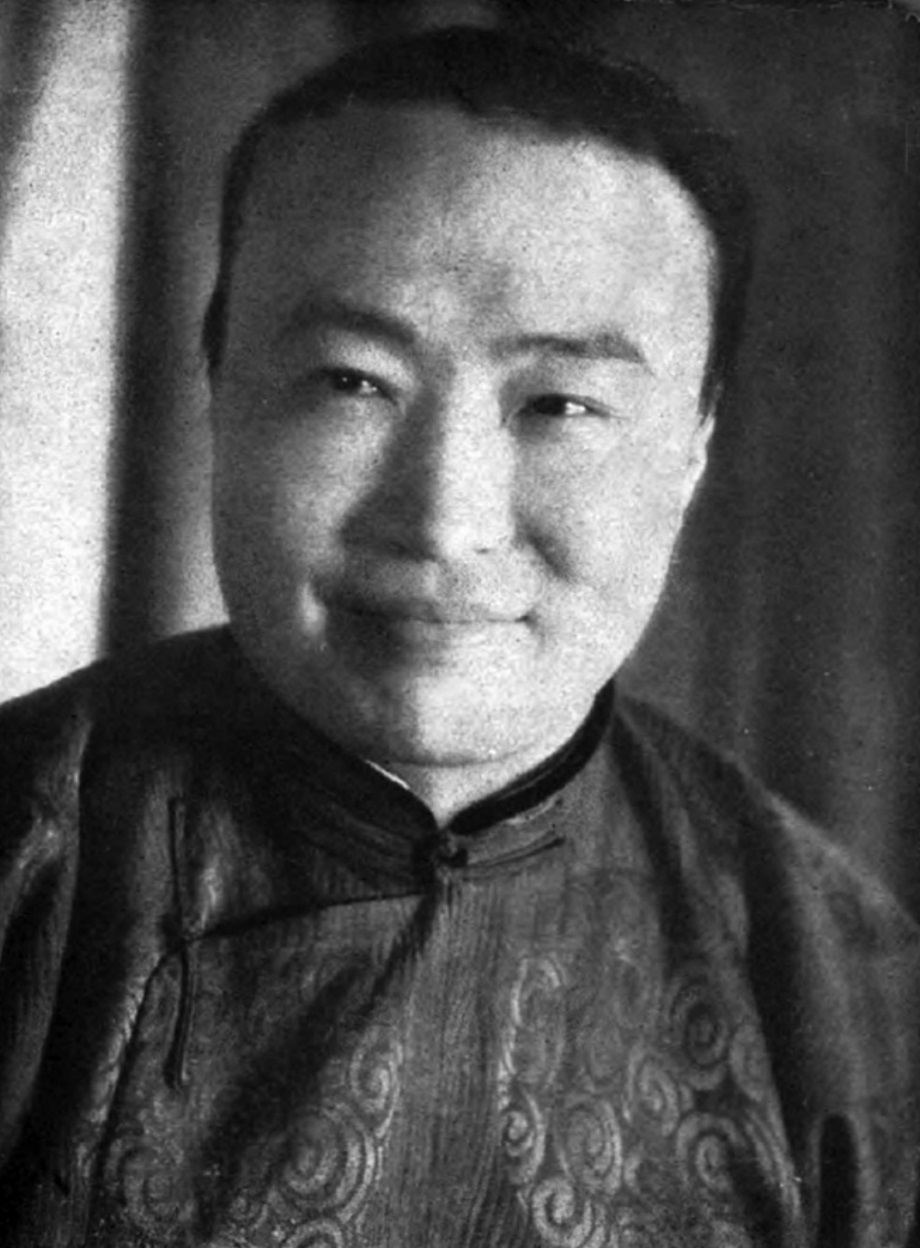
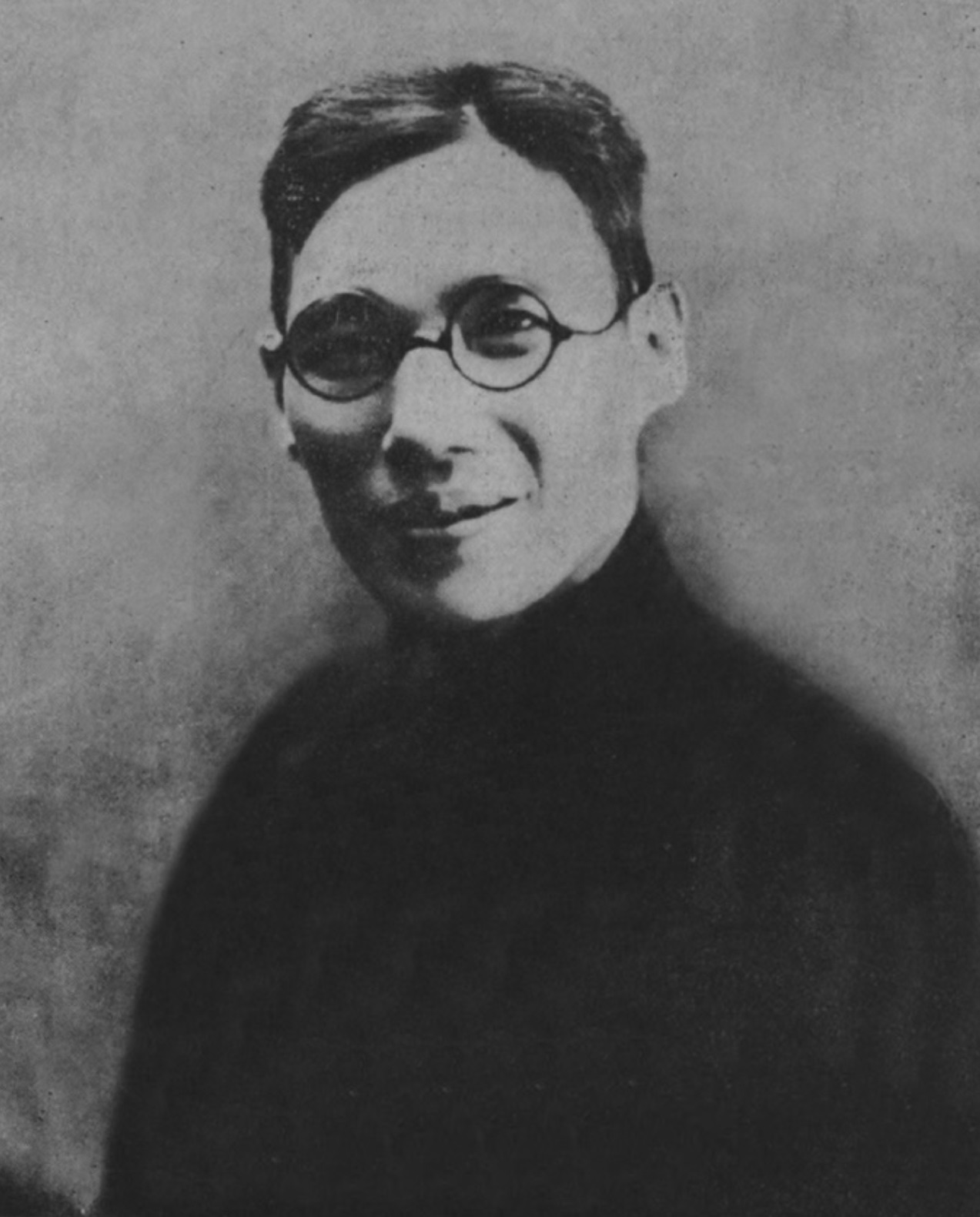
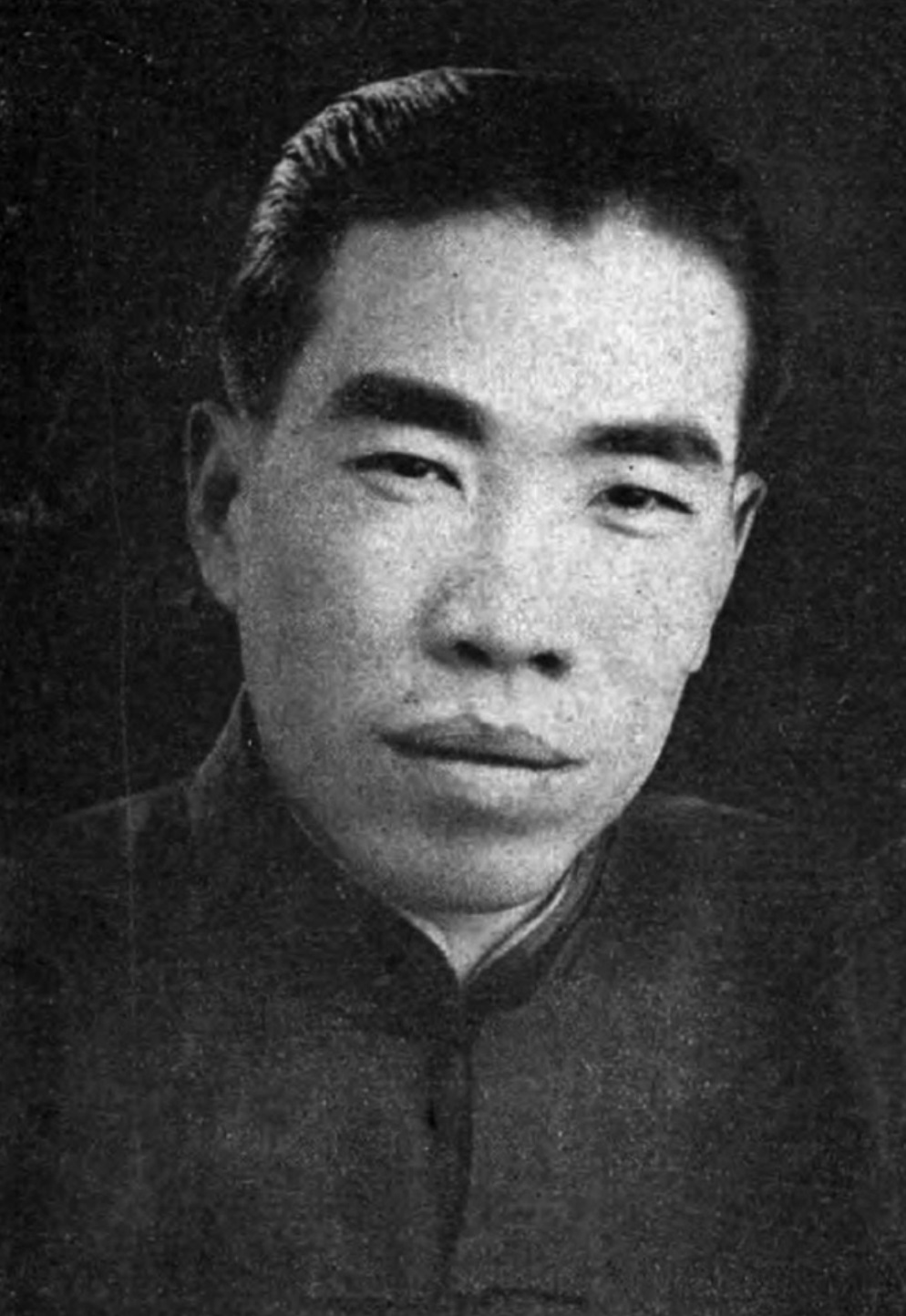
Zhang Shichuan, Zheng Zhengqiu, and Zhou Jianyun; these founders of Mingxing were with the company from its establishment through its final years.

In late 1921, amidst a booming stock market, Zhang Shichuan established the Mutual Stock and Produce Exchange Company together with several of his earlier compatriots. When the bubble burst, the men decided to invest their money in a less risky venture: a motion picture company. In February 1922, the former stock exchange's offices on Guizhou Road in Shanghai were converted into the headquarters of the newly established Mingxing Film Company. Zhang Shichuan took the role of deputy manager, with Ding Boxiong the office head; other roles were taken by Ren Jinping, Zheng Zhegu, Zheng Zhengqiu, and Zhou Jianyun.

Early advertising material announced that Mingxing required 100,000 yuan in venture capital, with each of five founding members contributing 10,000 yuan and the remainder achieved through the sale of 20,000 shares at 5 yuan apiece. (Note: This is equivalent to ¥10,520,000 in venture capital, with five initial contributors each providing ¥1,052,000 and 20,000 shares at ¥526 apiece, in 2019.) Further fundraising was attempted through overtures to local journalists, including a gala dinner, as well as the commission of a special issue of the Motion Picture Review. Interest in the company was also created through an acting school, the Mingxing Shadowplay School headed by Zheng Zhengqiu, that promised insight into various elements of the filmmaking process.

These overtures, however, were unsuccessful. Investors were not enticed by Mingxing's promises, and generally were disdainful of the entertainment industry. The acting school admitted 87 students, of which 17 were women, but only 34 graduated. Further exacerbating the situation, Ding Boxiong and several members of the preparatory team left the company after several months. Ultimately, the company was left with five founders and 10,000 yuan in venture capital, though it claimed to have earned more. (Note: This is equivalent to ¥1,052,000 in starting capital in 2019. Huang (2014, p. 33) notes that Mingxing publications variously claimed to have had 40,000 and 50,000 yuan in startup capital; the 10,000 yuan figure, meanwhile, was remembered after the fact by Zhang Shichuan's wife.)

=== Early years ===
Mingxing shot its first work – a newsreel documenting the arrival of French general Joseph Joffre in Shanghai – on 8 March 1923, with screening handled by a local YMCA branch in April. At the same time, it sought to produce fiction films. In these early works, Zhang Shichuan took the role of director and Zheng Zhengqiu as screenwriter. Studios were rented from an Italian merchant named Enrico Lauro, with filming and development equipment loaned from a British man. Acting was handled by Zheng Zhegu and Zheng Zhengqiu, as well as graduates of Mingxing's acting school.

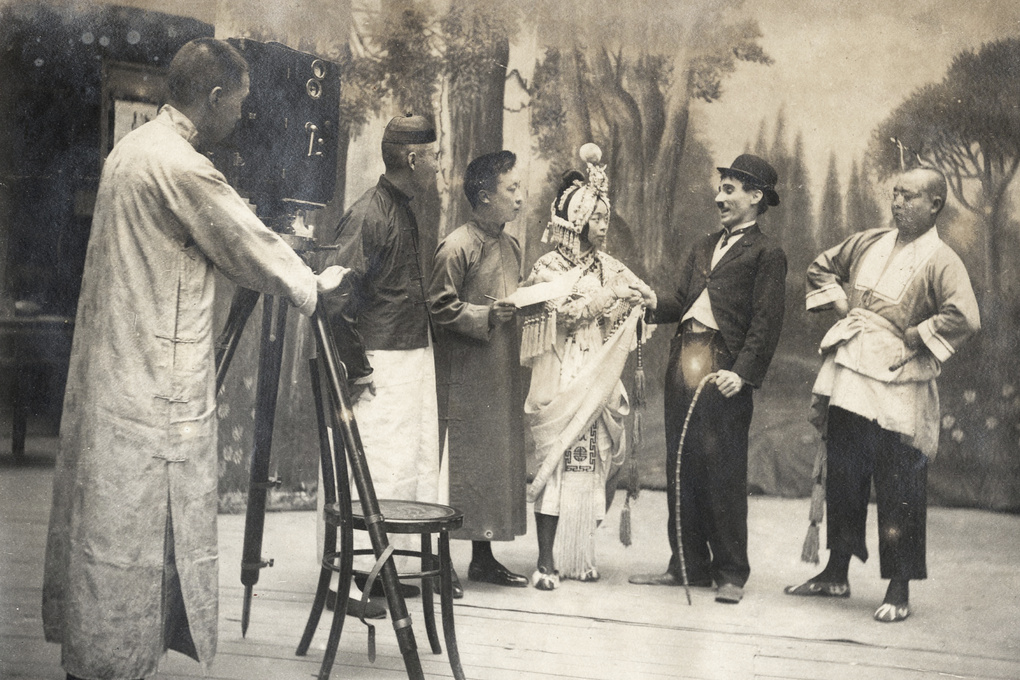
Filming of The King of Comedy Visits Shanghai (1922)

The first two fiction films produced by Mingxing, The King of Comedy Visits Shanghai and Labourer's Love, were produced in mid-to-late 1922. These short slapstick comedies, one following a visit by Charlie Chaplin and the other telling of a hapless carpenter in love with a doctor's daughter, were released as a double feature at the Olympic Theatre on 5 October 1922. Neither these nor a subsequent comedy, Havoc in a Bizarre Theatre, were well received by audiences.

With the company losing money, Mingxing changed tacks for its fourth – and, at thirteen reels, first feature-length – film, Zhang Xinsheng. Although the cast and crew were mostly the same as in earlier productions, it was not a comedy. Rather, the film dramatized a real-life murder in which a deeply indebted man had killed his father to access his inheritance. Advertising material emphasized verisimilitude, and viewer Cheng Bugao later recalled that the film had disgusted audiences with its close-up shots of the autopsy and the removal of organs. This new approach was somewhat successful, with initially sluggish ticket sales giving way to large crowds and 6,000 yuan in revenues. (Note: This is equivalent to ¥631,000 in 2019.)

This influx of capital, however, was insufficient to ensure Mingxing's long-term sustainability. Zhang Shichuan turned to a family drama, one that emphasized the importance of education, and began production of Orphan Rescues Grandfather (1923). In addition to Zheng Zhegu and Zheng Zhengqiu's son Xiaoqiu, the film featured Wang Hanlun in her debut role. (Note: Wang Hanlun had been discovered while observing the production of Labourer's Love the previous year. Zhang Shichuan deemed her to embody a modern fashion sense and sensibility (Wei 2017).) Production took eight months, and when funding ran short, Zhou Jianyun pawned his wife's jewellery to complete the production. Making its debut on 21 December 1923, Orphan Rescues Grandfather was an enormous success, running for a hundred days in Shanghai; its distribution rights for southeast Asia were purchased for 8,000 yuan. (Note: This is equivalent to ¥842,000 in 2019.)

=== Initial expansion ===
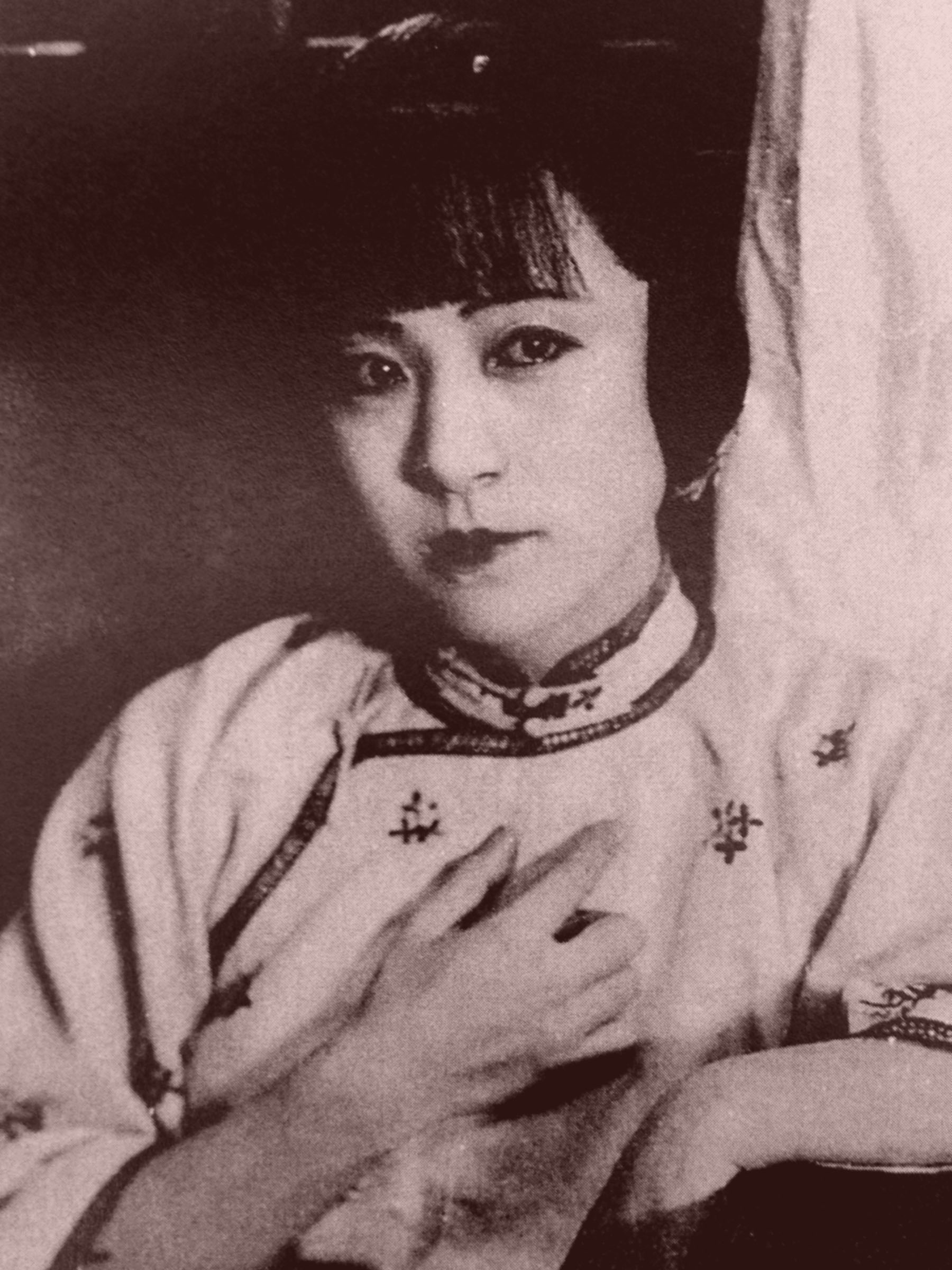
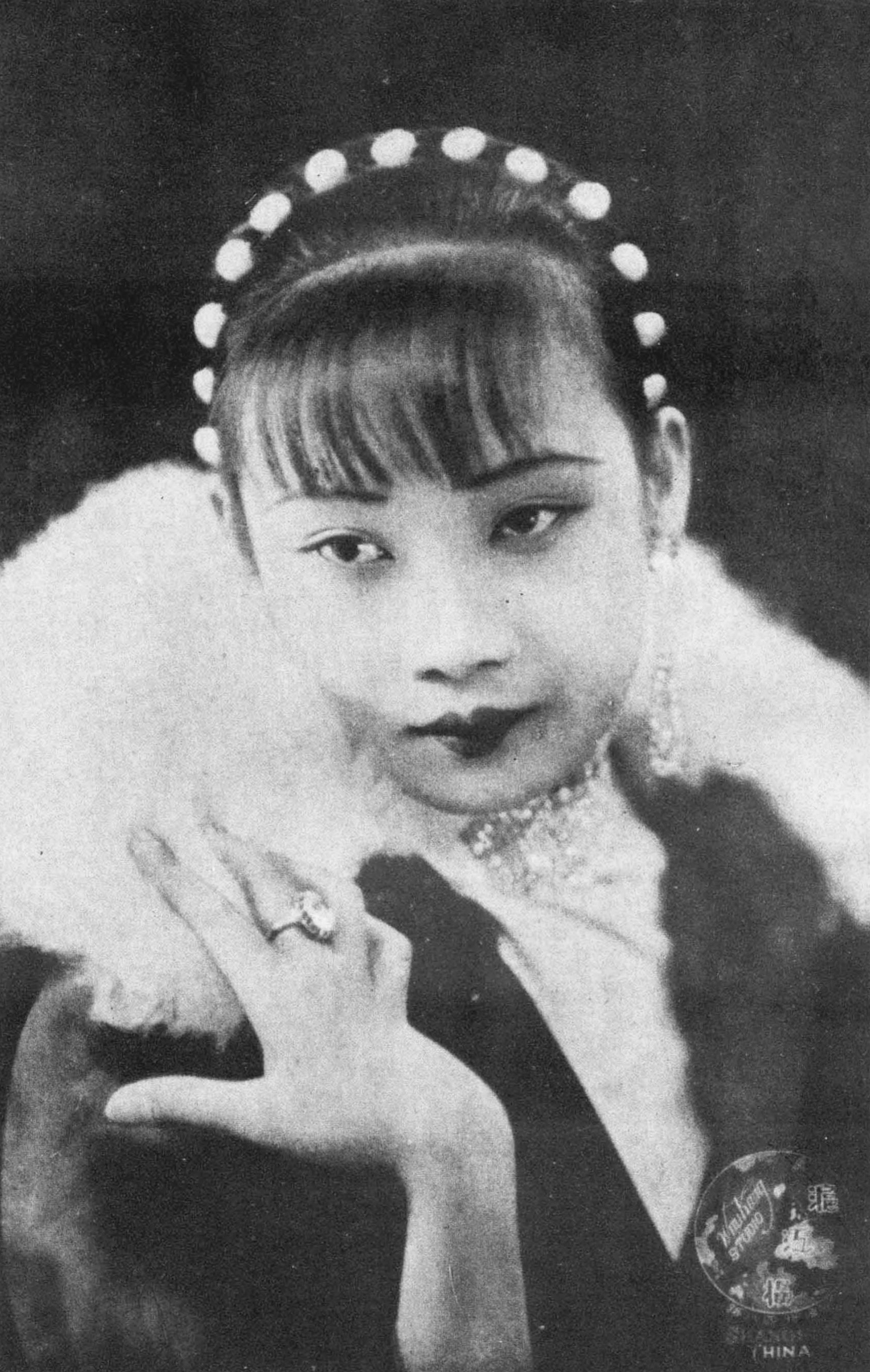
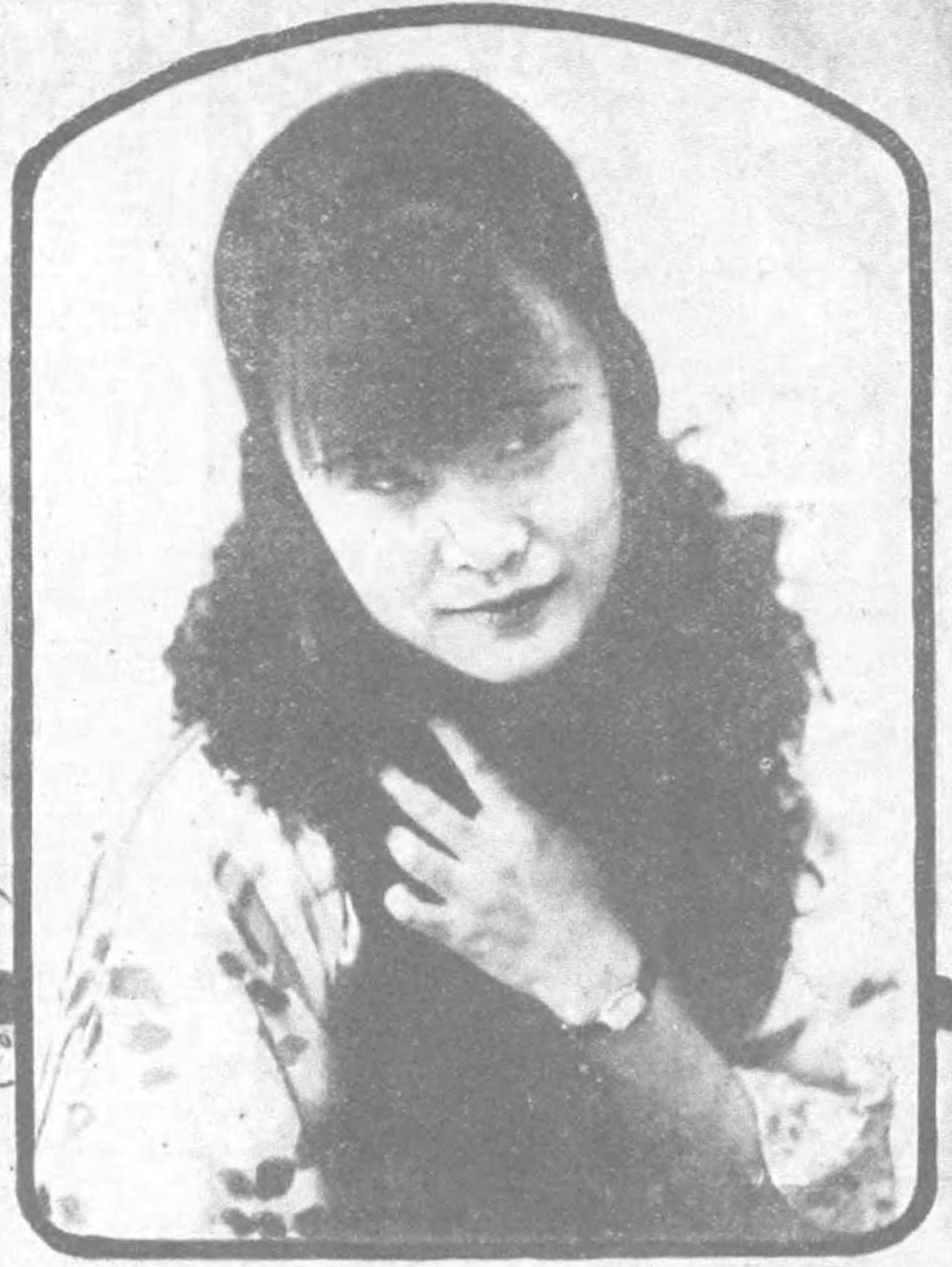
Members of Mingxing's star roster during the 1920s: Wang Hanlun, Hu Die, and Yang Naimei

After Orphan Rescues Grandfather, Mingxing began expanding. Its headquarters moved to the Shanghai French Concession. New crew were hired, including a professional cinematographer and make-up artist, while a surge in interest resulted in the film school accepting numerous students free of charge. Meanwhile, Mingxing acquired new equipment, including foreign-made cameras and printers as well as mercury-vapor and carbon-arc lamps. Seeking to accelerate production, it submitted calls for new actresses, promising wages of between 50 and 300 yuan, (Note: This is equivalent to ¥5,000 to ¥29,000 in 2019.) and hired new directors such as Hong Shen.

Over time, Mingxing also acquired several new properties. It purchased a four-mu (2,668-square-metre, 28,720 sq ft) plot of land on Hart Road in the Shanghai International Settlement. On this plot, it constructed a glass-walled studio – operational as of early 1925 – that allowed for filming regardless of light and weather conditions. To facilitate distribution, Mingxing also purchased the former Shenjiang Stage, a site of Peking opera and civilized drama performances, transforming it into a cinema and opening it to the public on 24 April 1925. This cinema, named the Palace Theatre, was used for first-run showings through 1933; in the late 1920s, another six further cinemas were acquired. Effective May 1925, after the studio made its initial public offering, Mingxing became a private limited company. To attract investors, Ren Jinping drew from his contacts through the Ningbo birthplace association, obtaining funding from prominent merchants such as Fang Jiaobo, Lao Jingxiu, and Yuan Ludeng.

As these expansion efforts were ongoing, Mingxing continued its film production, completing ten films between 1924 and 1925. Several, including Jade Pear Spirit and The Poor Children (both 1924), starred Wang Hanlun, who had risen to stardom with Orphan Rescues Grandfather; she left the company soon after, following a salary dispute. With her departure, Mingxing relied on several actresses, including Xuan Jinglin, Yang Naimei, and Zhang Zhiyun, to draw audiences; mostly, these artists were popular only briefly. Generally, Mingxing's films during this period were melodramas.

=== Trials and tribulations ===
In 1926 backlash against crime films such as Yan Ruisheng and Zhang Xinsheng resulted in the passage of censorship policies by the Ministry of Education; these guidelines, coupled with local censorship bureaus, required more measured approaches to filmmaking. (Note: Such pressures had affected Mingxing's handling of Zhang Xinsheng, with a mid-1923 cut emphasizing the titular criminal's remorse and highlighting the deleterious influence of gambling and narcotics (Huang 2014, p. 156).) Around this time, Mingxing also lost two of its founders; Zheng Zhegu died in 1925, during the filming of The Last Conscience, while Ren Jinping – disappointed with Mingxing's distribution of his debut film A New Family (1925) – left the company in 1926 to establish the Xinren Film Company.

At the same time, Mingxing also began to experience greater competition. Numerous new film companies were established in Shanghai between 1925 and 1926, and although most closed without making any films, several proved viable; for instance, the Tianyi Film Company, founded in 1925 by the brothers Run Run, Runje, Runde, and Runme Shaw, released several successful costume dramas and wuxia (martial arts) films. Although these new companies offered staunch competition, there were also opportunities for partnership; in conjunction with several other studios, in June 1926 Mingxing established the Liuhe Distribution Company to bring Shanghai films to other parts of the Republic of China. (Note: Huang (2014, p. 43) notes that the exact composition of Liuhe appears to have varied over time. At points, it seems to have variously included the Greater China, Huaju, Minxin, Mingxing, Shanghai, Shenzhou, and Youlian film companies.) The partnership collapsed three years later, after which Mingxing established its own distribution company.

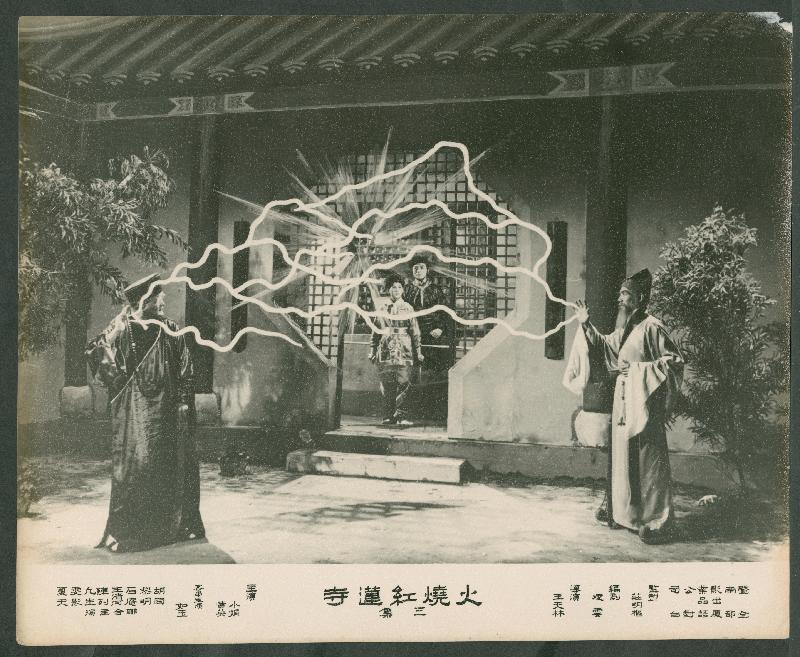
Lobby card for The Burning of the Red Lotus Temple (1928); the film, released in eighteen parts, was a massive success and helped popularize the wuxia genre.

Mingxing initially sought to continue its reliance on family dramas, contracting the celebrated Mandarin Ducks and Butterflies writer Bao Tianxiao at a rate of 100 yuan per month, (Note: This is equivalent to ¥9,620 per month in 2019.) with an expectation that he would produce one screenplay every month. (Note: Bao Tianxiao remained on contract with Mingxing until November 1927 (Huang 2014, p. 95).) In August 1925, he granted the company rights to his novels Lonely Orchid and Fallen Plum Blossoms; the film adaptation of the former, released on 13 February 1926, was one of the most successful Chinese films of the silent era. By the end of 1926, Mingxing had four production units – respectively headed by Zhang Shichuan, Zheng Zhengqiu, Hong Shen, and Bu Wancang – and although efforts to interest further investors failed the company was generally profitable. It operated two studios, and in 1927 occupied new premises on Route Doumer.

Despite such successes, Mingxing also recognized the potential marketability of wuxia films. In 1927, after reading a copy of Xiang Kairan's novel Chronicle of the Strange Roving Knights he found in his son's room, Zhang Shichuan decided to adapt the novel to film. A martial arts drama about four travellers who uncover a conspiracy of evil monks, The Burning of the Red Lotus Temple featured Hu Die – a Tianyi artist recently signed by Mingxing – in her breakthrough role. This film was a major success upon release, and through 1931 Mingxing released another seventeen feature-length continuations. Through the remainder of the decade the company's output continued to increase, from 11 films in 1926 to 16 in 1929. It also enjoyed a roster of 26 stars, half of whom were women.

=== Politics and sound ===
Outside of Shanghai, the political situation in the Republic of China was changing. After more than a decade of warlordism, the Kuomintang (KMT) government and its National Revolutionary Army overthrew the warlords through the Northern Expedition of 1927/1928. These developments were welcomed by Mingxing, and Zhang Shichuan produced newsreels highlighting the festivities and speeches by KMT leader Chiang Kai-shek. Over time, the KMT government in Nanjing developed a series of policies for regulating the film industry; these including mandating the use of Mandarin, banning depictions of supernatural or pornographic material, and curtailing the spread of wuxia materials. At the same time, lacking a national film company, the nationalist government relied on companies such as Mingxing to disseminate information about its efforts; through the late 1920s, the company produced several recordings of government speeches, as well as short documentaries on infrastructure projects. Several KMT members, including Pan Gongzhan and Lin Kanghou, sat on its board of directors.

As these conditions were changing, so too was the landscape of the Chinese film industry. Sound films, imported from the United States, had found popularity with audiences even as many cinemas lacked the technology to properly screen them. Hoping to capitalize on this new technology, Mingxing began production of Sing-Song Girl Red Peony in mid-1931. The technological challenges required larger crews, including language coaches to help actors with their spoken Mandarin, as well as the rental of Pathé's recording studios in Shanghai. The budget soon ballooned to 120,000 yuan, (Note: This is equivalent to ¥9,720,000 in 2019.) six times the cost of an ordinary production, and director Zhang Shichuan took to using opium to alleviate the stress.

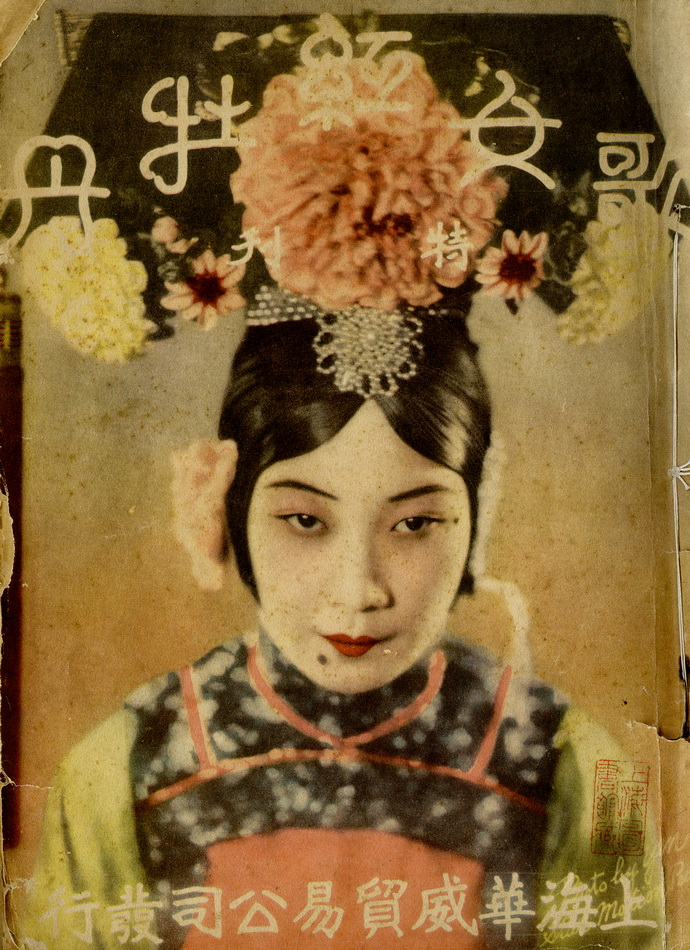
Promotional booklet for Sing-Song Girl Red Peony (1931), Mingxing's first sound film

Sing Song Girl Red Peony was successful, but its sound-on-disc technology was soon eclipsed by the sound-on-film used by Tianyi and another competitor, Huaguang. New technology was purchased at substantial cost – some 200,000 yuan (Note: This is equivalent to ¥16,200,000 in 2019.) – but proved inadequate. As Mingxing continued to produce silent films, it also prepared to adapt Zhang Henshui's novel Fate in Tears and Laughter. After announcing its intent, Mingxing prepared a budget of 1.2 million yuan (Note: This is equivalent to ¥97,000,000 in 2019.) and conducted location shooting in Beijing over the course of two months. The film's 1932 premiere was cut short, however, when Mingxing was accused of copyright violation; a rival, the Dahua Film Company, had pre-emptively registered the copyright for a film adaptation of the novel. Negotiations, which included court arguments as well as protection from the gangsters Huang Jinrong and Du Yuesheng, resulted in Mingxing being allowed to screen its adaptation.

=== Financial floundering and communist cinema ===
Gaining permission to screen Fate in Tears and Laughter cost Mingxing another 100,000 yuan, used for protection money and to reimburse the potential losses incurred by Dahua. (Note: This is equivalent to ¥9,118,000 in 2019.) The film, however, had mediocre critical and commercial returns. Meanwhile, the Japanese incursion into Shanghai had destroyed numerous cinemas and parts of Mingxing's studios, the occupation of Manchuria had reduced available markets, and the ongoing war had created a recession. New film studios, such as the United Photoplay Service (UPS), likewise continued to be established. By the end of 1932, Mingxing was unable to pay staff salaries and had posted massive debts. Creditors were calling, with the American Commercial and Exchange Bank suing the company in late 1933 for failure to repay its loans.

To ameliorate its financial situation, Mingxing boosted production and called for new talent. Taking advantage of a KMT government commission to produce a travel documentary that highlighted the areas along the country's three major railways, which allowed for free accommodation and transportation provisions, Mingxing quickly developed three screenplays in 1933 that would require location shooting in such scenic locations. A group of 40 actors and crew travelled China, ultimately producing the silent films A Feather on Mount Tai, Go Northwest, and Romance on Mount Hua (all 1934). Meanwhile, Zhou Jianyun – through his friend Qian Xingcun – brought in leftist writers such as Xia Yan and Zheng Baiqi; this was intended, in part, to stave off the perception that the studio was unable to produce serious works. Mingxing made more than 40 films in 1933 and 1934, with production of silent films continuing until 1935.

=== Final years and closure ===
Twin Sisters (1934); the success of the film temporarily stabilized Mingxing's finances in the company's final years.

The success of Twin Sisters in 1934, a drama starring Hu Die and Xuan Jinglin that earned 200,000 yuan through domestic and international distribution, improved Mingxing's stability. (Note: This is equivalent to ¥9,356,000 in 2019.) In April 1934, the company reorganized itself, taking a three-tiered structure and establishing its own animation unit under the Wan brothers. (Note: Three Wan brothers – Laiming, Guchan, and Chaochen – were at Mingxing. A fourth, Dihuan, had established his own photography company after experimenting with animation (Giesen 2014, pp. 36, 40).) In 1935, Zhou Jianyun and a group of Mingxing actors spent several months travelling to the United Soviet Socialist Republic, where they attended the inaugural Moscow International Film Festival, and Europe, where Zhou obtained insight into filmmaking.

However, the company's financial difficulties continued. These were compounded by the death of Zheng Zhengqiu in July 1935; the loss of his mediating role brought the personal issues of Mingxing's creative and financial directors, Zhang Shichuan and Zhou Jianyun respectively, to the forefront. Several efforts were made to improve Mingxing's standing. The company moved to new studios in the Maple Grove Bridge area of Chinese Shanghai, which Mingxing occupied in 1936 after a year leasing studios from another company. A hundred people, a third of the company's staff at the time, were fired in August 1935, and a loan of 160,000 yuan was received from the state-run Bank of Communications in June 1936. (Note: This is equivalent to ¥6,702,000 in 2019.) With these funds, a second studio simply known as Studio II was launched in July 1936 with the intent of accelerating production – and providing Zhang Shichuan and Zhou Jianyun with their own domains. Studio II was closed seven months later, having released only four films.

As the Second Sino-Japanese War continued, the Japanese conquered Shanghai in late 1937. Mingxing's film production stopped almost completely, with its premises used as barracks by Japanese troops. Although Zhang Shichuan attempted to stimulate film production, and several of Mingxing's pre-occupation films were premièred in 1938, the company did not survive the occupation. On 13 January 1939, the Mingxing warehouse was destroyed in a fire; its major competitors Tianyi and UPS likewise closed. Zhou Jianyun later moved to Hong Kong, where he established a series of short-lived studios before retiring from film in 1949. Zhang Shichuan, meanwhile, became the director of production at the Japanese-established China United Film Production Company; for this, he was subsequently accused of treason.

== Legacy ==
Labourer's Love (1922), the oldest Chinese film to survive in its entirety

Early film production houses in China were generally smaller affairs, with Yan Ruisheng having been made by a group of students; others were divisions of established enterprises such as the Commercial Press. The film historian Zhang Zhen thus describes Mingxing as "the first full-fledged Chinese film enterprise". By 1933, Mingxing was recognized as one of the largest film studios in Shanghai, together with Tianyi and UPS. The company's Labourer's Love (1922) is considered the oldest Chinese film to survive in its entirety, and its Sing-Song Girl Red Peony (1931) has been called the first sound film in China. (Note: This appellation is not universal. As dialogue and songs were recorded to a phonograph cylinder, which was played together with the film during showings, the Tianyi Film Company's Spring on Stage (1931) – which used sound-on-film technology – has also been given this label (Xu 2012, p. 456).)

In the People's Republic of China, official histories of cinema have identified the arrival of leftist writers such as Qian Xingcun and Xia Yan in 1933 as marking the conversion of Mingxing into a "hub of left-wing film production". The Taiwanese film historian Du Yunzhi likewise noted leftist leanings in the company at this point. Such hirings were risky, as the KMT government was strictly opposed to the involvement of Chinese Communist Party members in cinema, and under Chiang Kai-shek it had massacred communists in Shanghai in 1927. Scripts by communist writers, thus, were anonymized to avoid censorship. Facing such pressures, including threats of physical violence, the leftist screenwriters withdrew from Mingxing in 1934; some returned in subsequent years, including workers from the closed Diantong Film Company.

== Analysis ==
=== Style ===
The Mingxing founders differed in their views of cinema's function. Zheng Zhengqiu advocated for an understanding of film as a means of promoting social reform, while Zhang Shichuan emphasized the commercial and entertainment value of the medium. He argued that it was necessary to "always pursue the current attractions and tastes in order to bring out merry laughter from the people". Consequently, the former advocated from the company's inception for films with educational messages, while the latter tended to follow trends. Later directors also differed in their approaches. Hong Shen, who had studied under George Pierce Baker in the United States, promoted the realist stylings of Eugene O'Neill and Henrik Ibsen.

Mingxing adapted numerous films from novels, including Lonely Orchid (1926) and its 1935 remake, as well as Fallen Plum Blossoms (1927) and Fate in Tears and Laughter (1932). Other films based on novels included The Phoenix Knight (1927), from the work by Li Hanqiu, and Taohua Lake (1930). Where works were not adapted from novels, the involvement of famed writers such as Cheng Xiaoqing, Tian Han, Xu Banmei, and Chen Lengxue were highlighted. Other source materials included Peking opera, which was popular with audiences in the late 1920s and early 1930s; elements of the genre featured in A Passionate Actress (1926) and Resurrection of Conscience (1926), and four opera songs were included with Song Song Girl Red Peony.

=== Themes ===
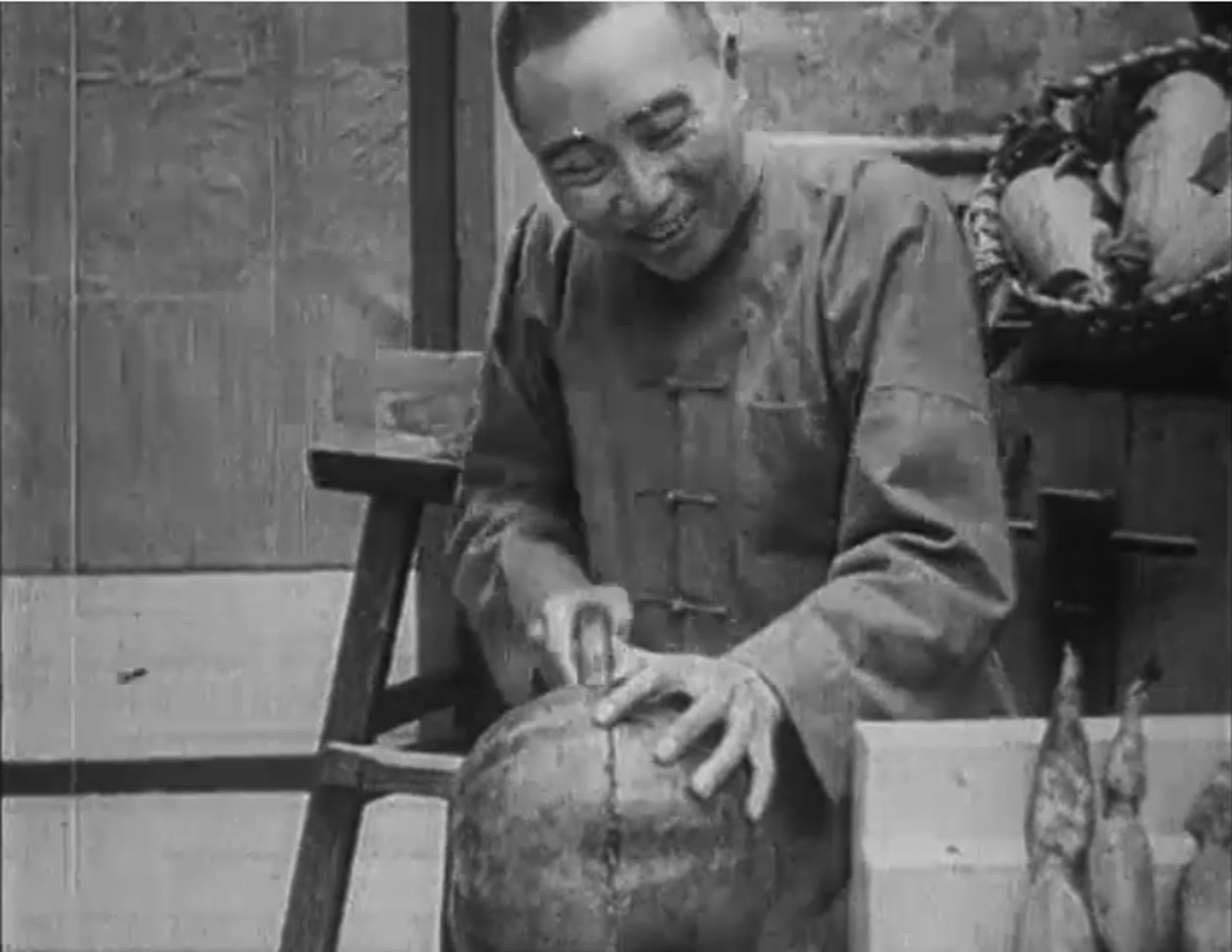
Carpenter Zheng "splitting the melon" in Labourer's Love; Mingxing's first films were comedies.

The first films produced by Mingxing were slapstick comedies, a genre that represented almost half of Chinese filmic production in 1922. The King of Comedy Visits Shanghai (1922) looked outward, with Charlie Chaplin – played by impersonator Richard Bell – visiting Shanghai and becoming involved in such gags as becoming trapped in a sedan chair or encountering a baby driving an oxcart. Labourer's Love, meanwhile, drew its humour from the hijinks of a carpenter-turned-fruit monger in love with a doctor's daughter; it also featured elements such as a reference to Harold Lloyd's "The Boy" character as well as a visual pun in which the main character Carpenter Zheng splits a melon, referencing a euphemism for taking a woman's virginity. The three-reel Havoc in a Bizarre Theatre, meanwhile, followed a distracted chef as he stumbles his way to stardom.

With the success of Orphan Rescues Grandfather in 1923, Mingxing focused predominantly on family melodramas. Through 1926, most of its output consisted of moralizing dramas, which were deemed suited for allowing "business plus conscience". Such works promoted specific values, including the importance of providing public education, and were often paired with some form of moral retribution; this retribution was not necessarily violent, but could involve a karmic balancing wherein the virtuous were rewarded and the sinful were punished. Mingxing was followed in the production of such films by other companies, such as Shenzhou.

After the success of The Burning of the Red Lotus Temple (1928), Mingxing produced some 27 costume dramas and martial arts films. The company used a combination of shooting techniques and hand-drawn special effects to simulate accelerated combat, while wire-flying was employed for aerial fights. The popularity of The Burning of the Red Lotus Temple stimulated the emergence of a subgenre of wuxia film, emulated by other Shanghai studios. However, critics decried the genre as pornographic and feudal in mindset, and it was banned as promoting superstition by the KMT government in 1931.

With the onset of the Second Sino-Japanese War in 1931, Mingxing – as with other Chinese production houses – produced a series of nationalistic films, including Iron Youth (1931) and Resurrecting the National Spirit (1932). Through the remainder of the decade, films dealing with contemporary issues remained popular. For example, Wild Torrent – directed by Cheng Bugao from a script by Xia Yan – dealt with the flooding of the Yangtze and conflicts emerging from the disaster. This film was praised both by leftist writers such Mao Dun as well as the KMT government. Other films dealing with social issues included Xu Xinfu's The Uprising (1934), which sympathetically followed salt miners rebelling against the capitalist business owners, and Shen Xiling's 24 Hours in Shanghai, which explored the hardships of Shanghai's urban poor.

Several of Mingxing's productions have been taken as examples of meta-film. The King of Comedy Visits Shanghai (1922) featured the titular king of comedy on a tour of the nascent studio and its film school, which the Chinese film historian Zheng Junli identifies as likely drawn from Mack Sennett and his work with Keystone Studios in the 1910s. Mingxing explored facets of stardom in A Passionate Actress (1926). An Amorous History of the Silver Screen (1931) has been described as semi-biographical in its following of the Xuan Jinglin–played protagonist's rise from prostitution to film stardom. In the film, Mingxing offered itself as a "magic workshop of virtual reality" that used modern lighting, extravagant set-pieces and innovative special effects.

== Selected works ==
During its fifteen years of operation, Mingxing produced 174 narrative films, including 128 silent films and 46 sound films. The majority of these were directed by Zhang Shichuan (69 films) and Zheng Zhengqiu (55), with other major directors including Cheng Bugao (37), Xu Xinfu (11), and Hong Shen (10). Most of the company's output is lost, with only twenty-four feature films known to have survived in whole or in part. The company also made five short cartoons, as well as newsreels and documentaries. Films produced by Mingxing include:

- The King of Comedy Visits Shanghai (1922)
- Labourer's Love (1922)
- Zhang Xinsheng (1923)
- Orphan Rescues Grandfather (1923)
- Lonely Orchid (1926)
- The Burning of the Red Lotus Temple (1928)
- An Amorous History of the Silver Screen (1931)
- Sing-Song Girl Red Peony (1931)
- Fate in Tears and Laughter (1932)
- Spring Silkworms (1933)
- The Classic for Girls (1934)
- Twin Sisters (1934)
- Crossroads (1937)
- Street Angel (1937)

== Works cited ==
- Chen Jianhua (陈建华) (24 August 2021). 《阎瑞生》摄制与剧照之百年回观 [A Century-long Review of the Filming and Stills of "Yan Ruisheng"]. The Paper (in Chinese). Archived from the original on 25 March 2026.
- Ding Zhongwei (丁忠伟) (2011). 周剑云:中国早期戏剧理论的建设者 [Zhou Jianyun: Builder of Early Chinese Drama Theory]. Big Stage (in Chinese) (8): 156–157.
- Fu, Poshek (2008). "Introduction". In Fu, Poshek (ed.). China Forever: The Shaw Brothers and Diasporic Cinema. Champaign: University of Illinois Press. pp. 1–26. ISBN 978-0-252-07500-1.
- Giesen, Rolf (2014). Chinese Animation: A History and Filmography, 1922-2012. Jefferson, North Carolina: McFarland. ISBN 978-1-4766-1552-3.
- Harris, Kristine (2012). "Two Stars on the Silver Screen: The Metafilm as Chinese Modern". In Henriot, Christian; Yeh, Wen-hsin (eds.). History in Images: Pictures and Public Space in Modern China. China Research Monograph. Vol. 66. Berkeley: Institute of East Asian Studies. pp. 191–244. ISBN 978-155729-155-4.
- Huang, Xuelei (2014). Shanghai Filmmaking: Crossing Borders, Connecting to the Globe, 1922–1938. Leiden: Brill. ISBN 978-90-04-27933-9.
- Huang, Xuelei (2022). "Beyond Labourer's Love: Rethinking Early Chinese Film Comedy". Journal of Chinese Film Studies. 2 (2): 277–297. doi:10.1515/jcfs-2022-0024. hdl:20.500.11820/76168f29-f931-4b31-bc4a-50b34ceb99e7.
- Huang Jiaming (黄加明) (30 August 2023). 明星影片公司 [Star Film Corporation]. Encyclopaedia of China (in Chinese) (3rd ed.). Archived from the original on 25 March 2026.
- Jia, Binwu (2022). "Zheng Zhegu and Performances in Early Chinese Film". Journal of Chinese Film Studies. 2 (2): 261–276. doi:10.1515/jcfs-2022-0002.
- Jiang Zhen (姜贞) (2009). 周剑云:中国电影业的儒商 [Zhou Jianyun: A Confucian Businessman in China's Film Industry]. Film and Art (in Chinese): 139–145.
- Jin Qi'an (金其安) (2009). 中国早期电影事业的开拓者周剑云 [Zhou Jianyun, The Pioneer of China's Early Film Industry]. Jianghuai Literature and History (in Chinese) (2): 133–141.
- Lee, Lily Xiao Hong (2015). "Hu Die". In Lee, Lily Xiao Hong; Stefanowska, A.D. (eds.). Biographical Dictionary of Chinese Women: The Twentieth Century, 1912–2000. London and New York: Routledge. pp. 236–242. ISBN 978-0-7656-0043-1.
- Luo, Dan; Ye, Tan; Zhu, Yun (2024). Historical Dictionary of Chinese Cinema. Lanham, Maryland: Rowman & Littlefield. ISBN 978-1-5381-5730-5.
- Luo, Ting (2024). "From Self-Promotion to Demystification: Self-Reflexivity and Realism in Chinese Cinema". Journal of Film and Video. 76 (4): 5–18. doi:10.5406/19346018.76.4.02.
- McKenna, Amy (1 August 2024). "Second Sino-Japanese War". Encyclopaedia Britannica. Archived from the original on 25 March 2026.
- Qian, Ying (2024). Revolutionary Becomings: Documentary Media in Twentieth-Century China. New York: Columbia University Press. ISBN 978-0-231-55555-5.
- Rea, Christopher (2021). Chinese Film Classics, 1922–1949. New York: Columbia University Press. ISBN 978-0-231-18813-5.
- Sugawara, Yoshino (2015). 映画史から忘却された「儒商」、任矜蘋―教育者、愛国者、映画監督 [Ren Jinping, the Forgotten Confucian Merchant from Film History: Educator, Patriot and Filmmaker]. Yasō (in Japanese). 95: 21–49.
- Teo, Stephen (2015). Chinese Martial Arts Cinema. Edinburgh: Edinburgh University Press. doi:10.1515/9781474403887-005. ISBN 978-1-4744-0388-7.
- Wei, S. Louisa (2017). Gaines, Jane; Vatsal, Radha; Dall’Asta, Monica (eds.). "Helen Wang". Women Film Pioneers Project. Columbia University Libraries. doi:10.7916/d8-zc8b-7c47. Archived from the original on 3 December 2024.
- Wei, S. Louisa (2018). Gaines, Jane; Vatsal, Radha; Dall’Asta, Monica (eds.). "Yang Naimei". Women Film Pioneers Project. Columbia University Libraries. doi:10.7916/d8-care-1e44. Archived from the original on 25 December 2019.
- Xiao, Zhiwei (1998). "Chinese Cinema". In Zhang, Yingjin; Xiao, Zhiwei (eds.). Encyclopedia of Chinese Film. New York, London: Routledge. pp. 3–30. ISBN 978-0-415-15168-9.
- Xiao, Zhiwei (1998). "Burning of Red Lotus Temple, The". In Zhang, Yingjin; Xiao, Zhiwei (eds.). Encyclopedia of Chinese Film. New York, London: Routledge. p. 103. ISBN 978-0-415-15168-9.
- Xiao, Zhiwei (1998). "Orphan Rescues Grandfather". In Zhang, Yingjin; Xiao, Zhiwei (eds.). Encyclopedia of Chinese Film. New York, London: Routledge. pp. 258–259. ISBN 978-0-415-15168-9.
- Xiao, Zhiwei (1998). "Zhang Shichuan". In Zhang, Yingjin; Xiao, Zhiwei (eds.). Encyclopedia of Chinese Film. New York, London: Routledge. p. 390. ISBN 978-0-415-15168-9.
- Xiao, Zhiwei; Zhang, Yingjin (1998). "Zhou Jianyun". In Zhang, Yingjin; Xiao, Zhiwei (eds.). Encyclopedia of Chinese Film. New York, London: Routledge. p. 394. ISBN 978-0-415-15168-9.
- Xu, Gary (2012). "Chinese Cinema and Technology". In Zhang, Yingjin (ed.). A Companion to Chinese Cinema. Hoboken, New Jersey: Wiley. pp. 449–465. doi:10.1002/9781444355994. ISBN 978-1-4443-5599-4.
- Yeh, Yueh-Yu (2002). "Historiography and Sinification: Music in Chinese Cinema of the 1930s". Cinema Journal. 41 (3): 78–97. doi:10.1353/cj.2002.0012. JSTOR 1225700.
- Zhang, Yingjin (1998). "Censorship and Film". In Zhang, Yingjin; Xiao, Zhiwei (eds.). Encyclopedia of Chinese Film. New York, London: Routledge. pp. 109–110. ISBN 978-0-415-15168-9.
- Zhang, Yingjin (2004). Chinese National Cinema. London: Psychology Press. ISBN 978-0-415-17289-9.
- Zhang Yue (张岳) (2014). 于无声处听惊雷 ——浅析中国早期有声电影的试制 [Hearing Thunder in Silence: A Brief Analysis of the Trial Production of Early Chinese Sound Films] (PDF). Media Research (in Chinese). 12 (1): 1–13. Archived from the original (PDF) on 28 November 2024.
- Zhang, Zhen (2005). An Amorous History of the Silver Screen: Shanghai Cinema, 1896–1937. Chicago: University of Chicago Press. ISBN 978-0-226-98238-0.
- Zhong, Dafeng; Zhang, Zhen; Zhang, Yingjin (1997). "From Wenmingxi (Civilized Play) to Yingxi (Shadowplay): The Foundation of Shanghai Film Industry in the 1920s". Asian Cinema. 9 (1): 46–64. doi:10.1386/ac.9.1.46_1.
- Zhu, Ying (2022). Hollywood in China: Behind the Scenes of the World's Largest Movie Market. New York: The New Press. ISBN 978-1-62097-219-9.
