= The Classic for Girls =

- Film poster
- Directed by: Cheng Bugao; Chen Kengran; Li Pingqian; Shen Xiling; Xu Xinfu; Yao Sufeng; Zhang Shichuan; Zheng Zhengqiu
- Cinematography: Dong Keyi; Wang Shizhen; Yan Bingheng; Zhou Shimu; Chen Chen
- Music by: He Zhaozhang; He Maogang
- Production company: Mingxing Film Company
- Release date: 9 October 1934 (China)
- Running time: 159 minutes
- Country: Republic of China
- Language: Mandarin

The Classic for Girls (simplified Chinese: 女儿经; traditional Chinese: 女兒經; pinyin: Nǔ ér jīng) is a 1934 Chinese film directed by Cheng Bugao, Chen Kengran, Li Pingqian, Shen Xiling, Xu Xinfu, Yao Sufeng, Zhang Shichuan and Zheng Zhengqiu. This movie was inspired by a novel after the same name, which depicted the repressive society women in China were under back then.
