= Twin Sisters (1934 film) =

- The full film
- Directed by: Zheng Zhengqiu
- Written by: Zheng Zhengqiu (novel); Zheng Zhengqiu (screenplay)
- Starring: Hu Die
- Cinematography: Dong Keyi
- Music by: He Zhaozhang
- Release date: February 13, 1934 (China)
- Running time: 82 minutes
- Country: China
- Language: Mandarin

Twin Sisters (Chinese: 姊妹花; pinyin: Zǐ mèi hūa) is a 1934 Chinese film directed by Zheng Zhengqiu.

== Cast ==
- Hu Die, playing double roles as the twin sisters
- Zheng Xiaoqiu as Tao Ge
- Tan Zhiyuan as Father
- Xuan Jinglin as Mother
- Gu Meijun as Miss Qian
- Xu Shenyuan as Governor Qian
