= Li Pingqian =

Chinese filmmaker

- Born: 1902; Hangzhou, Qing Empire
- Died: November 18, 1984 (aged 81–82); British Hong Kong
- Other names: Jack Li, Lee Ping-chien, Lee Ping-sin
- Occupation(s): Film director, screenwriter, occasional actor

Chinese name
- Chinese: 李萍倩
Transcriptions
Standard Mandarin
- Hanyu Pinyin: Lǐ Píngqiàn

Li Pingqian (1902 – 18 November 1984), also known as Jack Pingqian Li, was a Chinese filmmaker who directed over 100 films in his career in mainland China and Hong Kong. He is probably best known for his works with actresses Gong Qiuxia and Xia Meng, who each starred in more than a dozen of his films. Moreover, his 1964 Huangmei opera film Three Charming Smiles starring Chen Sisi was a huge hit in China.

== Life ==
Li was born in Hangzhou and was originally given the name Chunchou. He moved to Shangai in the 1920s to begin a career in filmmaking after leaving Hujiang University in 1919, where he studied sociology but did not graduate. In 1924, he co-founded Shenzhou Film Company with Wu Xuchang. The company went bankrupt in 1927 and Li joined Tianyi Film Company. He eventually moved on to Mingxing Film Company, until that was destroyed by Japanese bombardments during World War II.

In the 1950s, Li moved to Hong Kong and became directing Cantonese films for companies such as Yonghua and Great Wall Film Company.

Many of Li's earlier works are lost.

== Filmography ==
=== As actor ===
Year	English title	Original title	Role	Director	Notes
1925	Unbearable Memories	不堪回首	Zhu Wenguang		Lost
1925	Wedding Day	佳期			Lost
1925	The Night with the Full Moon	花好月圆			Lost
1926	Embarrassing Sister	難為了妹妹		Yes	Lost
1927	A Crushing Blow	劉關張大破黃巾			Lost
1927	The Female Lawyer	女律師			Lost
1928	Precious Ruby	紅寶石		Yes	Lost
1928	Stories of Sherlock Holmes	福爾摩斯偵探案	Sherlock Holmes	Yes	Lost
1955	It So Happens to a Woman	我是一個女人		Yes	

=== As director ===
Year	English title	Chinese title	Notes
1926	Embarrassing Sister	難為了妹妹	Also actor
1926	My Good Boy	好兒子	Co-director
1927	Princess Iron Fan	鐵扇公主	Co-director
1927	New Camellia	新茶花	
1927	Maiden in Armour	花木蘭從軍	
1927	Wails to Pagoda	仕林祭塔	Co-director
1927	Ladies Kingdom	西遊記·女兒國	Co-director
1928	The Lotus Cave	蓮花洞	Also writer
1928	Precious Ruby	紅寶石	Two-part film, also writer and actor
1929	Emperor Qianlong Tours the South Part III	乾隆遊江南第3集	
1929	Lonely Swan After the Calamity	劫後孤鴻	Also writer
1929	Warnings for the Lovers	情慾寶鑑	
1929	Flowers Platform on Fire	火燒百花臺	Two-part film
1930	Yang Yunyou and Dong Qichang	楊雲友與董其昌	
1930	The Queen of College Students	大學皇后	Two-part film
1931	Between Themselves	夫妻之間	
1931	Stories of Sherlock Holmes	福爾摩斯偵探案	Also actor
1931	Arsène Lupin	亞森羅賓	
1931	Emperor Qianlong Tours the South Part VIII	乾隆遊江南第8集	
1931	Emperor Qianlong Tours the South Part IX	乾隆遊江南第9集	
1931	Pleasures of the Dance Hall	歌唱春色	
1932	Miss Shanghai Han Xiuwen	上海小姐韓繡雯	
1932	Two Daughters of the Northeast	東北二女子	
1932	Old and New Problems	舊恨新愁	
1932	Poetry Written on the Banana Leaf	芭蕉葉上詩	
1932	A Married Woman	有夫之婦	
1933	A Modern Woman	現代一女性	
1933	Good Harvest	豐年	
1933	Sons and Daughters of the Times	時代的兒女	
1933	The Spring Dream of the Lute	琵琶春怨	Also writer
1934	Three Sisters	三姊妹	Also co-writer
1934	The Classic for Girls	女兒經	Co-director
1935	Ardent, Loyal Souls	民族魂	Co-director
1935	Human Being	人倫	Also writer
1936	The Battle Between Peach and Plum	桃李爭艷	Also writer
1936	Rendezvous	夜會	
1937	The Flower Blossoms and Wilts	花開花落	
1938	A Pair in Love	鳳求凰	
1938	Camille	茶花女	Also writer
1939	The World of Money	金銀世界	
1939	The Imperial Maid Fei Zhen'e	費貞娥刺虎	Also writer
1939	The Young Mistress' Fan	少奶奶的扇子	
1939	Regrets of Life and Death	生死恨	Also writer
1940	Du Shiniang	杜十娘	Also writer
1940	Hongxian Steals the Case	紅線盜盒	
1941	The Living Way	生路	
1941	The Family	家	Co-director
1941	Where Will You Go	生離死別	Also writer
1941	The Brave Lady	英烈傳	Also writer
1941	The Widow	風流寡婦	
1941	King of the Inferno	地藏王	
1942	Compassion	博愛	Co-director
1942	A Distinguished Lady	貴婦風流	Also writer
1942	Four Sisters	四姊妹	Also writer
1942	Two Guys and a Girl	歡喜冤家	Also writer
1943	Gratitude and Vengeance of Actors	藝海恩仇記	Also writer
1943	The Fight over a Child	桃李爭春	
1943	Floating Clouds Cover the Moon	浮雲掩月	
1943	Madam Butterfly	蝴蝶夫人	
1944	Song from Another Heaven	天外笙歌	
1944	Drifting Petals	惜花飞	
1945	New Year Day	萬戶更新	Co-director
1947	Mother and Son	母與子	
1947	Spring over the Lake	湖上春痕	Also writer
1947	Hang on to Your Relatives	裙帶風	
1948	The Murderer	兇手	
1948	Catch the Dream	春歸何處	
1949	Our Husband	春雷	Also writer
1950	A Strange Woman	一代妖姬	
1950	The Awful Truth	說謊世界	
1951	A Night-Time Wife	禁婚記	
1952	Blossoms in the Heart	百花齊放	
1952	A Bachelor Is Born	方帽子	
1952	City Adventure	蜜月	
1953	Marriage Affair	門	
1953	Day Dream	白日夢	
1953	Parents' Love	寸草心	
1953	The Peerless Beauty	絕代佳人	
1954	Tales of the City	都會交響曲	
1955	It So Happens to a Woman	我是一個女人	Also actor
1956	The Three Loves	三戀	
1957	Escape into Trap	逆旅風雲	
1957	Forever Waiting	望夫山下	
1958	Miss Fragrance	香噴噴小姐	
1958	The Green Swan Club	綠天鵝夜總會	
1960	Girl on the Front Page	新聞人物	
1960	Laugh, Clown, Laugh	笑笑笑	
1960	Rendezvous	佳人有約	
1961	The Seaman and the Dancing Girl	華燈初上	
1961	A Dazzling Trap	迷魂阱	
1962	The Princess Falls in Love	三看御妹劉金定	Yue opera film
1963	Between Vengeance and Love	雪地情仇	
1964	Three Charming Smiles	三笑	Huangmei opera film
1965	Romantic World	艷遇	
1965	A Heroic Romance	烽火姻緣	Yue opera film

== In popular culture ==
In the 2008 Chinese TV series Zhao Dan (赵丹), Li Pingqian is portrayed by actor Meng Jun (孟俊).
