= Shen Xiling =

Chinese film director

- Born: 1904; Hangzhou, Zhejiang, China
- Died: 17 December 1940 (aged 36); Chongqing, China
- Occupations: Film director, Screenwriter, Producer

Chinese name
- Traditional Chinese: 沈西苓
- Simplified Chinese: 沈西苓
Transcriptions
Standard Mandarin
- Hanyu Pinyin: Shěn Xīlíng
Yue: Cantonese
- Jyutping: Sam2 Sai1ling4

Shen Xiling (1904 – 17 December 1940) was a Chinese film director.

== Partial filmography ==
Year	English Title	Chinese Title	Notes
1934	The Classic for Girls	女兒經	Co-directed with Zhang Shichuan, Yao Sufeng, Cheng Bugao, Xu Xingfu, Li Pingqian, Chen Kengran, and Zheng Zhengqiu
1934	24 Hours in Shanghai	上海二十四小时	
1935	Ardent, Loyal Souls	熱血忠魂	Co-directed with Zhang Shichuan, Wu Cun, Cheng Bugao, Xu Xingfu, Li Pingqian, and Zheng Zhengqiu
1935	The Boatman's Daughter	船家女	
1937	Crossroads	十字街頭	
