= Zhang Xinsheng (film) =

1923 crime film directed by Zhang Shichuan

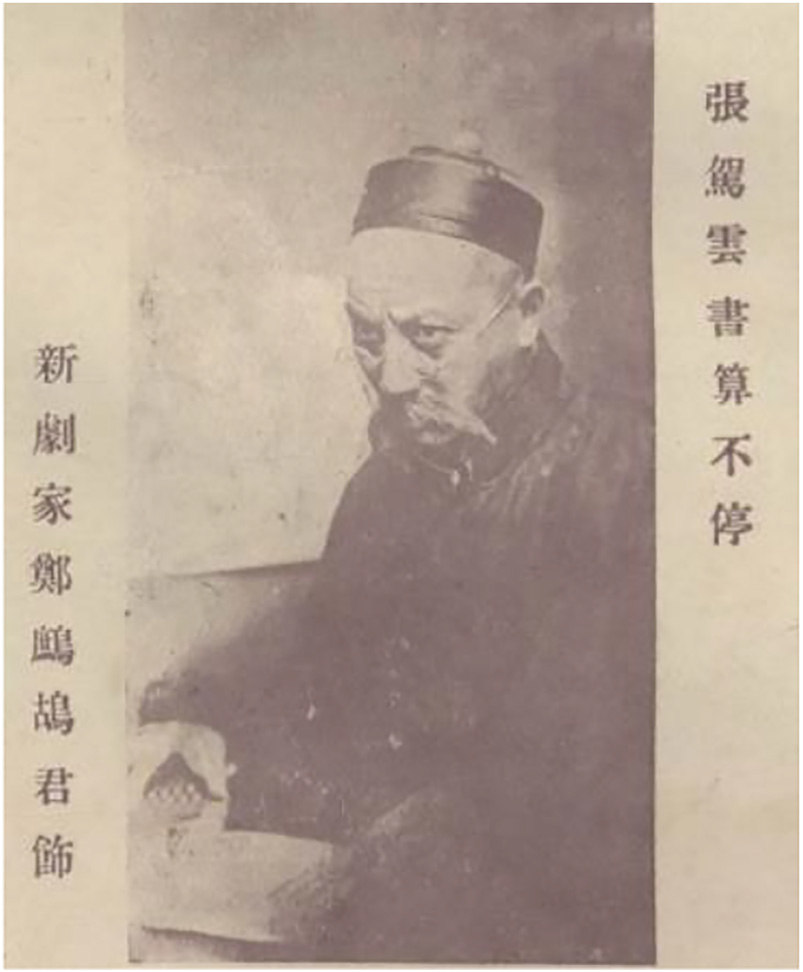
- Zheng Zhegu as Zhang Jiayun
- Traditional Chinese: 張欣生
- Simplified Chinese: 张欣生
Transcriptions
Standard Mandarin
- Hanyu Pinyin: Zhāng Xīnshēng
- Directed by: Zhang Shichuan
- Screenplay by: Zheng Zhengqiu
- Starring: Zheng Xiaoqiu; Zheng Zhegu
- Cinematography: Zhang Weitao
- Production company: Mingxing Film Company
- Release date: 16 February 1923 (Shanghai)
- Running time: 13 reels
- Country: Republic of China
- Language: Silent

Zhang Xinsheng (traditional Chinese: 張欣生; simplified Chinese: 张欣生; pinyin: Zhāng Xīnshēng), also known as Retribution (報應昭彰; 报应昭彰; Bàoyìng Zhāozhāng) is a lost 1923 crime film from the Republic of China. Directed by Zhang Shichuan, it was adapted by Zheng Zhengqiu from a real-life patricide in which a deeply indebted man had killed his father for his inheritance. Emphasizing verisimilitude in its production and advertising, Zhang Xinsheng was initially a modest success but was later censored for its graphic violence.

== Production ==
Zhang Xinsheng was based on a real-life patricide case. In 1920, a Pudong youth named Zhang Xinsheng, deeply in debt, had poisoned his wealthy father Zhang Jiayun to gain access to his inheritance. A year later, following up on a tip from an accomplice, the police had exhumed the body and conducted a public autopsy. Analyzing the colour of the bones, the police declared a murder to have occurred. Zhang had been arrested, found guilty, and sentenced to death by hanging. This case had drawn extensive media coverage, including in major newspapers such as the Shen Bao and the Xinwen Bao.

Capitalizing on the coverage, which also included stage performances and works of "news fiction" (新闻小说), the Mingxing Film Company began adapting the case to screen. Established in 1922, Mingxing had previously produced a series of comedies, including The King of Comedy Visits Shanghai and Labourer's Love (both 1922). However, these films had not been commercial successes, and Mingxing was on the verge of insolvency. Zhang Xinsheng was directed by Zhang Shichuan, who operated under the philosophy of prioritizing entertainment and mass appeal. It was based on a screenplay by Zheng Zhengqiu, with cinematography handled by Zhang Weitao. Members of the cast included Zheng Xiaoqiu, the teenaged son of Zheng Zhengqiu, as well as Zheng Zhegu as Zhang Jiayun.

The filmmakers emphasized verisimilitude in their production of Zhang Xinsheng. A 1923 Shen Bao report noted that location shooting had occurred at the Zhang ancestral home, Jiangsu No. 2 Prison, and the Sanlintang area of Pudong. Advertising material emphasized that the film had been shot at nineteen different locations, offering "a sense of realism [that] cannot be achieved for stage plays." Cheng Bugao, a viewer who later became a director with Mingxing, recalled that the film had offered close-up shots of the autopsy and the removal of organs – made using flour and red ink – and thereby disgusted audiences. Nonetheless, the film is recorded as including some embellishment.

== Release and reception ==
Zhang Xinsheng premièred at the Olympic Theatre in Shanghai on 16 February 1923. Tickets were initially priced at 1 to 1.5 yuan (equivalent to ¥100 to ¥150 in 2019) each. Audience reception was tepid, and thus ticket prices were reduced to 0.2 to 0.8 yuan (equivalent to ¥20 to ¥80 in 2019) each. With these new prices, audiences began to flock to showings, which continued for 27 days between six theatres in Shanghai. By 5 March, Zhang Xinsheng had earned 6,000 yuan (equivalent to ¥593,000 in 2019) in box office revenues. Screenings are recorded as late as 18 July 1924, and also occurred in Beijing, Tianjin, Hankou, Jinan, and Nanjing.

Backlash against crime films such as Zhang Xinsheng and Yan Ruisheng, a 1920 film by the Chinese Cinema Study Society that had similarly emphasized verisimilitude, resulted in efforts to censor films that "disturbed social order, damaged social mores and (in the case of foreign films particularly) were offensive to Chinese sensibility". The Department of Mass Education at the Republic of China's Ministry of Education in Beijing published guidelines for film censorship in 1926, and press discourses argued that such films incentivized crimes and other immoral acts. Facing such pressure, Mingxing amended several scenes in mid-1923, emphasizing the culprit's remorse and highlighting the deleterious influence of gambling and narcotics.

The success of Zhang Xinsheng helped ameliorate Mingxing's financial situation, though it was still floundering. The company only achieved financial stability following its next film, Orphan Rescues Grandfather (1923), a major commercial success for which one distributor offered up to nine thousand yuan (equivalent to ¥890,000 in 2019) for distribution rights. In its later years, Mingxing excluded Zhang Xinsheng from its internal histories, including its filmographies; director Zhang Shichuan later deemed it a complete failure. This film, which was thirteen reels in length, is now lost.

== Works cited ==
- Huang, Xuelei (2014). Shanghai Filmmaking: Crossing Borders, Connecting to the Globe, 1922–1938. China Studies. Vol. 29. Leiden: Brill. doi:10.1163/9789004279346. ISBN 978-90-04-27933-9.
- Huang, Xuelei (2022). "Beyond Labourer's Love: Rethinking Early Chinese Film Comedy". Journal of Chinese Film Studies. 2 (2): 277–297. doi:10.1515/jcfs-2022-0024. hdl:20.500.11820/76168f29-f931-4b31-bc4a-50b34ceb99e7.
- Jia, Binwu (2022). "Zheng Zhegu and Performances in Early Chinese Film". Journal of Chinese Film Studies. 2 (2): 261–276. doi:10.1515/jcfs-2022-0002.
- Jiang Zhen (姜贞) (2009). 周剑云:中国电影业的儒商 [Zhou Jianyun: A Confucian Businessman in China's Film Industry]. Film and Art (in Chinese): 139–145.
- Johnson, Matthew D. (2015). "Regional Cultural Enterprises and Cultural Markets in Early Republican China: The Motion Picture as Case Study". Cross-Currents: East Asian History and Culture Review. 4 (2): 658–693. doi:10.1353/ach.2015.0041.
- Sugawara, Yoshino (2018). "Toward the Opposite Side of 'Vulgarity'". Early Film Culture in Hong Kong, Taiwan, and Republican China. Ann Arbor: University of Michigan Press. pp. 179–201. doi:10.2307/j.ctt22727c7.11. ISBN 978-0-472-07372-6. JSTOR j.ctt22727c7.11.
- Xiao, Zhiwei (2013). "Policing Film in Early Twentieth-Century China". In Rojas, Carlos; Chow, Eileen (eds.). The Oxford Handbook of Chinese Cinemas. Oxford: Oxford University Press. pp. 452–471. doi:10.1093/oxfordhb/9780199765607.013.0025. ISBN 978-0-19-998331-5.
- Zhang, Yingjin (1998). "Censorship and Film". In Zhang, Yingjin; Xiao, Zhiwei (eds.). Encyclopedia of Chinese Film. New York, London: Routledge. pp. 109–110. ISBN 978-0-415-15168-9.
- Zhang, Zhen (2005). An Amorous History of the Silver Screen: Shanghai Cinema, 1896–1937. Chicago: University of Chicago Press. ISBN 978-0-226-98238-0.
