= Zheng Zhegu =

Chinese actor and entrepreneur (1880–1925)

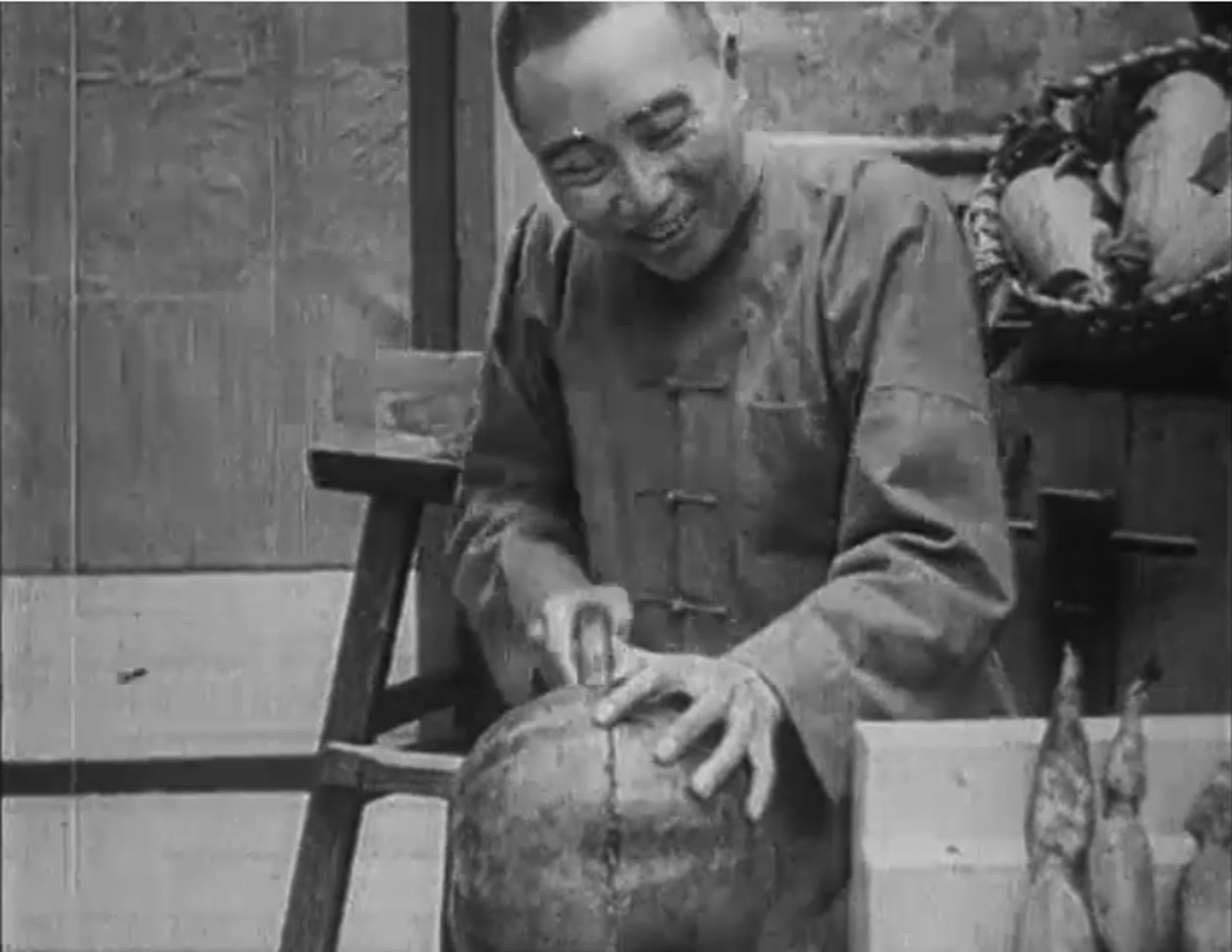
- Zheng as Carpenter Zheng in Labourer's Love (1922)
- Born: Zheng Lian (郑廉); 1880; Nanjing, Qing China
- Died: 1925 (aged 44–45); Shanghai, Republic of China
- Other name: Zheng Jiecheng (郑介诚)
- Occupations: Actor, entrepreneur

Chinese name
- Traditional Chinese: 鄭鷓鴣
- Simplified Chinese: 郑鹧鸪
Transcriptions
Standard Mandarin
- Hanyu Pinyin: Zhèng Zhègū
- Wade–Giles: Cheng^{4} Che^{4}ku^{1}

Zheng Zhegu (simplified Chinese: 郑鹧鸪; traditional Chinese: 鄭鷓鴣; pinyin: Zhèng Zhègū, 1880–1925) was a Chinese actor and entrepreneur. The son of a Qing official, he served in the military before joining the anti-Qing movement. Forced into hiding, he joined the Republic of China military after the 1911 revolution but left government service and moved to Shanghai after growing disillusioned. Long interested in Peking opera and other forms of drama, Zheng joined several troupes while gaining a reputation as a stage performer. In the late 1910s, he became involved in publishing through the Xinmin Library.

In 1922, Zheng co-founded the Mingxing Film Company with Ren Jinping, Zhang Shichuan, Zheng Zhengqiu, and Zhou Jianyun. While heading the company's screenwriting department and teaching at its film school, he starred in several of its early productions, making his film debut with the simultaneously released The King of Comedy Visits Shanghai and Labourer's Love (both 1922). In the next three years, Zheng appeared in several further films, dying during the production of The Last Conscience (1925). He gained critical acclaim for his diverse roles and, later, his naturalistic performances.

== Biography ==
=== Early life ===
Zheng was born Zheng Lian (郑廉) in Nanjing, Qing China, in 1880. The son of Zheng Moqin, a government official who traced his roots to She County, Anhui, he attended the Jiangnan Military Academy and became a junior officer in the Ninth Division of the New Army. A 1921 retrospective, published after the overthrow of the Qing dynasty, described him as gaining a hatred of the regime and seeking "the restoration of China as his own duty". He thus joined the anti-Qing movement. Facing suspicion for these activities, he left the military.

To evade capture, Zheng engaged in various businesses, becoming the manager of two customs brokers, Jinyuan and Gongji. He also became a member of the Jiangning Chamber of Commerce, acting as communications officer, as well as a broker on the China Stock Exchange. Following the 1911 revolution, which resulted in the Qing dynasty being replaced by the Republic of China, Zheng returned to the military. Amid the political tumult of the early republic, he grew disillusioned, left the military, and moved to Shanghai. He took the courtesy name Zheng Jiecheng (郑介诚).

=== Drama and publishing ===
Zheng had an interest in the theatre, including Peking opera, from his youth. In the 1910s, he became a leading member of the Eternal Memory Society fan-club. In 1914, he established the River East Society, a theatrical troupe; he later joined Lu Jingruo's New Play Comrade Society. In the latter, he interacted with Song Chiping, Dong Tianya, Dong Tianmin, and Ouyang Yuqian, all of whom would later enter Shanghai cinema. In Shanghai, Zheng was hired by Zheng Zhengqiu to teach at the Yaofeng Drama Academy. While teaching, he also performed on stage, gaining recognition for what the critic Zhou Jianyun deemed a "solemn attitude, upright speech, sense of concision, moderation, and possessing the air of a knowledgeable person". He specialized in playing older men, but at times portrayed younger characters, sometimes humorous, sometimes stoic. He adopted the stage name Zheng Zhegu while performing in spoken-word dramas.

At the same time, Zheng participated in several publication ventures. With Zheng Zhengqiu and Zhou Jianyun, he established the Xinmin Library in late 1918 or early 1919. The company, with Zheng Zhegu as its general manager, published magazines such as the Yaofeng Monthly and the Emancipation Pictorial. Another of the company's publications, the newspaper Spring Voice Daily, frequently featured articles penned by Zheng. As a result of his involvement with Xinmin, Zheng was elected to the judicial board of the Shanghai Book Company, serving as its chairman. He also sat on the committees of several business associations, and served as the chairman of the Shanghai Hui-ning Native-place Association.

=== Mingxing Film Company and death ===
In 1922, Zheng established the Mingxing Film Company together with Ren Jinping, Zhang Shichuan, Zheng Zhengqiu, and Zhou Jianyun. He had worked with several of them at the Mutual Stock and Produce Exchange Company, which collapsed in 1921. After fundraising efforts failed, the men were required to use their own funds as start-up capital for this venture, which they deemed less risky than stocks; each contributed 10,000 yuan (equivalent to ¥1,052,000 in 2019). (Note: Inflated values automatically calculated based on published datasets. For comparison, in 1920s Shanghai, the average monthly expenses for an unmarried unskilled worker was 11.85 yuan; an unmarried skilled worker in the same period averaged 19.26 yuan per month in expenses (Xu 2000, p. 61).) The oldest of the company's founders, Zheng headed its screenwriting department and served as the registrar of its film school. Although the school offered courses for both male and female students, no women initially showed interest. Zheng thus urged his students to invite their girlfriends.

Zheng also regularly performed on screen, drawing on his dramatic experience to star in the company's films. His first appearances were two comedies, released simultaneously: The King of Comedy Visits Shanghai and Labourer's Love (both 1922). The former film depicted a fictional visit by Charlie Chaplin to Shanghai, with Zheng playing the manager of the Star Film Company. In the latter, Zheng portrayed a carpenter-turned-fruitmonger who falls in love with a doctor's daughter. Zheng gained acclaim for his performance in Labourer's Love, one critic identifying him as setting a new benchmark for acting and another lauding him as an East-Asian Lewis Stone. Neither film was a commercial success, and other cinemas failed to pick them up after their initial four-day run.

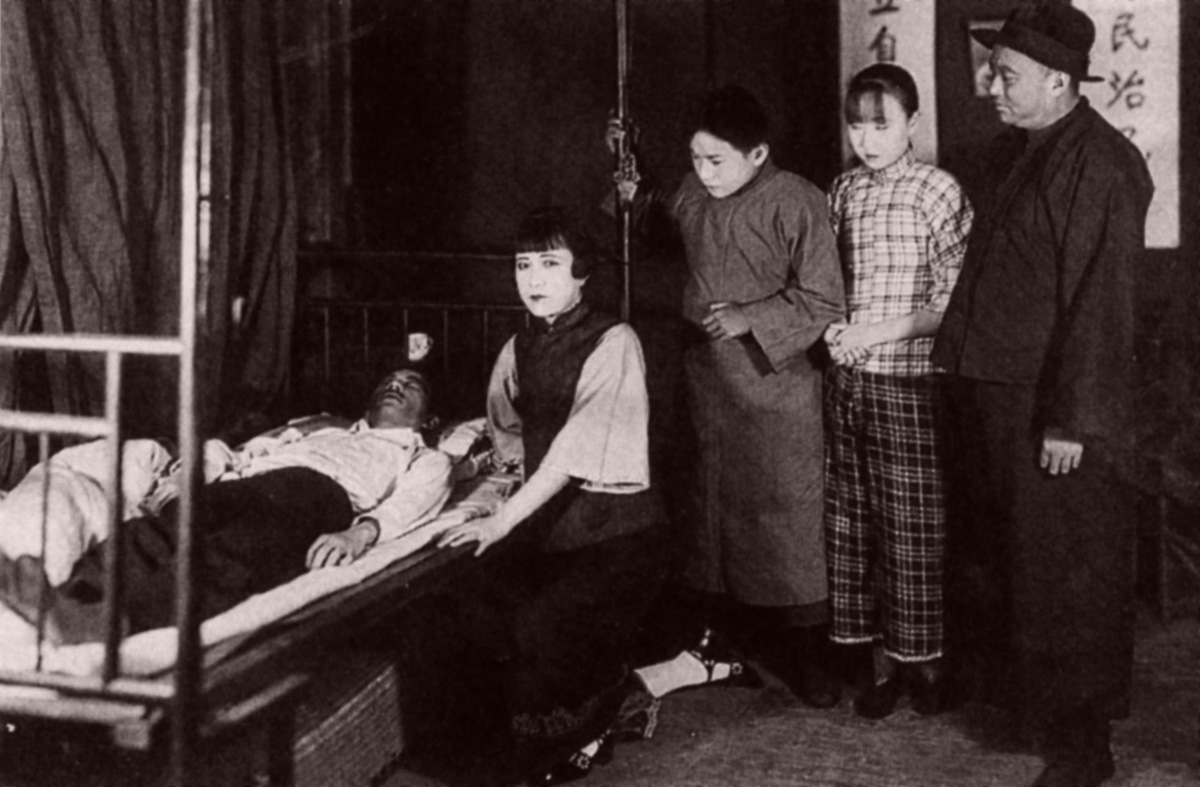
Zheng as a bedridden grandfather in Orphan Rescues Grandfather (1923), with Wang Hanlun at his side

Also in 1922, Zheng portrayed a violent bandit in Good Elder Brother, as well as the character Zhang Jiayun in the crime drama Zhang Xinsheng. Based on a real-life court-case, the film was Mingxing's first commercial success, earning more than 6,000 yuan (equivalent to ¥600,000 in 2019) during its 27-day run. Although this film helped improve Mingxing's finances, the company remained in a precarious state, and its next film – Havoc in a Bizarre Theatre (1923), a slapstick comedy in which Zheng portrayed a chef with dreams of stardom – failed to entice audiences.

With Mingxing close to bankruptcy, the company committed to one more feature-length film: Orphan Rescues Grandfather, a melodrama wherein Zheng portrayed a kindly grandfather. This film, which premiered on 21 December 1923, was an immediate commercial success, running for almost 100 days in Shanghai; further screenings were held in Beijing, Nanjing, and Suzhou in subsequent months. One distributor offered up to 9,000 yuan (equivalent to ¥900,000 in 2019) for the right to show the film in Southeast Asia. The success of this film enabled Mingxing to survive and expand in subsequent years.

As Zheng continued to act for Mingxing, he honed his craft. He later described himself as initially having no knowledge of cinema, instead just "rushing around". After receiving guidance from an American shooting a film in China, he sought to present a "clean and natural" performance, "without meaningless actions". At the same time, he coached Mingxing's new hires, including the actresses Wang Hanlun and Yang Naimei as well as the actors Wang Jiting and Shao Zhuanglin. He taught students to balance cautiousness and dramatization, urging them to "express the identity, situation, and temperament of the movie role step-by-step".

In 1924, Zheng took another three roles for Mingxing. In Jade Pear Spirit, adapted from the novel by Xu Zhenya, he portrayed a young teacher named Qin Shichi. This film, a modest success that ran in Shanghai for forty days, was followed by The Poor Children, in which Zheng played a lawyer. Finally, in Love and Vanity, he took on a villainous role; the reviewer Chigong wrote in SB that Zheng "portrays a vivid picture of a sinister villain, and his facial expression can change anytime and anywhere". While filming The Last Conscience (1925), Zheng fell seriously ill, later dying of his illness. The contemporary critic Linfu wrote in Yingxi Chunqiu, "when Zheng Zhegu died, the Chinese film industry seemed to have lost half of its soul". The Last Conscience was completed with actor Wang Xianzhai taking over the starring role.

== Analysis ==
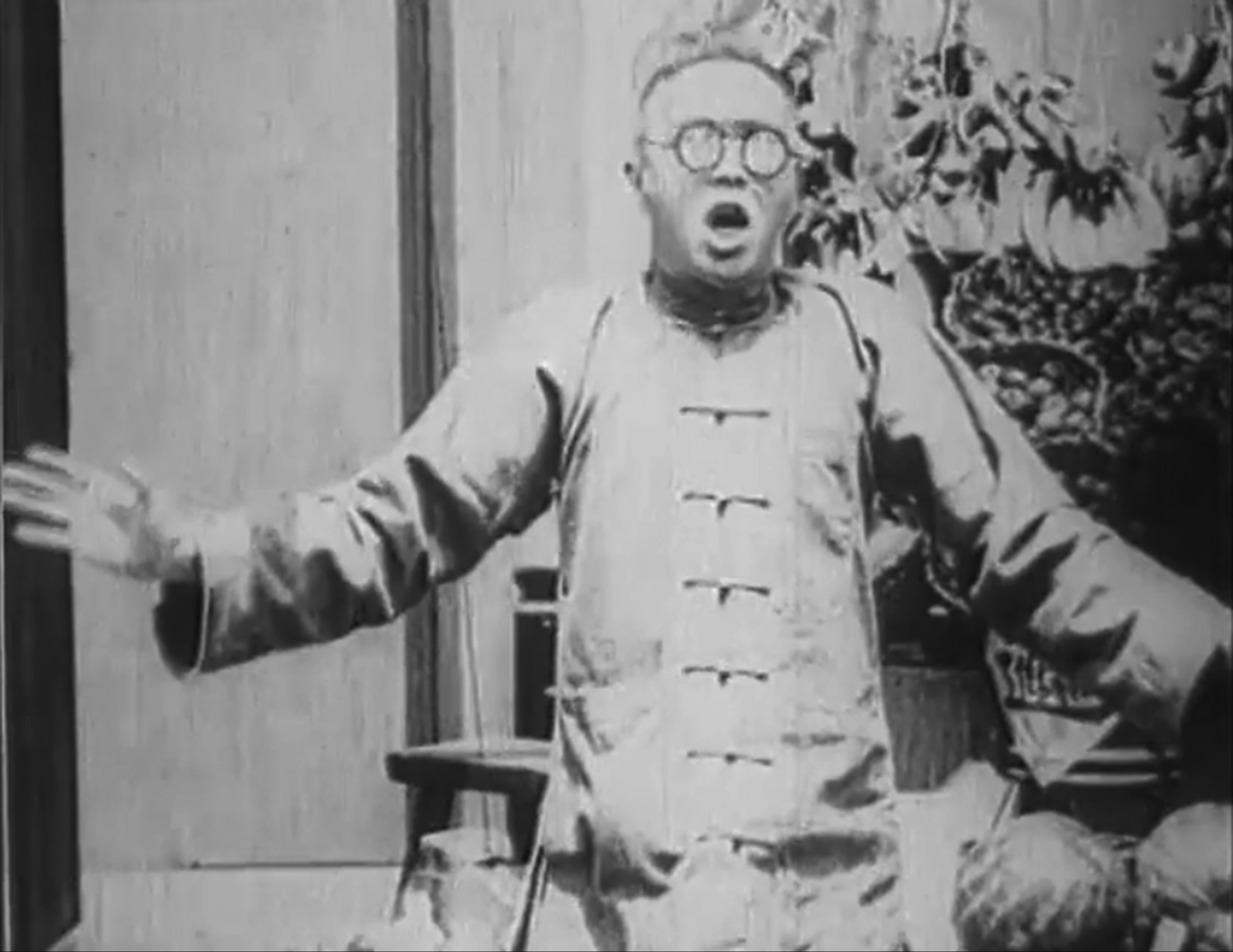
Zheng as Carpenter Zheng in Labourer's Love; the character has been likened to those of Harold Lloyd.

In their review of Chinese cinematic history, Chen Jingliang and Zou Jianwen describe Zheng as one of the silent era's most important actors. Although most of his films are lost, contemporary reviews provide insight into his performances. Generally, his stylings were lauded by contemporary viewers, as was his versatility. Letianxiannong, in a 1925 review of Zheng's career, gave particular praise to his performance in Orphan Rescues Grandfather, claiming that "all the moods of joy, anger, and sorrow are true to life. Every action is very similar to a spirited old man". Zeng was also acclaimed for his "heroic" performance in Jade Pear Spirit and his villainous turn in Love and Vanity. As journalists debated the tendency for spoken-word dramatists – who made up the majority of China's early actors – to overact, Zheng was presented as an example of one stage actor who had adapted well to the specific needs of the film industry. In a 1925 Shen Bao article, the reviewer Qiyu praised Zheng as the greatest of China's male actors, writing that he was the only one who had "removed the mask of new plays, while the others remain not very good".

Critics noted Zheng's proclivity for comedy during his stage days, one writing in Xibao in 1918 that he was "witty but not frivolous and gimmicky, but not exploitative [with a] refined difference from those who just want to mess around." Such comedic stylings continued into his early films, which featured a variety of gags. For example, Zheng's chef character in Havoc in a Bizarre Theatre is a fan of cinematic comedy who distractedly serves live animals to patrons then, when fired, replaces a sugar thief's prize with gravel. At the same time, criticism of Zheng's performances focused primarily on his early comic roles, the contemporary critic Tang Bihua noting a tendency towards pretentiousness.

Labourer's Love is the earliest work of Chinese cinema to survive in its entirety, and consequently it has become the primary source on early Chinese comedy; it is also the only work in Zheng's oeuvre known to have survived. Reviewing it, the film scholar Jia Binwu notes that Zheng had a much more naturalistic approach than his co-star Zheng Zhengqiu. Jia characterizes the performance as "rough", but also finds it displays careful consideration of the appropriate expressions when showing affection, proposing marriage, and challenging wrongdoers. The sinologist Christopher Rea notes that the film seems to deliberately draw from Harold Lloyd's "Glasses" character, who was popular in contemporary China. Zheng's character puts on comically strong spectacles and converses with his beloved through a connection device similar to that featured in Never Weaken (1921). The character also made allusions to Buster Keaton; the film historian Dong Xinyu likened his pushing of a street thug into hot water to a gag in The Haunted House (1921).

== Filmography ==
- The King of Comedy Visits Shanghai (滑稽大王遊滬記, 1922)
- Labourer's Love (勞工之愛情, 1922)
- Good Elder Brother (好兄弟, 1922)
- Zhang Xinsheng (張欣生, 1922)
- Havoc in a Bizarre Theatre (大鬧怪戲場, 1923)

- Orphan Rescues Grandfather (孤兒救祖記, 1923)
- Jade Pear Spirit (玉梨魂, 1924)
- The Poor Children (苦兒弱女, 1924)
- Love and Vanity (誘婚, 1924)
- The Last Conscience (最後之良心, 1925, unfinished)

== Works cited ==
- Chen Jingliang (陳景亮), Zou Jianwen (鄒建文) (2005). 百年中国电影精选 [A Century of Chinese Film Selections] (in Chinese). Vol. 1. Beijing: China Social Sciences Press. ISBN 978-7-5004-5250-8.
- China Film Art Research Center; China Film Archive (1996). 中国影片大典: 故事片, 戏曲片, 1905–1930 [Encyclopaedia of Chinese Films: Feature Films, Opera Films, 1905–1930] (in Chinese). Beijing: China Film Publishing House. ISBN 978-7-106-01095-9.
- Ding, Yaping (2021). General History of Chinese Film I: 1896–1949. Translated by Jin, Haina. London and New York: Routledge. doi:10.4324/9781003204695. ISBN 978-1-000-43485-9.
- Huang, Xuelei (2014). Shanghai Filmmaking: Crossing Borders, Connecting to the Globe, 1922–1938. Leiden: Brill. ISBN 978-90-04-27933-9.
- Huang, Xuelei (2022). "Beyond Labourer's Love: Rethinking Early Chinese Film Comedy". Journal of Chinese Film Studies. 2 (2): 277–297. doi:10.1515/jcfs-2022-0024.
- Jia, Binwu (2022). "Zheng Zhegu and Performances in Early Chinese Film". Journal of Chinese Film Studies. 2 (2): 261–276. doi:10.1515/jcfs-2022-0002.
- Jiang Zhen (姜贞) (2009). 周剑云:中国电影业的儒商 [Zhou Jianyun: A Confucian Businessman in China's Film Industry]. Film and Art (in Chinese): 139–145.
- Rea, Christopher (2021). Chinese Film Classics, 1922–1949. New York: Columbia University Press. ISBN 978-0-231-18813-5. JSTOR 10.7312/rea-18812.
- Wang Guangxi (王广西) (1998). 中国近现代文学艺术辞典 [Dictionary of Modern Chinese Literature and Art] (in Chinese). Henan: Zhongzhou Ancient Books Publishing House. ISBN 978-7-5348-0971-2.
- Xu, Xiaoqun (2000). Chinese Professionals and the Republican State: The Rise of Professional Associations in Shanghai, 1912–1937. Cambridge, United Kingdom: Cambridge University Press. ISBN 978-1-139-43184-2.
- Zhang Wei (張偉) (2009). 談影小集——中國現代影壇的塵封一隅 [A Collection of Shorts about Movies—A Dusty Corner of China's Modern Film World] (in Chinese). Taipei: Showway Publishing. ISBN 978-986-221-308-7.
- Zhang, Zhen (2005). An Amorous History of the Silver Screen: Shanghai Cinema, 1896–1937. Chicago: University of Chicago Press. ISBN 978-0-226-98238-0.
