= The King of Comedy Visits Shanghai =

1922 Chinese silent film

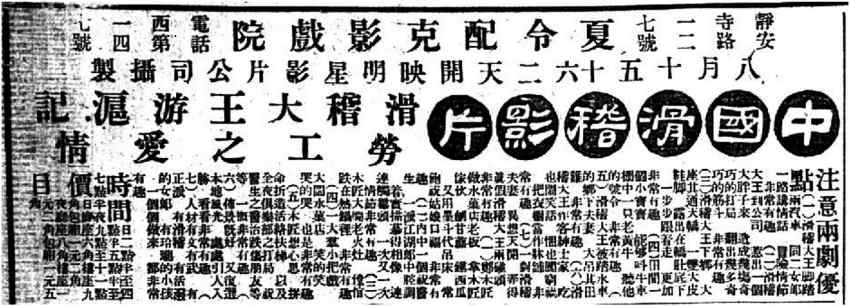
- Newspaper advertisement
- Traditional Chinese: 滑稽大王遊滬記
- Simplified Chinese: 滑稽大王游沪记
Transcriptions
Standard Mandarin
- Hanyu Pinyin: Huájī dàwáng yóu hù jì
- Wade–Giles: Hua^{2}chi^{1} ta^{4}wang^{2} yu^{2} hu^{4} chi^{4}
- Directed by: Zhang Shichuan
- Screenplay by: Zheng Zhengqiu
- Starring: Richard Bell; Zheng Zhegu; Zheng Zhengqiu; Wang Xianzhai
- Production company: Mingxing Film Company
- Release date: 5 October 1922
- Country: Republic of China
- Language: Silent

The King of Comedy Visits Shanghai (simplified Chinese: 滑稽大王游沪记; traditional Chinese: 滑稽大王遊滬記; pinyin: Huájī dàwáng yóu hù jì), also known as The King of Comedy Visits China, is a 1922 slapstick comedy directed by Zhang Shichuan for the Mingxing Film Company. Depicting a fictional visit by Charlie Chaplin to Shanghai, the film starred Richard Bell in the titular role and drew from Chaplin's popularity in the Republic of China. Released as a double feature with Labourer's Love, the film screened for four days at the Olympic Theatre but did not find broader distribution. It is a lost film.

== Premise ==
Charlie Chaplin arrives in Shanghai. Hijinks ensue.

== Production ==
The King of Comedy Visits Shanghai was the first film produced by the Mingxing Film Company, which had been established in early 1922 by Ren Jinping, Zhang Shichuan, Zheng Zhegu, Zheng Zhengqiu, and Zhou Jianyun. Growing out of the Mutual Stock and Produce Exchange Company, which collapsed in 1921, the company had initially attempted fundraising efforts but ultimately relied on its founders for start-up capital. The film drew from the success of Charlie Chaplin in the Republic of China. Between 1919 and 1924, some nineteen Charlie Chaplin films were screened in the country. These works had resonated with audiences, and Chaplin's The Tramp character – including his bowler hat, suit, and cane – had wide recognition.

Zhang Shichuan directed The King of Comedy Visits Shanghai based on a screenplay by Zheng Zhengqiu. The cast included Richard Bell, a Charlie Chaplin impersonator active in contemporary Shanghai, as well Zheng Zhengqiu and Wang Xianzhai. Mingxing co-founder Zheng Zhegu appeared in his first film role. The Mingxing studios and its film school featured extensively, with an executive being selected as the fictional Chaplin's tour guide and showcasing the company's offerings. The company was also depicted as hosting a banquet for him. Such self-referential offerings were noted by the Chinese film historian Zheng Junli as likely drawn from Mack Sennett and his work with Keystone Studios in the 1910s.

The King of Comedy Visits Shanghai was a slapstick comedy that emulated Chaplin's comic stylings. Contemporary advertising material indicated that it contained various gags. Several involved the main character, who flirted with two women while astride their automobiles, engaged in acrobatic fights, and became trapped in a sedan chair and later a waterwheel. Other comedic scenes included a baby driving an oxcart in a field and an encounter between the real and fake kings of comedy. These scenes, taken in conjunction, suggest a theme of the Chaplin character "going native", and alluded to prominent features of Chaplin's Hollywood productions.

== Release and reception ==
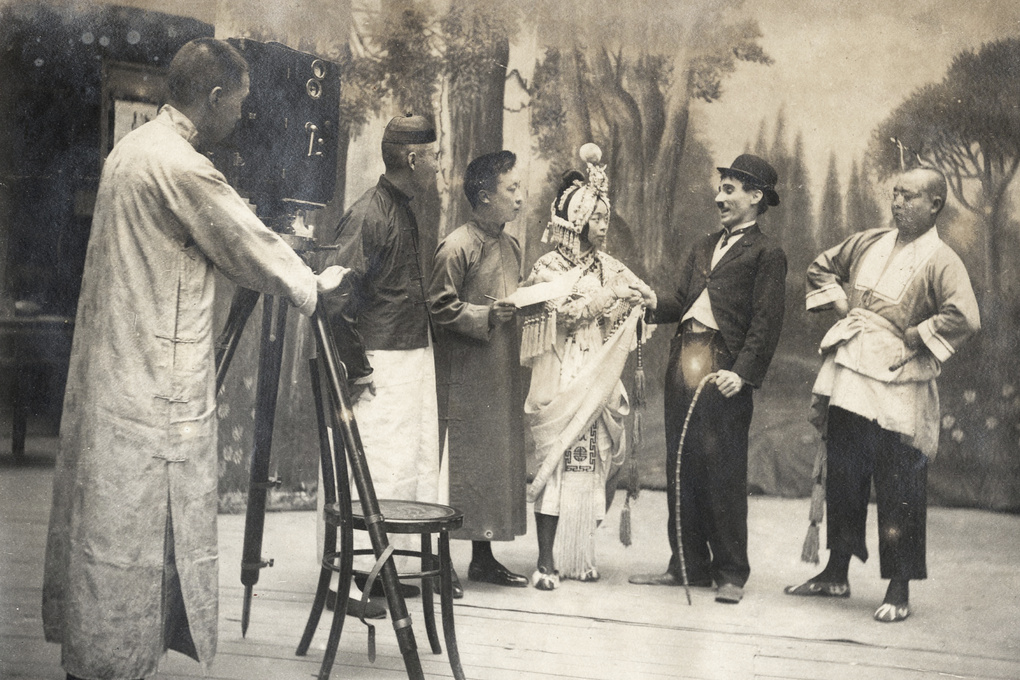
Production of The King of Comedy Visits Shanghai

Beginning on 3 October 1923, Mingxing advertised The King of Comedy Visits Shanghai as a double feature together with its Labourer's Love (1922). The films premiered simultaneously at the Olympic Theatre two days later. Initially scheduled for a two-day run, with three showings per day, the screening was extended to four days, suggesting some popularity with audiences. However, the film was not optioned by other cinemas. It was three reels in length.

The King of Comedy Visits Shanghai and Labourer's Love were two of the twenty-four comedy films produced in China before 1923; the genre represented almost half of contemporary filmic production. The film is now considered lost, though Labourer's Love has survived. Chaplin ultimately visited Shanghai in 1936, at which time Mingxing hosted a banquet for him at the International Hotel, with starlet Hu Die presiding.

== Works cited ==
- Huang, Xuelei (2014). Shanghai Filmmaking: Crossing Borders, Connecting to the Globe, 1922–1938. Leiden: Brill. doi:10.1163/9789004279346. ISBN 978-90-04-27933-9.
- Huang, Xuelei (2022). "Beyond Labourer's Love: Rethinking Early Chinese Film Comedy". Journal of Chinese Film Studies. 2 (2): 277–297. doi:10.1515/jcfs-2022-0024. hdl:20.500.11820/76168f29-f931-4b31-bc4a-50b34ceb99e7.
- Hulme, Alison (2014). "A Tale of Two Cinemas: Embracing and Rejecting Hollywood's Influence in 1930s Shanghai". In Funnell, Lisa; Yip, Man-Fung (eds.). American and Chinese-Language Cinemas: Examining Cultural Flows. London and New York: Routledge. pp. 24–38. ISBN 978-1-317-91025-1.
- Jia, Binwu (2022). "Zheng Zhegu and Performances in Early Chinese Film". Journal of Chinese Film Studies. 2 (2): 261–276. doi:10.1515/jcfs-2022-0002.
- Kelly, Ned (8 March 2016). "This Day in History: When Charlie Chaplin Came to China". That's Shanghai. Archived from the original on 13 March 2016.
- Leyda, Jay (1972). Dianying: An Account of Films and the Film Audience in China. Cambridge: MIT Press. ISBN 978-0-262-12046-3.
- Luo, Ting (2024). "From Self-Promotion to Demystification: Self-Reflexivity and Realism in Chinese Cinema". Journal of Film and Video. 76 (4): 5–18. doi:10.5406/19346018.76.4.02.
- Xiao, Zhiwei (2010). "A Century of America on Chinese Screens". The Journal of American-East Asian Relations. 17 (4): 305–323. doi:10.1163/187656111X566007. JSTOR 23613193.
