= Revenge of an Actress =

1929 Chinese silent film by Bu Wancang and Wang Hanlun

- Traditional Chinese: 女伶復仇記
- Simplified Chinese: 女伶复仇记
- Literal meaning: Record of an Actress's Revenge
Transcriptions
Standard Mandarin
- Hanyu Pinyin: Nǚlíng Fùchóu Jì
- Directed by: Bu Wancang; Wang Hanlun
- Screenplay by: Bao Tianxiao
- Produced by: Wang Hanlun
- Starring: Wang Hanlun; Gao Zhanfei; Fei Boqing; Cai Chusheng
- Cinematography: Liang Linguang
- Edited by: Wang Hanlun
- Production company: Hanlun Film Company
- Release date: 1929 (China)
- Country: China
- Language: Silent

Revenge of an Actress (traditional Chinese: 女伶復仇記; simplified Chinese: 女伶复仇记; pinyin: Nǚlíng fùchóu jì) is a 1929 Chinese silent film. It follows a love triangle between two students and an actress, whereby she seeks revenge for her lover being blinded by her scorned suitor. Initially directed by Bu Wancang, directing was taken over by star Wang Hanlun when Bu proved unreliable; production and editing was also handled by Wang through her Hanlun Film Company. The film was reportedly a commercial success, allowing Wang to retire from the film industry.

== Plot ==
Two students, Long and Yu, have fallen in love with the actress Youlan. She falls in love with Yu, spurning Long, who blinds his former friend in a fit of rage. Youlan seeks to avenge her beloved, but dies with her vengeance unfulfilled.

== Production ==
Having begun her career with Orphan Rescues Grandfather in 1923 and established a reputation as a tragedienne, the actress Wang Hanlun had failed to receive her salary when working for Shanghai's dominant Mingxing and Tianyi film companies. Frustrated by the situation, as well as what she perceived to be an exploitive time in Singapore, Wang decided to produce one final film before retiring. She thus established the Hanlun Film Company, renting space in a building owned by Minxin. As her logo, she used an image of a cat, imitating the lion used by Metro-Goldwyn-Mayer.

Wang purchased a screenplay, then titled Blind Love, from the dramatist Bao Tianxiao for 800 yuan (equivalent to ¥76,000 in 2019). She hired Bu Wancang to handle directing, but after he proved unreliable and spent much of his time gambling on horses, Wang decided to finish the film, now titled Revenge of an Actress, herself. Further setbacks emerged when Minxin reclaimed its office space, requiring Wang to finish filming – with the assistance of Cai Chusheng – at her home. She therefore became one of China's earliest women directors, preceded by Xie Caizhen (An Orphan's Cry, 1925) and Yang Naimei (A Wondrous Woman, 1928).

Once principal photography was completed, Wang edited Revenge of an Actress herself. After purchasing a projector, she spent forty days at home, playing and cutting the film bit by bit until she achieved the finished product. Thematically, the film was a family melodrama, drawing heavily from the Mandarin Ducks and Butterflies school of literature. It starred Wang as the titular actress, with other roles filled by Gao Zhanfei, Fei Boqing, and Cai Chusheng.

== Release and reception ==
Revenge of an Actress was released in 1929, going on tour across China with stops that included Suzhou, Beijing, and Wuxi. During the intermission, Wang would stand on stage and speak with audience members, obtaining feedback. The film was reportedly a commercial success, allowing Wang to leave the film industry. She used part of the profits to finalize her divorce from her estranged husband, with other profits being used to study cosmetology. In 1930, she opened the Hanlun Beauty Salon in Shanghai.
