= Wang Hanlun =

Chinese actress (1903–1978)

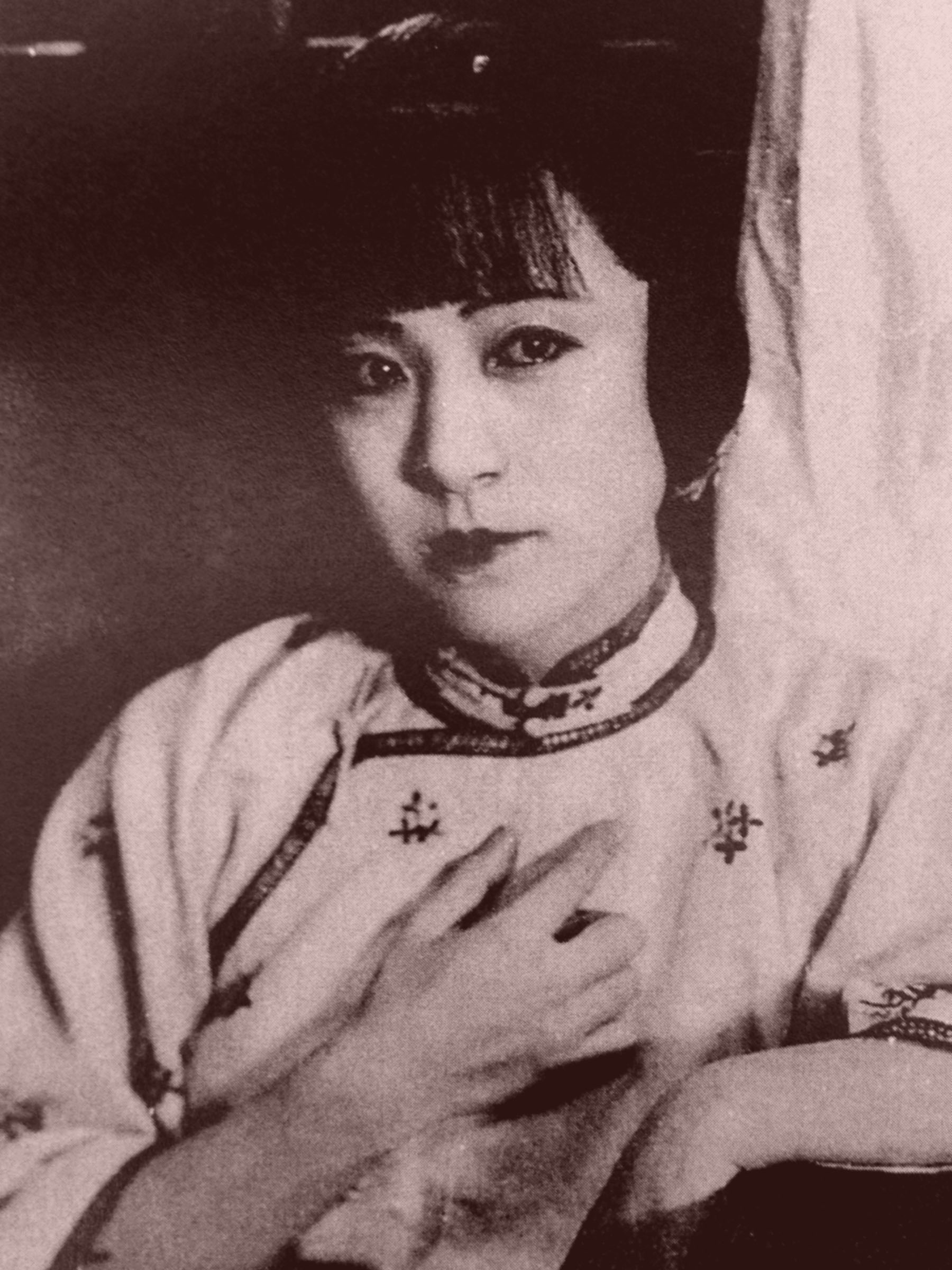
- Wang in The World Against Her (1924)
- Born: Peng Jianqing (彭劍青); 1903; Suzhou, Jiangsu, Qing China
- Died: 17 August 1978 (aged 74–75); Shanghai, China
- Other name: Helen Wang
- Occupations: Actress; beautician
- Years active: 1923–1929, 1950–1958

Chinese name
- Traditional Chinese: 王漢倫
- Simplified Chinese: 王汉伦
Transcriptions
Standard Mandarin
- Hanyu Pinyin: Wáng Hànlún
- Wade–Giles: Wang^{2} Han^{4}lun^{2}
- IPA: [wǎŋ xânlwə̌n]

Peng Jianqing
- Traditional Chinese: 彭劍青
- Simplified Chinese: 彭剑青
Transcriptions
Standard Mandarin
- Hanyu Pinyin: Péng Jiànqīng
- Wade–Giles: P'eng^{2} Chien^{4}-ch'ing^{1}

Wang Hanlun (traditional Chinese: 王漢倫; simplified Chinese: 王汉伦; pinyin: Wáng Hànlún, 1903 – 17 August 1978), also known as Helen Wang, was a Chinese actress active primarily between 1923 and 1930. Born to a wealthy family from Suzhou, Anhui, she travelled to Shanghai to attend St Mary's Hall. After a short and unhappy arranged marriage that brought her to Fengtian, she returned to Shanghai where she was discovered in 1922 by Zhang Shichuan of the Mingxing Film Company. Abandoning her birth name Peng Jianqing and severing ties with her disapproving family, she found critical acclaim with her debut film Orphan Rescues Grandfather (1923) and became China's first female film star.

Known primarily for her tragic roles, Wang completed films for companies such as Mingxing, Tianyi, and Great Wall. She became a fashion icon, representing modernity for film audiences while simultaneously promoting a spirit of independence. At the same time, she was frequently frustrated by their failure to pay her salary. In 1929, she appeared in, co-directed, produced, and edited Revenge of an Actress, which she intended to be her final film. Retiring from cinema, she opened her own beauty salon in Shanghai, operating it until the Japanese occupation in 1937. In her final years, Wang took smaller parts for the Shanghai Film Studio.

== Biography ==
=== Early life ===
Wang was born Peng Jianqing (彭劍青; Péng Jiànqīng) in Suzhou, Anhui, in 1903. The daughter of a wealthy family, she moved to Shanghai with her family in 1916 to enrol at St Mary's Hall. There, she studied English, music, and Western literature. She also began using the name Helen.

Wang's parents died before she could complete her schooling, and the sixteen-year-old was thus entrusted to her eldest brother. He arranged for her to marry a miner, whom she had never met, in Fengtian (now Shenyang). This marriage was short-lived, and Wang – frustrated with her husband's debauchery – made her way back to Shanghai. Unable to live with her brother, she was taken in by a godmother. At first working as a teacher, she later found employment as a typist.

=== Film career ===
In 1922, Wang travelled to the studios of the Mingxing Film Company to observe the making of Labourer's Love. There, she was discovered by the director Zhang Shichuan, who perceived her as embodying a modern fashion sense and elegance. Wang, seeking "to find a different path, to do something on a grand scale", agreed to join the company. To facilitate her film appearance, she adopted the stage name Wang Hanlun. The family name, Wang, was chosen due to its resemblance to the stripes on a tiger's forehead, while the given name Hanlun was the Chinese rendering of Helen. This pseudonym also allowed her to distance herself from her estranged husband. Wang's family was not supportive of her decision to enter film, with her brother proclaiming that she had disgraced their ancestors, and thus she cut ties with her family.

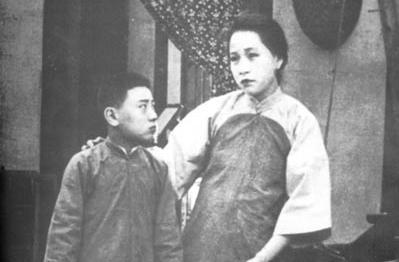
Wang (right) with Zheng Xiaoqiu in Orphan Rescues Grandfather (1923)

Wang's first film with Mingxing was Orphan Rescues Grandfather (1923), a melodrama about a young widow spurned by her father-in-law after being baselessly accused of adultery. Wang played the widow, Yu Weiyu, with Zheng Xiaoqiu as the titular orphan. Made while Mingxing was at the brink of insolvency, Orphan Rescues Grandfather was a commercial and critical success, saving the company and launching Wang's career as China's first female film star. (Note: Chang (1999, p. 132) notes that earlier Chinese actresses were generally amateurs who were credited under pseudonyms. Another early film star, Yang Naimei, gained prominence in 1924.) She made two further films with Mingxing, Jade Pear Spirit and The Poor Children, the following year, again playing young widows.

Despite Mingxing's success, Wang failed to receive the promised salary. She thus left for its competitor, the Great Wall Film Company, receiving her first billing – for The World Against Her – in 1924. Portraying Zhiruo, a young woman forced to eke a living after being disowned by an unfaithful husband, Wang received critical acclaim along with her co-star Pu Shunqing. The World Against Her was a commercial success, and Wang produced two further films with Great Wall in 1925: Star-Plucking Girl and The Person in the Boudoir Dream. However, Wang again received no remuneration, and she won a lawsuit against Great Wall for failure to pay her salary. Through 1926 and 1927 she appeared in several films, working with Mingxing and the Tianyi Film Company, but faced further exploitation; not only were payments still irregular, but a Tianyi employee opened Wang's private mail. After eight months in Singapore in 1927, during which she felt humiliated after being made to sign autographs for paying customers, she decided to leave the film industry after one more film.

Rather than rely on existing film studios, Wang decided to produce her own film. Purchasing a screenplay from Bao Tianxiao, she rented space at the Minxin Film Company and began working on what would become Revenge of an Actress (1929). Production was troubled. When her first pick for director, Bu Wancang, focused more on horse racing than the production, Wang took a directorial role alongside Cai Chusheng. Later, after Minxin reclaimed its office space, Wang handled filming and editing at home. In her memoir, Wang wrote "I played the film bit by bit at home, and cut it bit by bit. After forty days of hard work, I finally succeeded". She brought Revenge of an Actress on tour to great commercial success, performing live during the intermission and receiving audience feedback.

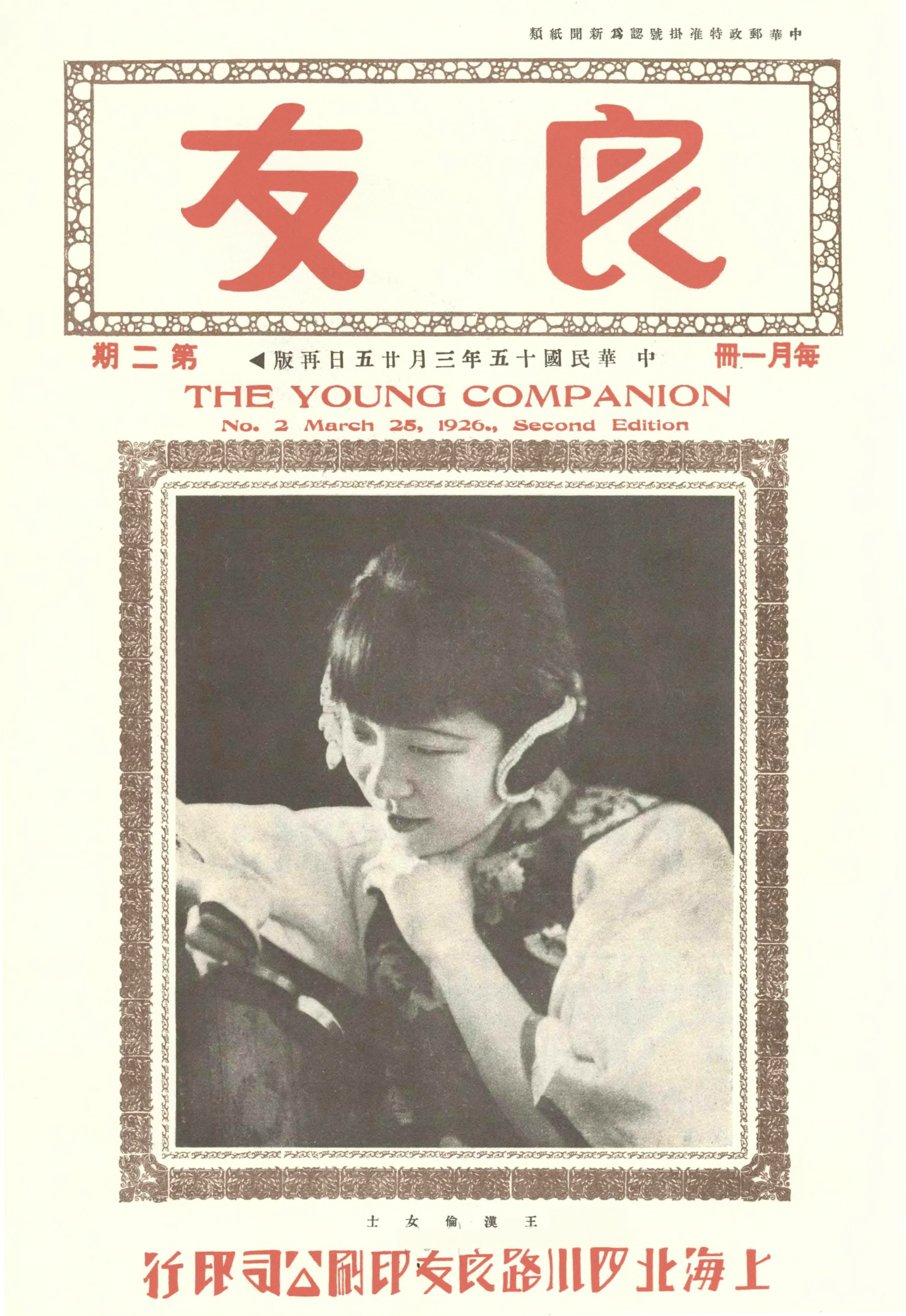
Wang on the cover of The Young Companion, 1926

=== Later years and death ===
Wang used some of the profits from Revenge of an Actress to finalize her divorce, then left the film industry. After receiving lessons from a cosmetician, she opened the Hanlun Beauty Parlour in Shanghai. Her first customer was Hu Die, with whom she had appeared in The Movie Actresses. The beauty salon was a popular destination in Shanghai and remained open until the 1937, when it was closed in the face of the Japanese occupation.

By the 1950s, Wang was employed with the Shanghai Film Studio. She appeared in three films for the company, including as the mother of the title character in The Life of Wu Xun (1950). She also published a memoir, titled Memories of the Film Studio (影场回忆录). She died in Shanghai on 17 August 1978.

== Analysis ==
Press coverage of Wang highlighted her status as a modern woman, one who showed her unbound feet on camera and who was willing to have her hair cut on screen. She was also noted as fluent in Mandarin Chinese, Shanghainese, and English, which contributed to her presentation as a modern woman. As with other early Chinese film stars, Wang embraced the modern mass media, which was generally shunned by society's elites; at the same time, she attempted to cultivate face-to-face interactions with her fans. She also generated further fame through tours, performing kunqu before live audiences. At the peak of her career, Wang was considered a trend-setter, with clothes that she and her fellow film stars wore becoming popular among the general populace.

Although Wang was often known for her tragic roles, being known as "the leading Chinese actress for tragedy" she also frequently depicted independent women. The film scholar Chen Jianhua describes her character Yu Weiyu in Orphan Rescues Grandfather as "a new domestic subject, a self-assertive woman who was economically independent and taking the responsibility of educating the younger generation". The character Zhiruo was similarly portrayed as an independent woman, failing in her efforts to live and thrive not due to her own shortcomings but because she is exploited by men; Wang later described this as her favourite role. In a 1925 article in Cinema Magazine, she wrote:

I like women to have an independent spirit, and by "independent" I mean self-supporting. In order to achieve this, a woman needs to find a proper job; otherwise the talk of independence is an empty one. Before I was independent, I had suffered a lot in my own family and felt life was rather meaningless.

== Filmography ==
Wang appeared in thirteen films as an actress. She also served as producer, co-director, and editor on one film, Revenge of An Actress. This list is derived from the Women Film Pioneers Project.

- Orphan Rescues Grandfather (孤兒救祖記, 1923)
- Jade Pear Spirit (玉梨魂, 1924)
- The Poor Children (苦兒弱女, 1924)
- The World Against Her (棄婦, 1924)
- Star-Plucking Girl (摘星之女, 1925)
- The Person in the Boudoir Dream (春閨夢裏人, 1925)
- Child Labourer (一個小工人, 1926)
- The Movie Actresses (電影女明星, 1926)
- A Virtuous Buddhist Daughter-in-Law (空門賢媳, 1927)
- Revenge of an Actress (女伶復仇記, 1929)
- The Life of Wu Xun (武訓轉, 1950)
- The Legend of Lu Ban (魯班的傳説, 1958)
- A Great Upsurge (热浪奔腾, 1958)

== Works cited ==
- Chang, Michael (1999). "The Good, the Bad, & the Beautiful: Movie Actresses & Public Discourse in Shanghai, 1920s-1930s". In Zhang, Yingjin (ed.). Cinema and Urban Culture in Shanghai, 1922–1943. Redwood City, California: Stanford University Press. pp. 128–159. ISBN 978-0-8047-3572-8.
- Chen, Jianhua (2013). "D.W. Griffith and the Rise of Chinese Cinema in Early 1920s Shanghai". In Rojas, Carlos; Chow, Eileen (eds.). The Oxford Handbook of Chinese Cinema. Oxford: Oxford University Press. pp. 23–38. doi:10.1093/oxfordhb/9780199765607.013.0002. ISBN 978-0-19-976560-7.
- Jin Qi'an (金其安) (2009). 中国早期电影事业的开拓者周剑云 [Zhou Jianyun, The Pioneer of China's Early Film Industry]. Jianghuai Literature and History (in Chinese) (2): 133–141.
- Wei, S. Louisa (2017). Gaines, Jane; Vatsal, Radha; Dall’Asta, Monica (eds.). "Helen Wang". Women Film Pioneers Project. Columbia University Libraries. doi:10.7916/d8-zc8b-7c47.
- Yu, Sabrina Qiong (2012). "Vulnerable Chinese Stars: From Xizi to Film Worker". In Zhang, Yingjin (ed.). A Companion to Chinese Cinema. Hoboken: Blackwell Publishing. pp. 218–238. doi:10.1002/9781444355994.ch12. ISBN 978-1-4443-3029-8.
- Zhang, Zhen (2005). An Amorous History of the Silver Screen: Shanghai Cinema, 1896–1937. Chicago: University of Chicago Press. ISBN 978-0-226-98238-0.
- Zhao Xiaoqing (赵小青) (20 January 2022). 王汉伦 [Wang Hanlun]. Encyclopaedia of China (in Chinese) (3rd ed.).
