= Ren Jinping =

Chinese businessman and filmmaker

- Occupations: Entrepreneur, filmmaker
- Years active: 1910s–1928

Chinese name
- Chinese: 任矜萍
Transcriptions
Standard Mandarin
- Hanyu Pinyin: Rén Jīnpíng
- Wade–Giles: Jen^{4} Chin^{1}p`ing^{2}

Ren Jinping (Chinese: 任矜萍; pinyin: Rén Jīnpíng) was a Chinese businessman and filmmaker. Active in journalism from the mid-1910s, Ren joined Zhang Shichuan, Zheng Zhegu, Zheng Zhengqiu, and Zhou Jianyun in establishing the Mingxing Film Company in 1922. He handled much of the company's advertising, while also directing a film in 1925. Ren established his own company, Xinren, in 1926 and directed several films for it. Xinren closed in 1928. By 1949, Ren was a theatre manager. Little information about him has survived, and he has generally received little discussion in studies of Chinese cinema.

== Biography ==
=== Early life ===
The cinema scholar Yoshino Sugawara writes that Ren's date of birth is unknown, while the film historian Huang Xuelei provides a year of birth of 1896. Ren traced his heritage to the Zhejiang region, and others of Ningbo heritage remained in his business networks through the 1920s. Ren attended the Minli Junior High School in the late 1900s, finishing his studies at the beginning of the following decade. By the 1910s he was in Shanghai, variously serving as the dean of the Minsheng School for Girls (from 1918) and as head of advertising at the Shangbao newspaper. Schools such as Minsheng would often be used for the screening of contemporary film productions, and Ren had been a fan of cinema since his youth.

Ren wrote extensively in the news media during the May Fourth Movement, espousing the ideals of the Shanghai Student Union, and working with its bulletin. He established a branch at the Minsheng School, and further promoted the movement's ideals through a series of lectures, using lantern slides of photographs and newspaper articles to supplement his message. These activities would have brought him into contact with various members of Shanghai's cultural sphere, including many who later entered the film industry.

Ren later entered the publication industry, establishing the Chen Company; its Film Magazine was influential in early cinematic discourses in China; Sugawara positions it as a continuation of the Chinese Cinema Study Society's The Motion Picture Review, one of the country's earliest film magazines. He was also a prominent member of the Eternal Memory Society, a club for fans of Peking opera, and penned several reviews of contemporary drama productions. In 1921 he worked at a stock brokerage owned by Zhang Shichuan; he also organized a fundraising campaign to help save the YMCA-run Qinye Compulsory School. The tabloid The Crystal included Ren in a list of the city's hundred most famous people in a March 1922 edition.

=== Mingxing ===
In 1922, Ren cofounded the Mingxing Film Company together with Zhang Shichuan, Zheng Zhegu, Zheng Zhengqiu, and Zhou Jianyun. Each had been associated with the brokerage, and each contributed 10,000 yuan (equivalent to ¥1,052,000 in 2019) in start-up capital for the company. Ren had previously known Zheng Zhegu and Zhou Jianyun through the Eternal Memory Society. However, unlike the other founders – collectively known as the five tigers of Mingxing – he had never been active in producing early spoken-word dramas.

Ren used his publication house to advertise Mingxing, and after the success of Orphan Rescues Grandfather (1924) arranged for investments from prominent local businessmen, including Fang Jiaobo, Lao Jingxiu, and Yuan Ludeng. Ren's networks remained important for Mingxing through the middle of the decade. When the company's 1923 crime film Zhang Xinsheng faced criticism and censorship for "disturb[ing] social order" and "damag[ing] social mores", Ren reframed the film's violence as part of an educational message; the censorship committee agreed that the film had some educational merit, as it showed the perpetrator being punished. He also made similar claims about Mingxing's comedy films, positioning them as focusing on improving society.

In 1925, Ren directed his only film for Mingxing: A New Family. The eleven-reel film, written by Gu Kenfu and starring Zhang Zhiyun and Yang Naimei, debuted at the Carlton Theatre on 4 January 1926. The Japanese author Jun'ichirō Tanizaki, who viewed the film upon Ren's invitation during a visit to China, described A New Family as comparable to Japanese productions in its acting, direction, and editing, though lacking in cinematography and lighting. When asked why he had decided to focus on Western, rather than traditionally Chinese, issues, Ren responded, "It can't be helped; it's business."

=== Later years ===
Ren left Mingxing in 1926, having been disappointed by the company's distribution of A New Family. He established his own film company, Xinren, that year, with the support of Cheng Bugao, Chen Shouyin, and his brother Ren Xifan. Financial support came from Fang Jiaobo and Yuan Ludeng. In 1927, Ren and Cheng Bugao represented Xinren in the Shanghai Film Guild. The company also established networks through China and Southeast Asia. Initially fiercely competitive with Mingxing, the two companies later established an agreement that allowed Xinren's films to be shown at the latter's theatres.

Ren directed two films based on scripts by Bao Tianxiao for the company, An Amorous Wife (1927) and An Amorous Man (1928). He also produced the film Three Women, which explored the experiences of three women of different backgrounds in Shanghai; it extensively featured elements considered "modern" by contemporary viewers, including products made in the United States. Other films produced by Xinren included The Battle of Fang Shiyu, The Two Heroes of the Gan Family, and Little Knight (all 1928). Several of these films were in the popular wuxia genre and starred Ren's son Chaojun. The company closed in 1928, around the time Ren Xifan established his own company. Newspaper reports indicate that Ren was active as a theatre manager in Shanghai in 1948, and that he attended a 1949 memorial service for the film director Fang Pei-Lin.

== Legacy ==
Sugawara describes Ren as one of early Chinese cinema's most important figures. However, he is rarely discussed in detail in histories of the industry, receiving only a brief mention in a 1934 retrospective. Little information about Ren remains; there are no surviving portraits of him, and his date of death is unknown. Ren's film A New Family has survived at the China Film Archive.

== Works cited ==
- Huang, Xuelei (2014). Shanghai Filmmaking: Crossing Borders, Connecting to the Globe, 1922–1938. Leiden: Brill. ISBN 978-90-04-27933-9.
- Nakajima, Seio (2021). "Studies of Chinese Cinema in Japan". Journal of Chinese Film Studies. 1: 167–186. doi:10.1515/jcfs-2021-0001.
- Sugawara, Yoshino (2015). 映画史から忘却された「儒商」、任矜蘋―教育者、愛国者、映画監督 [Ren Jinping, the Forgotten Confucian Merchant from Film History: Educator, Patriot and Filmmaker]. Yasō (in Japanese). 95: 21–49.
- Sugawara, Yoshino (2022). "From Teahouse to Classroom: Educational Screen Practice in Republican Shanghai". Journal of Chinese Cinemas. 16: 9–24. doi:10.1080/17508061.2022.2120750.
- Yeh, Emilie Yueh-yu; Tam, Enoch Yee-lok (2018). "Forming the Movie Field: Film Literati in Republican China". In Yeh, Emilie Yueh-yu (ed.). Early Film Culture in Hong Kong, Taiwan, and Republican China: Kaleidoscopic Histories. University of Michigan Press. pp. 244–276. doi:10.1353/book.57846. ISBN 978-0-472-12344-5.
- Zhang, Yingjin (1998). "Censorship and Film". In Zhang, Yingjin; Xiao, Zhiwei (eds.). Encyclopedia of Chinese Film. New York, London: Routledge. pp. 109–110. ISBN 978-0-415-15168-9.
- Zhu, Chaoya (2023). "The Politics of Industry and the Wave of Nationalism: Exploring the Shanghai Film Guild, 1927–1930". Historical Journal of Film, Radio and Television. 43 (4): 1095–1114. doi:10.1080/01439685.2023.2218181.
