= Emancipation Pictorial =

Chinese women's magazine (1920–1922)

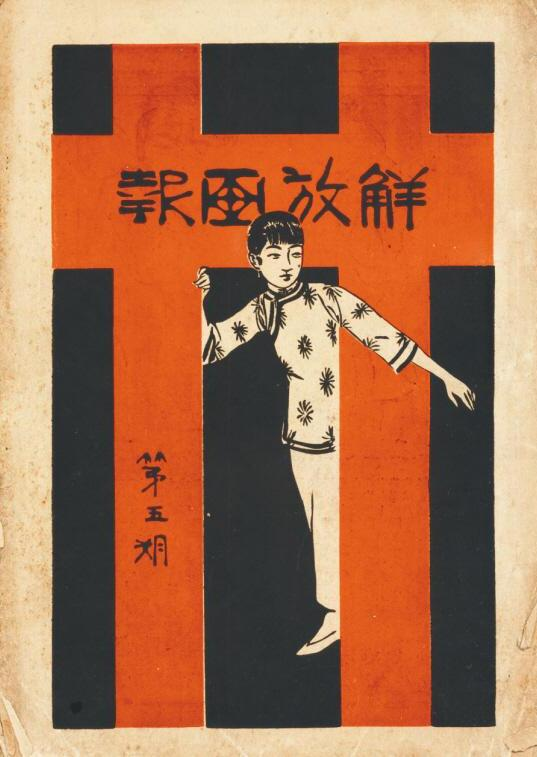
- Fifth issue, July 1920
- Native name
- Traditional Chinese: 觧放𤰱報
- Simplified Chinese: 解放画报
Transcriptions
Standard Mandarin
- Hanyu Pinyin: Jiěfàng Huàbào
- Wade–Giles: Chieh^{3}fang^{4} Hua^{4}pao^{4}
- Editor: Zhou Jianyun
- Categories: Women's issues
- Frequency: Monthly
- First issue: 4 May 1920; 106 years ago
- Final issue: c. 1922
- Country: China
- Based in: Shanghai
- Language: Written vernacular Chinese

The Emancipation Pictorial (simplified Chinese: 解放画报; traditional Chinese: 觧放𤰱報; pinyin: Jiěfàng Huàbào), also known as the Liberation Pictorial, was a women's magazine published in the Republic of China. Established by the Xinmin Library, it was first published on 4 May 1920 and is known to have lasted for eighteen issues; the preface to the last edition indicated a plan to rejuvenate the magazine, though no continuation has been identified.

Articles, mostly produced by men, dealt with topics of interest to contemporary women readers such as breast binding and marriage. The Emancipation Pictorial advocated for equal rights for men and women, though it did not embrace the women's rights movement and rejected women's participation in the contemporary political situation. Imagery ranged from the realistic to the surreal, and generally explored how women had suffered, emancipation could occur, and emancipation was realized in contemporary China.

== Publication ==
The Emancipation Pictorial was one of several magazines established following the May Fourth Movement to deal primarily with women's issues; others included The New Woman (新妇女) and Women's Review (妇女评论). It was published by the Xinmin Library, which had been co-founded by Zheng Zhegu, Zheng Zhengqiu, and Zhou Jianyun; also published by Xinmin was the magazine Yaofeng Monthly and the newspaper Spring Voice Daily.

The first issue of the Emancipation Pictorial was published on 4 May 1920, the first anniversary of the May Fourth Movement, which the magazine supported. Explaining the rationale behind the establishment of the Emancipation Pictorial, editor Zhou Jianyun wrote in the first issue:

Eight years since the founding of the Republic of China, though the name has changed, the content remains the same; though the emperor has been removed, the people are still slaves; though global trends are calling, the Chinese people's thinking has not changed. ... [Out of love for country, this magazine] seeks to tear off all constraints, promote liberation, and then bring about some transformation. (Note: Original: ｢民国建国八年，招牌虽换，内容依然是陈 陈相因；皇帝虽除，人民依然是奴隶根性；世界潮流虽急，中国人的思想依然没有改变。[...] 把种种束缚一律扯散，做一番解放的工夫，再做一番改造的工夫｣.)

The majority of the magazine's contributors were men. These included Qian Xingcun, Pan Gongzhan, Ye Chucang, Gu Kenfu, Xu Banmei, and Guan Ji'an. Editorship of the magazine was handled by Zhou Jianyun. New issues were published every month. It is unknown when the Emancipation Pictorial was disestablished. Eighteen issues have been recorded, and an editorial in the last known issue indicated that publication would continue with reformed content and a new look. No such continuation has been identified.

== Content ==
=== Text ===
Zhou Jianyun wrote in his introduction to the first issue that the Emancipation Pictorial was intended to explore the topic of women's rights – not in an academic sense, but rather within the context of everyday issues affecting the populace. In its seventh issue, the magazine reaffirmed its commitment to equal rights for men and women, whom it characterized as equally responsible to the country. At the same time, it opposed the involvement of women in contemporary political processes. Holding that the contemporary women's rights movement prioritized the desires of upper-class women, it wrote:

Women should absolutely have the right to participate in politics, but in the current political situation, it is not appropriate for women to participate in the political movement. [...] Most women are ignorant; those women, how can they hope to participate in politics! Even if educated women, relying on the power of their fathers, brothers, and husbands, may be able to get an official position. This is individualism. They are simply aristocrats, not liberated women. (Note: Original: ｢女子绝对的应该有参政权，然而照现在的政治状况，女子却绝对的不宜从事参政运动。[...] 大多数底女子，多是愚昧无知；少数女子，哪里够得着参政的希望!就是少数有学问底女子，仗着他父兄丈夫的势力，或则可以得着一官半职，这是个人主义，他们简直是贵族，不是解放的女子｣.)

Illustration by Lin Xin in Emancipation Pictorial, showing an early usage of 她 (tā) ('she')

As with other contemporary women's magazines, the Emancipation Pictorial rejected the treatment of women in pre-republican China, deeming principles such as the Three Obediences and Four Virtues to condemn women to lives of bondage. Such publications emphasized the need for women to exist as their own beings, with their own independent personalities, rather than subordinating themselves to men. The Emancipation Pictorial rejected, for instance, the practice of arranged marriages in favour of love-based unions, holding that the earlier practice had reduced couples to machines manufacturing grandchildren for their parents.

Topics discussed in the Emancipation Pictorial included breast binding, women's education, and marital problems. One article by Zhen Xin opposed the use of the word 女士 (nǚshì; 'lady'), holding that it was rooted in a slave mentality and normally used by women seeking to distinguish themselves from their peers. Other coverage explored the women's rights movement in China and abroad. The magazine identified women's issues as paramount, a starting point for any discussion of emancipation.

Content was written in vernacular Chinese, as classical Chinese was deemed more difficult for the average reader. The Emancipation Pictorial was among the earliest Chinese periodicals to use gendered pronouns to distinguish between men and women. Early issues used the third-person pronoun 伊 (yī) to refer to women; in the July 1921 issue, Emancipation Pictorial used the word 她 (tā) in a cartoon by Lin Xin, which the linguist Huang Xingtao describes as likely the pronoun's first usage in an artistic work. The Emancipation Pictorial also included works of literature, such as poems, short stories, and stage plays.

=== Imagery ===
The Emancipation Pictorial was illustrated with photographs and cartoons, which were deemed better for attracting readers and more readily able to reach the lower and middle classes. The first few pages of each issue generally reproduced artworks, focusing mostly on women in modern styles enjoying leisurely lives. Both works of fiction and non-fiction were accompanied by illustrations. On average, each issue contained twenty-five illustrations – approximately one per article, (Note: The fifth issue – published in October 1920 – contained more than forty illustrations, including some by the cartoonist Ding Song (Shenyang Daily, 2010-01-30).) though the illustration did not always focus on the same topic as the accompanying text. Cover illustrations showed women in the process of gaining liberation, with the third issue depicting a woman with unbound feet pushing through a fence-like design, while the fifth portrayed a woman breaking free of shackles.

Illustrations from the Emancipation Pictorial, showing women weighed down by male supremacy and in the grip of patriarchy

Reviewing the contents of the Emancipation Pictorial, Liu Renfeng of the Hunan Women's University divides its imagery into three categories: depictions of women's suffering in earlier eras, the means of women's liberation, and the future of women's emancipation. As examples of the first, she notes illustrations of a woman smothered by a weight labelled "male supremacy", (Note: Original: ｢男统主义｣.) as well as depictions of fortune telling. Means of emancipation, meanwhile, included an illustration depicting a Statue of Liberty-like figure bearing a torch composed of the words "knowledge", "autonomy", and "personality". (Note: Original: ｢学识、自治、人格｣.) For the future of emancipation, illustrations depicted women as seamstresses, typists, and police officers, conveying the possibility of employment outside the home. At the same time, these illustrations urged restraint, cautioning against fornication, debauchery, opulence, and gambling.

In their style, the illustrations accompanying the Emancipation Pictorial varied from the realistic to the idealized. Realistic illustrations could be used to promote a sort of modern ideal for achievement, or to depict scenes from a literary text to create a picture narrative. Other examples drew from manhua (comics), blending a degree of surrealism to convey their point. Such surrealist tendencies were evident, for instance, in a drawing of a hand labelled "patriarchy" (父权) gripping five people tightly as well as another presenting a woman carrying a boulder labelled "the economy" walking the "road to liberation". (Note: Original: ｢经济｣ and ｢解放之路｣.)

== Legacy ==
Emancipation Pictorial has been described as the first illustrated periodical in China to deal with women's issues. At the time of its publication, several periodicals already focused on similar topics. These included The Ladies' Journal, established in 1915 and published by the Commercial Press, and The Women's Eastern Times. By the 1930s, more than 250 publications in the Republic of China dealt primarily with women's issues.

== Works cited ==
- Andrews, Julia F. (2018). "Persuading with Pictures: Cover Art and The Ladies' Journal (1915–1931)". In Hockx, Michel; Judge, Joan; Mittler, Barbara (eds.). Women and the Periodical Press in China's Long Twentieth Century. Cambridge: Cambridge University Press. pp. 21–56. doi:10.1017/9781108304085.004. ISBN 978-1-108-30408-5.
- Duan Congxue (段从学) (20 January 2022). 钱德富 [Qian Xingcun]. Encyclopaedia of China (in Chinese) (3rd ed.). Archived from the original on 26 December 2024.
- Huang Xingtao (黄兴涛) (2009). "她"字的文化史: 女性新代词的发明与认同研究 [A Cultural History of the Word "She": A Study on the Invention and Identification of New Female Pronouns] (in Chinese). Fujian: Fujian Education Press. ISBN 978-7-5334-5233-9.
- Huang, Xuelei (2014). Shanghai Filmmaking: Crossing Borders, Connecting to the Globe, 1922–1938. Leiden: Brill. ISBN 978-90-04-27933-9.
- Jia, Binwu (2022). "Zheng Zhegu and Performances in Early Chinese Film". Journal of Chinese Film Studies. 2 (2): 261–276. doi:10.1515/jcfs-2022-0002.
- Judge, Joan; Mittler, Barbara; Hockx, Michel (2018). "Introduction: Women's Journals as Multigeneric Artefacts". In Hockx, Michel; Judge, Joan; Mittler, Barbara (eds.). Women and the Periodical Press in China's Long Twentieth Century. Cambridge: Cambridge University Press. pp. 1–10. ISBN 978-1-108-30408-5.
- Liu Renfeng (刘人锋) (2008). 我国妇女报刊史上的第一份画报——《解放画报》 [The First Pictorial Magazine in the History of Chinese Women's Newspapers and Periodicals – Emancipation Pictorial]. Journal of China Women's University (in Chinese) (6): 110–114.
- 中国妇女报刊史上首份画报 初期男作者投稿居多 [The First Pictorial Magazine in the History of Chinese Women's Newspapers and Periodicals; Most of the Early Contributors were Male]. Shenyang Daily (in Chinese). 8 March 2010. Archived from the original on 30 January 2011 – via Sohu.
- Wang Cancan (王璨璨) (7 June 2021). 解放画报 [Emancipation Pictorial]. Encyclopaedia of China (in Chinese) (3rd ed.). Archived from the original on 30 November 2024.
- Wei Yansha (韦艳莎) and Chen Yang (陈洋) (2017). 《解放画报》妇女解放问题图像叙事研究 [A Study of the Narrative Images of Women's Liberation in the Emancipation Pictorial]. Journal of Guangxi Vocational and Technical College (in Chinese) (4): 97–101. Archived from the original on 3 December 2024.
- Zhang Xiaoli (张晓丽) (1999). 简评五四时期的妇女刊物 [A Brief Review of Women's Publications during the May Fourth Movement]. Journal of Anhui Agricultural University (in Chinese). 18 (2): 68–70.
- Zhou, Wei (2022). "The Emergence of the Shanghai-Style Qipao in the 1920s: Consumerism, Cultural Integration, and Feminism". Proceedings of the 2022 5th International Conference on Humanities Education and Social Sciences (ICHESS 2022). Advances in Social Science, Education and Humanities Research. Vol. 720. pp. 619–625. doi:10.2991/978-2-494069-89-3_73. ISBN 978-2-494069-88-6.
