= Zhou Jianyun =

Chinese dramatist and film entrepreneur

Zhou Jianyan
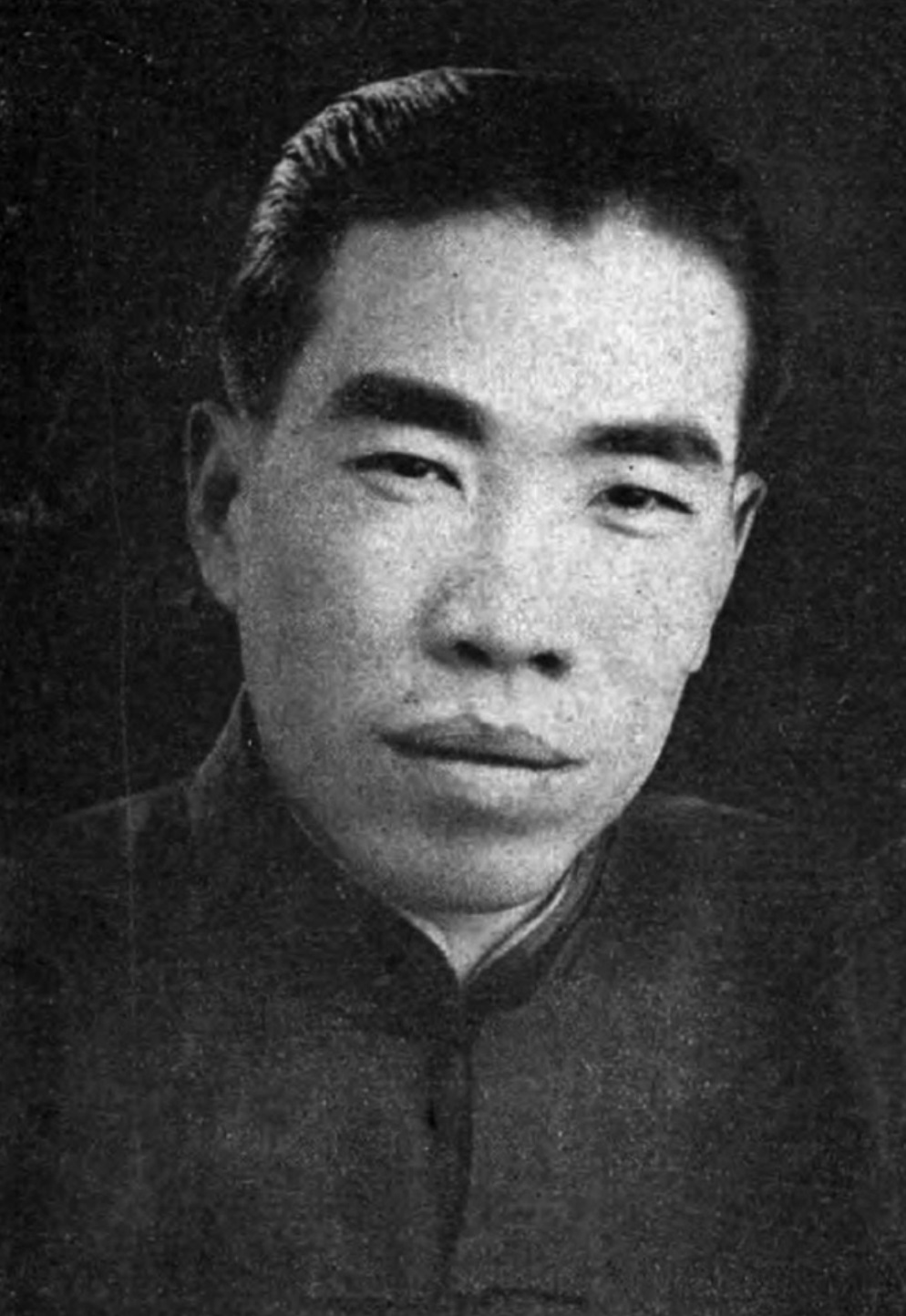
- Zhou, c. 1936
- Born: Zhou Yafu (周亚父); 1883; Hefei, Anhui, Qing China
- Died: 1967 (aged 83–84); Shanghai, China
- Occupation(s): Dramatist, entrepreneur

Chinese name
- Traditional Chinese: 周劍雲
- Simplified Chinese: 周剑云
Transcriptions
Standard Mandarin
- Hanyu Pinyin: Zhōu Jiànyún
- Wade–Giles: Chou^{1} Chien^{4}yün^{2}
- IPA: [ʈʂóʊ tɕjɛ̂n.y̌n]

Zhou Jianyun (simplified Chinese: 周剑云; traditional Chinese: 周劍雲; pinyin: Zhōu Jiànyún, 1883–1967) was a Chinese dramatist and film entrepreneur. Born in Hefei, Anhui, he travelled to Shanghai in his youth for school before entering the city's drama community through the Qimin New Drama Society and press through the Emancipation Pictorial. With his fellow dramatists Zhang Shichuan and Zheng Zhengqiu, in 1922 he established the Mingxing Film Company, variously serving as its manager, finance director, and film distributor. He spearheaded the establishment of the Liuhe Film Distribution Company in 1928, and in the early 1930s he hired several Communist screenwriters. Mingxing was closed in 1939 during the Second Sino-Japanese War, and although Zhou established several further companies, these were short-lived.

== Biography ==
=== Early life ===
Zhou was born Zhou Yafu (亚父) in Hefei, Anhui, in 1883. Studying first at the Shangxian Hall in Beijing, he later transferred to the Jiangnan Arsenal Ordnance Middle School in Shanghai. Zhou read extensively as a youth. He contributed several articles promoting the revolutionary ideals of the Tongmenghui to the Minli Daily, then later reviewed Peking operas for the Jinsheng Daily. He eventually joined the Jiuji Society – an association of amateur opera enthusiasts. As an adult, Zhou took the courtesy name Jianyun.

In 1913, Zhou he was invited to join the Qimin New Drama Society. Established to spread the spoken-word form of "civilized drama", the society later appointed Zhou as its chairman. Zhou continued to write extensively on opera and drama, publishing a book titled The Jubu Collection (鞠部丛刊) on the subject in 1918; this work argued for a blending of Chinese opera and spoken-word drama, with each component complementing the other. He also produced dramas with the society, penning and performing Zheng Hong Lei (征鸿泪) in 1915 in response to the Japanese government's Twenty-One Demands. After this group was disbanded, Zhou participated in a series of student groups from 1919 through 1921.

Also in the 1910s, Zhou established the Xinmin Library together with Zheng Zhegu and Zheng Zhengqiu. This publisher produced several periodicals, including the Yaofeng Monthly (药风月刊) and the Emancipation Pictorial. Zhou was an editor of the latter periodical, working together with Du Yu and Zheng Zhegu. In this capacity, he emphasized its intent to promote equitable relationships between men and women within the context of the new Republic of China. Zhou was a supporter of the May Fourth Movement, and published books that repudiated pro-Japanese government figures such as Zhang Zongxiang and Cao Rulin.

=== Mingxing Film Company ===
In 1922, Zhou partnered with Ren Jinping, Zhang Shichuan, Zheng Zhegu, and Zheng Zhengqiu to establish the Mingxing Film Company, having known them through his time in theatre. Initially, he handled publications. At various points, he served as the manager, finance director, and distributor for the company. In 1924, he established the Changming Film School, a correspondence school intended to teach the practice of filmmaking. Zhou also wrote extensively about drama and cinema. He produced books on screenwriting, film direction, and on the medium itself.

Zhou also participated in several productions, writing the screenplay for Made to Marry (诱婚) and creating intertitles for several of the company's silent films. When the company was experiencing financial difficulties in 1923, Zhou spearheaded the production of the film Orphan Rescues Grandfather. As funding ran out, Zhou pawned his wife's jewellery to ensure that the film could be completed. The film was highly successful, allowing Mingxing to continue production and expand through the mid-1920s.

Minxing united with several other film production companies to establish the Liuhe Film Distribution Company in 1928, with Zhou as a driving force and a member of the executive committee. The company, which sought to promote the domestic film industry, was able to distribute more than 100 films before its closure. Zhou also oversaw the development of animation at the studio, overseeing the hiring of Wang Yang as an apprentice to the Wan brothers.

Through his friend Qian Xingcun, a fellow Anhui native, in the early 1930s Zhou hired Communist writers such as Xia Yan and Zheng Baiqi. This group of writers, working under pseudonyms to avoid censure from the ruling Kuomintang (KMT) government, ultimately produced such works as The Uprising (1933), Children of Our Time (1933), and The Classic for Girls (1934), contributing to the rise of leftist cinema in China. These screenwriters, facing increased pressure from the KMT, withdrew from the company in 1934.

In 1935, Zhou led a group of filmmakers – including the actress Hu Die – to Moscow to attend the inaugural Moscow International Film Festival. The group toured Europe, visiting Berlin, Paris, London, Geneva, and Rome, where they exhibited such films as Spring Silkworms (1933), Twin Sisters (1934), and Lonely Orchid (1935). As the group travelled, Zhou consulted fellow filmmakers, seeking to obtain deeper knowledge of the process.

Around this time, Zhou and other Shanghai-based filmmakers began to recognize the growing Cantonese-language film industry as a threat to Mandarin-language film production; where Mandarin-language films were limited primarily to northern China, Cantonese films were released throughout China and saw distribution among the Chinese diaspora. Filmmakers thus promoted a policy requiring all films to be distributed in Mandarin, though this was ultimately not implemented due to Cantonese-language filmmakers' successful petition for a postponement and the onset of the Second Sino-Japanese War.

=== Later years and death ===
In the late 1930s, Zhou sought to reform Mingxing, bringing further leftist writers into the company. He also hired several new actresses, including Bai Yang and Zhou Xuan, who found success through films such as Crossroads.

Minxing closed in 1937, following the Battle of Shanghai. Zhou established several short-lived film companies in Shanghai and Hong Kong in the 1940s. One of these, Jinxing, produced fourteen films between 1940 and 1941. He retired from film in 1949, and died in Shanghai in 1967.

== Works cited ==
- Ding Zhongwei (丁忠伟) (2011). 周剑云:中国早期戏剧理论的建设者 [Zhou Jianyun: Builder of Early Chinese Drama Theory]. Big Stage (in Chinese) (8): 156–157.
- Du, Daisy Yan (2024). "The Manchukuo Film Association and Its Afterlives: Animated Filmmaking in Wartime and Postwar Peking". JCMS: Journal of Cinema and Media Studies. 63 (2): 119–142. doi:10.1353/cj.2024.a919194.
- Fan, Victor (2019). Extraterritoriality: Locating Hong Kong Cinema and Media. Edinburgh: Edinburgh University Press. doi:10.1515/9781474440448. ISBN 978-1-4744-4044-8.
- Huang, Xuelei (2014). Shanghai Filmmaking: Crossing Borders, Connecting to the Globe, 1922–1938. Leiden: Brill. ISBN 978-90-04-27933-9.
- Jia, Binwu (2022). "Zheng Zhegu and Performances in Early Chinese Film". Journal of Chinese Film Studies. 2 (2): 261–276. doi:10.1515/jcfs-2022-0002.
- Jiang Zhen (姜贞) (2009). 周剑云:中国电影业的儒商 [Zhou Jianyun: A Confucian Businessman in China's Film Industry]. Film and Art (in Chinese): 139–145.
- Jin Qi'an (金其安) (2009). 中国早期电影事业的开拓者周剑云 [Zhou Jianyun, The Pioneer of China's Early Film Industry]. Jianghuai Literature and History (in Chinese) (2): 133–141.
- Liu Renfeng (刘人锋) (2008). 我国妇女报刊史上的第一份画报——《解放画报》 [The First Pictorial Magazine in the History of Chinese Women's Newspapers and Periodicals – Emancipation Pictorial]. Journal of China Women's University (in Chinese) (6): 110–114.
- Xiao, Zhiwei (1998). "Ah Ying". In Zhang, Yingjin; Xiao, Zhiwei (eds.). Encyclopedia of Chinese Film. New York, London: Routledge. p. 79. ISBN 978-0-415-15168-9.
- Xiao, Zhiwei; Zhang, Yingjin (1998). "Zhou Jianyun". In Zhang, Yingjin; Xiao, Zhiwei (eds.). Encyclopedia of Chinese Film. New York, London: Routledge. p. 394. ISBN 978-0-415-15168-9.
