= Laborer's Love =

1922 Chinese silent film

Laborer's Love (aka Romance of a Fruit Peddler)
- Theatrical re-release poster
- Directed by: Zhang Shichuan
- Written by: Zheng Zhengqiu
- Starring: Zheng Zhegu; Zheng Zhengqiu; Yu Ying
- Cinematography: Zhang Weitao
- Production company: Mingxing Film Company
- Release date: 5 October 1922 (China)
- Running time: 22 minutes 10 seconds
- Country: China
- Languages: Silent film Written Chinese and English intertitles

Laborer's Love (traditional Chinese: 勞工之愛情; simplified Chinese: 劳工之爱情; pinyin: láogōng zhī àiqíng) is a classic silent comedy short film produced in China during the Republican Era, which officially premiered on 5 October 1922 at the Olympic Theater in Shanghai. It is also known as Romance of a Fruit Peddler or Romance of a Fruit Pedlar (Chinese: 掷果缘; pinyin: zhì guǒ yuán). Even though filmmaking in China began in the 1890s, Laborer's Love is the earliest complete film from China's early cinematic history that is available today. The film was also one of the earliest productions of the soon-to-be prolific Mingxing Film Company and was directed and written by Mingxing co-founders Zhang Shichuan and Zheng Zhengqiu. Notably, the film has both Chinese and English intertitles, indicating that at this early point in Shanghai cinema history, films were tailored to both Chinese and Western audiences. In addition to the English intertitle cards, the short film further showcased Western influence in Chinese filmmaking, such as taking inspiration from American silent film comedians Charlie Chaplin, Buster Keaton and Harold Lloyd. A subtitled version of the film, which represents differences between the Chinese and English text of the intertitles, is available on YouTube.

== Plot ==
Laborer's Love (1922)

As the film begins, a man named Carpenter Zheng from the Guangdong Province has just come back to Shanghai after living in Nanyang in Southeast Asia. Upon his return, he decides to change professions, becoming a fruit peddler. His business attracts a lot of attention from neighborhood children and Carpenter Zheng is kept busy by his work, in contrast to the struggling medical clinic across the street. The clinic is run by Doctor Zhu and his daughter Miss Zhu, and a romantic attraction quickly develops between the young woman and Zheng. The platonic duo communicates with each other by connecting the fruit stand to the medical clinic via a string, along which they transport baskets filled with objects back and forth to each other, which is also known as the fruit-throwing connection (Chinese: 掷果缘; pinyin: zhì guǒ yuán). Later, Miss Zhu visits Zheng's fruit stand and he helps her to get rid of a few local ruffians who have been harassing her. Eventually, Miss Zhu and Zheng fall in love, but Doctor Zhu opposes the relationship because of Zheng's lower socioeconomic status. However, in the face of his financial hardships, Doctor Zhu agrees to let Zheng marry his daughter if the younger man can help revive his failing medical business. Zheng is dismayed, believing this to be an impossible task, but soon he comes up with the idea to modify the staircase of a gambling club near the doctor's office. He alters the staircase so that he can transform it into a sliding ramp at will; after this, he merely has to wait for unsuspecting customers to leave the club and promptly slide to the bottom of the staircase, injuring themselves at the bottom. He repeats this numerous times, creating a huge new client base for Doctor Zhu to the point where the old man can barely keep up with the demand, requiring Zheng to step in and provide his services as well. With the medical clinic prospering once again, Doctor Zhu gladly approves the marriage between Miss Zhu and Zheng.

== Cast ==
- Zheng Zhegu as Carpenter Zheng (the fruit peddler)
- Zheng Zhengqiu as Doctor Zhu
- Yu Ying as Miss Zhu (the daughter of Doctor Zhu)

== Title ==
As the earliest surviving film from the last century in China, "Romance of a Fruit Peddler" also known as "Laborer's Love," although a silent film, would still be interesting to watch today. In Chinese, "Romance of a Fruit Peddler" means gaining a relationship by throwing fruits. One would not understand the meaning of throwing fruit until one watched the film. "Romance of a Fruit Peddler" or《掷果缘》is not the wrong name, but Carpenter Zheng who is turning to the fruit business, falls in love with the daughter of Doctor Zhu. Carpenter Zheng uses a string that connects with a basket to throw the fruit to Miss Zhu to express his love.

== Film background ==
Laborer's Love is considered the earliest complete, Chinese-made film but is not cited as the first Chinese film. Since the 1890s, China had already experimented with and produced actualités and staged vignettes. However, these earlier films were lost as a result of material degradation, domestic unrest and war—notably the January 28 incident of 1932, in which Japan bombed the city of Shanghai, hitting Mingxing and other film studios. Besides, while Laborer's Love completely survived, it is not perfect with margins cut off, celluloid poorly preserved, as well as frames missing.

In the making of this film, director Zhang Shichuan takes from the cinema and social movements of Modern China.

In 2007, the Australian ensemble Blue Grassy Knoll composed a new score for Laborer's Love and performed it live in Shanghai and Beijing as a part of the Australian Theatre Festival.

== Social influence ==
Laborer's Love's survival is a product of luck, as many films made during the same period did not survive or were severely damaged due to social unrest and war. As a result of these unfortunate events, Laborer's Love is now the earliest complete film to come out of China, essentially making it a historic document and a representation of early Chinese films. The Star film industry, the commercial pass event, the movie theatre department, the Shanghai film and television company, and the Hong Kong Guangya company have used Laborer's Love as a model for short comedy films and were able to release a vast amount of such films.

The ideological change from old ideas to new brought on by the May Fourth Movement in 1919, influenced Laborer's Love. In the film, Carpenter Zheng asks Miss Zhu to marry him, an action that was incompatible with the traditional thought process regarding marriage practices at the time. In light of the social changes, filmmakers sought to navigate the boundary between traditional and moral values through the concept of arranged marriage, while also advocating the modern ideas about free, inconsequential love.

== Cultural references ==
One of the alternative titles of the film, zhì guǒ yuán, meaning "fruit-throwing love connection," is a reference to an old Chinese folktale that is referenced through how the film balances old traditions with innovations in social norms. The film's narrative adapts this traditional motif in the lovers' use of a string to send objects back and forth to each other in a distinctly modern love story.

What is unique about Laborer's Love is that it does not contain the demeanour that is common in early Chinese slapstick comedies, and even uses a connecting device between Carpenter Zheng and Miss Zhu, to allude to the equality between men and women. Compared with previous comedies in China's male-dominated society, it is rare for Chinese love stories in this period to apply this kind of "friendly" drama to the love between a man and a woman. Moreover, the fruit basket which was made by the Carpenter Zheng, contains two functions: one is that it is used as a connection device for the doctor's daughter and the carpenter/vendor to communicate love with one another. The second function is that the basket adds a comedic element, as a mischievous device to fool the doctor.

Laborer's Love contains additional references to traditional Chinese culture; for example, the scene where Carpenter Zheng breaks open a watermelon. This is a reference to an old Chinese idiom called 破瓜之年(pò guā zhī nián), meaning that the girl is at an age where she is "ripe" or mature enough to marry and bear children. In the film, Miss Zhu, who is the love interest, is at an age where she is ready for marriage, this is implied when the watermelon is broken in two or split by Carpenter Zheng. The significance of the splitting of the watermelon alludes to Carpenter Zheng's sexual desire for Miss Zhu.

The function of Carpenter Zheng's staircase outside the nightclub raises debate regarding moral principles. The carpenter's actions are considered immoral due to the injurious consequences that occur to innocent people for his benefit. However, as an element of comedy, it is normal to see these actions toward those who are considered as bad in society as a form of "moral justification."

The thick pair of glasses worn by the Doctor is a status symbol of his professional respectability and paternal authority, in addition to a sign of his laughable pedantry and senility. It implicitly reflects that the modern cultural views aim to abandon the old "pedantry and senility" in China.

The theme of parental objection to marriage is uniquely depicted in the film. It draws on struggle based on gender and social class, through Carpenter Zheng, a man of low socioeconomic status wanting to marry a doctor's daughter. Carpenter Zheng and Miss Zhu resist normative marriage practices while also complying with social expectations by way of Carpenter Zheng finding ways to gain acceptable work to gain paternal approval. Despite the trickery, the young laborer becomes accepted by the father when he helps in the clinic, which consequently alters his social identity: from a laborer to a doctor, thus making him suitable for marriage. By making their marriage possible, they directly undermine Miss Zhu's father's authority, which speaks to modernism, patriarchy, gender, and socio-economic differences. The marriage of a tradesman and a doctor's daughter is significant as it calls out socially constructed bounds that are upheld by cultural norms and values to limit the movement of individuals' socioeconomic status.

== Influence from Western films ==
While Laborer's Love is now canonized as the earliest surviving complete Chinese film, short comedy films were looked down upon by 1920s Chinese audiences and did not do well at the box office, meaning that the film is not an accurate representation of the film culture at this point in Chinese history. In the 1920s, 90% of the films released in China were American films, which greatly influenced both Chinese filmmakers and the Chinese film market. Many of the jokes and visual themes in the work were inspired by American silent film comedians Charlie Chaplin, Harold Lloyd and Buster Keaton, who are among the most famous comedians in the silent film field.

For instance, Doctor Zhu wears glasses in a similar style to the ones characteristically worn by Harold Lloyd. One scene has Carpenter Zheng come into possession of the glasses and try them on in a shot that imitates the iconic image of this popular actor. This results in a blurry point-of-view shot that emphasizes the difference in perspective between the two characters, with Carpenter Zheng representing modern social views and Doctor Zhu representing traditional ones. The film's romantic narrative provides further commentary on how traditional Chinese values were changing in the shift to the modern era, from its depiction of increasing social mobility to the negotiation of marriage and family through feudal and patriarchal codes.

Another Lloyd-style motif is from the scene where Carpenter Zheng and Miss Zhu communicate using a container in a line. This scene is similar to Harold Lloyd's Never Weaken (1921).

Along with referencing Harold Lloyd, the film incorporates the surprise slide staircase, which was a gag popularized by American silent comedian Buster Keaton in his film The Haunted House (1921). This appears in the film when Carpenter Zheng modifies the staircase to a nightclub into a slide that he can activate at will.

Evidently, Mingxing Film Company had its roots in part in the United States, and its English title suggests that Chinese films also exist in the culture of English-speaking audiences.

In early 20th-century Shanghai, Western influence became more prevalent, and this film represents the mixing of culture as Western and Eastern skills and technologies collided. This film shows how China was becoming more open to foreign technologies that are displayed on-screen, such as the alarm clock, table lamp, Western-style furniture and the appearance of the night club.

Laborer's Love came into being during the transition period from short films to long films. According to statistical information, there were nearly 30 short films made in China from 1918 to 1928. The subjects of these short films were primarily marketable slapstick dramas with exaggerated actions and simple plots, while still retaining the traditional mode of civilized drama.

== The Chinese–English bilingual intertitles ==
To begin, the Chinese film industry did not start by filming itself, but by the screening of foreign films. Hence, Chinese filmmakers were inevitably influenced by foreign films. Importantly, Laborer's Love was intended for the international market—the film is not only a national film but also an international film, as it targeted both the Southeast Asian market and the English-speaking world. There were a large number of foreign audiences in the concession area, and English subtitles were intended for foreign audiences. As a tool to help the audience understand the film, subtitles can enable foreign audiences and Chinese audiences to obtain the same aesthetic experience and cultural identity when watching movies. For example, at the beginning of the film, it has the subtitles to explain the storyline: 粤人郑木匠, 改业水果, 与祝医女结掷果缘, 乃求婚于祝医, 祝云: 能使我医业兴隆者, 当以女妻之, 木匠果设妙计, 得如祝愿, 有情人遂成了眷属.(A doctor in needy circumstances, whose daughter is much admired by a fruit shop proprietor [formerly a carpenter] who sticks to the tools of his trade).

However, Chinese culture is profound and some vocabulary has multiple meanings. Under such circumstances, it is difficult to find a corresponding vocabulary for translation in English. Therefore, the translator of Laborer's Love used the method of "demolition" in the face of such differing vocabulary. For instance, the Chinese subtitles were "老伯伯!这是我孝敬你的" which in English translates to "Respected sir, I am not asking you to buy, please accept a humble gift." The point of transmission and the difficulty of translation is the word "孝敬". The word "孝敬" has two meanings here. One is to show the relationship of honor and the other is to give a gift. The English interpretation of the word would be to "give a present; use as a token of respect for one's elders or superior." Evidently, the translator cannot find a word in English that can contain these two meanings. Therefore, in the English translation, the translator uses "respected" and "humble" to show a status of humility and uses "not asking you to buy" and "gift" to reflect the meaning of giving gifts. Although the translation here does not reach lexical and syntactic equivalence, it achieves the telling of the story. The two meanings contained in "孝敬" itself are vividly displayed. The Western audience can get the same aesthetic experience as the Chinese audience when watching the film.

Due to the large cultural differences between the Western and Eastern (mostly China), the ability of subtitle translators is limited. Many lines of the film seem ordinary to our audience, but they all have cultural connotations. In the process of translation, even if a variety of translation methods such as "demolition" are adopted, the lack of cultural information is inevitable. For example, in the Chinese language, one line goes, "(病人): 不是!我有一只乾隆窑的古瓶, 请先生...... (祝医): 我也有一只康熙窑的笔筒, 请你买了去吧!" In English, it goes, "(Patient): ...swelling is a nice Chien Loong vase. I will sell it cheap. (Doctor Zhu): I also have an antique ink spill for sale." The importance of the translation here are the words 乾隆, 康熙, and 古瓶. "乾隆" and "康熙" are both the Emperor from the Qing Dynasty, and the word "古瓶" means the old vase that the Emperor owned. Facing the liar holding the so-called "Antiquity" of the Chien Loong period to sell to Doctor Zhu, Doctor Zhu uses the same method of the liar to send him away—pointing out that he has more valuable antiquity (Kangxi's 康熙 pen container) than the liar. But unfortunately, in the English subtitles, this is not reflected. Instead, the translator translated the "乾隆窑" into "Chien Loong," which is still accurate. However, the translation of "康熙窑" into "antique" has weakened the contrast that Chinese characters have between the generation, and weakened the comedy of Doctor Zhu treating the liar the same way as the liar did the Doctor. The word "康熙" could be translated into "Kangxi," but if translated into "Chien Loong's grandfather," would be more able to show the contrast between the generations. Western audiences, even if they don't know Chien Loong and Kangxi, would still understand the meaning of comparing these two emperors. Thereby, Western audiences can reach the same extent to which Chinese audiences understood and appreciated the film.

== Production ==
- Black and white
- Silent film
- Short film
- Genre: romance film & comedy film: slapstick comedy, romantic comedy, mischief comedy, happy (comic) ending—a modern twist on a traditional custom

== Editing ==
The film's use of various special effects in the film adds both narrative and comedic effects to the film. Such special effects include superimposition, undercranking, out-of-focus shots. Particularly, undercranking, often used in slapstick comedy, is used in Laborer's Love to create gags by enhancing the rhythm of the film through fast play. This effect is achieved through hand-cranking the film at a slower rate while filming, thus when cranking at the regular rate when screening, would create sped-up imagery. In the film, these fast-forward scenes turn trick cinematography into a motif of its own.

For instance, a fast-motion sequence is featured when Carpenter Zheng utilizes his trick staircase to injure the customers leaving the club, acting as a disassembly line. This sequence is later followed by another fast-motion sequence of injured bodies being treated perfunctorily at Doctor Zhu's clinic at the end of the film, acting as an assembly line. Overall, the fast-forwarded, upbeat scenes make for a creative and humorous effect.

This film also makes use of a type of superimposition called matte shots to convey Carpenter Zheng's daydreams of both Miss and Doctor Zhu. This effect is achieved through the filming of two images, which are then combined in postproduction.

Furthermore, out-of-focus shots are utilized when Carpenter Zheng puts on Doctor Zhu's glasses, which the audience can see in first-person, through the eyes of Zheng. This shot is framed through the literal frame of the glasses and the lenses blur out the scene.

== The creativity standard of early Chinese films ==
While the shooting of Laborer's Love involved limitations in the number of scenes and space, it is not merely a form of imitating stage play. In fact, the film plays on conventions of both cinema of attraction(s) as well as narrative cinema. Cinema of attraction(s), coined by Tom Gunning, involves the use of display—gags, props, special effects—to grab the attention of the audience. Narrative cinema allows for the audience to be drawn into the diegesis or fictional story world as it unfolds.

In an early scene, Carpenter Zheng and Miss Zhu communicate through a container on a string. This prop not only visualizes the connection between the two characters but also allows for their romantic interest to be revealed and unfolded. Carpenter Zheng shares his affection by gifting Miss Zhu fruit while she sends back her handkerchief as a token of affection, as well as Doctor Zhu's glasses. Connection devices such as these appeared often in the Rube Goldberg comics and Charlie Chaplin films of the 1910s.

Aside from alluding to Harold Lloyd's iconic character, the blurry point-of-view shot of Carpenter Zheng wearing Doctor Zhu's glasses puts the audience in the position of looking in first-person, immersing them in the story world. The blurry vision hints at the idea that Dr. Zhu is literally blind and blind in his priorities in life, putting the profit of his business over the happiness of his daughter.

The trick staircase used at the end of the film is another borrowed motif from American cinema, specifically Buster Keaton's The Haunted House (1921).

In a later scene, Carpenter Zheng is seen overjoyed, then bitter, as a matte shot appearing in the upper-left corner of the frame reveals his daydreams of Miss Zhu and Doctor Zhu. Double- and/or multiple-exposure photography was a popular novelty in 20th-century China, which was known as "split-self photography" (Chinese: 分身像; pinyin: fēnshēn xiàng) or "two-me's photo" (Chinese: 二我图; pinyin: èrwǒ tú).

Furthermore, Zheng's skill and enjoyment in carpentry mirrors Director Zhang Shichuan's skill and enjoyment in the making of this film. Many events of the film combine tricks of Zheng's carpentry and Director Zhang's special effects, such as the trick staircase combined with undercranking. Both Carpenter Zheng and the film's director fulfill their desire of pleasing an audience as well as enjoying their trade.

Overall, it is evident that early Chinese cinema not only often takes inspiration from American cinema but already had a high standard of creativity. As a film itself, Laborer's Love creates a new form of love between male and female, which differs from traditional Chinese expectations of love. However, while straying away from notions of arranged love and allowing the two characters to decide their romantic fate, the film revisits the Chinese traditions through Carpenter Zheng asking the permission of Doctor Zhu to court Miss Zhu.

== Release and reception ==
Laborer's Love premiered at as part of a double feature with The King of Comedy Visits Shanghai at the Olympic Theatre on 5 October 1922. Initially scheduled for a two-day run, with three showings per day, the screening was extended to four days, suggesting some popularity with audiences.

Laborer's Love was hailed for its breakthrough from the theatrical model of filmmaking, particularly in terms of cinematography, as the film uses techniques like panoramic photography, close-up, cross-cutting, superimposition, downscale photography and subjective shots. This film, along with quite a number of other Mingxing films, have been treated as "classics" and analyzed textually and artistically. However, as the film was considered as unsuccessful and unprofitable during its theatrical run, some criticized the film to be "full of poor taste," and "made from the purpose of appealing to the petty bourgeois." However, it was also pointed out that the degree of attention paid to the fact of the film's preservation has caused most scholarship to ignore what the film was intended to be: a comedy. In fact, the film director, Zhang Shichuan later had similar argument over the choice of film theme with the writer, Zheng Zhengqiu. Zheng suggested on his artistic idea to "improve and educate society," while Zhang replied that "[w]hat matters are audiences' interests and to win their laugh" and that "there is no place for doctrine yet."

The film was included in the list of China's 100 Film Classics of the Century made by China's Film Critics Society in 2005.
