= Zhang Shichuan =

Chinese film producer

Zhang Shichuan 張石川
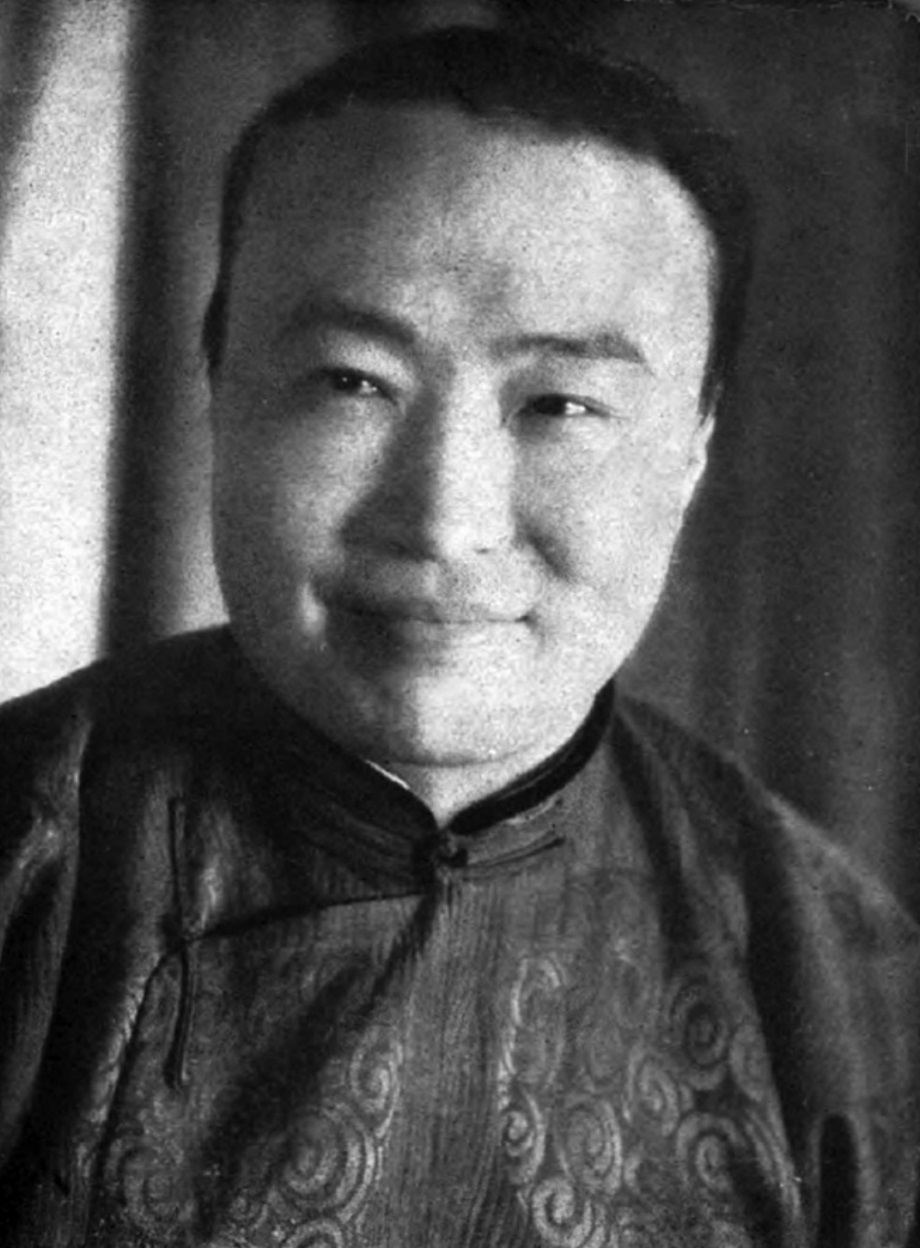
- Zhang c. 1936
- Born: Zhang Weitong; 1889 or 1890; Ningbo, Zhejiang, Qing China
- Died: 1953 or 1954 (aged 64); Shanghai, China
- Occupations: Entrepreneur, filmmaker
- Known for: A founding father of Chinese cinema

Chinese name
- Traditional Chinese: 張石川
- Simplified Chinese: 张石川
Transcriptions
Standard Mandarin
- Hanyu Pinyin: Zhāng Shíchuān
- Wade–Giles: Chang Shih-ch'uan

Zhang Shichuan (Wade–Giles: Chang Shih-ch'uan; 1889–1953 or 1890–1954), also credited as S. C. Chang, was a Chinese entrepreneur, film director, and film producer, who is considered a founding father of Chinese cinema. He and Zheng Zhengqiu made the first Chinese feature film, The Difficult Couple, in 1913, and co-founded the Mingxing (Star) Film Company in 1922, which became the largest film production company in China under Zhang's leadership.

Zhang directed about 150 films in his career, including Laborer's Love (1922), the earliest complete Chinese film that has survived; Orphan Rescues Grandfather (1923), one of the first Chinese box-office hits; The Burning of the Red Lotus Temple (1928), the first martial arts film; and Sing-Song Girl Red Peony (1931), China's first sound film.

After the destruction of Mingxing's studio by Japanese bombing during the 1937 Battle of Shanghai, Zhang Shichuan made films for the China United Film Production Company (Zhonglian) in Japanese-occupied Shanghai, which led to accusations of treason after the surrender of Japan in 1945. He never recovered from the humiliation, and died in 1953 or 1954.

== Early life ==
Zhang Shichuan was born Zhang Weitong (张伟通) in Beilun, Ningbo, Zhejiang province. Shichuan was his courtesy name, originally written with the different characters 蚀川. His father Zhang Heju (张和巨) was a small merchant dealing with silkworms. His father died when Zhang was 16 years old, and he had to quit school and move to Shanghai to live with his maternal uncle Jing Runsan (经润三), a successful comprador. In Shanghai, he worked at the American-owned Huayang Company by day and studied English at night.

== Early ventures ==
In 1913, Yashell and Suffert, two Americans in Shanghai who had acquired the Asia Film Company, asked Zhang to be their consultant. Despite his lack of experience in filmmaking, Zhang took over the company's work responsibilities. He sought help from Zheng Zhengqiu, a well-known playwright, and the two cofounded the Xinmin (新民) Film Company to make film for the Asia Company. Soon they made China's first feature film, The Difficult Couple, in 1913. However, Xinmin and Asia went out of business when their supply of German film stock was cut off after the outbreak of World War I. When his uncle died, Zhang was asked by his aunt to manage the family's New World amusement park.

In 1916, Zhang formed Huanxian (Fantasy) Film Company, when American film stock became available in Shanghai, and made the film Victims of Opium, adapted from a stage play. But the company soon folded, and he returned to manage the amusement park, which was sold in 1920.

== Mingxing Film Company ==
In 1922, Zhang and his old partner Zheng Zhengqiu, together with Zhou Jianyun (周剑云), Zheng Zhegu (郑鹧鸪), and Ren Jinping (任矜萍), founded the Mingxing (Star) Film Company. As a Western-influenced businessman, Zhang's main priority was profit, which differed from that of Zheng Zhengqiu, a playwright from an aristocratic family who emphasized cinema's role in social reform and moral enlightenment. The company's earliest films, such as The King of Comedy Visits Shanghai (1922), were mainly entertainment-oriented, but Zhang also directed Zheng's moralistic films such as Orphan Rescues Grandfather (1923), which was a box-office success. When Zhang Shichuan's The Burning of the Red Lotus Temple (1928) became a phenomenal hit, he produced as many as 17 sequels in the next three years. The film marked the beginning of the hugely popular martial arts film genre, and many competing studios rushed to make similar films.

In 1928, Mingxing became a limited shareholding company, and registered with the government to sell stocks to the public. For its entire existence of 17 years, Zhang served as the company's general manager and director. Under his leadership, it became China's largest film production company. In cooperation with Hong Shen, Zhang directed Sing-Song Girl Red Peony in 1931, the first Chinese sound film (though it was sound-on-disc, not sound-on-film).

In the early 1930s, Japan's invasion of Manchuria and attack of Shanghai produced a sense of national crisis in China. Mingxing made a leftist turn under Zhang's management. He hired a number of leftist writers, who wrote scripts for such films as The Tenderness Market (1933) and Lucky Money (1937).

In August 1937, the Battle of Shanghai erupted, and the Imperial Japanese Army occupied Shanghai (except the foreign concessions) after months of fighting. The Mingxing Studio was destroyed by Japanese bombing in the battle. Zhang salvaged some equipment and joined the Guohua Film Company, but was never able to revive Mingxing.

== Japanese occupation and aftermath ==
With the outbreak of the Pacific War in 1941, the Japanese took over the Shanghai International Settlement, which had been under British and American control, and combined Shanghai's remaining film studios into the Zhonglian (China United) Film Production Company. Zhang worked for the Japanese-controlled company as a branch manager and director.

After the surrender of Japan at the end of World War II, Zhang was accused of treason for having worked for the Japanese, but was not officially indicted. He briefly worked in Hong Kong for the Great China Film Company, and in Shanghai for the Datong Film Company, but never recovered from the humiliating label of traitor. He died in Shanghai in 1953 or 1954, aged 64.

== Legacy ==
Zhang Shichuan is considered one of the founding fathers of Chinese cinema. He directed about 150 films in his career, including The Difficult Couple (1913), the first Chinese feature film; Laborer's Love (1922), the earliest complete Chinese film that has survived; Orphan Rescues Grandfather (1923), one of the first Chinese box-office hits; The Burning of the Red Lotus Temple (1928), the earliest martial arts film which started an enormously popular genre; and Sing-Song Girl Red Peony (1931), China's first sound film.

Under Zhang's leadership, Mingxing was the largest and most influential film studio in China. Many highly influential directors and writers, including Hong Shen, Cheng Bugao, Xia Yan, Ouyang Yuqian, Shen Xiling, Cai Chusheng, and Yang Hansheng, began or developed their careers at Mingxing.

== Selected filmography ==
As director

- Thieves on Trial (1913)
- A Funny Love Affair (1913)
- The Difficult Couple (1913)
- Bride Meets Ghost (1913)
- Victims of Opium (1916)
- Laborer's Love (1922)
- Zhang Xinsheng (1922)
- The King of Comedy Visits Shanghai (1922)
- An Orphan Rescues His Grandfather (1923)
- The Poor Children (1924)
- Love and Vanity (1924)
- The Death of Yuli (1924)
- A Sincerely Pitiful Girl (1925)
- A Lesser Friend (1925)
- The Last Conscience (1925)
- The Unknown Hero (1926)
- A Shanghai Woman (1926)
- Lonely Orchid (1926) (2 parts)
- He Wants to Have a Baby (1926)
- A Good Guy (1926)
- Ma Yongzhen From Shandong (1927)
- The Burning of the Red Lotus Temple (1928–31) (16 parts)
- The Young Mistress' Fan (1928)
- White Cloud Pagoda (1928)
- The Revengeful Man (1928) (2 parts)
- The Luoyang Bridge (1928)
- Love Story on Classmates (1928)
- Divorce (1928)
- Dad Loves Mom (1929)
- Sing-Song Girl Red Peony (1931)
- Cosmetics of Market (1933)
- Bible for Girls (1934)
- Red Begonia (1936)
- Dr. Li and Miss Tang (1939)
- The West Chamber (1940)
