= Never Weaken =

1921 film

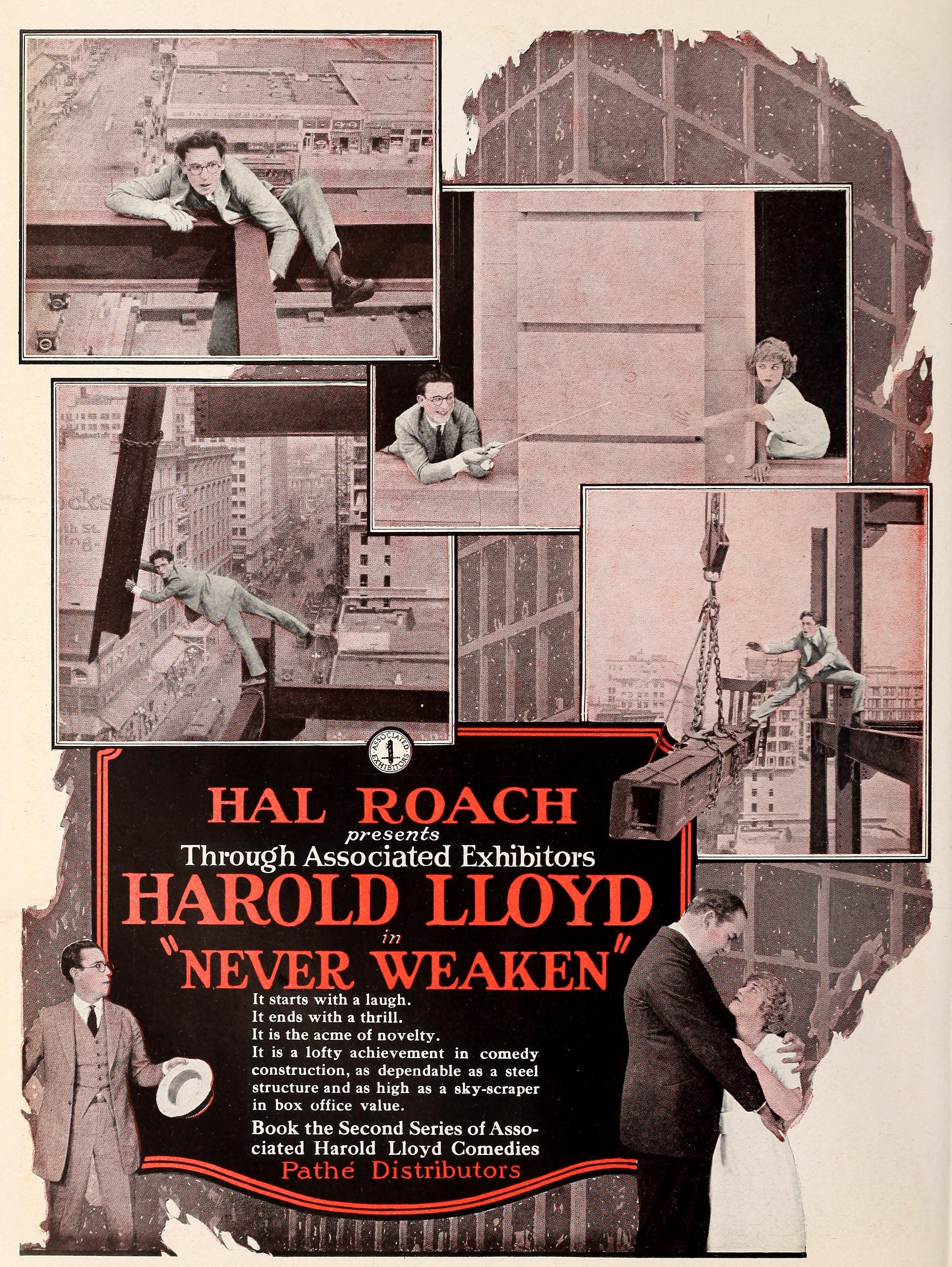
- Directed by: Fred C. Newmeyer; Sam Taylor
- Written by: Hal Roach; Sam Taylor; H. M. Walker
- Produced by: Hal Roach
- Starring: Harold Lloyd
- Cinematography: Walter Lundin
- Edited by: Thomas J. Crizer
- Production company: Rolin Film Company
- Distributed by: Pathé Exchange
- Release date: October 22, 1921
- Running time: 28 minutes
- Country: United States
- Language: Silent (English intertitles)

Never Weaken is a 1921 American silent short comedy film starring Harold Lloyd and directed by Fred C. Newmeyer.

It was Lloyd's last short film, running to three reels, before he moved permanently into feature-length production. It was also one of his trademark 'thrill' comedies, featuring him dangling from a tall building. Lloyd and his crew honed and perfected their "thrill" filming techniques in this film, and put them to use in the 1923 feature Safety Last!

== Plot ==
The full short

Harold works in an office on a tall building next to his girlfriend Mildred. Mildred learns she will be let go by her employer, osteopathic specialist Dr. Frank Gary, because "business is slow."

To prevent Mildred from losing her job, Harold takes to the streets. He injures several people, then hands them a business card with Dr. Gary's information. Harold succeeds in acquiring patients for Dr. Gary, ostensibly saving Mildred's job. However, he enters Dr. Gary's office and sees Mildred accepting what he assumes is a marriage proposal from another man.

Distraught, he decides to commit suicide, blindfolding himself and setting up a gun which will fire when he pulls a string attached to the trigger. But after putting on the blindfold he accidentally knocks over a bulb which pops, and he assumes he has shot himself. At that moment, a girder from the next door construction site swings into his office, lifting him and his chair outside. Pulling off the blindfold, the first thing he sees is a sculpture high on his building which he takes to be an angel, and he assumes he is in Heaven. However a jazz band on an adjacent rooftop garden soon disabuses him of that notion, and he realises he is high above the city.

After several perilous escapades high on the construction site, he finally makes it to the ground, only to realise that the man Mildred was talking to was her clergyman brother, who has agreed to officiate at their wedding.

== Cast ==
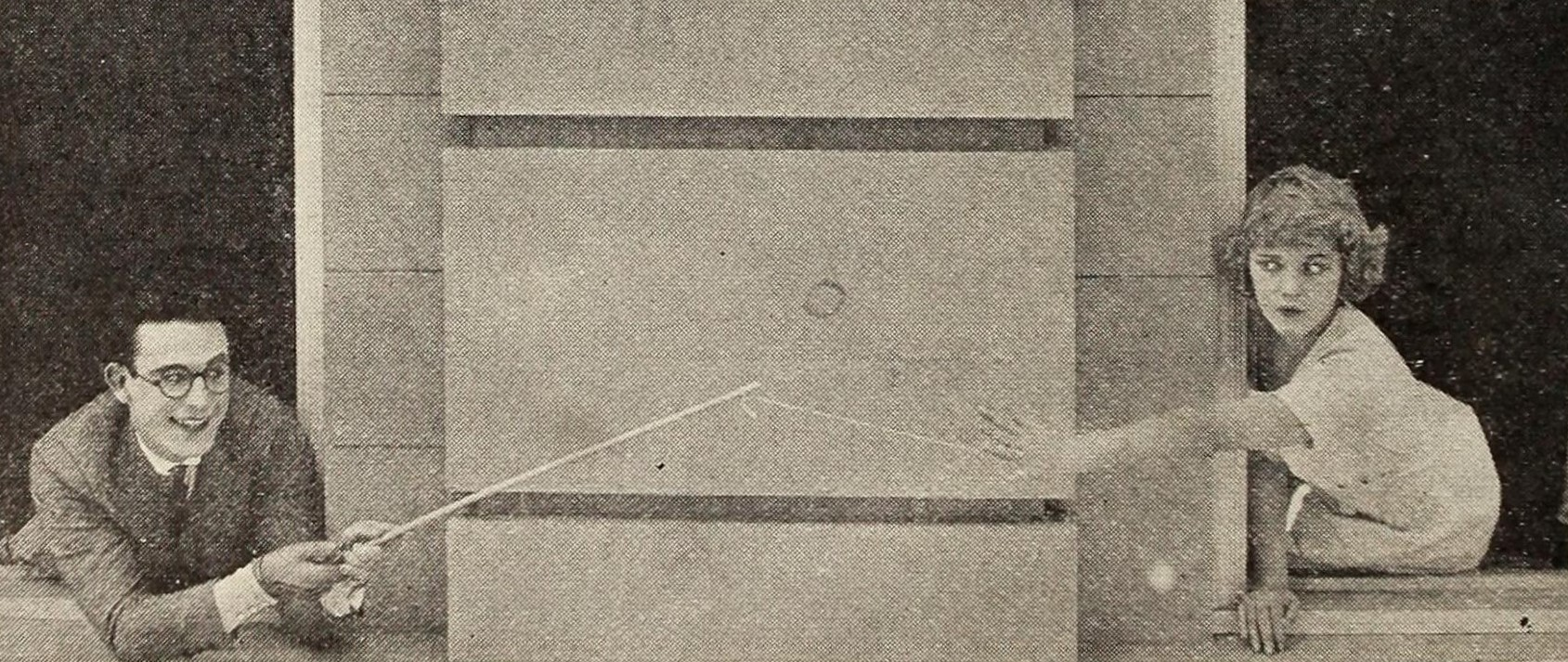
Still with Harold Lloyd and Mildred Davis

- Harold Lloyd as The Boy
- Mildred Davis as The Girl
- Roy Brooks as The Other Man
- Mark Jones as The Acrobat
- Charles Stevenson as The Police Force
- George Rowe as Crossed-Eyed Accident Victim
- William Gillespie as Dr. Frank Gary, The Girl's employer (uncredited)

== See also ==
- Harold Lloyd filmography
