= Orphan Rescues Grandfather =

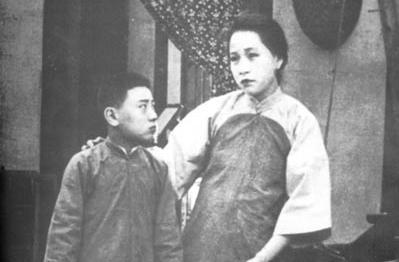
- Zheng Xiaoqiu as Yu Pu and Wang Hanlun as Yu Weiyu
- Traditional Chinese: 孤兒救祖記
- Simplified Chinese: 孤儿救祖记
Transcriptions
Standard Mandarin
- Hanyu Pinyin: Gū'ér jiù zǔ jì
- Directed by: Zhang Shichuan
- Screenplay by: Zheng Zhengqiu
- Starring: Wang Hanlun; Zheng Zhegu; Zheng Xiaoqiu
- Cinematography: Zhang Weitao
- Production company: Mingxing Film Company
- Release date: 18 December 1923 (China)
- Running time: 100 minutes
- Country: China
- Language: Silent

Orphan Rescues Grandfather (simplified Chinese: 孤儿救祖记; traditional Chinese: 孤兒救祖記; pinyin: Gū'ér jiù zǔ jì), also translated as An Orphan Rescues His Grandpa, is a 1923 Chinese silent film directed by Zhang Shichuan for the Mingxing Film Company. Starring Wang Hanlun, Zheng Zhegu, and Zheng Xiaoqiu, this melodrama follows the pregnant widow of a wealthy man who, after her reputation is tarnished, is evicted from her husband's family. Ten years later, her son becomes an apt pupil who saves his grandfather from a plot to steal his wealth.

Produced while Mingxing was in dire financial straits, Orphan Rescues Grandfather was intended as a moral tale about the importance of education. It was released to critical and commercial success, being distributed through China and into Southeast Asia. Through its profits, Mingxing was able to expand and ultimately become one of the leading studios in Shanghai cinema.

== Plot ==
Newlyweds Yang Daosheng and Yu Weiyu are living with Yang's father, Shouchang. Their happy lives are shattered after Daosheng is killed in an equestrian accident. His cousin Daopei, seeking control of the family fortune, influences Shouchang to adopt him and hire his friend Lu Shoujing. Daopei spreads baseless claims that Weiyu had been unfaithful. Scorned and pregnant, she is forced to leave the family and live in squalor. Daopei and Shoujing, meanwhile, squander the Yang family's wealth.

After ten years, Weiyu's son Yu Pu has grown into an intelligent youth and is studying at a school established by his grandfather; neither is aware of their familial relationship. Shouchang, meanwhile, learns of Daopei's misdeed and confronts him. Daopei and Shoujing attempt to kill him, but Yu Pu interrupts. Daopei ultimately admits that he had fabricated the claims against Weiyu, and a repentant Shouchang offers her half of his fortune. Recognizing the importance of education, she gives half of her inheritance to the school.

== Production ==
Orphan Rescues Grandfather was produced by the Mingxing Film Company. Established in 1922 with 10,000 yuan (equivalent to ¥1,100,000 in 2019) in capital, Mingxing had produced several films but found little financial success. So great were its financial straits that Zhou Jianyun, one of the company's co-founders, had to pawn his wife's jewellery to complete the production of Orphan Rescues Grandfather. The film, intended to teach the importance of education, was produced over a period of eight months.

Orphan Rescues Grandfather was directed by Zhang Shichuan. The widow was portrayed by Wang Hanlun in her first film role, while the role of the family patriarch was played by Zheng Zhegu. The titular orphan, meanwhile, was portrayed by Zheng Xiaoqiu. Another role was held by Wang Xianzai. Several smaller roles were taken by students with Mingxing's film school.

The screenplay was written by Zheng Zhengqiu, a co-founder of Mingxing. Zheng had formerly distributed several films by D. W. Griffith for Chinese audiences, and the film scholar Qijun Han notes similarities between Orphan Rescues Grandfather and Griffith's works. She identifies the title as an allusion to Orphans of the Storm (1921). The overarching plot of salvation, meanwhile, echoes Way Down East (1920). Although both films had binary oppositions between good and bad, moral and immoral, they differed in the person being rescued; where the person rescued in Way Down East was a romantic interest, Orphan Rescues Grandfather had the family as the locus of salvation.

== Release and reception ==
After a rough cut was shown for feedback at the Shanghai Grand Theatre in November 1923, Orphan Rescues Grandfather was previewed at the Apollo Theatre in Shanghai on 18 December. Mingxing advertised extensively, sending out hundreds of invitations for the premiere. General screenings began on 21 December, with distribution extending from Shanghai to Beijing, Nanjing, and Suzhou in subsequent months, as well as Southeast Asia. The film was an immediate commercial success, such that one distributor offered up to nine thousand yuan (equivalent to ¥890,000 in 2019) for distribution rights. Press reviews were likewise laudatory.

Orphan Rescues Grandfather has been described as the "first narrative feature" in Chinese cinema. Buoyed by the film's success, Mingxing was able to purchase new machinery and equipment. In 1924, it moved into a new studio and began offering shares. In subsequent years, it established itself as an industry leader and continued to produce films with explicit moral lessons. Wang Hanlun, having found acclaim through her role, established herself as a movie star. Han describes Orphan Rescues Grandfather as establishing, to a certain extent, a structure followed by subsequent Chinese melodramas focused on the family.

== Works cited ==
- Han, Qijun (8 March 2016). The Cinematic Representation of the Chinese American Family. Cambridge: Cambridge Scholars. ISBN 978-1-4438-9001-4.
- Jiang Zhen (姜贞) (2009). 周剑云:中国电影业的儒商 [Zhou Jianyun: A Confucian Businessman in China's Film Industry]. Film and Art (in Chinese): 139–145.
- Jin Qi'an (金其安) (2009). 中国早期电影事业的开拓者周剑云 [Zhou Jianyun, The Pioneer of China's Early Film Industry]. Jianghuai Literature and History (in Chinese) (2): 133–141.
- Xiao, Zhiwei (1998). "Chinese Cinema". In Zhang, Yingjin; Xiao, Zhiwei (eds.). Encyclopedia of Chinese Film. New York, London: Routledge. pp. 3–30. ISBN 978-0-415-15168-9.
- Xiao, Zhiwei (1998). "Orphan Rescues Grandfather". In Zhang, Yingjin; Xiao, Zhiwei (eds.). Encyclopedia of Chinese Film. New York, London: Routledge. pp. 258–259. ISBN 978-0-415-15168-9.
- Xiao, Zhiwei; Zhang, Yingjin (1998). "Film Education". In Zhang, Yingjin; Xiao, Zhiwei (eds.). Encyclopedia of Chinese Film. New York, London: Routledge. pp. 167–166. ISBN 978-0-415-15168-9.
- Zhang Wei (張偉) (2009). 談影小集——中國現代影壇的塵封一隅 [A Collection of Shorts about Movies—A Dusty Corner of China's Modern Film World] (in Chinese). Taipei: Showway Publishing. ISBN 978-986-221-308-7.
- Zhang, Yingjin (2004). Chinese National Cinema. London: Psychology Press. ISBN 978-0-415-17289-9.
- Zhang, Zhen (2005). An Amorous History of the Silver Screen: Shanghai Cinema, 1896–1937. Chicago: University of Chicago Press. ISBN 978-0-226-98238-0.
