= Chen Yu-hui =

Taiwanese wuxia novelist

Chen Yu-hwei
- 陳宇慧
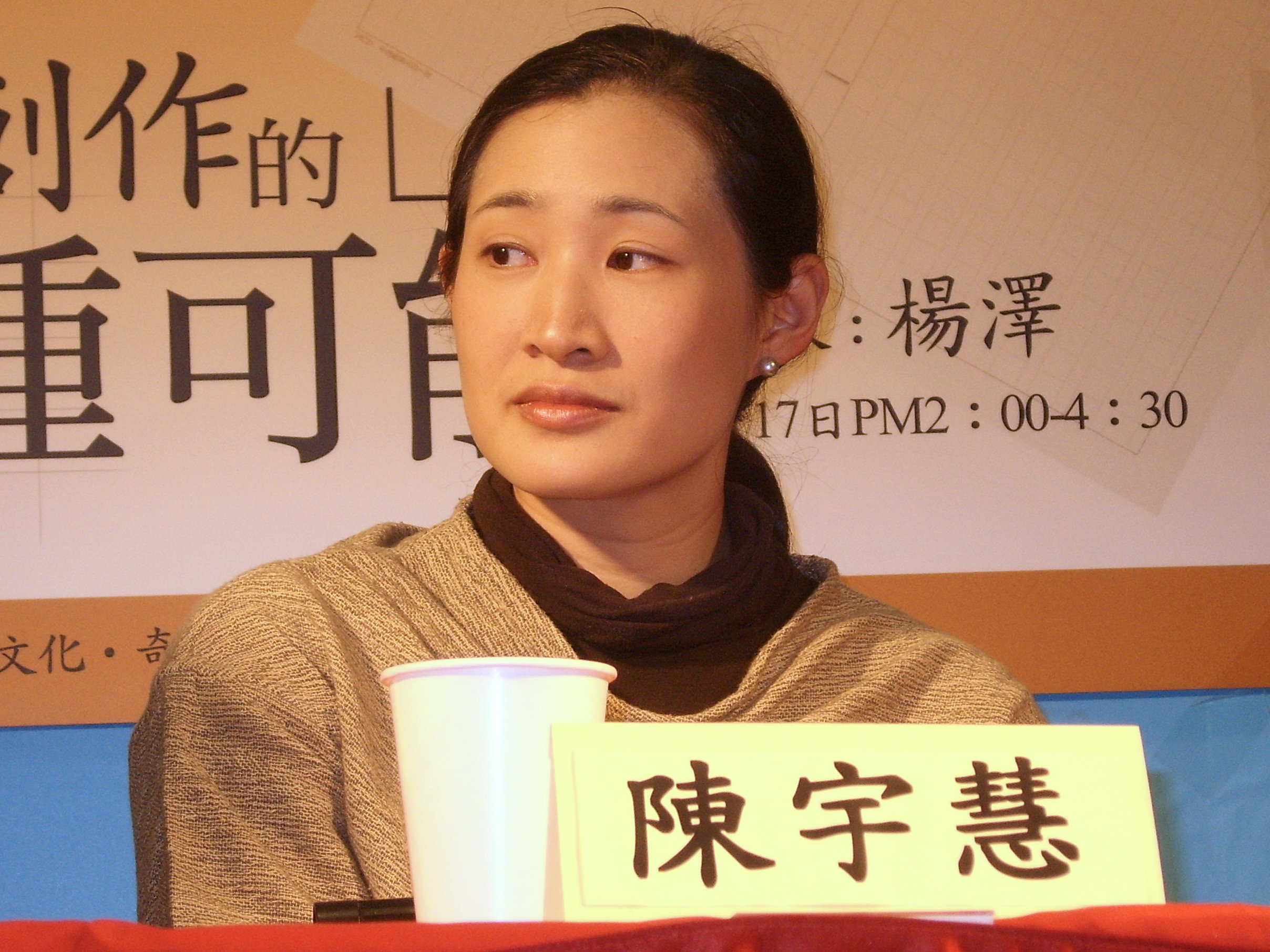
- Chen at the 2008 Taipei International Book Exhibition
- Born: 1973 (age 52–53); Taipei, Taiwan
- Other name: Zheng Feng (鄭丰)
- Education: Massachusetts Institute of Technology (BS)
- Occupations: Wuxia novelist, Director of ABN AMRO (Hong Kong)
- Known for: Writer
- Parent: Chen Li-an

Chen Yu-hwei (Chinese: 陳宇慧; born 1973), also known as Zheng Feng, is a Taiwanese wuxia novelist.

== Biography ==
Born in 1973 in Taipei, Taiwan to Chen Li-an, a former president of Control Yuan of Republic of China and Cecilia Tsao, the founder of Cecilia Arts, Chen is the fourth child and the only daughter of a prominent clan. Her great-grandfather Tan Yankai is a former president of Republic of China and her grandfather Chen Tsyr-shiou is a former vice president of Republic of China.

Chen attended Fu-Hsing Private School and Affiliated Senior High School of National Taiwan Normal University in Taipei for primary and secondary education. Encouraged by her father, she began reading wuxia novels by Louis Cha since primary school and was fascinated with his works, which deeply influenced her future writing career. During her childhood and teenage years, Chen was also obsessed with classic Chinese literature, and this equipped her with eloquent narrative skills in Old Chinese.

Chen was enrolled in Massachusetts Institute of Technology in 1991 and earned a bachelor's degree from Sloan Business School in 1995. After graduation, she moved to Hong Kong and worked for JP Morgan Chase as an investment banker. She spent one year in London. Her experience in London inspired her imagination and she set pen on the draft of her first wuxia novel.

She returned to Hong Kong and resumed her investment banking career with ABN AMRO, where she retired as director in 2009. Her first novel was published in 2006 and won the Best Novel Award in a wuxia novel competition in Greater China. After that, she published another four novels.

She became a professional novelist in 2009 and began serving on the board of the Independent Schools Foundation Academy.
