= Salix daguanensis =

Scientific classification
- Kingdom: Plantae
- Clade: Tracheophytes
- Clade: Angiosperms
- Clade: Eudicots
- Clade: Rosids
- Order: Malpighiales
- Family: Salicaceae
- Genus: Salix
- Species: S. daguanensis

Binomial name
- Salix daguanensis P.I Mao & P.X. He

Species of shrub

Salix daguanensis is a shrub in the willow genus Salix with 4 to 8 centimeter long leaf blades. The natural range of the species is in China.

== Taxonomy ==
The species was described in 1987 by Mao Pin I and He Pi Xu in the Acta Botanica Yunnanica.

== Description ==
Salix daguanensis is a shrub up to 2 meters high. Young twigs are hairy brown at the tip. The buds are large, long ellipsoid and also hairy brown. The leaves have a 6 to 10 millimeter long petiole. The leaf blade is oblong-lanceolate, 4 to 8 inches long and 1.2 to 2.4 centimeters wide. The leaf margin is indistinctly serrated, the leaf base is broadly wedge-shaped to more or less rounded. Both sides of the leaf are initially slightly hairy, while older leaves only have fine hairs on the underside along the midrib. The leaf veins on the underside are protruding. The top of the leaf is green.

The inflorescences are thin, petiolate, 3 to 7 centimeters long and about 4 millimeters in diameter catkins. The peduncle is up to 1.5 millimeters long, but can sometimes be missing. It has two or three leaflets. The inflorescence axis is finely hairy. The bracts are yellow, elongated and have a rounded tip and a white, hairy leaf margin. Male flowers usually have two, rarely only one whole or two-part nectar gland. Usually two rarely three stamens are formed. The stamens are free and have fine white hairs on the underside and about twice as long as the bracts. Female flowers have oneadaxial nectar gland. The ovary is ovoid-conical, hairless and sedentary. The stylus is divided into two parts and about 1 millimeter long, the stigma is bilobed. Salix daguanensis flowers only after the leaves have sprout from July to August, the fruits ripen in October.

== Range ==
The natural range is in the Chinese province of Yunnan in the districts of Daguan and Yiliang. Salix daguanensis grows in the mountains at altitudes of 1700 to 2000 meters.

== Literature ==
- Wu Zheng-yi, Peter H. Raven (Ed.): Flora of China. Volume 4: Cycadaceae through Fagaceae. Science Press / Missouri Botanical Garden Press, Beijing / St. Louis 1999, ISBN 0-915279-70-3, pp. 195, 199 (English).
