= Luo Wen-shan =

Taiwanese military officer and politician

Luo Wen-shan (Chinese: 羅文山; born c. 1936) is a Taiwanese military officer and politician.

== Early life and political career ==
Luo Wen-shan was born c. 1936. He attended the Republic of China Military Academy, where he later served as an administrator. He then served as administrative deputy minister of national defense under Chen Li-an, and was elected to the third convocation of the National Assembly in 1996. He chaired the Chinese Huangpu Four Seas Alliance Association, and was affiliated with the Huang Fu-hsing faction of the Kuomintang.

== Controversy ==
In July 2016, the Taipei District Prosecutors' Office charged Luo with embezzlement, and a violation of the Political Donations Act, by accepting money from Xu Zhiming, a member of the national committee of the Chinese People's Political Consultative Conference, during Luo's tenure as head of the Chinese Huangpu Four Seas Alliance Association. A total of NT$10 million was paid in four transactions, in 2008, 2010, and 2012, and three of the payments were traced to Xu. The prosecutors' investigation into Luo found that he deposited all of the payments into direct deposit accounts belonging to him and his wife, then moved three remittances into an account owned by Chinese Huangpu Four Seas Alliance Association. The fourth remittance was moved to the association's bank account in 2013. The Taipei District Court ruled on the case in December 2019, sentencing Luo to five concurrent terms of imprisonment, one term each for the four political donations, and the fifth for embezzlement.
