= Chang Wei-han =

Chinese politician (1886–1979)

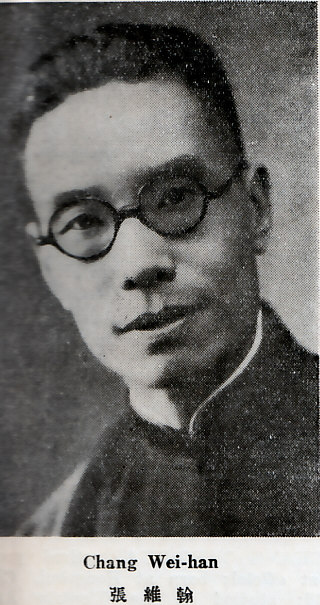
- Chang, c. 1931

Acting President of the Control Yuan
- In office 15 May 1972 – 19 March 1973
- Preceded by: Lee Shih-tsung
- Succeeded by: Yu Chun-hsien

Vice President of the Control Yuan
- In office 2 November 1965 – 19 March 1973
- Preceded by: Lee Shih-tsung
- Succeeded by: Chou Pai-lien

Secretary General of the Legislative Yuan
- In office 28 May 1932 – 14 January 1933
- Preceded by: Wu Jinghong
- Succeeded by: Liang Hancao

Personal details
- Born: 29 December 1886 Daguan County, Yunnan, Qing China
- Died: 1 September 1979 (aged 92) Neihu District, Taipei, Taiwan
- Party: Kuomintang
- Education: University of Tokyo

Chang Wei-han (traditional Chinese: 張維翰; simplified Chinese: 张维翰; pinyin: Zhāng Weíhàn; 29 December 1886 – 1 September 1979) was a politician of the Republic of China who served as acting President of the Control Yuan from 1972 to 1973.

== Biography ==
Chang was born in Daguan County, Yunnan in 1886. He supported the rebelling Yunnan Army during the Xinhai Revolution and joined the Kuomintang in 1912. In 1913, he became head of the Yunnan Provincial Administrative Office and became the governor of Yanxing County under Tang Jiyao's administration. After Yunnan clique general Cai E led troops into Sichuan during the National Protection War, Chang was summoned there to become head of the Sichuan Military Administration. He returned to Yunnan in 1917. He went to Japan in 1918 to study at the University of Tokyo. After returning to China in 1922, he became the first director of the Kunming Municipal Government. After Tang Jiyao was removed from power in 1927, Chang served as a member of the Yunnan Provincial Government and a special negotiator of the Ministry of Foreign Affairs in Yunnan.

In 1930, Yunnan warlord Lu Han launched a mutiny in an attempt to force Chang, Long Yun, Sun Du and others from power in Yunnan. Although the mutiny failed, Chang resigned from Yunnan politics. He became a councilor and legislator of the Civil Affairs Office, and served as Secretary General of the Legislative Yuan from 28 May 1932 to 14 January 1933. He became deputy minister of the Ministry of the Interior in 1939. After the end of the Second Sino-Japanese War, he returned to Yunnan and was elected as a representative to the National Assembly.

After the Kuomintang defeat in the Chinese Civil War in 1949, Chang left for Taiwan. He then went to British Hong Kong to teach at New Asia College, before returning to Taiwan in 1950. He became Vice President of the Control Yuan in 1965.

Chang became acting President of the Control Yuan after incumbent Lee Shih-tsung died of a heart attack on 15 May 1972, a position he held concurrently with the office of Vice President of the Control Yuan. He resigned from both positions on 19 March 1973 and later became the first director of the Chinese Institute of Poetry.

Chang died from pneumonia at the Tri-Service General Hospital in Neihu District, Taipei on the morning of 1 September 1979 at the age of 92.
