= Yu Chun-hsien =

Taiwanese politician (1901–1994)

- 余俊賢
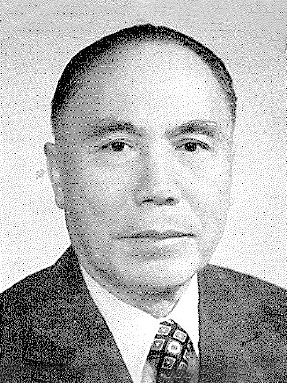

5th President of the Control Yuan
- In office 19 March 1973 – 11 March 1987
- President: Chiang Kai-shek; Yen Chia-kan; Chiang Ching-kuo
- Preceded by: Lee Shih-tsung; Chang Wei-han (Acting)
- Succeeded by: Huang Tsun-chiu

Personal details
- Born: 31 December 1901 Pingyuan County, Jiaying, Guangdong, Qing dynasty
- Died: 21 January 1994 (aged 92) Taipei, Taiwan
- Party: Kuomintang

Chinese name
- Traditional Chinese: 余俊賢
- Simplified Chinese: 余俊贤
Transcriptions
Standard Mandarin
- Hanyu Pinyin: Yú Jùnxián
- Bopomofo: ㄩˊㄐㄩㄣˋㄒㄧㄢˊ
- Wade–Giles: Yü^{2} Chün^{4}-hsien^{2}
Hakka
- Pha̍k-fa-sṳ: Yì Chun-hiàn
Yue: Cantonese
- Jyutping: Jyu^{4} Zeon^{3}-jin^{4}
Southern Min
- Tâi-lô: Û Chùn-hiân

Yu Chun-hsien (Chinese: 余俊賢; pinyin: Yú Jùnxián; 31 December 1901 – 21 January 1994) was a Taiwanese politician. He served as the President of the Control Yuan from 1973 to 1987.

== Biography ==
During his studies at Sun Yat-sen University (then known as National Kwangtung University), Yu often listened to Sun Yat-sen's speeches on the Three Principles of the People. Yu was deeply influenced by Sun Yat-sen's thought and he joined the Kuomintang in 1925.

In 1926 Yu became the Secretary of the Organization Department of the Central Executive Committee of the Kuomintang and later participated in overseas party affairs, specifically the Dutch East Indies. He served as the editor-in-chief of the Indonesian Republic of China Daily (民國日報). Yu was arrested and imprisoned for 8 months for criticizing the Japanese government for obstructing the Northern Expedition. He returned to Nanjing soon after.

In 1949, Yu retreated to Taiwan following the Nationalist defeat in the Chinese Civil War. In 1973, he was elected as the President of the Control Yuan. He served as president until 1987, when he resigned due to old age. After leaving office, he served as a senior adviser to the Presidential Office Building.

Yu died of illness in 1994. President Lee Teng-hui issued a statement acklowedging Yu's death.
