= Wang Tso-jung =

Taiwanese politician (1919-2013)

- 王作榮
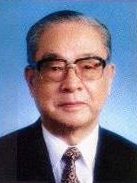
- Wang Tso-jung in 1996

President of the Control Yuan
- In office 1 September 1996 – 1 February 1999
- Preceded by: Chen Li-an; Cheng Shuei-chih (acting)
- Succeeded by: Fredrick Chien

Minister of Examination
- In office August 1990 – August 1996
- Preceded by: Chu Shao-hua
- Succeeded by: Chen Chin-jang

Personal details
- Born: 6 February 1919 Hanchuan, Hubei, Republic of China
- Died: 30 July 2013 (aged 94) Beitou, Taipei, Taiwan
- Party: Kuomintang
- Education: National Central University (BA); University of Washington (MA); Vanderbilt University (MA)

Wang Tso-jung (Chinese: 王作榮; pinyin: Wáng Zuòróng; 6 February 1919 – 30 July 2013) was a Taiwanese politician who served as President of the Control Yuan from 1996 to 1999.

He earned a master's degree in economics from the University of Washington and Vanderbilt University in the United States and taught at National Taiwan University.

A longtime member of the Kuomintang, Wang was close to Yu Chi-chung.

Wang was awarded the Order of Propitious Clouds in June 2013. He died of sepsis on 30 July 2013 at Taipei Veterans General Hospital, where he had undergone treatment for pneumonia. His eldest son Wang Nien-tsu became an engineer and entrepreneur.

== Works ==
- 財經文存三編, China Times Publishing Co., 1989

Government offices
Preceded by Chen Li-an; Cheng Shuei-chih (acting)	President of Control Yuan; 1996–1999	Succeeded by Fredrick Chien
