= Lee Shih-tsung =

Taiwanese politician (1898–1972)

- 李嗣璁
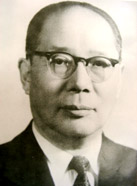

President of the Control Yuan
- In office 10 November 1964 – 15 May 1972
- Preceded by: Yu Youren
- Succeeded by: Chang Wei-han (acting); Yu Chun-hsien

Personal details
- Born: 7 December 1898 Qingyun County, Tianjin Fu, Zhili, Qing dynasty
- Died: 15 May 1972 (aged 73) Beitou District, Taipei, Taiwan
- Party: Kuomintang
- Education: Peking University (BS)

Lee Shih-tsung (Chinese: 李嗣璁; pinyin: Lǐ Sìcōng; 7 December 1898 - 15 May 1972), courtesy name Yinqiao (蔭翹), art name Wuzhen (武真), was a Taiwanese politician who served as the 2nd President of the Control Yuan from 1964 to 1972 (acting from 1964 to 1965 due to the death of Yu Youren).

== Biography ==
Lee Shih-tsung was born in 1898. In 1923, he graduated from the Department of Physics of Peking University. Soon after, Lee joined the Kuomintang and handled party affairs in Shanxi. For example, in 1929, he served as the secretary-general of the second congress of the Shanxi Provincial Party Headquarters of the Kuomintang.

In 1934, he became a member of the Control Yuan. In 1948, Lee was re-elected to the Control Yuan, and escaped to Taiwan the following year. In 1958, he became the vice-president of the Control Yuan, and in 1965, officially became the president of the Control Yuan.

Lee died of a heart attack in 1972.

Government offices
Preceded by Yu Youren	President of Control Yuan; 1964–1972	Succeeded by Chang Wei-han (acting); Yu Chun-hsien
