= Lay judges in Taiwan =

Lay judges in Taiwan are regulated by the Citizen Judges Act (國民法官法) passed by the Legislative Yuan in July 2020 and were introduced in January 2023.

== Background ==
In her second inaugural address, President Tsai Ing-wen discussed implementing a lay judge system. Subsequently, the preparatory committee for the second National Conference on Judicial Reform was convened in November 2016, following the first conference in July 1999, which led to amendments of the Code of Criminal Procedure in February 2003.

The 2016–2017 conference considered a number of proposals, including decriminalizing defamation to protect freedom of speech, extending protections offered to judicial victims, independent evaluation of judicial performance, and more amendments to the Code of Criminal Procedure and Implementation Rules of the Code of Criminal Procedure, drafts of which were approved in July 2019.

Throughout the tenure of the second National Conference on Judicial Reform, judicial reform advocacy organizations continued backing a transition to the jury system. Specific concerns with the lay judge system included potential political and monetary influence via the career judges sharing the bench, or that the opinions of the professional judges would influence decisions of their lay counterparts.

Lay participation was also introduced into the discipline of judges. Amendments to the Judges Act passed in 2019, which took effect in July 2020, added two lay members, chosen from scholars and other members of the public, to the first-instance panels of the Disciplinary Chamber of the Judiciary that hear disciplinary cases against judges.

== Citizen Judges Act ==
Bills regarding a lay judge system proposed by the Judicial Yuan were not voted upon in the previous legislative session, leading the Executive Yuan to propose a similar bill for discussion in March 2020. The Judicial Yuan also suggested another draft act for citizen participation in criminal trial procedures, stating that the lay judge system allowed citizens to be active in deciding verdicts and sentences, while eliminating hung juries. Cross-caucus negotiations took place throughout July, necessitating an extraordinary session of the Legislative Yuan to be convened. The 113 articles of the Citizen Judges Act passed a third legislative reading on 22 July 2020. Upon its passage, the Citizen Judges Act was described as "a major landmark" for judicial reform by Judicial Yuan president Hsu Tzong-li, and by Tsai Ing-wen as "a new era of people's participation in the...judiciary." The Citizen Judges Act took effect on 1 January 2023. In the act, lay judges are described as national judges. At the district court level, six lay judges would review premeditated crimes leading to death, or crimes requiring imprisonment of ten years or more, alongside three career judges. Six of the nine judges, including one career judge, must concur for a guilty verdict. The same majority must concur for a death penalty to be decided. Lay judges are barred from hearing court cases involving minors or drug charges. To serve as a lay judge, one must be a citizen of the Republic of China, be at least 23 years old, have completed a high school education or equivalent, and have lived within the jurisdiction of the district court for four months. Those with a criminal record cannot serve as a lay judge. Under the Citizen Judges Act, exemptions from service may be granted to educators, students, those above 70 years of age, people with health conditions that could be exacerbated by participation in legal proceedings, or those with difficulty setting aside home and work duties.

=== Implementation of the act ===
After a series of trial simulations were held, an initiative to recruit eligible and randomly selected citizens to serve as lay judges was announced in April 2022 by the head judge of the Judicial Yuan's Disciplinary Court, Peng Hsing-ming. In July 2023, the New Taipei District Court became the first court in Taiwan to issue a ruling made by lay and professional judges, per the Citizen Judges Act. In September 2025, the same court issued the first ruling by lay and professional judges resulting in capital punishment. The first corruption case is to be heard by lay judges of the Taipei District Court in 2026.
