= List of presidents of the Control Yuan =

President of Control Yuan
- Seal of the Control Yuan since 2021

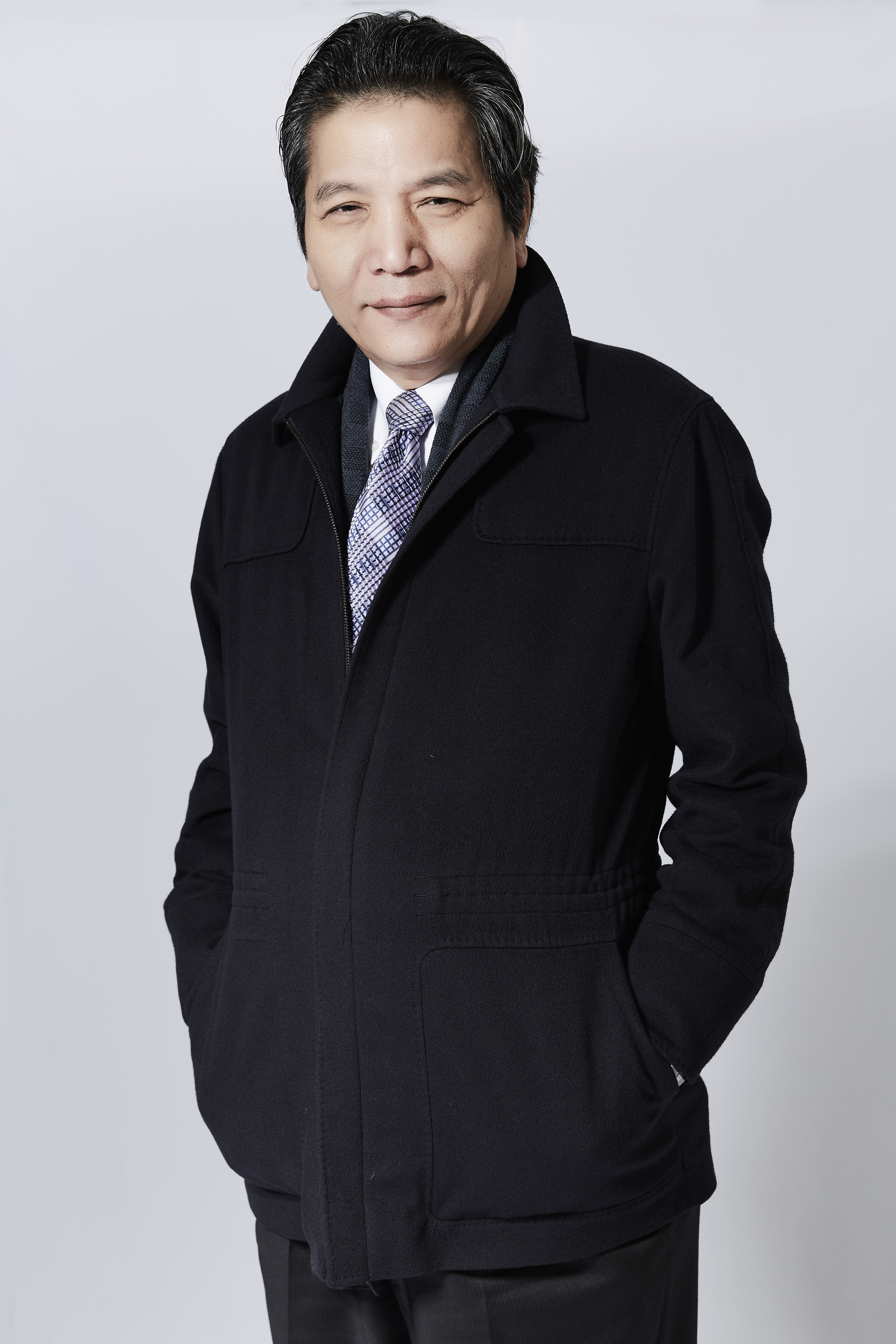
- Incumbent; Lee Hung-chun (acting) since 10 February 2025
- Nominator: President
- Appointer: Legislative Yuan
- Term length: 6 years
- Inaugural holder: Yu You-ren
- Formation: 9 June 1928; 98 years ago
- Website: www.cy.gov.tw

This is a list of presidents of the Control Yuan of the Republic of China.

== List ==
Kuomintang (Nationalist) New Party Non-Partisan Solidarity Union Democratic Progressive Party

=== Before the 1947 Constitution ===
During the Nationalist government era, the President of Control Yuan was appointed by the Central Committee of the Kuomintang (Nationalist Party).

- Period: 1928 – 1948

№	Portrait	Name (Birth–Death)	Took office	Left office	Term	Political party	Chairman
1		Cai Yuan-pei (Note: Did not take office.) 蔡元培; Caì Yuánpeí (1868–1940)	8 October 1928	28 August 1929	—	Kuomintang	Tan Yankai (KMT)
1		Cai Yuan-pei 蔡元培; Caì Yuánpeí (1868–1940)	8 October 1928	28 August 1929	—	Kuomintang	Chiang Kai-shek (KMT)
2		Zhao Dai-wen 趙戴文; Zhaò Daìwén (1867–1943)	29 August 1929	17 November 1930	—	Kuomintang	Chiang Kai-shek (KMT)
3		Yu You-ren (Note: Longest serving president of a Yuan.) 于右任; Yǘ Yoùrèn (1879–1964)	18 November 1930	9 June 1948	—	Kuomintang	Chiang Kai-shek (KMT)
3		Yu You-ren 于右任; Yǘ Yoùrèn (1879–1964)	18 November 1930	9 June 1948	—	Kuomintang	Lin Sen (KMT)
3		Yu You-ren 于右任; Yǘ Yoùrèn (1879–1964)	18 November 1930	9 June 1948	—	Kuomintang	Chiang Kai-shek (KMT)

=== After the 1947 Constitution (indirect elections) ===
The Control Yuan was a parliamentary chamber under the 1947 Constitution of the Republic of China. The first Control Yuan election was held indirectly by provincial and municipal assemblies between 1947 and 1948. However, the government retreated to Taiwan in 1949. Members of the first Control Yuan had their terms extended indefinitely and sessions of the first Control Yuan were conducted in Taiwan until December 31, 1991 while the supplementary members kept serving until January 31, 1993. The President of the Control Yuan was elected by and from the members like the speaker of many other parliamentary bodies.

- Period: 1948 – 1993

№	Portrait	Name (Birth–Death)	Took office	Left office	Term	Electoral mandates (Supplementary elections)	Political party	President
3		Yu You-ren (Note: Died in office.) 于右任; Yǘ Yoùrèn (1879–1964); MCY for Shensi at-large	9 June 1948	9 November 1964	1	1948	Kuomintang	Chiang Kai-shek (KMT)
–		Lee Shih-tsung (Note: As acting.) 李嗣璁; Lǐ Sìcōng (1898–1972); MCY for Hopeh at-large	10 November 1964	16 August 1965	1	—	Kuomintang	Chiang Kai-shek (KMT)
4		Lee Shih-tsung 李嗣璁; Lǐ Sìcōng (1898–1972); MCY for Hopeh at-large	17 August 1965	14 May 1972	1	1948, 1969	Kuomintang	Chiang Kai-shek (KMT)
–		Chang Wei-han 張維翰; Zhāng Weíhàn (1886–1979); MCY for Yunnan at-large	15 May 1972	18 March 1973	1	1948, 1969, 1973	Kuomintang	Chiang Kai-shek (KMT)
5		Yu Chun-hsien 余俊賢; Yǘ Jǜnxían (1901–1994); MCY for Kwangtung at-large	19 March 1973	11 March 1987	1	1948, 1969, 1980; 1948, 1969, 1987	Kuomintang	Chiang Kai-shek (KMT)
5		Yu Chun-hsien 余俊賢; Yǘ Jǜnxían (1901–1994); MCY for Kwangtung at-large	19 March 1973	11 March 1987	1	1948, 1969, 1980; 1948, 1969, 1987	Kuomintang	Yen Chia-kan (KMT)
5		Yu Chun-hsien 余俊賢; Yǘ Jǜnxían (1901–1994); MCY for Kwangtung at-large	19 March 1973	11 March 1987	1	1948, 1969, 1980; 1948, 1969, 1987	Kuomintang	Chiang Ching-kuo (KMT)
6		Huang Tsun-chiu (Note: First Yuan president of Taiwanese ancestry.) 黃尊秋; Huáng Zūnqiū (1923–2000); MCY for Taiwan at-large	12 March 1987	31 January 1993	1	–	Kuomintang	Chiang Ching-kuo (KMT)
6		Huang Tsun-chiu 黃尊秋; Huáng Zūnqiū (1923–2000); MCY for Taiwan at-large	12 March 1987	31 January 1993	1	–	Kuomintang	Lee Teng-hui (KMT)

=== After the 1947 Constitution (presidential nomination) ===
Since the 2nd constitutional amendment in 1992, the Control Yuan was redesigned as a commission-style agency. The President of Control Yuan was nominated by the President of the Republic and approved by the parliament of Taiwan (initially by the National Assembly, currently by the Legislative Yuan).

- Period: 1993 – present

№	Portrait	Name (Birth–Death)	Took office	Left office	Term	Political party	President
7		Chen Li-an (Note: Grandson of Tan Yankai.) 陳履安; Chén Lǚ'ān (1937– )	1 February 1993	22 September 1995 (Note: Resigned to run for president.)	2	Kuomintang	Lee Teng-hui (KMT)
–		Cheng Shuei-chih 鄭水枝; Zhèng Shuǐzhī (1926–2020)	23 September 1995	31 August 1996	2	Kuomintang	Lee Teng-hui (KMT)
8		Wang Tso-yung 王作榮; Wáng Zuòróng (1919–2013)	1 September 1996	31 January 1999	2	Kuomintang	Lee Teng-hui (KMT)
9		Fredrick Chien 錢復; Qián Fù (1935– )	1 February 1999	31 January 2005	3	Kuomintang	Lee Teng-hui (KMT)
9		Fredrick Chien 錢復; Qián Fù (1935– )	1 February 1999	31 January 2005	3	Kuomintang	Chen Shui-bian (DPP)
Post vacant							Chen Shui-bian (DPP)
Post vacant							Ma Ying-jeou (KMT)
10		Wang Chien-shien (Note: First New Party president of a Yuan.) 王建煊; Wáng Jiànxuān (1938– )	1 August 2008	31 July 2014	4	New	Ma Ying-jeou (KMT)
11		Chang Po-ya (Note: First female president of a Yuan.) 張博雅; Zhāng Bóyǎ (1942– )	1 August 2014	31 July 2020	5	Non-Partisan Solidarity Union	Ma Ying-jeou (KMT)
11		Chang Po-ya 張博雅; Zhāng Bóyǎ (1942– )	1 August 2014	31 July 2020	5	Non-Partisan Solidarity Union	Tsai Ing-wen (DPP)
12		Chen Chu (Note: First DPP President of the Control Yuan.) 陳菊; Chén Jú (1950– )	1 August 2020	1 February 2026	6	Democratic Progressive (membership temporarily suspended)	Tsai Ing-wen (DPP)
12		Chen Chu 陳菊; Chén Jú (1950– )	1 August 2020	1 February 2026	6	Democratic Progressive (membership temporarily suspended)	Lai Ching-te (DPP)
-		Lee Hung-chun 李鴻鈞; Lǐ Hóng'jūn (1959– )	10 February 2025 (Note: On behalf of Chen Chu until 1 February 2026.)	Incumbent	6	Independent	Lai Ching-te (DPP)

== See also ==
- List of political office-holders of the Republic of China by age
