= Yu Yu-jen =

Chinese scholar and politician (1879–1964)

Yu Yu-jen Yu Youren 于右任
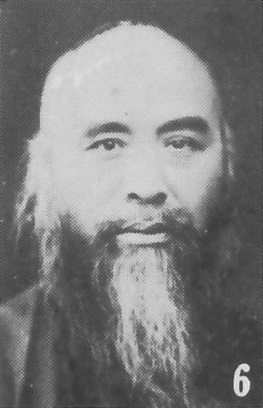
- Yu Yu-jen as pictured in The Most Recent Biographies of Chinese Dignitaries
- Born: Yu Po-hsun (于伯循, also romanized as Yu Boxun in Hanyu Pinyin); April 11, 1879; Hedaogang, Sanyuan County, Shaanxi, Qing China
- Died: November 10, 1964 (aged 85); Taipei Veterans General Hospital, Taipei City, Republic of China
- Occupations: Educator, Calligrapher, Politician
- Relatives: Lawrence Lau (grandson)
- Writing career
- Period: Republican China

Yu Yu-jen (Chinese: 于右任; pinyin: Yú Yòurèn, also romanized as Yu Youren in Hanyu Pinyin; April 11, 1879 – November 10, 1964) was a Chinese educator, scholar, calligrapher, and politician.

== Early life ==
He was born on April 11, 1879, in the town of Hedaogang (Chinese: 河道港), Sanyuan County (north of Xi'an), Shaanxi Province, Qing China. His father was Xin Sangong and his mother surnamed Zhao. In 1880, while his father was on business in Sichuan, his mother died and so his aunt brought him to live with her in the village of Yangfu where they lived together for 9 years. After a short stint as a goat herder, he went to a private school at the Mawang Temple in Yangfu and studied under Mr. Diwu. In 1889, he returned with his aunt to Sanyuan and entered the school of Mao Banxiang, under whom he began to study archaic and modern forms of poetry. On occasion, he also had the chance to read a few poems by such Southern Song patriots as Wen Tianxiang and Xie Fangde. At the age of 17, he came in first place on entrance examinations and went on to study at the schools like the Dao Academy in Sanyuan, Weijing Academy in Jingyang, and Guanzhong Academy. In 1898, he married Miss Gao Zhonglin.

== Revolutionary beginnings ==
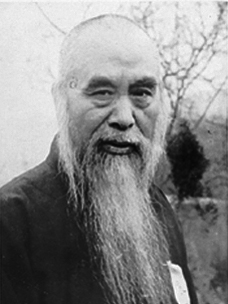
Yu Yu-jen

In 1900, at the age of 22, Yu Yu-jen wrote a letter for the Pacification Commissioner of Shaanxi, Cen Chunxuan, imploring him to take the opportunity of assassinating the Empress Dowager Cixi who was fleeing to Xi'an during the Boxer Rebellion, which would provide the impetus for true reform of the government, but Yu was stopped from sending it by his classmate Wang Linsheng. Yu wrote many poems venting anger and frustration with the government. These were collected into a book entitled Poetry Drafts from the Hall of Tears and Mockery. His friend Meng Yimin helped Yu to have it published.

In 1903, he passed the civil service examinations to become a Provincial Graduate (juren), but due to the satiric contents of Poetry Drafts from the Hall of Tears and Mockery, the government branded him a revolutionary. Wanted by the Qing government, Yu fled and sought refuge in Shanghai. With help from Ma Xiangbo, he was able to enter the Aurora Academy (later Aurora University) under the assumed named of Liu Xueyu. Along with Ye Zhongyu and others, Yu established the Fudan College (now Fudan University) in memory of his days at Aurora (using the same character dan in Zhendan, the Chinese name of Aurora, and adding the character fu, for "reviving" China). Ma Xiangbo was elected as school president.

In 1906, Yu fled to Japan and while there was able to meet Sun Yat-sen and the Tongmenghui through the introduction of Kang Xinfu and he thereafter officially joined the Tongmenghui. After returning to China in 1907, Yu started a newspaper called The National Herald (also known as the Shenzhou Daily), but its facilities were destroyed in a fire less than a year later. Yu's father died the following year. In March 1909, Yu established another newspaper called The People's Voice (Minzhu Bao) in Shanghai, strongly condemning the culture of corruption in government. Attracting the attention of officials, he was arrested and sent to jail, and the newspaper was closed in June 1909. Released from jail and still undaunted, he established another newspaper called The People's Sigh (Minxu Bao) but less than two months later it was shut down and he was thrown in jail again. In 1910, he established yet another newspaper called the Min Li Pai, the offices of which virtually served as the contact headquarters for the Tongmenghui.

== Post Xinhai Revolution ==
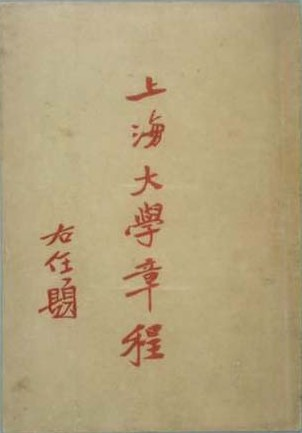
Calligraphy by Yu Yu-jen: "Shanghai University Charter"

In 1912, Yu Yu-jen was nominated to the post of Deputy Minister of Transportation and Communication, but less than three months later was forced to resign along with Sun Yat-sen's government. After Yuan Shikai took control of the government and the Min Li Bao was shut down, Yu was placed on the wanted list by Yuan Shikai's government. In 1918, Yu returned to his native Shaanxi Province, where he became commander of forces responsible for revolutionary activities in the northwest. In 1922, his post as commander was disbanded and he returned to Shanghai where he established Shanghai University along with Ye Chucang and assumed the post as president of the school. In 1925, he was ordered to organize along with Wu Zhihui, Wang Jingwei, and others the political affairs committee to handle party affairs. In 1927, Yu became a standing member of the Nationalist government committee. In the following year, he was also appointed as the Director of Audit. In 1932, Yu assumed the post of Director of the Control Yuan.

In 1936, Yu collected examples of Chinese characters and compiled them into the Thousand character essay in Standard Cursive Script as the book Standard Cursive Script, the first edition of which was published. Yu also donated his entire collection of more than three hundred rubbings from stele to the Xi'an Forest of Stele Museum.

In 1941, along with other members of the art and cultural world, Yu took the initiative to name the fifth day of the fifth lunar month as Poets' Day. Yu also met the modern painting master Zhang Daqian at Dunhuang in Northwest China and came to realize the amount of destruction that had occurred to the art and cultural heritage at Dunhuang. After returning to the government headquarters in Chongqing, he immediately proposed that a Dunhuang Art Academy be established.

Following the loss of mainland China to Communist forces in 1949, Yu followed the Chinese Nationalist government to the island of Taiwan, which the Chinese government took from Japan at the end of World War II in 1945, at the age of 71.

== In the Republic of China after exile ==
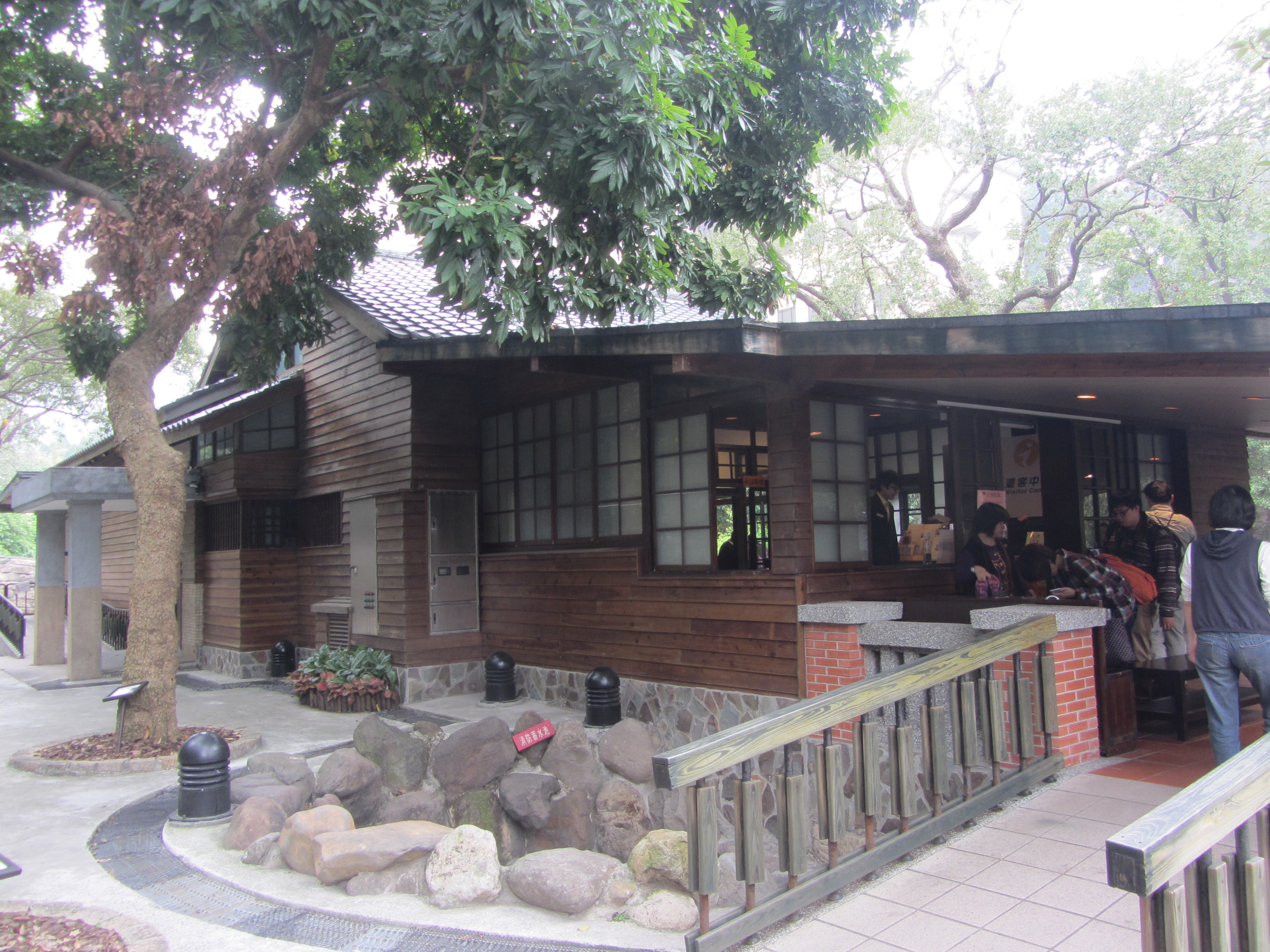
Yu former residence in Taipei which has now become the Beitou Plum Garden.

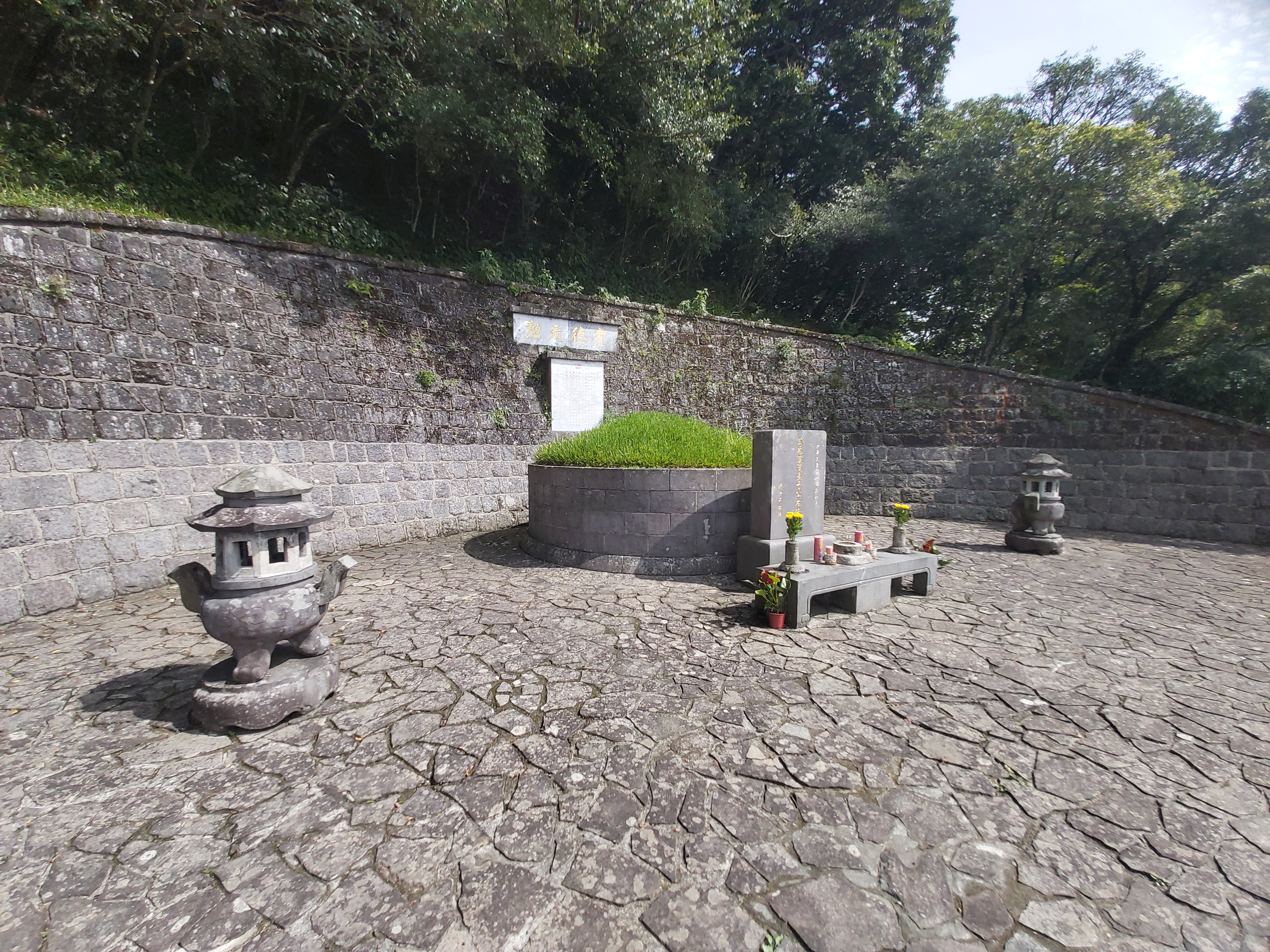
Tomb of Yu Yu-jen at Yangmingshan National Park, Taipei.

In 1950, after the establishment of the Kuomintang (Chinese Nationalist Party) committee, Yu became a member of its review committee. In 1956, Yu received the first National Literary Award presented by the Ministry of Education. In arranging his diaries in 1962, Yu wrote poetry revealing pain at not being able to return to his hometown in Shaanxi. Yu died from pneumonia in 1964 at Taipei Veterans General Hospital and in 1967 his remains were interred at Datun Mountain in Taipei's Yangmingshan National Park. In 1966 a large bronze statue of Yu Yu-jen was placed at the summit of Yushan. The statue remained there until 1996 when it was cut down and thrown into a ravine by Taiwan independence activists.

== Calligraphy ==
Yu was a scholar of calligraphy and is regarded as one China's modern masters. His works in cursive and semi-cursive manner are intensely animated. He is perhaps best known for his calligraphy and published related works on the topic. Because his later years were spent in Taiwan, his writing style is very popular and his works are considered very desirable by collectors. Yu completed numerous inkworks, stone carvings, and title plaques while living in Taipei including works for the National Museum of History, Din Tai Fung, Xingtiang Temple, and the Shilin Official Residence.

The Pamir Snow Gnawing Association (帕米爾齧雪同志會) established a cultural park known as the Pamir Cultural Park in a quiet and secluded mountainous area of Taipei City called Wuzhishan. The park commemorates about 300 KMT soldiers who hid out in the Pamir Mountains after the Chinese Civil War and were able to eventually escape to Taiwan. It had engraved at the site examples of the titles and poetry of Yu Yu-jen into stones and rocky outcroppings, forming a beautiful outdoor garden of his calligraphy. Among the hills of the area is an open space where the association erected a monument. Each of the characters for the title calligraphed by Yu Yu-jen was engraved into individual slabs of marble and then inlaid into a concrete pillar.

== Gallery ==
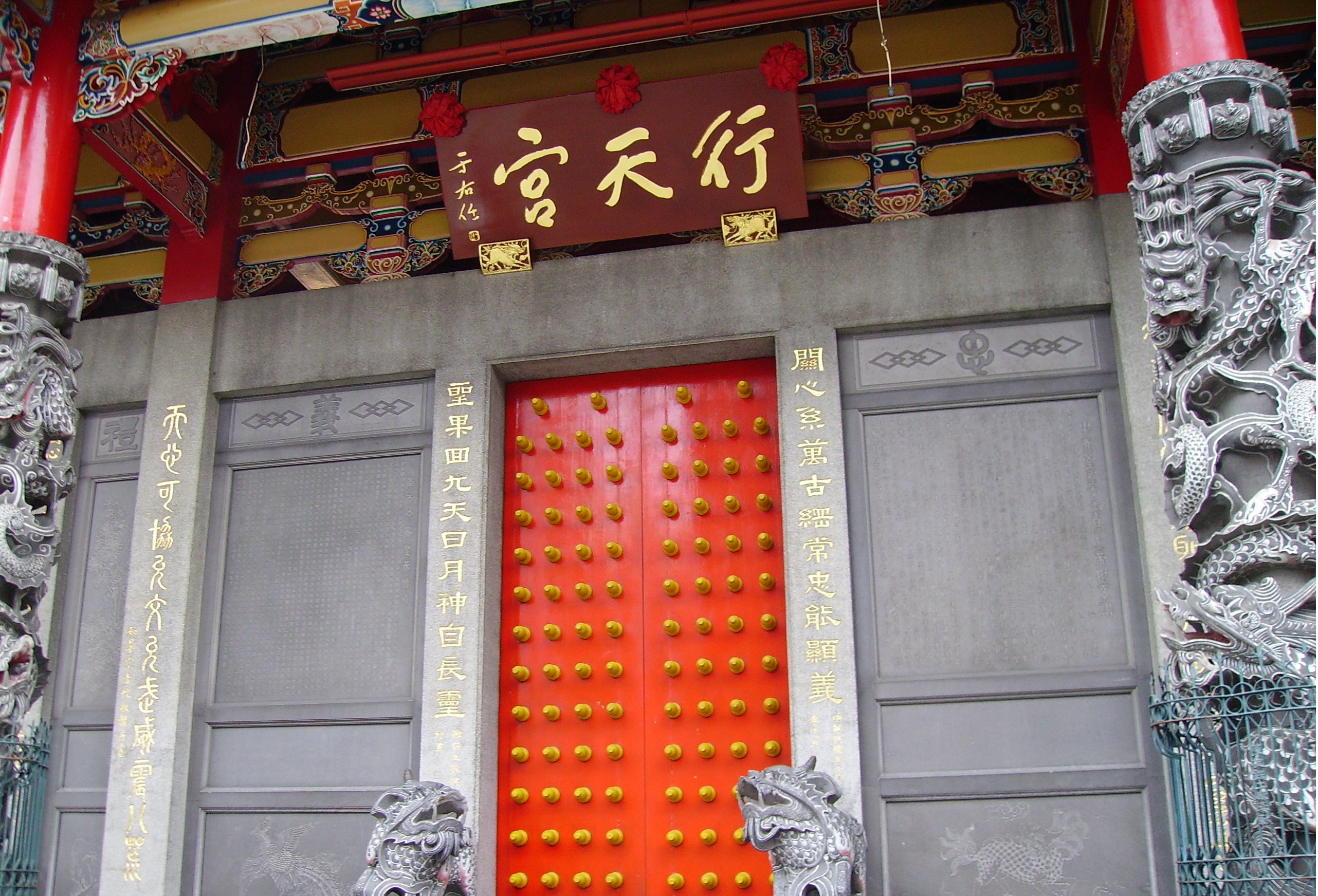
Title Plaque by Yu Yu-jen at Xingtian Temple in Taipei

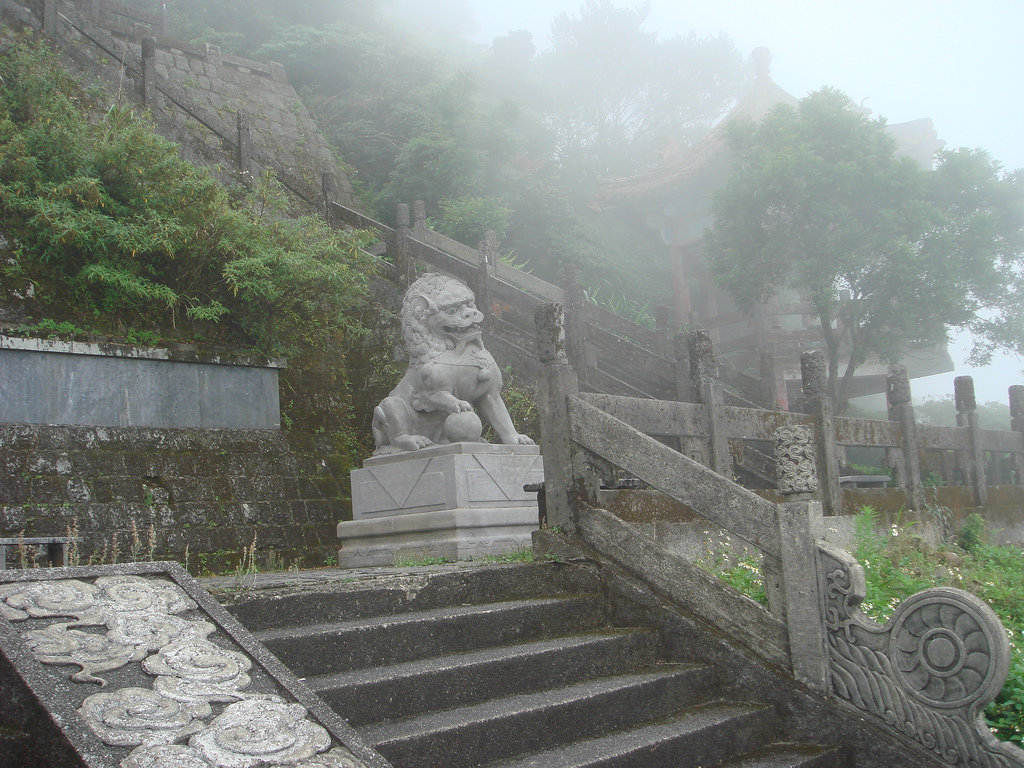
Chinese guardian lions at the entrance to the Tomb of Yu Yu-jen Yangmingshan National Park, Taipei

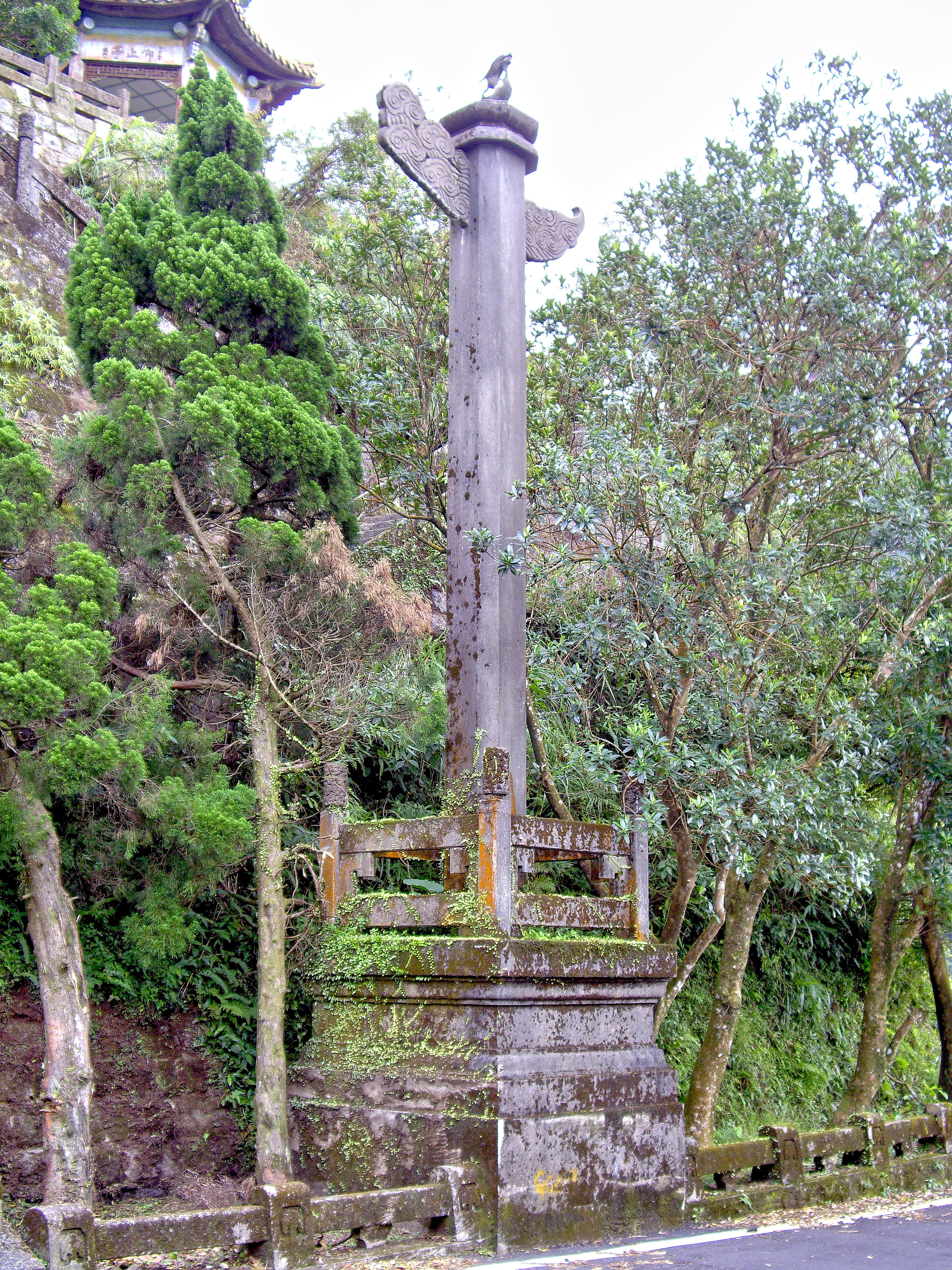
Shendaozhu at the tomb of Yu Yu-jen in Yangmingshan National Park, Taipei

== See also ==
- Lawrence Lau - Yu Yu-jen's Grandson.
- Puru (artist)
- Chang Dai-chien
- Chatham Square, Manhattan

Government offices
Preceded by Zhao Daiwen	President of Control Yuan; 1930–1964	Succeeded by Lee Shih-tsung
