= Hsu Li-teh =

Politician of Taiwan

- 徐立德
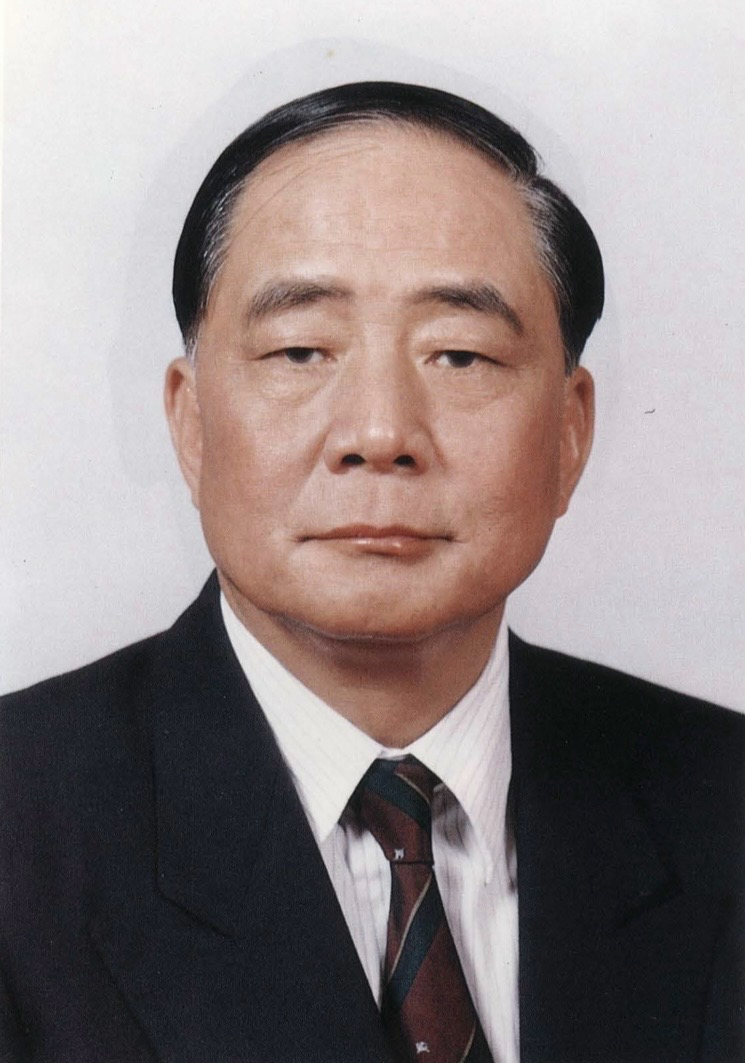

Minister of Council for Economic Planning and Development of the Republic of China
- In office 15 December 1994 – 10 June 1996
- Preceded by: Vincent Siew
- Succeeded by: Chiang Pin-kung

Vice Premier of the Republic of China
- In office 27 February 1993 – 1 September 1997
- Premier: Lien Chan
- Preceded by: Shih Chi-yang
- Succeeded by: John Chiang

Minister of Economic Affairs of the Republic of China
- In office 28 May 1984 – 13 March 1985
- Preceded by: Chao Yao-tung
- Succeeded by: Lee Ta-hai

Minister of Finance of the Republic of China
- In office 25 November 1981 – 28 May 1984
- Preceded by: Chang Chi-cheng
- Succeeded by: Lu Reng-kong

Personal details
- Born: 6 August 1931 (age 94) Wuhan, Hubei, Republic of China
- Party: Kuomintang
- Education: National Taipei University (BA); Taiwan Provincial School of Legislation and Business (BBA); National Chengchi University (MA); Harvard University (MPA)

Hsu Li-teh (Chinese: 徐立德; pinyin: Xú Lìdé; born 6 August 1931) is a Taiwanese politician. He was Vice Premier of the Republic of China from 1993 to 1997.

== Education ==
Hsu graduated from Cheng Kung Senior High School in 1949. He then earned a bachelor's degree in education from National Taipei University in 1953 and a B.B.A. degree from the Taiwan Provincial School of Legislation and Business in 1958. He then earned a master's degree in political science from National Chengchi University in 1960.

In 1962, Hsu studied in the United States at American University. He later returned to the U.S. to complete graduate studies at Harvard University, where he earned a Master of Public Administration (M.P.A.) from the Harvard Kennedy School in 1986.

== Political career ==
=== Mailiao power plant groundbreaking ceremony ===
Speaking at the groundbreaking ceremony for the construction of Taiwan's first independent power producer power plant, the Mailiao Power Plant in Mailiao Township, Yunlin County on 12 December 1996, Hsu said that the construction of Mailiao Power Plant showed the ROC government policy to liberalize the power generation industry in Taiwan. He added that this project also served as the model for other private companies to invest in power plants.

Hsu is widely noted for his close personal and political friendship with Lien Chan. In the foreword to Hsu's autobiography, Charles Kao (高希均) —then professor and later industry executive—summarised Hsu's political career as: "He (Hsu) devoted himself to public service for the sake of his friend and the nation; the friend refers to Lien Chan, and the nation refers to the Republic of China." The interview collection by Lu Keng and 馬西屏, Surely You're Joking, Mr. Teng-hui!, similarly characterises their relationship, observing that "Everyone in the political arena knows that Lien Chan's true right-hand man is Hsu Li-teh. Lien Chan confided fully in Hsu, and Hsu wholeheartedly assisted Lien. The two were as close as brothers, sharing an intimate bond." In the interview with Hsu included in Surely You're Joking, Mr. Teng-hui! by Lu Keng, Hsu devoted considerable discussion to his role in assisting Lien Chan, as well as remaining at Lien's side after the defeat in the 2000 presidential election to plan their next steps.
