= Lee Ta-hai =

Taiwanese politician and businessman (1919-1994)

- 李達海
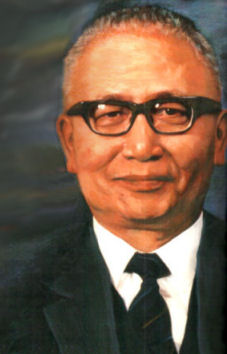

Minister of Economic Affairs of the Republic of China
- In office March 1985 – July 1988
- Preceded by: Hsu Li-teh
- Succeeded by: Chen Li-an

National policy advisor
- In office 1988–1990

Personal details
- Born: 6 March 1919 Haicheng, Liaoning, Republic of China
- Died: 13 November 1994 (aged 75) Taipei, Republic of China
- Party: Kuomintang

Lee Ta-hai (simplified Chinese: 李达海; traditional Chinese: 李達海; pinyin: Lǐ Dáhǎi; 6 March 1919 – 13 November 1994) was a Taiwanese politician and businessman. A former executive of the Chinese Petroleum Corporation, Lee was Minister of Economic Affairs under President Chiang Ching-kuo and continued to advise the Republic of China government under Chiang's successor, Lee Teng-hui.

== Political career ==
Prior to entering government, Lee was chairman of the state-owned Chinese Petroleum Corporation and oversaw the ROC government's petroleum monopoly. His tenure led to his appointment by Chiang Ching-kuo to the presidential cabinet, where he served as Minister of Economic Affairs through Chiang's death in 1988. The beginning of Lee's term was marked by growing pressure from the United States to reduce tariffs and trade barriers amidst a growing trade deficit in the U.S. As head of the ROC's economic policy, Lee presided over the gradual liberalization that characterized the later years of Chiang Ching-kuo's administration while balancing relations with the U.S. His refusal to allow the NT dollar to appreciate against the U.S. dollar, however, caused further friction with the American government and raised the threat of trade sanctions in 1987.

Although Chiang Ching-kuo died in January 1988, Lee continued to serve as Minister for another six months, after which he declined to pursue a seat in the Kuomintang Central Council. He continued to assist the KMT administration under Lee Teng-hui as National Policy Advisor. Lee also served as chairman of the country's largest research institute, the Industrial Technology Research Institute. In 1995, his autobiography, "石油一生" ("Oil as My Life"), was released posthumously.

Government offices
Preceded by Hsu Li-teh	ROC Minister of Economic Affairs; 1985–1988	Succeeded by Chen Li-an
