= Judges Act (Taiwan) =

Taiwanese statute governing judges and prosecutors

Judges Act 法官法

Legislative Yuan
- Citation: Presidential Order No. 10000141401 (6 July 2011)
- Territorial extent: Free area of the Republic of China
- Passed by: 7th Legislative Yuan
- Passed: 14 June 2011
- Signed by: Ma Ying-jeou
- Signed: 6 July 2011
- Commenced: 6 July 2012 (Chapter 5 from January 2012)

Amends
- 2019, 2020, 2021, 2022, 2023 (twice)

Related legislation
- Constitution, arts. 80–81; Disciplinary Court Organisation Act
- Status: In force

Judges Act
- Traditional Chinese: 法官法
Transcriptions
Standard Mandarin
- Hanyu Pinyin: Fǎguān Fǎ

The Judges Act (法官法) is a statute of the Republic of China (Taiwan) that governs the appointment, ethics, supervision, evaluation, discipline, remuneration and tenure of judges and, with modifications, of prosecutors. Passed by the Legislative Yuan on 14 June 2011 and promulgated on 6 July 2011, it defines the relationship between a judge and the state as a "special commission of judgeship" rather than an ordinary civil service relationship, and states its purposes as the protection of judicial independence and of the status of judges, and the establishment of a mechanism for evaluating them "in order to safeguard the right to a fair trial of the people".

The Act was adopted after some two decades of deliberation, in the aftermath of a 2010 bribery scandal in the Taiwan High Court, which led to the resignation of the President of the Judicial Yuan, and of public protests against lenient judgments in child sexual abuse cases. Alongside provisions on appointment, the conduct of judges and the self-government of the courts, it created two institutions that have dominated debate about it: the Judicial Evaluation Committee (法官評鑑委員會), a body that includes members from outside the judiciary and examines complaints against individual judges, and the Disciplinary Chamber of the Judiciary (職務法庭), (Note: The official English translation of the Act renders 職務法庭 as "Disciplinary Chamber of the Judiciary"; the Taipei Times has used "Court of the Judiciary". The chamber should be distinguished from the Disciplinary Court (懲戒法院), within which it has sat since 2020 and which also hears disciplinary cases against other public functionaries.) a specialised court that hears disciplinary cases against judges.

The Act has been amended six times. The most significant amendment, passed in 2019 after the 2016–2017 National Congress on Judicial Reform, enlarged the external membership of the Evaluation Committee, allowed litigants and victims of crime to petition it directly, permitted it to refer cases to the disciplinary court without first passing through the Control Yuan, and converted that court into a two-instance tribunal sitting with lay judges. In the first two years of the new system no petition brought directly by a litigant was upheld, although in 2022 the disciplinary court dismissed a former chairman of the Public Functionary Disciplinary Sanction Commission, the most senior judge yet disciplined under the Act. Official review and academic commentary have questioned how far the evaluation mechanism has achieved its aim of removing unfit judges, and how the accountability it introduced should be reconciled with the independence it was also designed to protect.

== Background ==
=== Constitutional framework ===
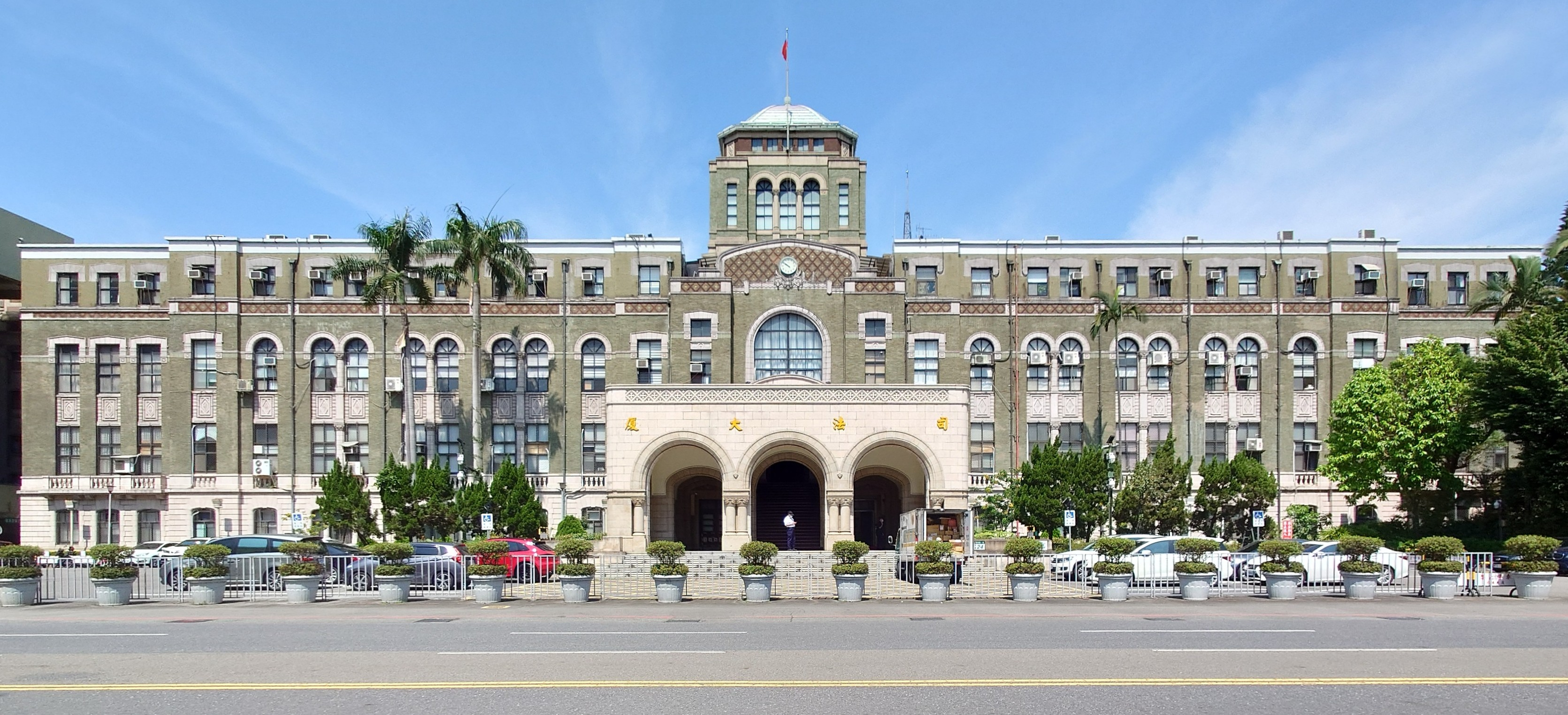
The Judicial Building in Taipei, seat of the Judicial Yuan

The Constitution of the Republic of China provides that judges "shall be above partisanship and shall, in accordance with law, hold trials independently, free from any interference" (Article 80), and that they "shall hold office for life" (life tenure). Under Article 81, no judge may be removed from office unless found guilty of a criminal offence, subjected to disciplinary measures or declared to be under interdiction, nor be suspended, transferred or have his or her salary reduced except in accordance with law.

=== Judicial personnel administration ===
Before the Act, personnel matters within the judiciary were handled by the Judicial Yuan's personnel review committee, on which elected judges sat alongside members appointed by the President of the Judicial Yuan. The political scientist Wang Chin-shou has described how reform-minded judges used that committee as an instrument of internal reform, and has argued that the resulting model of "internal democracy" within the judiciary and the prosecution service sat uneasily with the requirements of external democratic accountability. Ching-fang Hsu, drawing on interviews with sitting judges, has similarly argued that judicial independence in Taiwan developed through a number of interacting internal mechanisms, produced both by the collective action of ordinary judges and by reforms initiated by the Judicial Yuan, and that a structural tension persists between the decisional autonomy of individual judges and the administrative control of their performance.

Some scholars have traced the internal administration of the courts from the judicial independence movement launched by judges of the Taichung District Court in 1993. Examining among other things the personnel review committee, the review of draft judgments by superiors, the terms of court presidents and the transfer of judges, judicial ranks, administrative supervision and the return of the allocation of cases to councils of judges, they argue that judicial administration after democratisation shows three tendencies: less interference with adjudication, greater participation by junior judges, and increasingly rule-based and institutionalised procedures, which together have reduced judges' incentives to follow their superiors' instructions.

=== The 2010 crisis ===
In July 2010 three judges of the Taiwan High Court and a district prosecutor were detained on suspicion of accepting bribes in connection with the High Court's acquittal of the former Kuomintang legislator Ho Chih-hui (何智輝), whose conviction for receiving kickbacks had been overturned on appeal. The President of the Judicial Yuan, Lai In-jaw, tendered his resignation, saying that he was willing to take political responsibility "as the nation's judges are implicated". President Ma Ying-jeou accepted it on 18 July 2010, and the President of the Taiwan High Court also resigned.

In the same year a series of judgments in which defendants accused of sexually abusing young children were acquitted or lightly sentenced provoked widespread criticism of so-called "dinosaur judges" (恐龍法官), a pejorative for judges regarded as out of touch with society. On 25 September 2010 several thousand people gathered on Ketagalan Boulevard in Taipei in what became known as the White Rose Movement. Among the organisers' demands was the enactment of a law on the evaluation of judges and prosecutors, establishing a mechanism for removing unfit judges so that they would no longer be shielded by constitutional life tenure.

== Legislative history ==
=== Enactment ===
The Judges Act passed its third reading on 14 June 2011 after cross-party negotiation. Contemporary reporting presented the external evaluation mechanism as the first step of judicial reform and as a response to the White Rose Movement; at the last stage of negotiation the Kuomintang caucus agreed to admit external members to the Judicial Yuan's personnel review committee. The Act, comprising 103 articles, was promulgated by presidential order on 6 July 2011. Chapter 5, on judicial evaluation, entered into force six months after promulgation; Article 78, on retirement allowances, three years and six months after promulgation; and the remainder of the Act one year after promulgation.

=== The 2019 reform ===
The National Conference on Judicial Reform (司法改革國是會議), convened by the Office of the President between November 2016 and August 2017, reviewed the operation of the evaluation committees in its third working group. Its resolutions called for a larger and more diverse external membership, dedicated staff and an independent budget for the committees; for direct referral of serious cases to the Disciplinary Chamber without review by the Control Yuan; and for a right of members of the public to petition for evaluation directly, without the intermediation of bar associations or reform groups.

Pressure for reform of the disciplinary court itself was increased by the case of Chen Hung-pin (陳鴻斌), a former judge of the Taipei High Administrative Court accused of sexual harassment of his assistant. The Disciplinary Chamber had initially removed him from office, but in March 2018 a retrial panel substituted a fine of one year's salary, allowing him to keep his pension. The decision provoked public protest; the Control Yuan sought a further retrial, and on 14 February 2019 the chamber restored the order for removal, holding that the earlier retrial panel had been improperly constituted. The Judicial Yuan said at the time that it planned to convert the chamber to a two-instance system and to add two external members to its panels. An analysis by the Legislative Yuan's Legislative Research Bureau, prepared in May 2018 in response to the case, noted that the chamber had dealt with only 27 cases between 2012 and late 2015, while more than 97 per cent of judges had received "good" performance ratings over the same period. It observed that the Judicial Yuan had opposed the participation of lay assessors as possibly unconstitutional, but concluded that the Constitution does not require every member of a disciplinary panel to be a professional judge, and that lay members bound by a statutory duty of independence would not infringe Articles 80 and 81.

A draft amendment was proposed jointly by the Judicial Yuan, the Executive Yuan and the Examination Yuan. At a committee hearing on 24 April 2019 the Secretary-General of the Judicial Yuan, Lu Tai-lang, pledged to act against unfit judges, while the Judicial Yuan opposed a rival proposal that would have given its President the power to nominate and appoint every member of the Evaluation Committee. The legislature passed the amendment at an extraordinary session on 28 June 2019; it amended 33 articles, added 17 and repealed one. The Judicial Yuan described it as an important milestone in judicial reform, while opposition legislators criticised it as incomplete and insufficiently far-reaching to resolve public dissatisfaction with the courts. The amendment was promulgated on 17 July 2019; most of its provisions took effect one year later.

=== Later amendments ===
Subsequent amendments have been largely consequential on reforms elsewhere in the judicial system.

Legislative history of the Judges Act
Passed	Promulgated	Principal changes
14 June 2011	6 July 2011	Enactment (103 articles)
28 June 2019	17 July 2019	Reform of evaluation and discipline; 33 articles amended, 17 added and one (Article 31) repealed; most provisions in force one year after promulgation
22 May 2020	10 June 2020	Consequential amendments following the renaming of the Public Functionary Disciplinary Sanction Commission as the Disciplinary Court
30 December 2020	20 January 2021	Qualifications of prosecutors; renaming of prosecutors' offices
31 May 2022	22 June 2022	Qualifications of judges of the new district administrative litigation divisions of the High Administrative Courts (in force 15 August 2023)
11 April 2023	26 April 2023	Public hearings in the Disciplinary Chamber; renaming of the national bar association and of prosecutors' offices
5 December 2023	15 December 2023	Cross-references to the new civil service pension legislation

== Provisions ==
The Act is divided into eleven chapters.

Chapters of the Judges Act (as in force in 2026)
Chapter	Title (Note: Chapter titles follow the official English translation published by the Ministry of Justice.)	Articles
1	General Provisions	1–4
2	Appointment of Judges	5–12
3	Judicial Ethics and Supervision of Judges	13–23
4	Council of Judges	24–29
5	Judge's Evaluation	30–41-2
6	Protection of Judges	42–46
7	Disciplinary Chamber of the Judiciary	47–70
8	Remunerations for Judges	71–80
9	Studies, Continued Education, and Leaves for Judges	81–85
10	Prosecutors	86–96
11	Supplemental Provisions	97–103

=== General provisions (Articles 1–4) ===
For the purposes of the Act, "judge" means a Justice of the Judicial Yuan (that is, a member of the Constitutional Court), a judge of the Disciplinary Court, and a judge of any court, including judges on probation and judges in training. Provisions incompatible with the constitutional and statutory position of the Justices do not apply to them. Matters not regulated by the Act are governed by other laws, but provisions of existing laws on judges or prosecutors that conflict with the Act cease to apply.

The Act regulates the composition of the Judicial Personnel Review Committee (司法院人事審議委員會). Chaired by the President of the Judicial Yuan, it comprises eleven members designated by the President, twelve judges elected by their peers from the various levels of court, and three academic experts recommended by the Ministry of Justice and the national bar association. The academic members vote on appointment, removal, discipline and the conferral of tenure, but may only express opinions on other matters. Hsu Ching-fang observes that Article 4 preserved the existing balance of eleven designated members against twelve elected judges, seven of them from the district courts, so that the only substantial change was the admission of the three external members with a limited vote. The elected members have long posted the lists of personnel proposals on the judges' online forum about a week before each meeting, despite the Judicial Yuan's view that the lists should not be disclosed in advance; Hsu credits the practice with opening up a body once described as a rubber stamp.

=== Appointment (Articles 5–12) ===
The Act sets out the qualifications for appointment at each level of court. Besides candidates who have passed the national judges and prosecutors examination, it provides routes into the judiciary for experienced attorneys, public defenders, prosecutors, university law teachers and research fellows of Academia Sinica, with longer periods of experience required for appointment to the Supreme Court, the Supreme Administrative Court and the Disciplinary Court. Candidates who do not enter by examination are chosen by a Judicial Selection Committee, chaired by the President of the Judicial Yuan and composed of representatives of the Examination Yuan, judges, prosecutors, attorneys and academic and social representatives, at least one third of whom must be of each gender. The committee assesses each candidate's integrity, ability, physical and mental condition, work ethic, specialism and aspiration. Examination entrants serve five years as judges in training followed by one year on probation before receiving a substantive appointment. The presidents and division-chief judges of courts at the level of the High Court and below serve fixed terms of three years, ordinarily renewable once, and the Judicial Yuan must consult the judges of a court annually on the performance of its president. Fixed terms for division chiefs had first been introduced by a Judicial Yuan directive in 1995 and were strenuously resisted by division chiefs of the Taiwan High Court; Judicial Yuan Interpretation No. 539 upheld the scheme while observing that the matter was better regulated by statute, a basis the Act later supplied.

The routes into the judiciary other than examination were slow to take effect. Of the 329 judges appointed between 2012 and 2015, 96 (about 29 per cent) came through those routes, two thirds of them former prosecutors; relatively few attorneys and no academics transferred. In a 2016 report the Legislative Yuan's Budget Center criticised this record, recalling a resolution adopted with the Act that examination entrants should make up no more than 20 per cent of new judges once the Act had been in force for ten years.

=== Ethics and supervision (Articles 13–23) ===
Judges must adjudicate "in accordance with the Constitution and the laws, based on conscience, and not subject to any intervention", and must observe a Code of Conduct for Judges formulated by the Judicial Yuan in consultation with judges' representatives. They may not join political parties or take part in their activities, must resign before standing for elected office, and may not hold incompatible posts.

The Act distinguishes judicial independence from administrative supervision. Supervision is permitted only "to the extent that there is no influence on judicial independence" and is limited to preventing unlawful conduct, correcting improper speech or conduct, and urging the expeditious performance of duties. A court president may issue a judge with an order to take notice or with a warning, and a judge who considers that supervision has compromised his or her independence may challenge it before the Disciplinary Chamber of the Judiciary.

The chamber has drawn the protected sphere narrowly. In a later judgment it rejected a challenge by a judge of the Hualien District Court to a warning issued after she publicly accused her presiding judge of taking bribes, holding that judges enjoy the protection of independence only within the sphere of adjudication. Supervision also weighs most heavily on junior judges. The review of judgments by division chiefs and court presidents before delivery was abolished in 2005, but the Judicial Yuan retained review after delivery for judges in training, and Hsu found that such judges still routinely show their draft judgments to the presiding judge in advance.

=== Councils of judges (Articles 24–29) ===
Each court has a Council of Judges (法官會議), made up of all judges who actually hear cases, which resolves the annual allocation of judicial business and makes recommendations on evaluation and supervisory measures. If a court president considers a resolution on the allocation of business unlawful and the council reaffirms it by a qualified majority, the president may ask the Disciplinary Chamber of the Judiciary to declare it unlawful.

The councils grew out of the reform movement of the 1990s. Until the mid-1990s the allocation of business was in practice controlled by court presidents, although the Court Organization Act required it to be settled at a meeting of each court's president, division chiefs and judges; after collective action by reform-minded judges, the Judicial Yuan piloted councils in nine courts in 1995. Hsu concludes that the councils have become a substantive part of court governance but that, having been created to prevent arbitrary manipulation by court presidents, they are better suited to resisting interference than to managing the courts.

=== Judicial evaluation (Articles 30–41-2) ===
==== Grounds ====
Chapter 5 establishes the Judicial Evaluation Committee within the Judicial Yuan. A judge is subject to an "individual case evaluation" (個案評鑑) on seven grounds. These include obvious and serious errors in adjudication committed intentionally or with gross negligence which seriously infringe the rights of the people; serious breaches of the rules on political neutrality, incompatibility and confidentiality; serious violations of procedural or official rules; unjustified delay seriously prejudicing the parties; and serious violations of judicial ethics. The Act expressly provides that a judge's opinion on the application of law may not be the basis of an evaluation.

==== Composition ====
As enacted in 2011, the committee had eleven members: three judges, one prosecutor and three attorneys, each elected by their own profession, and four scholars and "impartial members of society" nominated by the Ministry of Justice and the national bar association and appointed by the President of the Judicial Yuan.

Since the 2019 amendments the committee has had thirteen members, the number of scholars and social representatives having been increased to six. Serving court presidents, chief prosecutors, bar association leaders, civil servants other than academic staff and political party staff are ineligible, and in appointing the scholars and social representatives the President of the Judicial Yuan must ensure that neither gender makes up less than one third of the committee.

==== Procedure ====
Under the original Act, petitions could be brought by three or more judges of the judge's own court, by the court or the corresponding prosecutors' office, by a bar association, or by a qualifying public-interest foundation or association; parties and victims of crime could only ask one of those bodies to petition on their behalf. If the committee found that a judge required discipline, the Judicial Yuan forwarded the case to the Control Yuan for possible impeachment. The Act also required the Judicial Yuan to carry out an unpublished comprehensive appraisal of every judge at least once every three years.

The 2019 amendments allow parties to concluded cases and victims of crime to petition the committee directly. Petitions must generally be lodged within three years, and the committee may consider related misconduct that was not the subject of the petition when this is necessary to establish a pattern of conduct. Where the committee finds that discipline is required, the Judicial Yuan now refers the case directly to the Disciplinary Chamber of the Judiciary and informs the Control Yuan; where it finds a breach that does not require discipline, the case goes to the Judicial Personnel Review Committee. The amendments also gave the judge and the petitioner rights to be heard and to inspect the materials gathered, required evaluations concerning a pending case to be stayed until the judge has disposed of it, and required the committee's resolutions to be published on its website. The comprehensive appraisal under Article 31 was abolished.

The evaluation chapter applies, with modifications, to prosecutors, whose evaluation committee is established within the Ministry of Justice and comprises three prosecutors, one judge, three attorneys and six scholars and social representatives.

=== Protection of tenure (Articles 42–46) ===
Chapter 6 gives statutory content to the constitutional guarantee of tenure. A tenured judge may be removed from office only following a final conviction for civil disturbance, treason or intentional abuse of office, a final sentence of imprisonment for another offence that is detrimental to the judgeship, or a declaration of guardianship. The Act enumerates the grounds on which a judge may be suspended, and prohibits transfer to a non-judicial post, to another region or to a different level of court without the judge's consent except on specified grounds. Those grounds were contested in 2012, when the Judicial Yuan transferred the Hualien judge and her presiding judge to other courts against their will on the ground that their continued presence was unsuitable. Six district-court members of the Personnel Review Committee walked out in protest and more than nine hundred judges signed a petition within three weeks, but the committee upheld the transfers on reconsideration.

A 2019 amendment, popularly called the "Chen Yu-chen clause" after a prosecutor convicted of corruption who had continued to draw half her salary during a six-year suspension, requires judges and prosecutors convicted of corruption, or removed or dismissed by the disciplinary court, to repay the basic salary received while suspended.

=== Disciplinary Chamber of the Judiciary (Articles 47–70) ===
==== Jurisdiction and organisation ====
The Disciplinary Chamber of the Judiciary hears disciplinary cases against judges, judges' complaints against the revocation of appointment, removal, suspension, discharge and involuntary transfer, and claims that supervisory measures have impaired judicial independence. No administrative litigation lies against its decisions.

In its original form the chamber was established by the Judicial Yuan and sat as a single-instance panel of five: the head of the Public Functionary Disciplinary Sanction Commission as presiding judge, and four judges with at least ten years' experience as tenured judges. Writing in 2015, one commentator contrasted this chamber, whose judges were chosen by the Judicial Selection Committee on the nomination of the President of the Judicial Yuan and which was supervised by the Judicial Yuan while adjudicating matters that concerned it, with the German model of a disciplinary court founded on judicial self-government, and asked whether the arrangement was consistent with the President's ultimate responsibility for the judicial power. Hsu doubted whether a panel of five senior judges, presided over by the head of the Commission who also sat on the Personnel Review Committee, would readily overturn the decisions of court presidents. The 2019 amendments, which took effect on 17 July 2020, relocated the chamber to the Commission and introduced two instances. By a further amendment of 2020 the Commission was renamed the Disciplinary Court with effect from the same date.

At first instance the chamber sits as a panel of a judge of the Disciplinary Court, presiding, and two associate judges, at least one of whom must come from the same branch of the judiciary as the respondent. In disciplinary cases two "expert lay judges" (參審員), chosen from scholars and social representatives for a single three-year term, sit with the same powers as the professional judges. Appeals, which are limited to errors of law and must be lodged within twenty days, are heard by a panel presided over by the President of the Disciplinary Court together with two judges of the Supreme Court, one of the Supreme Administrative Court and one of the Disciplinary Court. Since a 2023 amendment, hearings of the chamber have been public by default.

==== Proceedings and sanctions ====
Except where the Evaluation Committee refers a case, disciplinary proceedings are initiated by impeachment by the Control Yuan, to which the Judicial Yuan may also refer a judge directly after hearing the judge and obtaining a resolution of the Judicial Personnel Review Committee.

The disciplinary sanctions available are, in descending order of severity: removal from judicial office with permanent disqualification from public service; dismissal with suspension of eligibility for appointment for one to five years; removal from judicial office with transfer to a non-judicial post; deprivation of pension and retirement allowance; reduction of pension and retirement allowance by 10 to 20 per cent; a fine of between one month's and one year's salary; and reprimand. Where the facts show that a judge is no longer fit to serve, one of the first three sanctions must be imposed.

The pension-related sanctions were added in 2019, when discipline was also extended to conduct committed in office by judges who have since retired or resigned; a judge whose removal or dismissal becomes final only after retirement forfeits all or part of the pension and retirement allowance, including sums already paid. The original Act already barred a judge referred for discipline by the Control Yuan from retiring or taking severance before judgment without the chamber's consent; since 2019 the bar has also applied to referrals by the Judicial Yuan and to cases sent to the Control Yuan for review.

=== Remuneration and retirement (Articles 71–80) ===
Judges are not classified by civil service rank or grade; their remuneration consists of a basic salary fixed by a statutory pay scale together with professional, duty and locality allowances. Tenured judges with at least fifteen years' service cease to hear cases at the age of seventy but may continue in research, mediation or judicial administration. On voluntary retirement, a tenured judge receives, in addition to the ordinary civil service pension, a retirement allowance (退養金) calculated by reference to age and length of judicial service. When this provision took effect in January 2015, it raised the allowance in practice for long-serving judges retiring before the age of 65 from 5 or 10 per cent of the pension to between 30 and 140 per cent, subject to a ceiling that keeps total retirement income at no more than 98 per cent of the salary of a serving judge of the same grade. Retirements rose from about twenty a year to 63 in 2015. The Legislative Yuan's Budget Center attributed the rise to the new allowance and warned of the loss of experienced judges; it calculated that a judge at the top of the pay scale could receive in retirement 1.76 times the income of a civil servant of the highest grade with the same service, and recommended that the scheme be reviewed together with the national pension reform.

=== Prosecutors (Articles 86–96) ===
Chapter 10 extends much of the Act to prosecutors, who are described as representatives of the public interest who must act "beyond political partisanship". It establishes a Prosecutorial Personnel Review Committee within the Ministry of Justice, councils of prosecutors in each prosecutors' office and a separate evaluation regime, and applies to prosecutors, with modifications, the Act's provisions on ineligibility, political neutrality, protection of tenure, discipline and remuneration.

== Implementation and impact ==
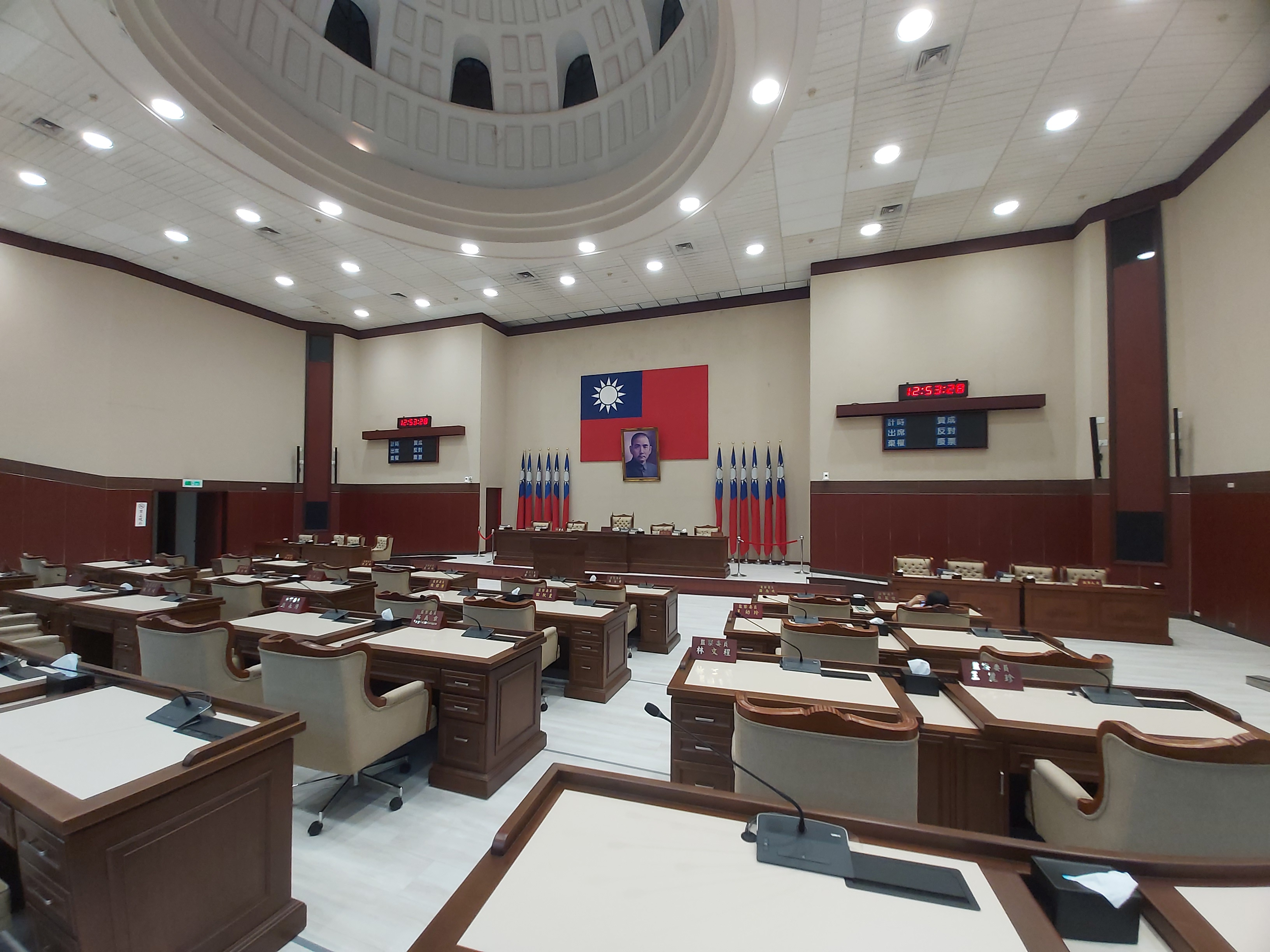
The council chamber of the Control Yuan

In its first years of operation the evaluation mechanism was criticised as having little effect. According to a study by the Control Yuan, the Judicial Evaluation Committee received 61 petitions between 6 January 2012 and 14 September 2018. It upheld 21, referring 12 to the Control Yuan and 9 to the Judicial Personnel Review Committee; it rejected 22, declined to admit 5 and disposed of 5 in other ways, while 8 were pending. The comprehensive appraisals of judges required by the original Article 31 were carried out twice, in 2014 and 2017. The Control Yuan concluded that petitions had mostly concerned personal misconduct, flaws of private character and improper demeanour or language in court, so that the public perceived the system as ineffective. It recommended that obvious abuses of evidentiary discretion and serious errors in applying the law which gravely harmed the parties be made grounds for evaluation.

The Judicial Reform Foundation, which filed 33 of the first 46 concluded petitions against judges, argued in 2017 that confining standing to specified bodies cut the committee off from litigants, and that the committee's findings could be reconsidered and reversed by the Control Yuan or the Judicial Personnel Review Committee, leaving the accountability mechanism fragmented and uncertain. Both criticisms were addressed in part by the 2019 amendments, which gave litigants direct standing and allowed the committee to refer cases straight to the disciplinary court.

The opening of direct petitions did not at first change the pattern of outcomes. According to the Judicial Reform Foundation, in the first year of the new system (July 2020 to July 2021) the Evaluation Committee reviewed 159 cases and upheld one, a referral by the Taoyuan District Court; none of the petitions brought directly by litigants was upheld. By the second anniversary the Foundation counted four petitions upheld by the judges' committee, all brought by courts, prosecutors' offices or organisations rather than by individuals. The Judicial Yuan responded that direct petitioning best balanced access with the efficient use of resources, that the evaluation process was not a means of challenging judgments, which must be pursued through appeal, retrial or extraordinary appeal, and that it would consider revising the rules on standing.

=== Shih Mu-chin case ===
The most senior judge disciplined under the Act has been Shih Mu-chin (石木欽), who had served as a division chief of the Supreme Court and President of the Taiwan High Court before becoming chairman of the Public Functionary Disciplinary Sanction Commission (公務員懲戒委員會) in 2017. The Control Yuan impeached him in August 2020 over his relationship between 1997 and 2017 with the businessman Weng Mao-chung (翁茂鍾), a party to litigation: Shih was accused of dining and playing golf with Weng, failing to recuse himself in cases in which Weng's lawyers appeared, giving him legal opinions, and having his wife and son buy shares in companies linked to Weng. At first instance the Disciplinary Chamber fined him one year's salary. On appeal, on 2 September 2022, the second-instance panel applied the principle of the "unity of misconduct" (違失行為一體性), treating some twenty years of conduct as a single course of conduct, and substituted dismissal with a one-year suspension of eligibility for appointment; the judgment is final. The Judicial Reform Foundation welcomed it as a model for the discipline of judges, while regarding the sanction as still too light.

The judgment has attracted doctrinal commentary. One note summarises its approach to breaches committed on both sides of the Act's entry into force: related breaches are treated as a whole, so that the period within which discipline may be imposed runs from the end of the last of them; the substantive law is in principle that in force at that time, with the Judges Act prevailing as lex specialis where it applies in parallel with the general Public Functionaries Discipline Act, subject to the rule that the more lenient law applies where the law has since changed. Another study examines the same judgment's use of the unity principle in relation to the limitation of disciplinary power, and a third analyses an earlier first-instance judgment on whether the Control Yuan, having impeached a judge, may refer further misconduct without a fresh impeachment, and on whether disciplinary power had been exhausted.

== Commentary ==
Tang Wen-chang, a former judge, attributed the failure of individual petitions chiefly to the exclusion of a judge's legal opinions as a ground of evaluation, since most litigants framed their complaints as disagreements about the law. He accepted that legal opinions lie at the core of judicial independence and should be contested by appeal, but argued that a judge's defective application of law to the facts should be capable of founding an evaluation. He also suggested that the enlargement of the committee's external membership might prove cosmetic, because those members are nominated by the Ministry of Justice and the bar and appointed by the President of the Judicial Yuan.

Writing in 2020, Wu Ching-chin, an associate professor of law, questioned whether the Evaluation Committee was genuinely external when seven of its eleven members were legal professionals, observing that the increase to six lay members would still leave them in a minority. He also doubted whether two lay members on a panel otherwise composed of judges would materially change the decisions of the Disciplinary Chamber, given that it decides by majority.

Academic commentary has placed the Act within the broader trajectory of judicial reform in Taiwan. Kai-Ping Su has argued that, in Taiwan's centralised and bureaucratic court system, judges bear public blame for the failings of the criminal justice system as a whole, and that the government's adoption of "responding to expectations of the people" as the ultimate goal of court reform risks conflicting with other values and producing counterproductive results. Hsu has shown how lawyers, judges and prosecutors, who had been allied in defending judicial autonomy against authoritarian control, divided after democratisation over questions of judicial policy, including the means by which the judiciary should be held accountable.

== See also ==
- Judicial Yuan
- Control Yuan
- Lay judges in Taiwan
