= Control Yuan =

Auditory branch of the Republic of China government

- 監察院; Chien-cha Yuan
- Emblem of the Control Yuan

Agency overview
- Formed: 16 February 1928; 98 years ago (pre-constitution); 4 June 1948; 78 years ago (1947 Constitution); 1 February 1993; 33 years ago (1992 Constitution amendment)
- Preceding agency: Auditing Yuan
- Dissolved: 1 October 1949 (mainland China)
- Superseding agency: People's Supervisory Commission (1949)
- Jurisdiction: Republic of China (Taiwan)
- Status: Parliamentary institution suspended since 1993
- Headquarters: Zhongzheng District, Taipei; 25.045278°N 121.52°E
- Agency executives: Vacant, President of the Control Yuan; Vacant, Vice President of the Control Yuan
- Key document: Additional Articles and the original Constitution of the Republic of China
- Website: www.cy.gov.tw

Control Yuan 監察院

Type
- Type: Upper house

History
- Founded: 4 June 1948; 78 years ago
- Disbanded: 1 February 1993; 33 years ago

Structure
- Seats: 178
- Length of term: 6 years
- Authority: Constitution of the Republic of China

Elections
- Voting system: Indirect election

Meeting place
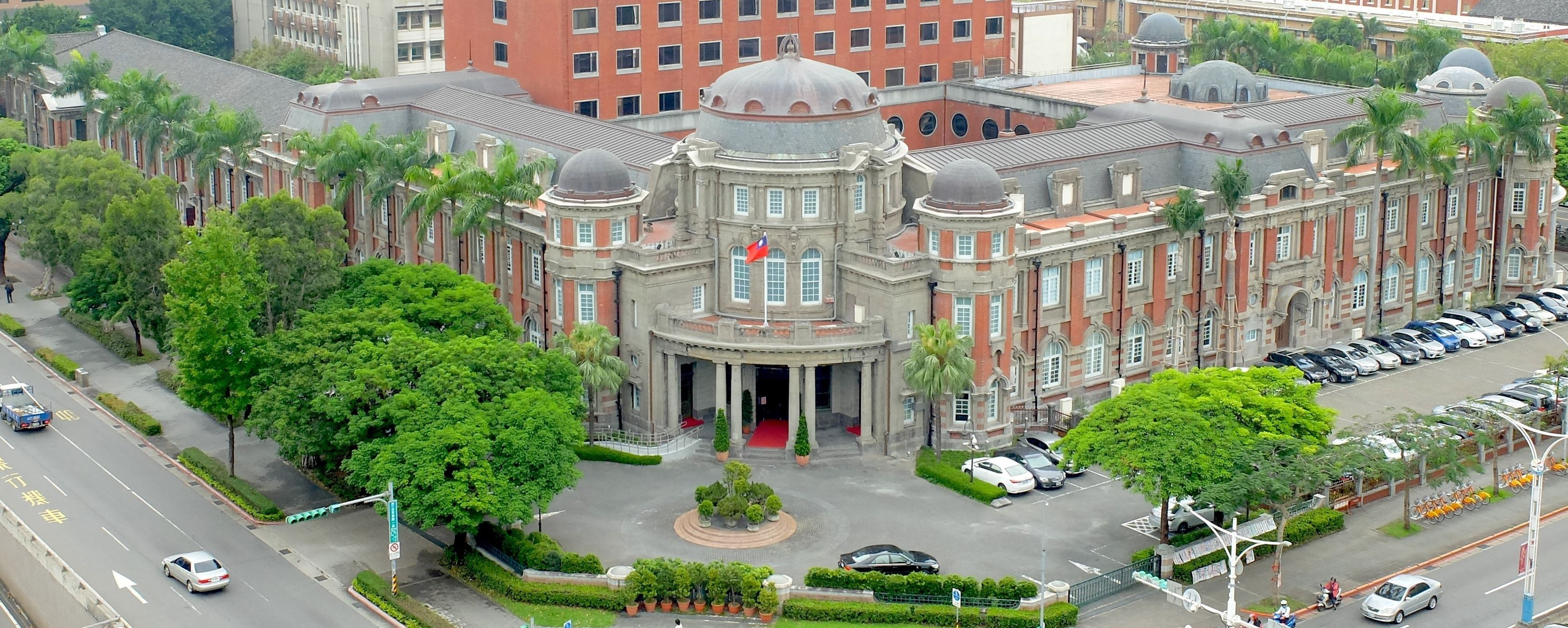
- Control Yuan Building, Taipei, Taiwan
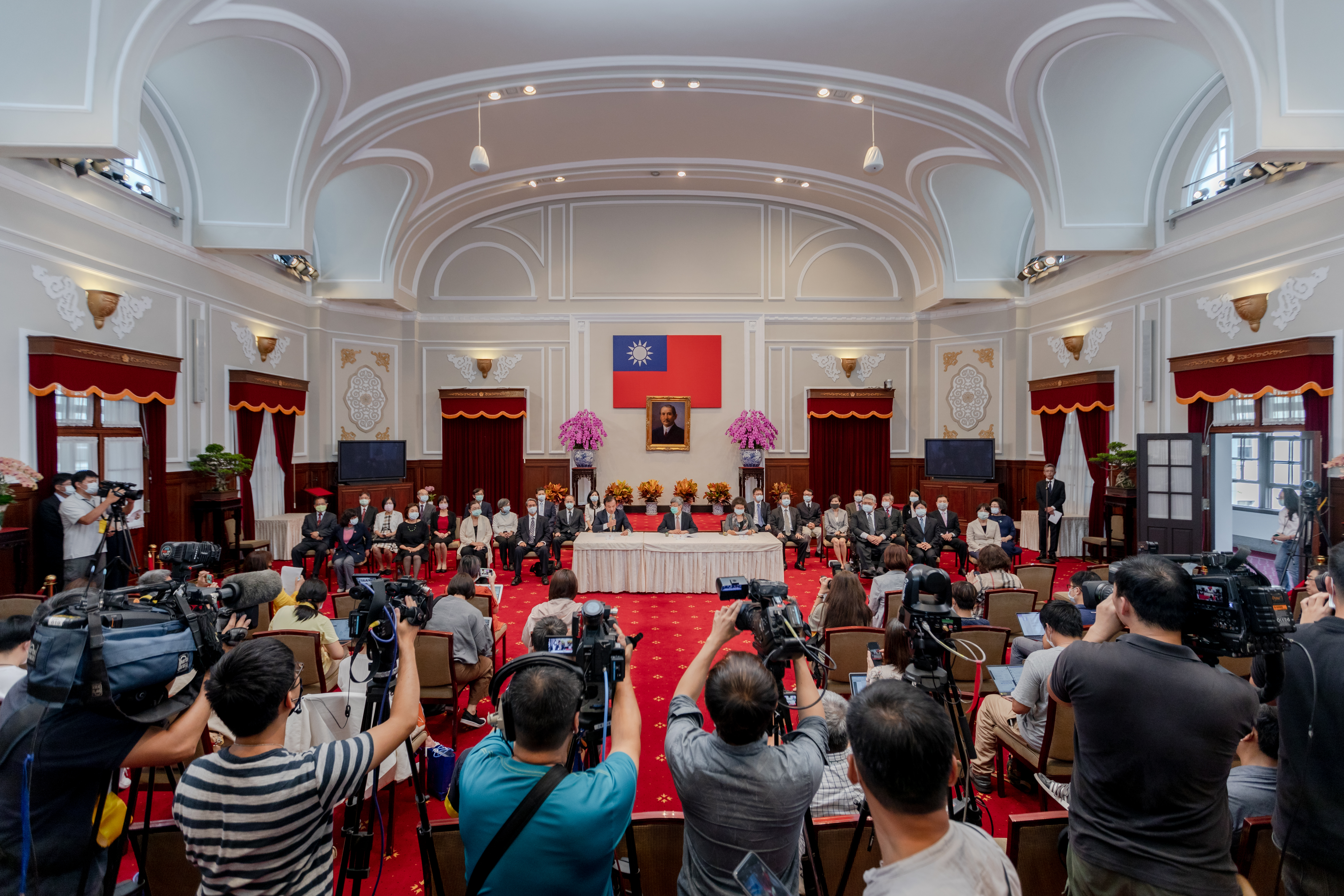

Constitution
- Constitution of the Republic of China

Control Yuan
- Traditional Chinese: 監察院
- Simplified Chinese: 监察院
Transcriptions
Standard Mandarin
- Hanyu Pinyin: Jiānchá Yuàn
- Bopomofo: ㄐㄧㄢ ㄔㄚˊ ㄩㄢˋ
- Wade–Giles: Chien^{1}-ch'a^{2} Yüan^{4}
- Tongyong Pinyin: Jianchá Yuàn
- MPS2: Jiānchá Yuàn
- IPA: [tɕjɛ́n.ʈʂʰǎ ɥɛ̂n]
other Mandarin
- Xiao'erjing: جْيَانْچَا يُوَن
Hakka
- Romanization: Kam-chhat Yen
Southern Min
- Hokkien POJ: Kàm-chhat Iⁿ
- Tâi-lô: Kàm-tshat Īnn

The Control Yuan is the supervisory and auditory branch of the government of the Republic of China, both during its time in mainland China and Taiwan.

Designed as a hybrid of auditor and ombudsman by Taiwanese law, the Control Yuan holds the following powers:

- Impeachment: The Control Yuan has the power to impeach government officials. Successfully impeached cases then go to the Disciplinary Court of the Judicial Yuan for adjudication. Impeachment of the President and the Vice President of the Republic follows a different procedure and does not go through the Control Yuan.
- Censure: The Control Yuan also has the power to censure a government official. The censure is sent to the official's superior officer.
- Audit: The Executive Yuan (cabinet) presents the annual budget to the Control Yuan each year for audit.
- Corrective Measures: The Control Yuan, after investigating the work and facilities of the Executive Yuan and its subordinate organs, may propose corrective measures to the Executive Yuan or its subordinate organs for improvement after these measures are examined and approved by the relevant committees.

According to the current Constitution, the Control Yuan shall consist of 29 members. One member shall be the President of the Control Yuan, and another shall be the Vice President. All members, including the President and Vice President of Control Yuan, shall be nominated by the President of the Republic and approved by Legislative Yuan (the parliament of Taiwan). Members serve with a term limit of six years.

Prior to constitutional reforms in the 1990s, the Control Yuan, along with National Assembly (electoral college) and the Legislative Yuan (lower house) formed the national tricameral parliament. It functioned similarly to an upper house of a bicameral legislature, though it formed its own separate branch and was indirectly elected by provincial or municipal legislatures with 178 senators elected.

== Structure ==
=== Members composition ===
The Control Yuan consists of a council with 29 members, including a President and a Vice President and the National Audit Office. All 29 members and the auditor-general are nominated by the President of the Republic and approved by Legislative Yuan for 6-year terms. The incumbent 6th Control Yuan was nominated by President Tsai Ing-wen on June 22, 2020 and later confirmed by Legislative Yuan on July 17, 2020. Members inaugurated on August 1, 2020, and their terms expire on July 31, 2026.

President	Vice President
Lee Hung-chun (Acting)	Post Vacant
Members
National Human Rights Commission members	Other members
9 members	17 members, 1 seat vacant

=== Council and committees ===
The council of the Yuan, chaired by the Yuan President, is divided into a number of committees to exercise the Yuan's supervision power. No member of the Control Yuan can hold another public office or profession while serving in the branch (according to Article 103 of the constitution), and members must be able to perform absent of partisan control or influence. Members can vote in no more than three committees and can join additional committees as non-voting members. Each committee can have up to 14 members and usually elects a convenor amongst themselves to chair committee meetings.

Standing committees	Special committees
Domestic and Ethnic Affairs; Foreign and Overseas Chinese Affairs; National Defense and Intelligence Affairs; Finance and Economic Affairs; Education and Cultural Affairs; Transportation and Procurement Affairs; Judicial and Prison Administration Affairs	Committee on Statutory Studies; Committee on Consultation; Committee on Discipline for Control Yuan Members; Committee on Anti-Corruption

The following responsibilities were also assigned by various acts.

- Anti-Corruption: The Anti-Corruption Committee is a seven-member committee, which cannot include the President or Vice President of the Control Yuan, which deals with asset declarations by government officials, recusals due to conflict of interest, and political donations.
- Examination Invigilation: The Control Yuan also appoints proctors to supervise examinations for civil servants.

=== National Human Rights Commission ===
The National Human Rights Committee is a ten-member committee under the Control Yuan which investigates human rights abuses, proposes human rights laws, compiles an annual report and promotes human rights education. The President of the Control Yuan must be a member of the committee. The committee was established by the National Human Rights Committee Organic Law on 10 December 2019.

=== Administrative Appeal Committee ===
An Administrative Appeal Committee, operated under the aegis of the Control Yuan but consisting of both members and non-members of the Control Yuan, considers administrative appeals which are inappropriate to both the Control Yuan proper and the Ministry of Audit.

=== National Audit Office ===
The National Audit Office is headed by an auditor-general who is nominated by the President of the Republic and appointed with consent of Legislative Yuan (parliament), exercises the Control Yuan's power of audit. It consists of five departments:

- General public affairs audit department
- National defense expenditures audit department
- Special public affairs audit department
- State-run corporations and government-owned businesses audit department
- Financial affairs audit department (also in charge of supervising local government audits)

In addition, most local governments have established the Audit Divisions/Offices, these serve as the subordinate agencies of the National Audit Office. Currently, 21 local governments of the 22 administrative divisions of Taiwan have Audit Divisions/Offices (except Lienchiang County).

== Impeachment procedure and notable cases ==
The Control Yuan is responsible to investigate possible violations on laws and regulations of public servants and raise impeachments if needed. Investigations are initiated by at least two members, and investigation committees must consist of at least nine members of the Control Yuan. The impeachment cases would be determined by a majority vote by members of investigation committee. Successful impeachment cases will then be forwarded to the Disciplinary Court (懲戒法院) under the Judicial Yuan for adjudication. However, the impeachment of the President or Vice President shall be initiated by Legislative Yuan (parliament) and adjudicate by the Constitutional Court under the Judicial Yuan. Judges are partly exempt from this route. Under the Judges Act, as amended with effect from 2020, the Judicial Evaluation Committee may refer a judge for discipline directly to the Disciplinary Chamber of the Judiciary within the Disciplinary Court, informing the Control Yuan of the referral, without first awaiting an impeachment. Details regarding impeachment proceedings are stipulated in the Enforcement Rules of the Control Act.

- In August 2020 the Control Yuan impeached Shih Mu-chin (石木欽), a former chairman of the Public Functionary Disciplinary Sanction Commission, over his twenty-year relationship with a businessman who was a party to litigation. On 2 September 2022 the second-instance panel of the Disciplinary Chamber of the Judiciary dismissed him from office under the Judges Act, replacing the fine imposed at first instance.
- On 19 February 2020, the Control Yuan impeached five military personnel which it deemed responsible for a F-16 Fighter aircraft crash on June 4, 2018, that killed all on board. The case was forwarded to the Public Functionary Disciplinary Sanction Commission in the Judicial Yuan to determine the punishment.
- On 4 June 2019, Hsieh Kung-ping (謝公秉), a top aide of former Hualien County commissioner Fu Kun-chi, Lin Chin-hu (林金虎), a county government employee, and media section chief Huang Wei-jun (黃微鈞), were impeached for bribery using $5.26 million in public funds. Both were found guilty on 18 February 2020; Hsieh was given two demerits and fined $100,000 NTD, Lin was handed a 10% pay reduction for a year, and Huang was given one demerit and fined $100,000 NTD.
- On 15 January 2019, Kuan Chung-ming, the president of National Taiwan University, was impeached for violating a law prohibiting public servants from working other jobs. The case was forwarded to the Public Functionary Disciplinary Sanction Commission in the Judicial Yuan to determine whether he was guilty and the appropriate punishment. Kuan was found guilty on 2 September 2019 and officially reprimanded.

== History ==
=== Constitutional theory ===
The concept of Control Yuan was introduced by Sun Yat-sen's Three Principles of the People. The theory proposed a separation of powers into five branches (五院; wǔyuàn; gō͘-īⁿ). Sun Yat-sen demonstrated the benefit of separating the supervision and auditing power from the legislature by the designation of the state organs of the Imperial China. He quotes the long tradition of supervision used in past dynasties, ranging from the Censor (御史) established by the Qin and Han dynasties to the tái (臺) and jiàn (諫) offices established under the Sui and Tang dynasties (tai were selected to supervise civil officials and military officers, while jian were selected to counsel the emperor on supervisory matters) to the Board of Public Censors (都察院) selected under the Ming and Qing dynasties. Most of these offices also operated local and provincial branches to supervise local governments. Under the Qing dynasty, the Board of Public Censors consisted of forty or fifty members, and two presidents, one of Manchu ancestry and the other of Han Chinese ancestry. They were, in theory, allowed to send one censor to participate in the meetings of all government boards. The Board's powers were minimized by the time of political flux which preceded the end of the Empire.

However, the 1947 Constitution of the Republic of China has many influences from the resolutions of the Political Consultative Assembly held between the Chinese Nationalist Party (Kuomintang; KMT) and the Chinese Communist Party. Carsun Chang, the major author of the Constitution draft in the Political Consultative Assembly, considered the fact that the supervision and auditing power is traditionally held by the legislature, and also the proposal of federalism from the Communist Party in the drafting process. He designed the Control Yuan to be a chamber of parliament that is indirectly elected by the provincial legislatures of China. The Control Yuan has some similarities to the United States Senate, which allocated a similar number of seats to each province of China and holds the power to confirm many important public positions in the Judicial Yuan and Examination Yuan appointed by the President of the Republic.

In the 1947 constitution, the Control Yuan, together with National Assembly and Legislative Yuan, thus formed chambers of a tricameral parliament according to the Judicial Yuan's interpretation number 76 of the Constitution in 1957. The Control Yuan was given the power to request documents from other government agencies and investigate them for violations of law or neglect as under Sun Yat-sen's ideology. The auditor-general was considered elected by the Control Yuan, who shall be nominated by the President of the Republic with consent of the Legislative Yuan, who was responsible for submitting reports on government budgets. Finally, the Control Yuan had confirmation power for the President, Vice President and members of the Judicial Yuan and Examination Yuan.

=== Establishment and relocation to Taiwan ===
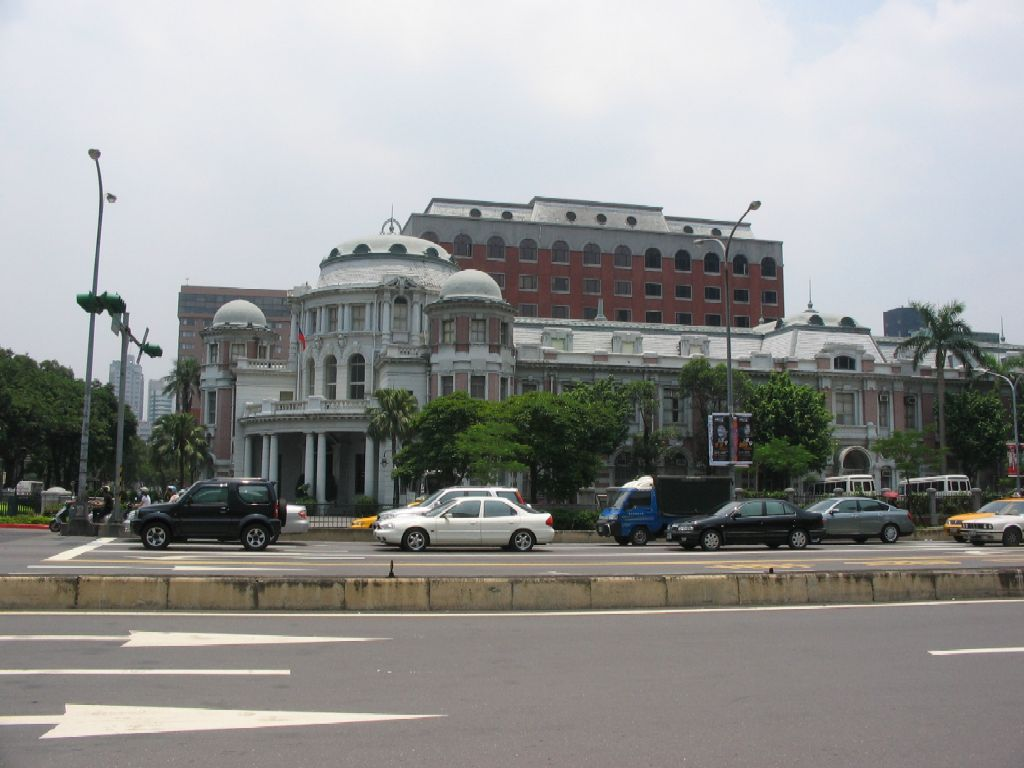
The Control Yuan building, built in 1915 when Taiwan was under Japanese rule as the governmental building of Taihoku Prefecture.

In the early republican era, the Beiyang government was in favor of the traditional three-branch form of separation of powers. However, a weak culture of republicanism and, later, the Warlord Era suppressed the implementation of this constitutional ideology.

After a successful Northern Expedition campaign, the Kuomintang secured its leadership in China and started to build the Nationalist government according to Sun Yat-sen's ideology. Five branches (Yuans) were created under the Kuomintang's party-state administration. During this time, the Auditing Yuan (審計院; Shěnjì Yuàn) was established in February 1928, but in February 1931, the Control Yuan was established and the Auditing Yuan was downgraded to the current ministry-level National Audit Office within the Control Yuan. The creation of Control Yuan on 16 February 1931 was the last establishment of the five-Yuans.

However, the 1947 Constitution of the Republic of China, although retaining the architecture of the five-branch government, changed the Control Yuan to be a parliament chamber. Under the constitution, members of the Yuan (by now senators de facto) were elected from regional legislatures: 5 senators elected from each province, 2 from each of the direct-administered municipalities, 8 from Mongolia (by 1948 only the Inner Mongolian provinces were represented), 8 from Tibet, and 8 from the overseas Chinese communities. As originally envisioned both the President and Vice President of the Control Yuan were to be elected by and from the members like the speaker of many other parliamentary bodies worldwide (and similar to the President Pro-Tempore of the United States Senate). Following the promulgation of the Constitution, the 178 first Control Yuan senators elected by the regional legislatures convened in Nanking on June 4, 1948, for the opening of their chamber. The first Control Yuan then confirmed the leaders and members of the first Judicial Yuan and Examination Yuan. The transition from one-party state Nationalist government to constitutional government was hence completed.

However, a year later, the Kuomintang-led government of the Republic of China lost the Chinese Civil War and retreated to Taiwan in December 1949. Taiwan had been under Japanese rule before August 15, 1945; as a result of World War II, the Republic of China Armed Forces occupied Taiwan on behalf of the Allies. The government established Taiwan Province to mark its annexation of Taiwan. There were 104 members who retreated to Taiwan with the government, including 5 senators from Taiwan. The Control Yuan occupied the former governmental building of Taihoku Prefecture in the Japanese era. The term of the retreated senators was extended indefinitely until "re-election is possible in their original electoral district." During this era, the first Control Yuan members continued to conduct sessions in Taipei until they were ordered to retire by the Judicial Yuan (Constitutional Court) in 1991.

With the reduction of members due to age, elections were held from 1969 to 1986 to elect new senators to the Yuan from Taiwan, and the cities of Taipei and Kaoshung were soon represented.

Until 1993, the Control Yuan's legislative work was limited to helping to audit the national budget, which would then be presented to the Legislative Yuan. The other actions the then chamber took were its impeachment, confirmation and censure powers, applied whenever necessary.

=== Democratization ===
Democratization took place in Taiwan starting late 1980s; the movement resulted in a series of constitutional amendment known as the Additional Articles of the Constitution. On May 27, 1992, the second amendment removed the Control Yuan from parliament chambers and its members removed from their legislative duties. Decision process of leaders and members of the Control Yuan follows a similar pattern of Judicial Yuan and Examination Yuan. These officials were nominated by the President of the Republic and confirmation by the National Assembly. The National Assembly was another parliament chamber that can hold the confirmation process to maintain the separation of powers.

On 18 July 1997, by the 4th constitutional amendment, the procedure to impeach the President and Vice President of the Republic was transferred out from the Control Yuan. In this amendment, presidential impeachment shall be initiated by Legislative Yuan and voted by the National Assembly. However, the later political developments in Taiwan has inclined to simplify the parliament to one chamber. The Legislative Yuan was the surviving chamber and the National Assembly was then abolished. Since 25 April 2000, confirmation of leaders and members of the Control Yuan are transferred to Legislative Yuan, together with the confirmation of similar officials of Judicial Yuan and Examination Yuan.

At the end of 2004, President Chen Shui-bian sent a list of nominees to positions in the Control Yuan to the Legislative Yuan for approval. The coalition of Kuomintang and People First Party, which then held a majority in the Legislative Yuan, refused to ratify President Chen's nominees and demanded that he submit a new list. The political deadlock that resulted stopped the Control Yuan from functioning from February 2005 to July 2008. The situation resolved after Kuomintang's candidate Ma Ying-jeou was elected as the President in 2008 Taiwanese presidential election and Kuomintang won the supermajority of Legislative Yuan seats in 2008 Taiwanese legislative election. Mr. Wang Chien-shien was then appointed to be its president under the Ma Ying-jeou administration.

In 2016, Democratic Progressive Party's candidate Tsai Ing-wen was elected as the President in 2016 Taiwanese presidential election and Democratic Progressive Party won the majority of Legislative Yuan seats in 2016 Taiwanese legislative election. On 10 December 2019, the Legislative Yuan passed the National Human Rights Committee Organic Law (國家人權委員會組織法), which established the National Human Rights Committee under the Control Yuan. Its duties include investigating human rights abuses, proposing human rights laws, compiling an annual report, and educational promotion of human rights, in accordance with the Paris Principles. The committee will consist of 10 members, one of which is the President of the Control Yuan who heads the committee. It launched on August 1, 2020, with former democracy activist Chen Chu as president. Kuomintang member Justin Huang was discussed as a potential vice-president, but he declined the position after receiving criticism from both the KMT for crossing party lines without consultation and the DPP for his role in the construction of the Taitung Miramar Resort while he was county magistrate, for which the county government was censured by the Control Yuan.

In June 2025, an amendment to the Additional Articles of the Constitution of the Republic of China sponsored by Huang Kuo-chang (TPP) and Lo Chih-chiang (KMT) was formally submitted to abolish the Control Yuan.

== Elections and terms ==
Jurisdiction of Control Yuan branch offices (Suspended since 1949)

The Kuomintang-led government of the Republic of China retreated to Taiwan in 1949, the year following the elections after the enactment of the 1947 constitution. As the Kuomintang government continues to claim sovereignty over mainland China, the term limit of the original Members of the Control Yuan was extended until "re-election is possible in their original electoral districts." In response to the increasing democracy movement in Taiwan, limited supplementary elections were held in the Free Area (Taiwan) starting 1969. Members elected in these supplementary elections served together with those who were elected in 1948. This situation remained until a Constitutional Court (Judicial Yuan) ruling on June 21, 1991, that ordered the retirement of all members with extended terms by the end of 1991.

Term	Length	Actual length	Election/Appointment	Seats	Notes
1st	Initially 6 years, then limit removed by Temporary Provisions	Jun 4, 1948－Jan 31, 1993 (See Note column for detailed terms)	1947－48 elections	178	The only election held in mainland China. 5 seats were elected in Taiwan. 104 members retreated to Taiwan with the government; served until the end of 1991.
1st	Initially 6 years, then limit removed by Temporary Provisions	Jun 4, 1948－Jan 31, 1993 (See Note column for detailed terms)	1969 supp	2	Elected in Taipei, terms equal to the 1948-elected members
1st	Initially 6 years, then limit removed by Temporary Provisions	Jun 4, 1948－Jan 31, 1993 (See Note column for detailed terms)	1973 1st supp	15	Elected in Taiwan with 6-year terms; then extended to 8 years
1st	Initially 6 years, then limit removed by Temporary Provisions	Jun 4, 1948－Jan 31, 1993 (See Note column for detailed terms)	1980 2nd supp	32	Elected in Taiwan with 6-year terms
1st	Initially 6 years, then limit removed by Temporary Provisions	Jun 4, 1948－Jan 31, 1993 (See Note column for detailed terms)	1987 3rd supp	32	Elected in Taiwan with 6-year terms; served until Jan 31, 1993
2nd	6 years	Feb 1, 1993－Jan 31, 1999	Presidential nomination with National Assembly confirmation	29	Changed to a non-parliamentary institution; elections stopped
3rd	6 years	Feb 1, 1999－Jan 31, 2005	Presidential nomination with National Assembly confirmation	29	
4th	6 years	Aug 1, 2008－Jul 31, 2014	Presidential nomination with Legislative Yuan confirmation	29	Vacancy due to Legislative Yuan's refusal to initiate the confirmation process
5th	6 years	Aug 1, 2014－Jul 31, 2020	Presidential nomination with Legislative Yuan confirmation	29	
6th	6 years	Aug 1, 2020－Jul 31, 2026	Presidential nomination with Legislative Yuan confirmation	29	Incumbent

Timeline of Control Yuan elections and terms

== President and Vice President of the Control Yuan ==
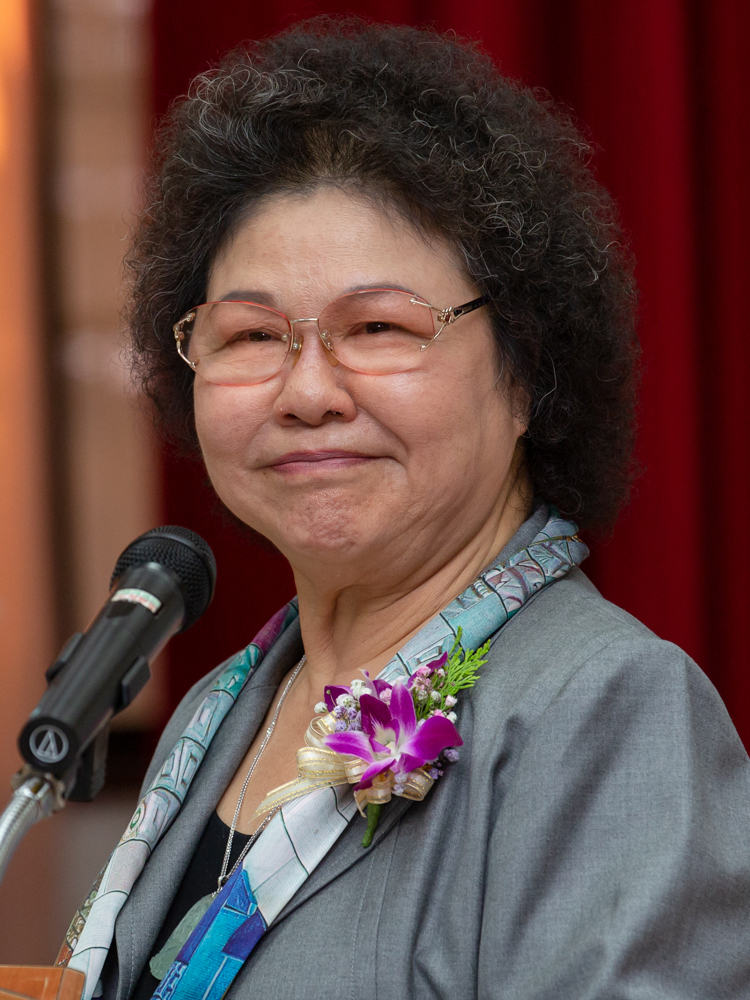
Chen Chu, the incumbent President of the Control Yuan

=== Before the 1947 Constitution ===
The President and Vice President of the Control Yuan in the Nationalist government era were appointed by the Kuomintang (Nationalist Party).

President	Vice President
Tsai Yuan-pei (蔡元培) (8 October 1928 – 28 August 1929) not inaugurated; Zhao Dai-wen (趙戴文) (29 August 1929 – 17 November 1930) not inaugurated; Yu Yu-jen (于右任) (18 November 1930 – 9 June 1948)	Chen Guo-fu (陳果夫) (8 October 1928 – 27 December 1931); Ding Wei-fen (丁惟汾) (28 December 1931 – 6 December 1935); Hsu Chung-chih (許崇智) (7 December 1935 – 26 December 1941); Liu Shang-qing (劉尚清) (27 December 1941 – 19 February 1947); Huang Shao-hong (黃紹竑) (7 June 1947 – 26 October 1947); Liu Zhe (劉哲) (27 October 1947 – 4 June 1948)

=== 1947 Constitution ===
The Control Yuan was a chamber of parliament under the 1947 Constitution of the Republic of China. The President and Vice President of the Control Yuan were elected by and from the members like the speaker of many other parliamentary bodies.

Order	Date	President		Vice President		Note
1	Jun 9, 1948–Jan 6, 1954	Yu Yu-jen	于右任	Liu Che	劉哲	Inaugurated in Nanking and moved to Taipei
1	Jan 7, 1954–Aug 17, 1954	Yu Yu-jen	于右任	Post vacant		Vice President Liu Che died in office
1	Aug 18, 1954–Jul 11, 1957	Yu Yu-jen	于右任	Liang Shang-tung	梁上棟	
1	Jul 12, 1957–Apr 11, 1958	Yu Yu-jen	于右任	Post vacant		Vice President Liang Shang-tung died in office
1	Apr 12, 1958–Nov 9, 1964	Yu Yu-jen	于右任	Li Shih-tsung	李嗣璁	
1	Nov 10, 1964–Aug 16, 1965	Vice President as Acting President		Li Shih-tsung	李嗣璁	President Yu Yu-jen died in office
2	Aug 17, 1965–May 14, 1972	Li Shih-tsung	李嗣璁	Chang Wei-han	張維翰	
2	May 15, 1972–Mar 18, 1973	Vice President as Acting President		Chang Wei-han	張維翰	President Li Shih-tsung died in office
3	Mar 19, 1973–Mar 23, 1981	Yu Chun-hsien	余俊賢	Chou Pai-lien	周百鍊	
3	Mar 24, 1981–Mar 11, 1987	Yu Chun-hsien	余俊賢	Huang Tzuen-chiou	黃尊秋	
4	Mar 12, 1987–Dec 29, 1991	Huang Tzuen-chiou	黃尊秋	Ma Kung-chun	馬空群	
4	Dec 30, 1991–Feb 19, 1992	Huang Tzuen-chiou	黃尊秋	Post vacant		Vice President Ma Kung-chun retired at end of 1991
4	Feb 20, 1992–Jan 31, 1993	Huang Tzuen-chiou	黃尊秋	Lin Rong-san	林榮三	

=== 1992 Constitution amendment ===
Since the 1992 ratification of the constitutional amendment, the Control Yuan was reorganized from a chamber of parliament to an independent agency that still performs most of its designated constitutional powers. Since the 4th term, the President and Vice President of the Control Yuan, together with other members, were nominated by the President of the Republic and approved by the Legislative Yuan (the now-unicameral parliament of Taiwan).

Term	Date	President		Vice President		Note
2nd	Feb 1, 1993–Sep 22, 1995	Chen Li-an	陳履安	Cheng Shuei-chih	鄭水枝	
2nd	Sep 23, 1995–Aug 31, 1996	Vice President as Acting President		Cheng Shuei-chih	鄭水枝	President Chen Li-an resigned to run for 1996 Taiwanese presidential election
2nd	Sep 1, 1996–Jan 31, 1999	Wang Tso-yung	王作榮	Cheng Shuei-chih	鄭水枝	
3rd	Feb 1, 1999–Jan 31, 2005	Fredrick Chien	錢復	Cheng Meng-lin	陳孟鈴	
—N/a	Feb 1, 2005–Jul 31, 2008	Post vacant		Post vacant		Vacant due to Executive-Legislative conflict
4th	Aug 1, 2008–Jul 31, 2014	Wang Chien-shien	王建煊	Chen Jinn-lih	陳進利	
5th	Aug 1, 2014–Jul 31, 2020	Chang Po-ya	張博雅	Sun Ta-chuan	孫大川	
6th	Aug 1, 2020–present	Chen Chu	陳菊	Lee Hung-chun	李鴻鈞	Vice presidency vacant from Aug 1, 2020 to May 30, 2022

== Comparable agencies in other countries ==
Country	Agency
Brazil	Federal Court of Accounts
China	National Supervisory Commission (国家监察委员会)
European Union	European Court of Auditors
Israel	State Comptroller (מבקר המדינה, مراقب الدولة)
Japan	Board of Audit (会計検査院)
Philippines	Office of the Ombudsman and Commission on Audit
South Korea (ROK)	Board of Audit and Inspection (Korean: 감사원; Hanja: 監査院)
United Kingdom	National Audit Office
United States	Government Accountability Office

== See also ==
- Comptroller
- Government of the Republic of China
- Government performance auditing
- Ombudsman
- Politics of the Republic of China
