= Chen Li-an =

Taiwanese mathematician, economist, and politician (born 1937)

- 陳履安
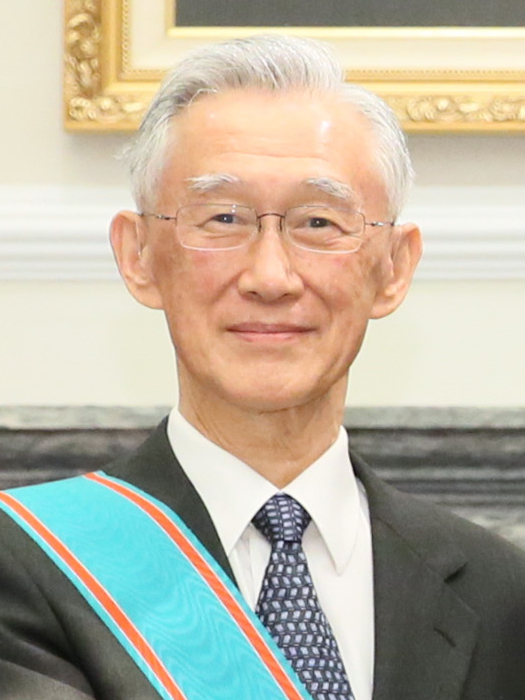
- Chen in 2016

5th President of the Control Yuan
- In office 1 February 1993 – 23 September 1995
- Appointed by: Lee Teng-hui
- Vice President: Cheng Shuei-chih
- Preceded by: Huang Tzuen-chiou
- Succeeded by: Cheng Shuei-chih (acting); Wang Tso-jung

18th Minister of National Defense
- In office 1 June 1991 – 26 February 1993
- Prime Minister: Hau Pei-tsun
- Commander-in-Chief: Lee Teng-hui
- Preceded by: Hau Pei-tsun
- Succeeded by: Sun Chen

Minister without Portfolio
- In office 20 July 1988 – 1 February 1993
- Prime Minister: Yu Kuo-hwa; Lee Huan; Hau Pei-tsun

18th Minister of Economic Affairs
- In office 22 July 1988 – 1 June 1990
- Prime Minister: Yu Kuo-hwa; Lee Huan
- Preceded by: Lee Ta-hai
- Succeeded by: Vincent Siew

4th Minister of Science and Technology Council
- In office 30 May 1984 – 20 July 1988
- Prime Minister: Chiu Chuang-huan; Yu Kuo-hwa
- Preceded by: Chang Ming-che
- Succeeded by: Hsia Han-ming

Political Deputy Minister of Education
- In office 8 June 1978 – 17 July 1979
- Minister: Huisen Zhu

Permanent Deputy Minister of Education
- In office 6 December 1977 – 8 June 1978
- Minister: Lee Yuan-tsu; Huisen Zhu

Personal details
- Born: 22 June 1937 (age 88) Qingtian, Zhejiang, China
- Party: Kuomintang
- Spouse: Tsao Chin
- Children: Chen Yu-hui
- Parents: Chen Cheng (father); Tan Xiang (mother)
- Education: Massachusetts Institute of Technology (BS); New York University (MS, PhD)

Chen Li-an (Chinese: 陳履安; pinyin: Chén Lǚ'ān; born 22 June 1937), sometimes spelled Chen Lu-an, is a Taiwanese mathematician, economist, and former politician. He was the president of the Control Yuan from 1993 to 1995.

== Early life and education ==
Chen was born in China in Lushan City, Jiangxi, on 22 June 1937. His ancestral home is in Qingtian County, Zhejiang. His father, Chen Cheng, was a prominent politician who was a general in the National Revolutionary Army under Chiang Kai-shek. After studying at the Affiliated Senior High School of National Taiwan Normal University, Chen was educated in the United States.

Chen graduated from the Massachusetts Institute of Technology (MIT) with a Bachelor of Science (B.S.) in electrical engineering in 1960, then completed graduate studies at New York University, where he earned his Master of Science (M.S.) in mathematics and his Ph.D. in mathematics from the Courant Institute of Mathematical Sciences in 1968 under Hungarian-American mathematician Peter Lax. His doctoral dissertation was titled, "Solving Improperly Posed Problems by Mathematical Programming Technique".

== Career ==
While he still considered the Kuomintang a "rotten party", Chen endorsed the KMT candidate Lien Chan in the 2000 ROC presidential election, believing that Lien was unlike the rest of the Kuomintang.

In January 2001, Chen re-joined the Kuomintang, because he thought both the party and Taiwan needed him.

1996 Republic of China Presidential Election Result
President Candidate	Vice President Candidate	Party	Votes	%
Lee Teng-hui	Lien Chan	Kuomintang	5,813,699	54.0
Peng Ming-min	Frank Hsieh	Democratic Progressive Party	2,274,586	21.1
Lin Yang-kang	Hau Pei-tsun	Independent	1,603,790	14.9
Chen Li-an	Wang Ching-feng	Independent	1,074,044	9.9
Invalid/blank votes			117,160	
Total			10,883,279	100

== See also ==
- Politics of the Republic of China

Government offices
Preceded by Lee Ta-hai	ROC Minister of Economic Affairs; 1988–1991	Succeeded by Vincent Siew
Preceded by Hau Pei-tsun	ROC Minister of National Defense; 1991–1993	Succeeded by Sun Chen
Preceded by Huang Tzuen-chiou	President of Control Yuan; 1993–1995	Succeeded by Cheng Sui-Je (acting); Wang Tso-jung
