= Daguan County =

Daguan County 大关县
- County
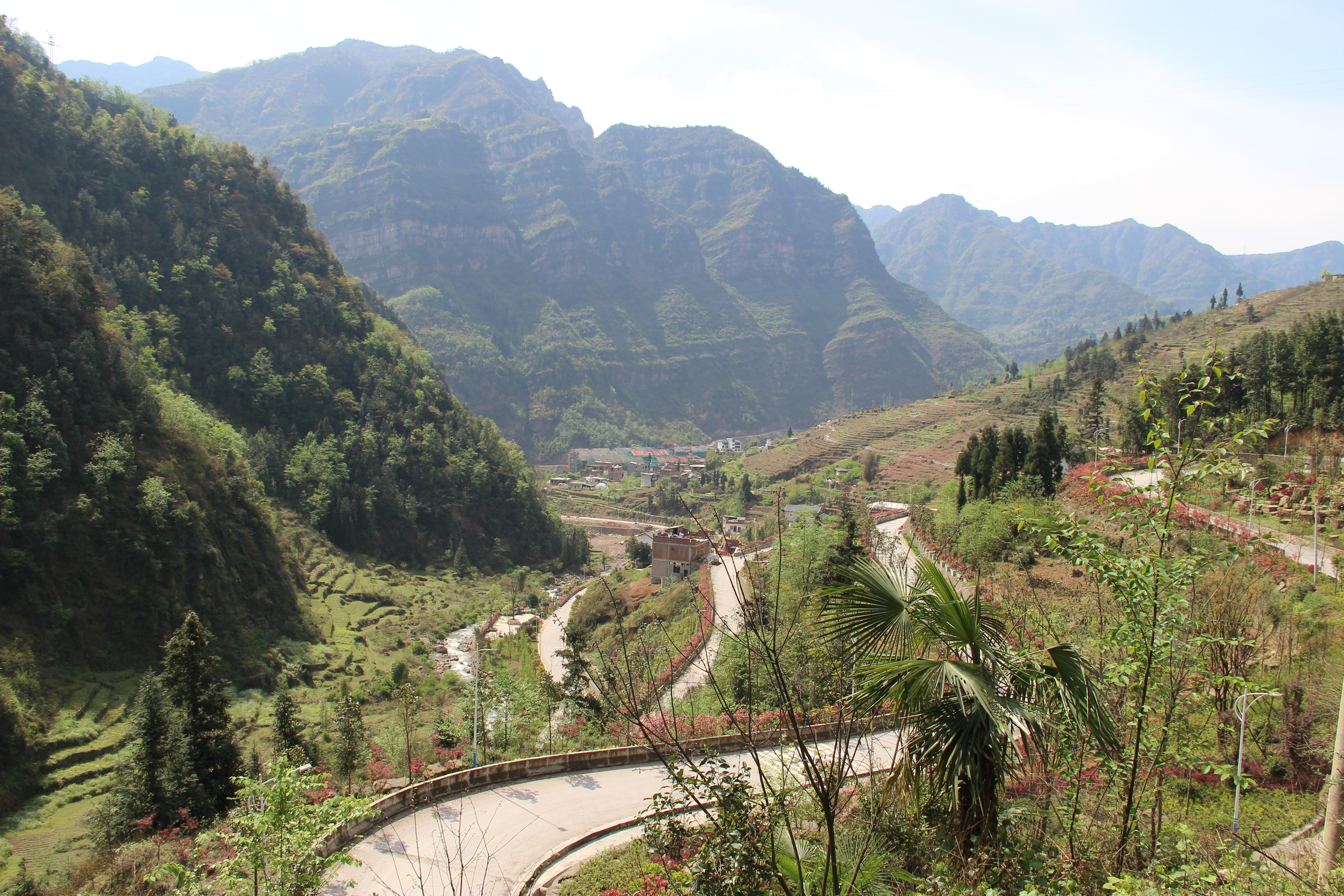

- Location of Daguan County (red) and Zhaotong Prefecture (pink) within Yunnan province of China

- Location of the seat in Yunnan
- Coordinates: 27.748°N 103.891°E
- Country: People's Republic of China
- Province: Yunnan
- Prefecture-level city: Zhaotong

Area
  - Total: 1,802 km^{2} (696 sq mi)

Population
  - Total: 260,000
  - Density: 140/km^{2} (370/sq mi)
- Time zone: UTC+8 (CST)
- Postal code: 657400
- Area code: 0870
- Website: www.yndg.gov.cn

Daguan County (simplified Chinese: 大关县; traditional Chinese: 大關縣; pinyin: Dàguān Xiàn) is located in Zhaotong Prefecture in northeastern Yunnan Province, China.

== Administrative divisions ==
Daguan County has 8 towns and 1 ethnic township.

8 towns

- Cuihua (翠华镇)
- Yuwan (玉碗镇)
- Jili (吉利镇)
- Tianxing (天星镇)
- Mugan (木杆镇)
- Yuele (悦乐镇)
- Shoushan (寿山镇)
- Gaoqiao (高桥镇)

1 ethnic township

- Shanggaoqiao Hui, Yi and Miao (上高桥回族彝族苗族乡)

== Transport ==
- China National Highway 213

== Climate ==
Climate data for Daguan, elevation 1,176 m (3,858 ft), (1991–2020 normals, extremes 1981–2010)
Month	Jan	Feb	Mar	Apr	May	Jun	Jul	Aug	Sep	Oct	Nov	Dec	Year
Record high °C (°F)	20.7 (69.3)	31.9 (89.4)	36.0 (96.8)	35.4 (95.7)	36.1 (97.0)	37.2 (99.0)	37.9 (100.2)	38.1 (100.6)	39.3 (102.7)	33.2 (91.8)	29.0 (84.2)	21.5 (70.7)	39.3 (102.7)
Mean daily maximum °C (°F)	7.7 (45.9)	11.0 (51.8)	16.2 (61.2)	21.8 (71.2)	24.6 (76.3)	26.0 (78.8)	28.9 (84.0)	28.7 (83.7)	24.4 (75.9)	18.5 (65.3)	14.8 (58.6)	9.2 (48.6)	19.3 (66.8)
Daily mean °C (°F)	4.5 (40.1)	6.9 (44.4)	11.0 (51.8)	15.9 (60.6)	19.1 (66.4)	21.1 (70.0)	23.3 (73.9)	22.9 (73.2)	19.6 (67.3)	14.9 (58.8)	11.0 (51.8)	6.0 (42.8)	14.7 (58.4)
Mean daily minimum °C (°F)	2.6 (36.7)	4.4 (39.9)	7.9 (46.2)	12.3 (54.1)	15.5 (59.9)	18.1 (64.6)	19.8 (67.6)	19.5 (67.1)	16.9 (62.4)	12.9 (55.2)	8.8 (47.8)	4.1 (39.4)	11.9 (53.4)
Record low °C (°F)	−4.1 (24.6)	−4.1 (24.6)	0.1 (32.2)	3.3 (37.9)	7.1 (44.8)	12.8 (55.0)	14.2 (57.6)	13.1 (55.6)	9.5 (49.1)	5.9 (42.6)	0.3 (32.5)	−4.4 (24.1)	−4.4 (24.1)
Average precipitation mm (inches)	11.2 (0.44)	12.3 (0.48)	27.0 (1.06)	50.3 (1.98)	86.5 (3.41)	162.0 (6.38)	221.8 (8.73)	201.5 (7.93)	129.5 (5.10)	65.0 (2.56)	19.8 (0.78)	9.8 (0.39)	996.7 (39.24)
Average precipitation days (≥ 0.1 mm)	13.1	13.0	15.2	15.6	16.8	20.5	19.2	18.7	18.2	20.8	14.5	14.8	200.4
Average snowy days	4.2	2.4	0.3	0	0	0	0	0	0	0	0.2	1.8	8.9
Average relative humidity (%)	82	79	76	73	74	81	81	81	84	87	83	83	80
Mean monthly sunshine hours	49.9	62.1	94.3	119.6	116.5	93.9	150.2	155.6	94.0	56.0	70.1	52.8	1,115
Percentage possible sunshine	15	19	25	31	28	23	36	39	26	16	22	16	25
Source: China Meteorological Administration
