= Wuxia =

Genre of Chinese fiction

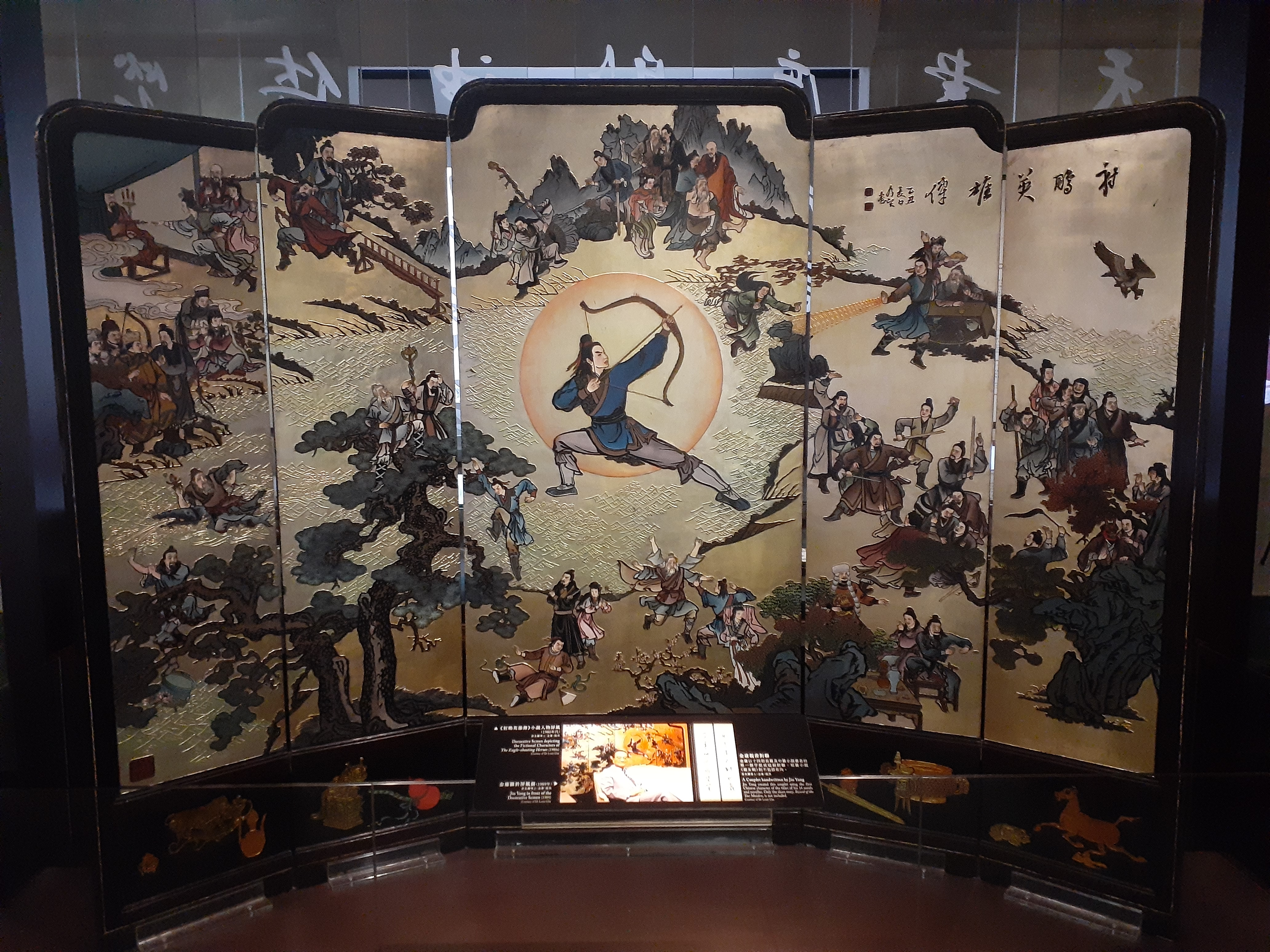
- Folding screen tribute for the Legend of Condor Heroes at Jin Yong Gallery
- Traditional Chinese: 武俠
- Simplified Chinese: 武侠
Transcriptions
Standard Mandarin
- Hanyu Pinyin: wǔxiá
- Bopomofo: ㄨˇ ㄒㄧㄚˊ
- Wade–Giles: wu^{3}-hsia^{2}
- IPA: [ù.ɕjǎ]
other Mandarin
- Xiao'erjing: وشيا
- Dungan: уся
Yue: Cantonese
- Yale Romanization: móuh-hahp
- Jyutping: mou^{5}-hap^{6}
- IPA: [mɔw˩˧.hɐp̚˨]
Southern Min
- Hokkien POJ: bú-kiap
- Tâi-lô: bú-kiap

Wuxia (武俠 [ù.ɕjǎ], lit. 'martial arts and chivalry') is a genre of Chinese fiction and low fantasy concerning the adventures of martial artists in ancient China. Although wuxia is traditionally a form of historical fantasy literature, its popularity has caused it to be adapted for such diverse art forms as Chinese opera, manhua, television dramas, films, donghua, and video games. It forms part of popular culture in many Chinese-speaking communities around the world. Although they are commonly described as a subgenre of martial arts movies, according to Hong Kong film director, producer, and movie writer Ronny Yu, wuxia movies are not to be confused with the genre in a strict sense.

The word "wǔxiá" is a compound composed of the two elements wǔ (武, literally "martial", "military", or "armed") and xiá (俠, literally "chivalrous", "vigilante" or "hero"). There is a third element in wuxia, for a vigilante martial artist who follows the code of xia is often referred to as a xiake (俠客, literally "follower of xia") or youxia (遊俠, literally "wandering xia"). In some translations, the martial artist is referred to as a jiànxiá (劍俠) or jiànkè (劍客), either of which can be interpreted as a "swordsman" or "swordswoman", even though they may not necessarily wield a sword.

Heroes in wuxia fiction typically do not serve a lord, hold military rank, or belong to the aristocracy. They often originate from the lower social classes of ancient Chinese society. A code of chivalry usually requires wuxia heroes to right and redress wrongs, fight for righteousness, remove oppressors, and bring retribution for past misdeeds.

== History ==
=== Earlier precedents ===
Even though the term "wuxia" as the name of a genre is a recent coinage, stories about xia date back more than 2,000 years. Wuxia stories have their roots in some early xia tales from 300–200 BC. The Legalist philosopher Han Fei spoke disparagingly of youxias in his book Han Feizi in the chapter On Five 'Maggot' Classes about five social classes in the Spring and Autumn period. Some well-known stories include Zhuan Zhu's assassination of King Liao of Wu, and most notably, Jing Ke's attempt on the life of the King of Qin (who later became Qin Shi Huang). In Volume 86 of the Records of the Grand Historian (Shi Ji), Sima Qian mentioned five notable assassins – Cao Mo, Zhuan Zhu, Yu Rang, Nie Zheng and Jing Ke – in the Warring States period who undertook tasks of conducting political assassinations of aristocrats and nobles. These assassins were known as cike (刺客; literally "stabbing guests"). They usually rendered their loyalties and services to feudal lords and nobles in return for rewards such as riches and women. In Volume 124 of the Shi Ji, Sima Qian detailed several embryonic features of xia culture from this period. These popular phenomena were also documented in other historical records such as the Book of Han and the Book of the Later Han.

Xiake stories made a turning point in the Tang dynasty (618–907) and returned in the form of chuanqi (傳奇; 'legendary tales'). Stories from that era, such as Nie Yinniang, The Kunlun Slave, Thirteenth Madame Jing (荊十三娘), Red String (紅線) and The Bearded Warrior (虬髯客), served as prototypes for modern wuxia stories. They featured fantasies and isolated protagonists – usually loners – who performed daring heroic deeds. During the Song dynasty (960–1279), similar stories circulated in the huaben, short works that were once thought to have served as prompt-books for shuochang (traditional Chinese storytelling).

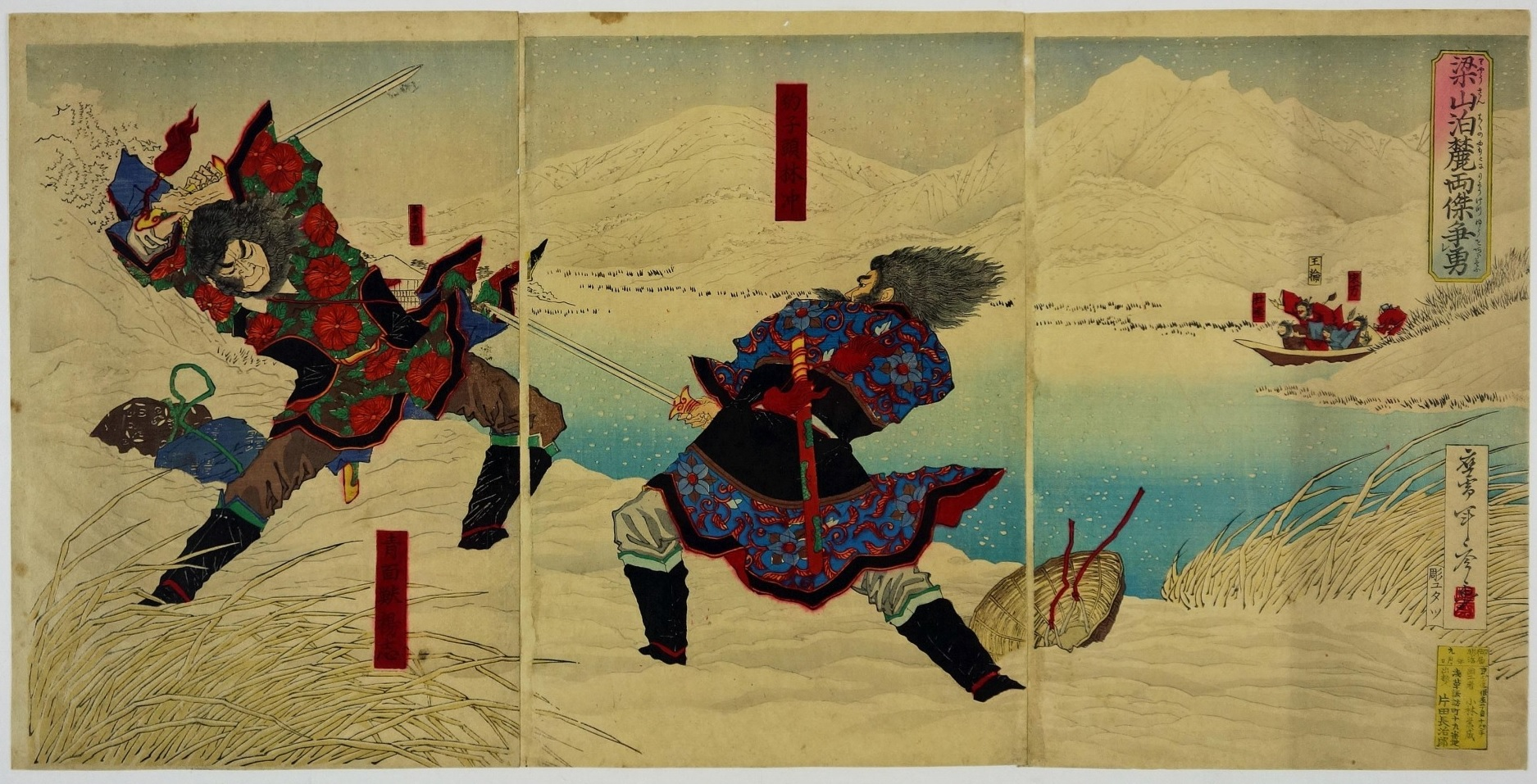
Painting of Yang Zhi and Lin Chong fighting under Mount Liang, based on the Water Margin

The genre of the martial or military romance also developed during the Tang dynasty. In the Ming dynasty (1368–1644), Luo Guanzhong and Shi Nai'an wrote Romance of the Three Kingdoms and Water Margin respectively, which are among the Great Classical Novels of Chinese literature. The former is a romanticised historical retelling of the events in the late Eastern Han dynasty and the Three Kingdoms period, while the latter criticises the deplorable socio-economic status of the late Northern Song dynasty. Water Margin is often seen as the first full-length proto-wuxia novel: the portrayal of the 108 heroes, and their code of honour and willingness to become outlaws rather than serve a corrupt government, played an influential role in the development of jianghu (Jianghu is the setting that wuxia stories inhabit. Literally meaning "rivers and lakes", Jianghu settings are fictionalized versions of China which focus on social underworlds and the marginalized figures which inhabit them.") culture in later centuries. Romance of the Three Kingdoms is also seen as a possible early antecedent and contains classic close-combat descriptions that were later emulated by wuxia writers in their works

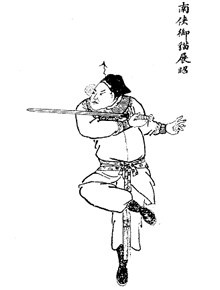
Zhan Zhao, one of the main heroes of The Seven Heroes and Five Gallants

In the Qing dynasty (1644–1911), further developments were the Gong'an (lit. 'public case') and related detective novels, where xia and other heroes, in collaboration with a judge or magistrate, solved crimes and battled injustice. The Justice Bao stories from Sanxia Wuyi (三俠五義; later extended and renamed to Qixia Wuyi) and Xiaowuyi, incorporated much of social justice themes of later wuxia stories. Xiayi stories of chivalrous romance, which frequently featured female heroes and supernatural fighting abilities, also surfaced during the Qing dynasty. Novels such as Shi Gong'an Qiwen (施公案奇聞) and Ernü Yingxiong Zhuan have been cited as the clearest nascent wuxia novels.

The term "wuxia" as a genre label itself first appeared at the end of the Qing dynasty, a calque of the Japanese "bukyō", a genre of oft-militaristic and bushido-influenced adventure fiction. The term was brought to China by writers such as Liang Qichao and students who hoped that China would modernise its military and place emphasis on martial virtues, and it quickly became entrenched as the term used to refer to xiayi and other predecessors of wuxia proper. In Japan, however, the term "bukyō" faded into obscurity.

Many wuxia works produced during the Ming and Qing dynasties were lost due to the governments' crackdown on and banning of such works. Wuxia works like Water Margin were deemed responsible for brewing anti-government sentiments, which led to rebellions in those eras. The departure from mainstream literature also meant that patronage of this genre was limited to the masses and not to the literati, which led to the stifling of the development of the wuxia genre. Nonetheless, the wuxia genre remained enormously popular with the common people.

=== 20th century ===
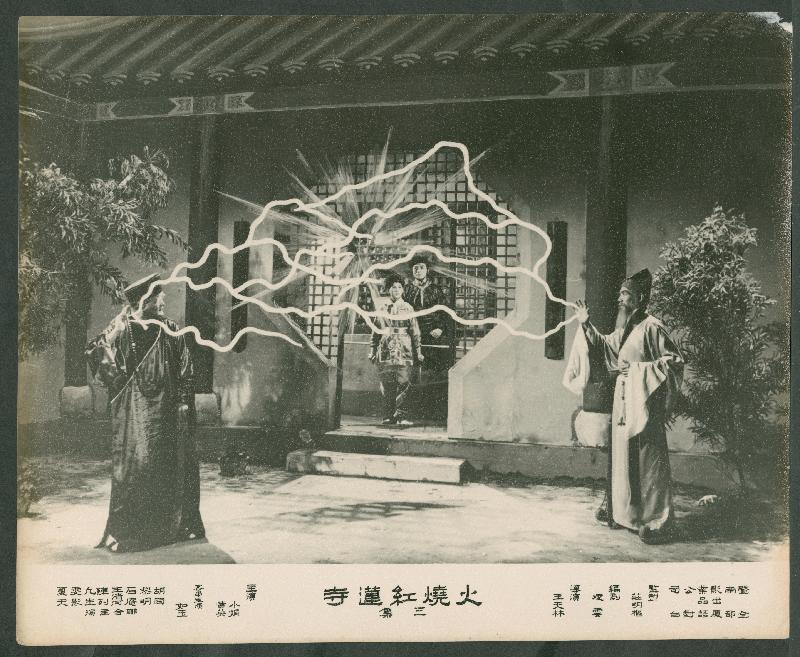
Promotional card for 1928-1931 film The Burning of the Red Lotus Temple, one of the first movies to launch a wuxia craze in cinema history

The modern wuxia genre rose to prominence in the early 20th century after the May Fourth Movement of 1919. A new literature evolved, calling for a break with Confucian values, and the xia emerged as a symbol of personal freedom, defiance to Confucian tradition, and rejection of the Chinese family system.

Xiang Kairan (pen name Pingjiang Buxiaosheng) became the first notable wuxia writer, with his debut novel being The Peculiar Knights-Errant of the Jianghu (江湖奇俠傳). It was serialised from 1921 to 1928 and was adapted into the first wuxia film, The Burning of the Red Lotus Temple (1928). Zhao Huanting (趙煥亭), who wrote Chronicles of the Loyal Knights-Errant (奇俠精忠傳, serialised 1923–27), was another well-known wuxia writer based in Shanghai. Starting from the 1930s, wuxia works proliferated and its centre shifted to Beijing and Tianjin in northern China. The most prolific writers there were collectively referred to as the Five Great Masters of the Northern School (北派五大家): Huanzhulouzhu, who wrote The Swordspeople from Shu Mountains; Gong Baiyu, who wrote Twelve Coin Darts (十二金錢鏢); Wang Dulu, who wrote The Crane-Iron Pentalogy (鹤鉄五部作); Zheng Zhengyin (郑証因), who wrote The King of Eagle Claws (鹰爪王); Zhu Zhenmu (朱貞木), who wrote The Seven 'Kill' Stele (七殺碑).

Wuxia fiction was banned at various times during the Republican era and these restrictions stifled the growth of the genre. In 1949, China also banned martial arts novels as vulgar reading. In Taiwan, the government banned several wuxia works in 1959. Despite this, wuxia prevailed in other Chinese-speaking regions. In Hong Kong, between the 1960s and 1980s, the genre entered a golden age. Writers such as Liang Yusheng and Louis Cha spearheaded the founding of a "new school" of the wuxia genre that differed largely from its predecessors. They wrote serials for newspapers and magazines. They also incorporated several fictional themes such as mystery and romance from other cultures. In Taiwan, Wolong Sheng, Sima Ling, Zhuge Qingyun (諸葛青雲), Shiao Yi and Gu Long became the region's best known wuxia writers. After them, writers such as Woon Swee Oan and Huang Yi rose to prominence in a later period. Chen Yu-hui is a contemporary female wuxia novelist who made her debut with the novel The Tian-Guan Duo Heroes (天觀雙俠).

There have also been works created after the 1980s which attempt to create a post-wuxia genre. Yu Hua, one of the more notable writers from this period, published a counter-genre short story titled Blood and Plum Blossoms, in which the protagonist goes on a quest to avenge his murdered father.

=== Influence and dissemination ===
As works from Hong Kong, Taiwan, and mainland China gained popularity in Asia in the 20th and 21st centuries, creators in Korea, Japan, and Southeast Asia began to draw influence from them, including from Wuxia and other martial arts genres.

==== Works influenced by, remade, or adapted from Chinese wuxia and martial arts ====
===== Korea =====
- Warrior Baek Dong-soo
- Arthdal Chronicles
- Memories of the Sword
- Gu Family Book
- Iljimae
- The Return of Iljimae

===== Japan =====
- Thunderbolt Fantasy
- Ranma ½
- YuYu Hakusho
- Kenji (manga)
- Fist of the North Star
- Kenichi: The Mightiest Disciple

== Themes, plots and settings ==
A 17th-century woodblock print of a scene from a play on the Kunlun Nu story

Modern wuxia stories are largely set in ancient or pre-modern China. The historical setting can range from being quite specific and important to the story, to being vaguely defined, anachronistic, or mainly for use as a backdrop. Elements of fantasy, such as the use of magic powers and appearance of supernatural beings, are common in some wuxia stories but are not a prerequisite of the wuxia genre. However, the martial arts element is a definite part of a wuxia tale, as the characters must know some form of martial arts. Themes of romance are also strongly featured in some wuxia tales.

A typical wuxia story features a young male protagonist who experiences a tragedy – such as the loss of his loved ones – and goes on to undertake several trials and tribulations to learn several forms of martial arts from various fighters. At the end of the story, he emerges as a powerful fighter whom few can equal. He uses his abilities to follow the code of xia and mends the ills of the jianghu. For instance, the opening chapters of some of Jin Yong's works follow a certain pattern: a tragic event occurs, usually one that costs the lives of the newly introduced characters, and then it sets events into motion that will culminate in the primary action of the story.

Other stories use different structures. For instance, the protagonist is denied admission into a martial arts school. He experiences hardships and trains secretly and waits until there is an opportunity for him to show off his skills and surprise those who initially looked down on him. Some stories feature a mature hero with powerful martial arts abilities confronting an equally powerful antagonist as his nemesis. The plot will gradually meander to a final dramatic showdown between the protagonist and his nemesis. These types of stories were prevalent during the era of anti-Qing revolutionaries.

Certain stories have unique plots, such as those by Gu Long and Huang Yi. Gu Long's works have an element of mystery and are written like detective stories. The protagonist, usually a formidable martial artist and intelligent problem-solver, embarks on a quest to solve a mystery such as a murder case. Huang Yi's stories are blended with science fiction.

Despite these genre-blending elements, wuxia is primarily a historical genre of fiction. Notwithstanding this, wuxia writers openly admit that they are unable to capture the entire history of a course of events and instead choose to structure their stories along the pattern of the protagonist's progression from childhood to adulthood instead. The progression may be symbolic rather than literal, as observed in Jin Yong's The Smiling, Proud Wanderer, where Linghu Chong progresses from childish concerns and dalliances into much more adult ones as his unwavering loyalty repeatedly thrusts him into the rocks of betrayal at the hands of his inhumane master.

=== Code of xia ===
The eight common attributes of the xia are listed as benevolence, justice, individualism, loyalty, courage, truthfulness, disregard for wealth, and desire for glory. Apart from individualism, these characteristics are similar to Confucian values such as ren (仁; "benevolence", "kindness"), zhong (忠; "loyalty"), yong (勇; "courage", "bravery") and yi (義; "righteousness"). The code of xia also emphasises the importance of repaying benefactors after having received deeds of en (恩; "grace", "favour") from others, as well as seeking chou (仇; "vengeance", "revenge") to bring villains to justice. However, the importance of vengeance is controversial, as a number of wuxia works stress Buddhist ideals, which include forgiveness, compassion and a prohibition on killing. While borrowing ideas from the better known Confucian values, the root of xia originated from the lesser known Mohism, which in the Warring States period saw a few Mohists stood up to defend kingdoms being attacked by other kingdoms.

In the jianghu, martial artists are expected to be loyal to their master (shifu). This gives rise to the formation of several complex trees of master-apprentice relations as well as the various schools such as Shaolin and Wudang. If there are any disputes between fighters, they will choose the honourable way of settling their issues through fighting in duels.

=== Skills and abilities ===
The martial arts in wuxia stories are based on wushu techniques and other real life Chinese martial arts. In wuxia tales, however, the mastery of such skills are highly exaggerated to superhuman levels of achievement and prowess.

The following is a list of skills and abilities a typical fighter in a wuxia story possesses:

- Martial arts: Fighting techniques in a codified sequence called zhaoshi (招式), which are based on real life Chinese martial arts.
- Weapons and objects: Combatants use a wide range of weapons in combat. The most commonly used ones are the dao (broadsword or saber), jian (sword), gun (staff), and qiang (spear). Everyday objects such as abaci, benches, fans, ink brushes, smoking pipes, sewing needles, or various musical instruments, are also used as weapons as well.
- Qinggong: A form of real Chinese martial arts. In wuxia fiction, however, its use is exaggerated to the point that characters can circumvent gravity to fly, cover tremendous distances in a single stride, run across surfaces of water, mount trees, and jump over or scale high walls.
- Neili (内力; lit "internal force" or "internal strength")/Neigong: The ability to build up and cultivate inner energy known as qi and use it for offensive or defensive purposes. Characters use this energy to attain skills such as superhuman strength, speed, stamina, endurance, and healing, as well as the ability to project energy beams and elemental forces from their bodies.
- Dianxue (literally "touching acupuncture points"): Characters use various acupuncture techniques to kill, paralyse, immobilise or even manipulate opponents by attacking their acupressure points with their bare hands or weapons. Such techniques can also be used for healing purposes, such as halting excessive bleeding. Real life martial artists do use such techniques to paralyse or stun their opponents. However, their effectiveness is highly exaggerated in wuxia stories.

In wuxia stories, characters attain the above skills and abilities by devoting themselves to years of diligent study and exercise, but can also have such power conferred upon them by a master who transfers his energy to them. The instructions to mastering these skills through training are found in secret manuals known as miji (秘笈). In some stories, specific skills can be learned by spending several years in seclusion with a master or training with a group of fighters.

=== Menpai ===
Menpai (门派) is often translated as sect, school, society, church, house, or cult. Members of the same menpai follow the guidance and train under the same leader. If the members of the menpai are related, then it can be translated as clan. Since some of the menpai are religiously affiliated, "sect" has come to be a common translation for the non-family based menpai. However, it would be inaccurate to use sect to denote menpais that are not associated with religion.

== Literature ==
Notable modern wuxia writers include:

Name	Pen name	Active years	Some works	Brief description
Louis Cha Leung-yung; Zha Liangyong 查良鏞	Jin Yong 金庸	1955–72	The Book and the Sword, Condor Trilogy, Demi-Gods and Semi-Devils, The Smiling, Proud Wanderer, The Deer and the Cauldron	The most popular, and regarded by some as the most accomplished, writer to date. His works have been adapted into films and television series numerous times.
Chen Wentong 陳文統	Liang Yusheng 梁羽生	1954–83	Qijian Xia Tianshan, Datang Youxia Zhuan, Baifa Monü Zhuan, Saiwai Qixia Zhuan, Yunhai Yugong Yuan, Xiagu Danxin	The pioneer of the "new school" wuxia genre. Some of his works were adapted into films and television series.
Xiong Yaohua 熊耀華	Gu Long 古龍	1960–85	Chu Liuxiang Series, Juedai Shuangjiao, Xiao Shiyi Lang, Xiaoli Feidao Series, Lu Xiaofeng Series	A writer who blends elements of mystery in his works. He writes in short paragraphs and is influenced stylistically by Western and Japanese writers. Some of his works were adapted into films and television series.
Shiao Ching-Jen 萧敬人	Shiao Yi 萧逸	1960–2017	Iron Geese, Wings of Frost, Princess Wuyou, Sister Gan Nineteen, Beautiful Swordswoman, Chronicles of the Immortal Swordsmen	Pioneered a Taoist-infused, emotionally rich style that emphasized the moral code of xia (chivalry) over martial prowess. Shiao Yi's narratives often featured transcendent heroes, including strong female protagonists, and integrated romantic and philosophical depth.
Woon Liang Geok; Wen Liangyu 溫涼玉	Woon Swee Oan; Wen Rui'an 溫瑞安	1973–present	Si Da Ming Bu, Buyi Shenxiang, Jingyan Yi Qiang	His works were adapted into the television series The Four and Face to Fate, and the film The Four.
Huang Zuqiang 黃祖強	Huang Yi 黃易	1987–2017	Xunqin Ji, Fuyu Fanyun, Datang Shuanglong Zhuan	Combines wuxia with science fiction in his works. His works were adapted into the television series A Step into the Past, Lethal Weapons of Love and Passion and Twin of Brothers.
Lau Wai Ming 劉偉明	Jozev Kiu 喬靖夫	1996–present	Blood and Steel	Redefined Wuxia fiction from the traditional emphasis on the code of chivalry and Chinese culture.

== Comics ==
New and original wuxia writings have dwindled significantly in modern times, particularly so as patronage and readerships of the genre decimated due to readily available alternatives in entertainment such as DVDs, gaming consoles, and other newer forms of entertainment. However, the genre has persisted in the form of manhua (Chinese comics) in places like Hong Kong and Taiwan, with the core essentials of the wuxia genre living on in weekly editions equivalent to the Japanese manga. Some notable comic artists are listed as follows:

Name	Pseudonym	Active years	Some works	Brief description
Wong Jan-lung; Huang Zhenlong 黃振隆	Wong Yuk-long; Huang Yulang 黃玉郎	1970–present	Oriental Heroes, Weapons of the Gods, Legend of Emperors, Buddha's Palm	Some of his works were adapted into films and television series like Dragon Tiger Gate, Kung Fu VS Acrobatic, and The Buddhism Palm Strikes Back.
Ma Wing-shing; Ma Rongcheng 馬榮城	Ma Wing-shing; Ma Rongcheng 馬榮成	1975–present	Fung Wan, Chinese Hero, Black Leopard	Some of his works were adapted into films and television series such as The Storm Riders, Wind and Cloud, The Blood Sword, and A Man Called Hero.
Khoo Fuk-lung; Qiu Fulong 邱福龍		1980–present	Saint, Solar Lord	

== Film and television ==
The earliest wuxia films date back to the 1920s. Extant early wuxia films produced in China include Red Heroine (1929), Woman Warrior White Rose (1929), and Woman Warrior of the Wild River 6: Rumble at Deerhorn Gully (1930), the sixth film in a series. Hua Mu Lan (1939), another surviving film, is considered a representative of the second wave of wuxia films, during the Anti-Japanese War. Films directed by King Hu and produced by the Shaw Brothers Studio featured sophisticated action choreography using wire and trampoline assisted acrobatics combined with sped-up camera techniques. The storylines in the early films were loosely adapted from existing literature.

Cheng Pei-pei, Jimmy Wang Yu, Feng Hsu, and Connie Chan are among the better known wuxia movie stars in the 1960s–70s, when films made by King Hu and the Shaw Brothers Studio were most prominent. More recent wuxia movie actors and actresses include Jet Li, Brigitte Lin, Michelle Yeoh, Donnie Yen, Tony Leung and Zhang Ziyi. Yuen Woo-ping is a choreographer who achieved fame by crafting action-sequences in wuxia films.

Wuxia was introduced to Hollywood studios in 2000 by Ang Lee's Crouching Tiger, Hidden Dragon, though influence of the genre was previously seen in the United States in the 1970s television series Kung Fu. Following in Lee's footsteps, Zhang Yimou made Hero, targeted for the international market in 2002, House of Flying Daggers in 2004, Curse of the Golden Flower in 2006 and Shadow in 2018. Western audiences were also introduced to wuxia through Asian television stations in larger cities, which featured miniseries such as Warriors of the Yang Clan and Paradise, often with English subtitles.

Ash Is Purest White, a 2018 Chinese drama directed by Jia Zhangke, is a modern film that refers to the underworld interpretation of jianghu. It was selected to compete for the Palme d'Or at the 2018 Cannes Film Festival. The story is loosely based on the leader of a gang from Jia Zhangke's childhood, whom he had admired as a role model. Like the rest of Jia's films, it opened to widespread acclaim.

There have been Western attempts at the genre, such as the 2008 film The Forbidden Kingdom, which starred Jackie Chan, Jet Li and Michael Angarano; other movies including wuxia elements are the first three in The Matrix film series (1999–2003, the fourth film from 2021 was choreographed by Joshua Grothe) and the Kill Bill films from 2003 to 2004, all of which were choreographed by Yuen Woo-ping. Perhaps the most successful example was DreamWorks Animation's media franchise Kung Fu Panda. Created as an earnest, if humorous, emulation by producers who were knowledgeable admirers of the genre, the series has been particularly hailed in China as an excellent contribution to the form. From the 1990s–2000s, Hong Kong stars Daniel Wu and Stephen Fung have worked with AMC Networks to bring wuxia to a US television audience with Into the Badlands, which premiered in 2015 and ran for three seasons.

In 2013, Keanu Reeves directed and starred as the main antagonist in Man of Tai Chi, with Tiger Chen as a martial artist attending underground fights. The Mulan remake in 2020 was Disney's attempt in making a wuxia movie. In 2021, Marvel's Shang-Chi opens with a wuxia sequence and has action sequences inspired by Jackie Chan.

== Video games ==
Some notable wuxia video games of the action RPG genre include The Legend of Sword and Fairy, Xuan-Yuan Sword, Jade Empire, and Kingdom of Paradise, all of which blend wuxia with elements of Chinese mythology and fantasy. The Legend of Sword and Fairy, in particular, expanded into a franchise of eight video games, two of which were adapted into the television series Chinese Paladin (2005) and Chinese Paladin 3 (2009). There are also MMORPGs, such as JX Online 3, Heroes of Kung Fu and Age of Wulin, and hack and slash games, such as Bujingai and Heavenly Sword.

Games adapted from the works of wuxia writers include Heroes of Jin Yong, an RPG based on characters in Jin Yong's novels; Dragon Oath, an MMORPG inspired by Jin Yong's Demi-Gods and Semi-Devils; and Martial Kingdoms, a strategy game featuring several martial arts schools which commonly appear in wuxia fiction.

The wuxia genre continues to be drawn as a pool of inspiration or source material for Chinese video game studios. In June 2022, Tencent's Lightspeed Studio released a demo trailer on Code: To Jin Yong. In the following month, Everstone Studio unveiled Where Winds Meet, a game compared to Ghost of Tsushima and Assassin's Creed. 2023 saw the release of Hero's Adventure: Road to Passion in November, a wuxia-inspired open world RPG, as well as Wandering Sword in September, a RPG featuring an art style reminiscent of HD-2D.

== See also ==
- Martial arts film
- Chivalric romance and historical fantasy — Western fantasy genres similar in concept to wuxia
- Xianxia — a high fantasy genre, with more supernatural power.
- Sword and sorcery — a Western fantasy genre similar to xianxia
- Zhou Tong (archer)
- Guzhuang ancient Chinese-style costume, typically used in Xianxia and Wuxia
- Wuxia video games
