= Wu Suxin =

Chinese actress active from 1925 to 1931

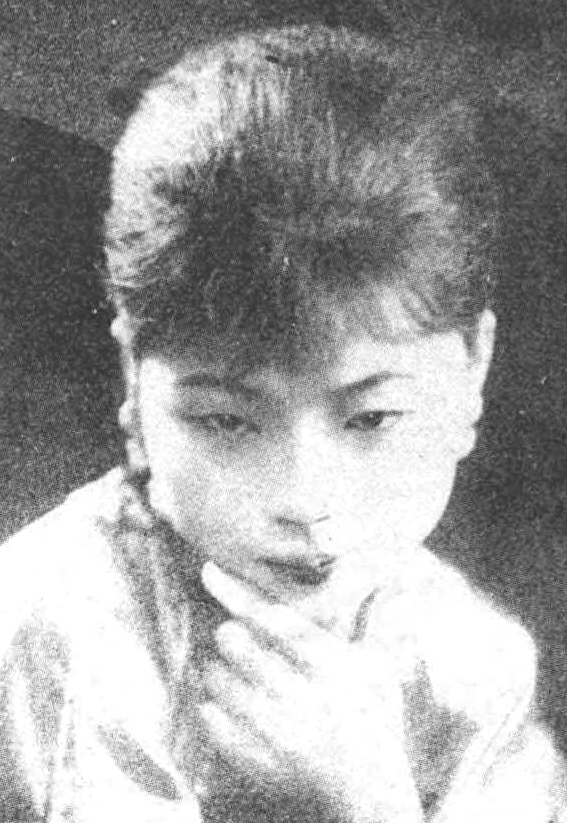
- Wu, 1927
- Born: 吴宝蝉; 吳寶蟬; 1905 or 1906; Xiangshan County, Guangdong
- Other names: White Rose Woo
- Occupation: Actress
- Years active: 1925-1931

Chinese name
- Traditional Chinese: 吳素馨
- Simplified Chinese: 吴素馨
Transcriptions
Standard Mandarin
- Hanyu Pinyin: Wú Sùxīn
- Wade–Giles: Wu^{2} Su^{4}hsin^{1}
Yue: Cantonese
- Jyutping: Ng^{4} Sou^{3}hing^{1}

Wu Suxin (traditional Chinese: 吳素馨; simplified Chinese: 吴素馨; pinyin: Wú Sùxīn, fl. 1925–1931), also credited as White Rose Woo, was a Chinese actress of the silent era. Trained at the Far East Film College, she completed seven films for the Tianyi Film Company between 1925 and 1927 before migrating to the Huaju Film Company. There, she became the company's lead female star, appearing in almost all of its films – generally as a wuxia heroine. After Huaju closed, Wu worked briefly with the Dahua Film Company before focusing on the stage.

== Biography ==
Wu was born Wu Baodiao (吴宝蝉; 吳寶蟬) in 1905 or 1906 in Xiangshan County, Guangdong. She attended the Kai Xiu Senior Girls School in Shanghai, then later studied acting at the Far East Film College.

Wu rose to prominence in the Shanghai film industry in the mid-1920s, first joining the Tianyi Film Company in 1925. She completed nine films with the company, including Heroine Li Feifei (1925), in which she portrayed a young woman who is almost driven to suicide after her engagement is threatened by a conniving manipulator. She played supporting roles in several films starring Hu Die, including Repentance (1925) and The Traumatic Romance of Liang and Zhu (1926).

In 1927, Wu joined the newly-established studio Huaju, completing some 22 films for the company; this represented almost the entirety of the studio's output. Wu took the English-language name White Rose Woo, which the film scholar Bao Weihong reads as a homage to the serial queen actress Pearl White, whose The Perils of Pauline had found great popularity in China. Wu gained a reputation for action, frequently being depicted as fighting men, and most of the films she did for Huaju were in the wuxia genre. She was often portrayed alongside studio co-founder Zhang Huimin, whom she was dating.

Wu made her debut for Huaju in 1927's White Lotus. Later that year she portrayed a young woman who works with another woman to rescue her kidnapped boyfriend from bandits in Lustrous Pearls (1927). Several of her films had her take gender disguise roles, including The Bandit of Shandong (1927) and The Wife of the Detective (1928); both films included sequences wherein a woman attempted to woo Wu's male-passing character. In The Valiant Girl White Rose (1929), Wu portrayed a teenage athlete who disguises herself as a man to save her father; she also served as assistant director on the film. Another film, Orphan in the Storm (1929), was a melodrama.

Huaju closed in 1931 as wuxia films were banned by the Kuomintang government for spreading superstition. Wu migrated to the Dahua Film Company, where she appeared in that company's adaptation of Zhang Henshui's novel Fate in Tears and Laughter playing the dual role of servant and abandoned wife. This film was one of two adaptations of the novel made that year, with the Mingxing Film Company making its own adaptation with Hu Die in the same roles. This resulted in a legal battle over filming rights, which ended with Mingxing having the right to release its version.

Wu had left the Shanghai film industry by 1933. She spent the 1930s on stage, touring through the Republic of China and later in Southeast Asia. Records of her activities afterwards are lacking, though she was reported to be appearing with Yang Naimei and Zhang Zhiyun in cameos in the Hong Kong musical comedy Heavenly Beauty. Of Wu's films, most have been lost. Orphan in the Storm has survived in its entirety. Meanwhile, only 27 minutes of The Valiant Girl White Rose are extant.

== Works cited ==
- 走出了影界的女星 [Actresses Who Left the Film Industry]. Ling Long (in Chinese). Shanghai. 20 December 1933. p. 2561.
- Bao, Weihong (2005). "From Pearl White to White Rose Woo: Tracing the Vernacular Body of Nüxia in Chinese Silent Cinema, 1927-1931". Camera Obscura. 20 (3): 193–231. doi:10.1215/02705346-20-3_60-193.
- "Heroine Li Feifei (1925) and "Shuomingshu"". The Chinese Mirror: A Journal of Chinese Film History. Archived from the original on 2 December 2013.
- Huang, Xuelei (2014). Shanghai Filmmaking: Crossing Borders, Connecting to the Globe, 1922–1938. Leiden: Brill. ISBN 978-90-04-27933-9.
- Rea, Christopher (2019). "Woman Warrior White Rose". Chinese Film Classics. Archived from the original on 14 December 2024.
- Lee, Lily Xiao Hong (2015). "Hu Die". In Lee, Lily Xiao Hong; Stefanowska, A.D. (eds.). Biographical Dictionary of Chinese Women: The Twentieth Century, 1912–2000. London and New York: Routledge. pp. 236–242. ISBN 978-0-7656-0043-1.
- "Wu Suxin, Zhang Huimin, and the Huaju Studio Silents". The Chinese Mirror: A Journal of Chinese Film History. Archived from the original on 29 May 2010.
- Zhang, Zhen (2005). An Amorous History of the Silver Screen: Shanghai Cinema, 1896–1937. Chicago: University of Chicago Press. ISBN 978-0-226-98238-0.
