= Martial Kingdoms =

2003 Taiwanese video game

- Developer: T-Time Technology
- Platform: Microsoft Windows
- Release: 2003
- Genre: Strategy
- Mode: Single player

Martial Kingdoms (天下霸圖; tiānxià bà tú) is a 2003 Taiwanese single-player strategy video game developed by T-Time Technology. The plot is based on wuxia novels and set in the wulin (martial artists' community) of 16th-century China. It has a sequel, Martial Kingdoms 2, which was released in 2007.

== Gameplay ==
The player chooses one from 13 martial arts organisations to play as, and must conquer the others to rule the wulin (martial artists' community) and win the game. At the start of the game, each organisation controls at least one base out of 20, all located on a map of China. An organisation is conquered when it loses all its bases or when its leader is killed.

There are different ways for an organisation to increase its strength and power:

- Recruiting and training new members
- Taking control of unoccupied bases or conquering bases controlled by other organisations, so as to acquire more resources such as gold, wood and iron ore.
- Upgrading its factories to produce weapons, equipment and medicine of better quality
- Discovering and learning more powerful skills through studying and gaining experience from battles
- Forming alliances with other organisations
- Attracting special characters (seven in total) to join the organisation

The player can manage members and arrange their daily schedules to determine how much time each member spends on a certain task (e.g. collecting resources, making items, training) and what skill the member will be learning.

== Plot ==
The game is set in 16th-century China during the reign of the Jiajing Emperor of the Ming dynasty. Deceived by the corrupt chancellor Yan Song, the emperor fears that the martial artists' community will pose a threat to him. He sends the secret police to stir up conflict among the various organisations in the hope that they will destroy each other.

There are four storylines that the player can choose from. In each storyline, the number of bases occupied by each organisation at the beginning is different and some organisations appear only in certain storylines. The player also has the option to create and play as a new organisation.

The 20 bases are:

- Qilian Mountains
- Mount Hua
- Mount Heng
- Shuntian Prefecture
- Changbai Mountains
- Mount Tai
- Mount Song
- Wudang Mountains
- Yingtian Prefecture
- Mount Emei
- Wu Mountains
- Dongting Lake
- Huangshan
- Tiantai Mountain
- Wuyi Mountains
- Lingnan
- Liuzhou
- Jiaozhou
- Dian Lake
- Guizhou

The 12 default organisations featured in the game are:

- Demonic Cult (魔教; Mó Jiào)
- Beggars' Gang (丐幫; Gài Bāng)
- Shaolin Monastery (少林寺; Shàolín Sìì)
- Wudang School (武當派; Wǔdāng Pài)
- Emei School (峨嵋派; Éméi Pài),
- Mount Hua School (華山派; Huàshān Pài)
- Mount Wu School (巫山派; Wūshān Pài)
- Dongting Gang (洞庭幫; Dòngtíng Bāng)
- Taiyi Sect (太乙教; Tàiyì Jiào)
- Baoxiang Monastery (寶相寺; Bǎoxiāng Sì)
- Heroes School (英雄門; Yīngxióng Mén)
- Shennong Gang (神農幫; Shénnóng Bāng)

== See also ==
- List of organisations in wuxia fiction
- Xuanyuan Jian
- The Legend of Sword and Fairy
- Jade Empire
- Bujingai
- Heavenly Sword
- Heroes of Jin Yong
- Dragon Oath
