= Wong Yuk-long =

Hong Kong manhua artist, publisher and actor (born 1950)

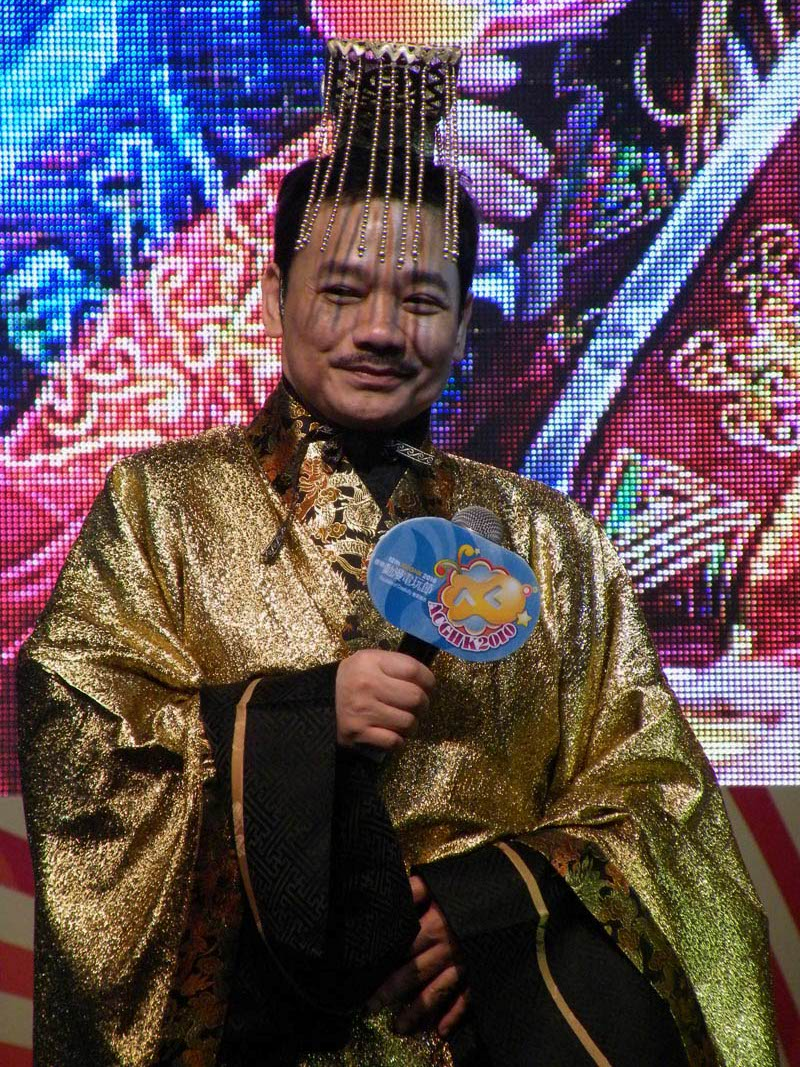
- Wong at the Animation-Comic-Game Hong Kong in 2010
- Born: Wong Chun-loong (黃振隆); 27 March 1950 (age 76) Jiangmen, Guangdong, China
- Areas: Writer, Artist, Publisher
- Pseudonym: Tony Wong
- Notable works: Oriental Heroes; Weapons of the Gods

Wong Yuk-long
- Traditional Chinese: 黃玉郎
- Simplified Chinese: 黄玉郎
Transcriptions
Standard Mandarin
- Hanyu Pinyin: Huáng Yùláng
Yue: Cantonese
- Jyutping: Wong4 Juk6-long4

Wong Chun-loong
- Traditional Chinese: 黃振隆
- Simplified Chinese: 黄振隆
Transcriptions
Standard Mandarin
- Hanyu Pinyin: Huáng Zhènlóng
Yue: Cantonese
- Jyutping: Wong4 Zan3-lung4

Tony Wong Chun-loong (born 27 March 1950), better known by his pseudonyms Wong Yuk-long or Tony Wong, is a Hong Kong manhua artist, publisher and actor, who wrote and created Little Rascals (later re-titled Oriental Heroes) and Weapons of the Gods. He also wrote adaptations of Louis Cha's novels, such as The Return of the Condor Heroes (retitled as Legendary Couples), Demi-Gods and Semi-Devils, and Ode to Gallantry. For his contribution and influencing a generation of artists in the local industry, he is regarded as the "Godfather of Hong Kong comics" or "Hong Kong's King of Comics".

He provided the art for Batman: Hong Kong, which was written by Doug Moench. He has also acted in some films occasionally, including making a cameo appearance in Dragon Tiger Gate (a film adapted from Oriental Heroes).

== History ==
=== Early life ===
Tony Wong Chun-loong was born on 27 March 1950 in Jiangmen, Guangdong, China. After he turned six, he moved to Hong Kong with his family. He went to school until age 13, after which he began his artistic career. Wong never attended an educational institution focusing on art, and was largely self-taught as a comic artist. His decision to begin working at 13 was because he could command a relatively high salary at that time.

=== Career ===
In 1971, Wong created Jademan Holdings, which became one of the most prominent comic publishing companies in Hong Kong. Under Jademan Holdings, Wong published many popular manhua series, including Little Rascals (later renamed Oriental Heroes), which became one of the best-selling comics in Hong Kong. According to Monica Ko of the South China Morning Post, because of Wong's dominant profile in the company, the company's stock became known as "personality stock". In 1989, he lost his position at Jademan by resigning, ending his involvement in the company's comics.

Wong also adapted several of Louis Cha's classic wuxia novels into manhua, including The Return of the Condor Heroes (retitled Legendary Couples), Demi-Gods and Semi-Devils, and Ode to Gallantry. He later provided the artwork for Batman: Hong Kong, written by Doug Moench, demonstrating his international reach as a comic artist.

=== Legal issues and return ===
At some point Wong was convicted in Hong Kong courts of a financial offense. He received a 2.5-year prison sentence and was sent to Stanley Prison, but was released after serving one year and six months. Despite his imprisonment, Wong remained a popular figure; in 1993, the South China Morning Post reported that "Despite his jailing, Mr Wong,[...] is still seen as a hero by young people in the territory."

After his release from prison, Wong established Jade Dynasty Publications, with the stated intention of creating what he described as "an oriental [sic] type of Walt Disney."

=== Later career ===
In 2015, Wong announced plans to establish a comics-themed park in Hangzhou, Mainland China, with a proposed budget of HK$800,000,000 Hong Kong dollars. Wong expressed some disappointment that the park could not be built in Hong Kong itself.

== Selected works ==
- The Force of Buddha's Palm (如來神掌), based on Gu Long's Juedai Shuangjiao
- Dream of Ten Billion, 1994, autobiographical.
- Demi-Gods and Semi-Devils (天龍八部), based on Louis Cha's novel of the same title.
- Dino Crisis (恐龍危機), based on the Capcom game of the same name.
- Drunken Fist (醉拳)
- Jackie Chan's Fantasia (奇幻龙宝)
- Legendary Couples (神鵰俠侶; "Companion of the Condor Hero"), based on Louis Cha's novel The Return of the Condor Heroes.
- Legend of Emperors (天子傳奇; "Emperor Legend"), featuring fictionalised stories of various Chinese kings and emperors.
- Mega Dragon and Tiger (龍虎5世; "Dragon and Tiger V")
- Oriental Heroes (龍虎門 Long Hu Men; "Dragon-Tiger-Gate"), originally titled Little Rascals (小流氓).
- Ultraman Tiga based on television series of the same title, illustrated by Khoo Fuk-lung
- Weapons of the Gods (神兵玄奇; "Mysterious Weapons of the Gods").

== See also ==
- Hong Kong comics
