= Oriental Heroes =

1970 martial arts manhua

- Cover of Oriental Heroes vol. 288, art by Tony Wong

龍虎門 lung4 fu2 mun4 (Cantonese) Lóng Hǔ Mén (Mandarin)
- Genre: Kung Fu
- Author: Tony Wong Yuk-long
- Publisher: Jade Dynasty
- English publisher: HK: Jademan
- Original run: 1970 – Present

Oriental Heroes
- Traditional Chinese: 龍虎門
- Simplified Chinese: 龙虎门
- Literal meaning: Dragon Tiger Gate
Transcriptions
Standard Mandarin
- Hanyu Pinyin: Lóng Hǔ Mén
Yue: Cantonese
- Yale Romanization: Lùhng Fú Mùhn
- Jyutping: lung4 fu2 mun4

Little Rascals
- Chinese: 小流氓
Transcriptions
Standard Mandarin
- Hanyu Pinyin: Xiǎo Liúmáng
Yue: Cantonese
- Yale Romanization: Síu Làuh Màhn
- Jyutping: siu2 lau4 man4

Oriental Heroes is a popular Hong Kong–based manhua created by Tony Wong Yuk-long, a writer/artist responsible for also creating a number of other popular manhua titles. It was created in 1970, and it continues to be published today. The book was the first Hong Kong manhua title based on action and fighting, often borrowing from the wuxia literary world. It established a new action genre of Hong Kong manhua and spawned many imitators. The theme of its stories often revolves around brotherhood and the fight for justice.

Connie Lam, the director of the Hong Kong Arts Centre, stated that the manhua was "the icon for jungle survival" and a "fantasy" in which people of lower socioeconomic backgrounds improve their standing through physical combat. Wong Yat-hei of the South China Morning Post wrote that this work was "the first manhua to feature action and fighting". Lee Wing-sze, also of the SCMP, described the series as "Wong's most crucial work."

Jademan Comics published the comics in English, and these were distributed in the United States. The U.S. National Coalition of Television Violence (NCTV) rated this series "XUnfit" due to the violence it has.

The 2006 movie Dragon Tiger Gate was based on this manhua.

== Name ==
Oriental Heroes is the book's official English name. Its Chinese name is pronounced in Cantonese, Lùhng Fú Mùhn (simplified Chinese: 龙虎门; traditional Chinese: 龍虎門; pinyin: Lóng Hǔ Mén). This name translates as "Dragon Tiger Gate" in English, and is in reference to the name of the fictional kungfu school and organization that is a major subject matter in the book.

Its original name is also translated as "Little Rogues". The series has also been called "Tiger Wong".

== History ==
Oriental Heroes was first published in 1970 under the title Little Rascals (Chinese: 小流氓; Cantonese Yale: Síu Làuh Màhn). It featured stories about young people living in public housing estates in Hong Kong fighting gangsters and criminals. The heroes of the stories exhibited antisocial behaviours, but routinely fought for justice. In the early years of the book's run, the fighting was very graphically illustrated. Various weapons were used, where spilled blood, internal organs, guts, and bones were shown in the injuries that the characters sustained. People criticised the graphic violence depicted in Oriental Heroes and other similar action genre manhua, eventually leading to the enactment of the Indecent Publication Law in 1975, banning explicit violence in manhua.

As the Indecent Publication Law only applied to manhua, Wong Yuk-long established a daily newspaper, called Sàng Bou (simplified Chinese: 生报; traditional Chinese: 生報; pinyin: Shēng Bào), with which to publish Oriental Heroes. In the first month of Sàng Bou's run, the newspaper published actual news together with various manhua titles, including Oriental Heroes on the back cover. After a month, Sàng Bou switched to a manhua-only daily newspaper. Oriental Heroes was published daily in the newspaper, and a full week's stories were collected and published in book form every week. Wong Yuk-long changed the name of the book to its current name of Lùhng Fú Mùhn, with the English name of Oriental Heroes. He also explored less graphic means of depicting violence and altered his drawing technique.

Lee Wing-sze of the South China Morning Post wrote that the work at the time "reflected the grass-roots culture of the 70s."

Responding to the success of writer Ma Wing Shing's manhua, Chinese Hero, Wong Yuk-long modified Oriental Heroes again in the mid-1980s. The drawing style began to use a style described by Tim Pilcher and Brad Brooks in their 2005 book The Essential Guide to World Comics as "more realistic," and the stories became more serious and less comical. After 1991, Oriental Heroes started being drawn by other artists instead of by Wong Yuk-long himself.

== Main characters ==
The stories in Oriental Heroes mostly center around three main characters who are leaders of the kung-fu organization and school, Dragon Tiger Gate.

The South China Morning Post described the main protagonists as "young, streetwise delinquents".

Lee Wing-sze wrote in 2006 that Tiger Wong and Little Dragon "became heroes to many young people."

=== Tiger Wong ===
Eighteen years old and with a strong sense of justice, Tiger Wong, known in Chinese versions as Wong Siu-fu (Note: Tiger Wong / Wong Siu-fu: Chinese: 王小虎; Jyutping: wong4 siu2 fu2; pinyin: Wáng Xiǎohǔ; lit. 'Little Tiger'), fights to protect the weak from those who would oppress them. He is both calm and courageous, fighting against powerful and evil forces without any fear. Being from a family of martial artists, he is a naturally talented fighter. His signature technique is the Wong Family's 18 Dragon Slayer Kicks, invented by his grandfather. Besides his family kung fu, he also invented a kicking technique named Leuih Dihn Sahn Teui (Chinese: 雷電神腿); the name of this technique translates to "Thunder and Lightning Kick". Tiger's Chinese name means "Little Tiger". In English translations, he is called "Tiger Wong".

At first, he only mastered Taming The Tiger Fist (Gong Zi Fu Hu Quan) and Tiger Crane Paired Form Fist (Hu He Shuang Xing Quan), both of which are his family kung fu. Later on, after meeting his eldest uncle, Wong Jiang Long, he was able to learn the legendary Wong Family's 18 Dragonslayer Kicks. As the story progresses, his kung fu skills are also developing, either by improving his current technique or learning an entirely new skill. Subsequently, he learns "Nine Suns" Chi kung. This dramatically raises the power of his moves.

Andrea Chen of the South China Morning Post described Tiger as "the most popular cartoon character of the 1980s."

=== Little Dragon ===
Little Dragon, known in Chinese versions as Wong Siu-lung (Note: Little Dragon / Wong Siu-lung: traditional Chinese: 王小龍; simplified Chinese: 王小龙; Jyutping: wong4 siu2 lung4; pinyin: Wáng Xiǎolóng; lit. 'Little Dragon') is twenty years old and is the elder half-brother of Tiger by the same father. Sentimental and a loner, he values righteousness but is an indecisive person. When he was little, his mother left his father after finding out that he secretly had married another woman, Tiger's mother. The heartache she suffered had caused her to die miserably, which caused him to be raised in the orphanage. Lacking proper care, he turned into a rascal, eventually becoming a gang member. As a gang member, he even fought Tiger once, before they realized they were brothers. Although he was finally reformed and had a good relationship with his brother, Little Dragon is still unable to forgive Tiger's parents, whom he felt responsible for his mother's sufferings and miserable death. His Chinese name means "Little Dragon". In English translations, he is called "Little Dragon" or "Dragon Wong".

Even though he came from a family of martial artists, he didn't learn the family kung fu because he was taken away by his mother at a very young age. Instead, he learned Eight Trigrams Palm (Bagua Zhang) and staff style at the beginning of the story. After he's reunited with his brother and uncle, he also learned the Wong Family's 18 Dragonslayer Kicks. However, he modified the style and uses his hands – instead of his feet – to perform them. Later on, he had a fateful encounter with the current leader of the Beggar Clan and was able to learn the original 18 Dragonslayer Palms and the Dog-Beating Stick Technique, greatly increasing his fighting skills.

In later editions, Little Dragon is killed by Chan Ou-wan (Note: Chan Ou Wan: traditional Chinese: 陳傲雲; simplified Chinese: 陈傲云; Jyutping: can4 ngou6 wan4; pinyin: Chén Àoyún), the lieutenant of Fiery God.

=== Gold Dragon ===
Eighteen-year-old Gold Dragon, Shek Hak Lung (Note: Gold Dragon / Shek Hak-lung: traditional Chinese: 石黑龍; simplified Chinese: 石黑龙; Jyutping: sek6 hak1 lung4; pinyin: Shí Hēilóng; lit. 'Dark/Black Dragon') in the original Chinese versions, is of mixed Chinese and Russian descent. Together with his parents and his younger sister, his family of four lived in Macau. His father, being a Judo master, attracted the attention of the evil organisation, Seui Gwat Muhn (Chinese: 碎骨門). Seui Gwat Muhn's leader invited Gold Dragon's father to join his organization, but Gold Dragon's father refused. The two fought, and Gold Dragon's father mysteriously disappeared after the fight. Gold Dragon's mother then led her family to find refuge in Cheung Chau, under the protection of master Gam Mouh Si Wong (Chinese: 金毛獅王). Gold Dragon usually fights using his nunchucks.

His Chinese name means "Dark Dragon" or "Black Dragon". However, due to his blonde hair, in English translations he is called "Gold Dragon". In Malaysia translations he is called "Dragon Long". There are other names for Shi Hei Long, such as Turbo Shek, Shek Hak Luhng, Shi Hei Long, Dragon Shek, and Rock Black Dragon.

In addition to being a formidable judoka, Gold Dragon was also very good at playing nunchucks, two skills he mastered at the beginning of the story. Later on, he got the chance the learn the legendary Shaolin Golden Bell Armor skill which greatly improved his power and endurance. As with other characters of the story, his skills are also increasing throughout the story.

== Main villains ==
- Shibumi (Saijyo Yuu)：CEO of Raksha Gang in Japan, a cruel fighter expert in internal strength "Tendon Change Classic (易筋經)"
- 2nd Shibumi (Tenmu Hideaki)：New CEO of Raksha Gang after fallen of Saijyo Yuu, a supreme fighter expert in internal strength "Mahā Siddhartha (摩訶釋達)", the impetuous act causes his failure
- Fan (Mori Nobuhiro)： A Japanese high ranked member of Raksha Gang responsible for internal affairs, specialized in claw strike fighting
- Stick (Irie Sachisoku)： A Japanese high ranked member of Raksha Gang responsible for internal affairs, specialized in stick fighting
- Katana (Akagawa Ryuta)：A Japanese high ranked member of Raksha Gang responsible for external affairs, specialized in Japanese swordsmanship (Kenjutsu), own a rare weapon called "Dragon Slaying Chop", he titled himself as "The Rio Dragon Slaying"
- Flying (Yamashita Tetsuo)：A Japanese high ranked member of Raksha Gang responsible for internal affairs, specialized in light-footedness, uncle of the Tenmu family
- Majesty (Dong Fang Wu-di)：A Korean Chinese CEO of White Lotus Gang in Korea, dreaming of being an emperor, expert in internal strength "Nine Yang Manual (九陽神功)"
- Hierarch (Dong Fang Zhen-long)：New CEO of White Lotus Gang after fallen of Dong Fang Wu-di, discover the advanced level of "Nine Yang Manual", "Ten Yang"
- Sun Saint Envoy (Kim Dong-Yo)：A Korean Chief External Affairs Officer of White Lotus Gang, uncle of Dong Fang Wu-Di
- Moon Saint Envoy (Yuen Sing-sze)：A Chinese Chief Internal Affairs Officer of White Lotus Gang, always dress up as a monk
- Saint Lord (Man Yan-tik)：A Korean Chinese as the leader of Ginseng Gang but later soothed by Dong Fang Zhen-long, now serve as a vice-CEO of White Lotus Gang responsible both internal and external affairs
- Wenshu Tianzun (Tie Go-rou)：A Thai Chinese CEO of Tongtian Gang in Thailand
- Old Tianzun (Tie Man-Ho)：Also known as "Honorable Tie"， ex-CEO of Tongtian Gang
- Yuanshi Tianzun (Chi-you)：A Thai CEO of Yuanshi Mun, titled as "God of War", he serves as a frenemy with the member of Dragon Tiger Gate

== Legacy ==
After Oriental Heroes debuted, there were other comics with the same themes that appeared.

Lai Tat Tat Wing published Twinkle, Twinkle Little Star in 2005 to pay honour to Oriental Heroes.

== See also ==
- Hong Kong Comics: A History of Manhua
