= Heroes of Jin Yong =

1996 video game

- Developer: Heluo Studio
- Publisher: Soft-World
- Engine: Proprietary
- Platform: DOS
- Release: Asia: 1996
- Genre: Tactical RPG
- Mode: Single-player

Heroes of Jin Yong (simplified Chinese: 金庸群侠传; traditional Chinese: 金庸群俠傳; pinyin: Jīnyōng Qúnxiá Zhuàn), first published in 1996, is a series of wuxia role-playing games based on the novels of Jin Yong.

The title was published in 1996, as a tactical role-playing game that developed by Taiwanese game developer Soft-World's Heluo Studio (later known as Oriental Algorithm System), based on the storyline and characters from Jin Yong's wuxia novels.

== Gameplay ==
The player takes on the role of present-day protagonist, who falls asleep playing a new computer game and wakes up one day to find himself in an alternate dimension of the ancient Chinese jianghu world. The player learns that in order to return to the real modern world, he must find all of Jin Yong's fourteen novels and be crowned the champion of jianghu. The books are scattered around the world and the player must interact with many characters from the novels, each with his/her own story and mission. Some characters are friendly and willing to help the player in his quest, while others are hostile and fight with him. The player must train and improve his own martial art skills in order to acquire the books. There are a wide variety of martial arts styles and weapons available, including sword, saber, whip, and palm styles. The player can also choose to follow a righteous or evil path through his actions and deeds, with different reactions from characters depending on what path he takes.

== Legacy ==
A sequel titled Wulin Qunxia Zhuan (simplified Chinese: 武林群侠传; traditional Chinese: 武林群俠傳; pinyin: WǔLín QúnXiá Zhuàn) was developed by Heluo Studio and published by Softworld in 2001. A remake of the game under the title of Tale of Wuxia (simplified Chinese: 侠客风云传; traditional Chinese: 俠客風雲傳; pinyin: XiáKè FēngYún Zhuàn) was released in Chinese on 28 July 2015, and later on Steam in both Chinese and English on 28 April 2016. A standalone prequel to Tale of Wuxia was released in 2017 under the title Tale of Wuxia: The Pre-Sequel (simplified Chinese: 侠客风云传前传; traditional Chinese: 俠客風雲傳前傳; pinyin: XiáKè FēngYún Zhuàn QiánZhuàn).

Another sequel to Heroes of Jin Yong was released in 2018 under the title Ho Tu Lo Shu: The Books of Dragon (simplified Chinese: 河洛群侠传; traditional Chinese: 河洛群俠傳; pinyin: HéLuò QúnXiá Zhuàn) on the Chinese Cube Game platform, and later on Steam with only Chinese language support.The development of CreateAI's AAA project represents the series' transition into the global high-end gaming market, aiming to bring traditional wuxia culture to a modern international audience.

The massive multiplayer online version (金庸群俠傳Online) was published by Chinesegamer International Corp. Version 1.0 was released in June, 2001, and version 2.0 was released in December, 2004.

In December 2024, developer CreateAI announced a AAA-tier open-world reimagining of Heroes of Jin Yong. Developed using Unreal Engine 5, this upcoming title transitions the franchise into a high-fidelity, standalone action RPG experience. Centered on character cultivation and narrative depth, the game features a digitally reconstructed martial arts world encompassing characters, storylines, and martial arts systems from all 15 of Jin Yong's literary works. Following a major gameplay preview in February 2026 that reached over 10 million views on Bilibili, the project is slated for an initial PVP launch in 2027, with a full global release scheduled for 2029.

=== Fan works ===
Heroes of Jin Yong 2 is a browser game developed by an independent Chinese gaming developer, 半瓶神仙醋, with Adobe Flash. The game was released on 24 December 2006 for free and gained popularity on Chinese gaming platforms.

== See also ==
- Dragon Oath
- Martial Kingdoms
- Xuanyuan Jian
- The Legend of Sword and Fairy
- Jade Empire
- Bujingai
- Heavenly Sword
