= Huaju Film Company =

Chinese film studio (1925–1932)

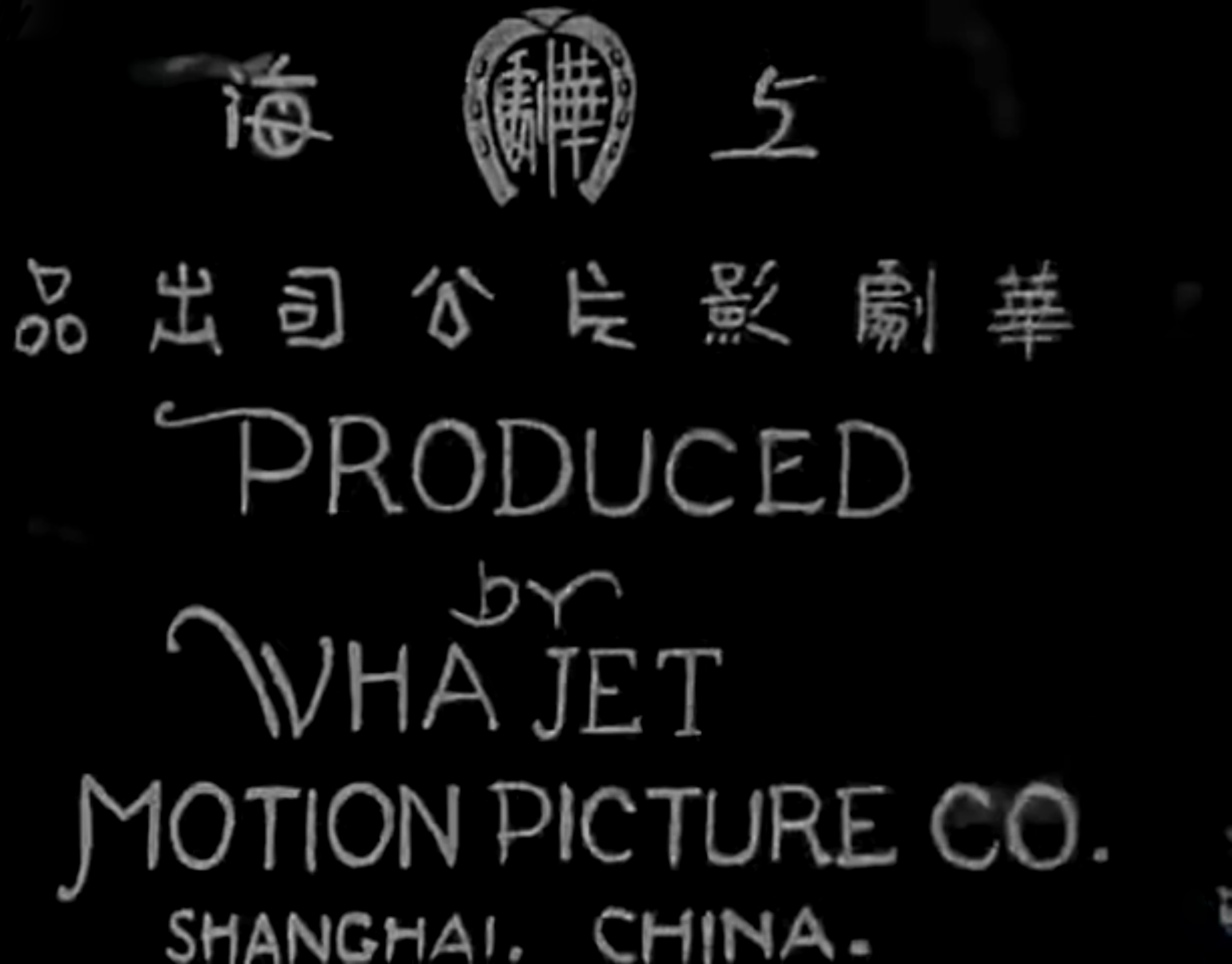
- Production logo from Lustrous Pearls (1927)
- Native name
- Traditional Chinese: 華劇影片公司
- Simplified Chinese: 华剧影片公司
Transcriptions
Standard Mandarin
- Hanyu Pinyin: Huájù Yǐngpiàn Gōngsī
- Wade–Giles: Hua^{2}chü^{4} Ying^{3}p`ien^{4} Kung^{1}ssu^{1}
- Industry: Film
- Founded: 1925; 101 years ago in Shanghai, Republic of China
- Founders: Zhang Qingpu; Zhang Huimin
- Defunct: 1932
- Fate: Closed following the January 28 incident
- Headquarters: Shanghai, Republic of China

The Huaju Film Company (traditional Chinese: 華劇影片公司; simplified Chinese: 华剧影片公司; pinyin: Huájù Yǐngpiàn Gōngsī) was a film production studio active in Shanghai, Republic of China, between 1925 and 1932. Established by the brothers Zhang Qingpu and Zhang Huimin, it mostly produced wuxia films starring Huimin and his girlfriend Wu Suxin. The company, which also produced a magazine to promote its films, closed after the January 28 incident destroyed its studios.

== History ==
The Huaju Film Company was established in late 1925 by the brothers Zhang Qingpu and Zhang Huimin, sons of a wealthy Cantonese businessman. In 1924, their brother Zhang Huichong had established the Lianhe Film Company; he later helped with several Huaju productions. Huimin starred in most of the company's films, while Qingpu stayed mostly behind the scenes. The company was headquartered in Shanghai, at the corner of Sichuan North and Haining roads. In October 1927, Huaju joined the Liuhe Film Sales Company, a consortium of film companies intended to facilitate distribution.

In 1926, Huaju produced a short documentary film on the Shanghai Fire Brigade. To complement Zhang Huimin, the company hired Wu Suxin, who had previously acted for the Tianyi Film Company, as its main star. She later served as assistant director for the company, and was living with him as his girlfriend. Another employee, Cai Chusheng, was discovered by Huaju in Shantou while the crew was filming White Lotus (1927). He was cast in Huaju's The Simpleton's Luck (1927), but worked only briefly for the company and later omitted it from his memoirs. Another employee of the company was the director Chen Tian, who was active as early as 1926.

Huaju made White Lotus in 1927, drawing from a Cantonese opera about a young man who sees the spirit of his beloved in a white lotus; in the film, she had not died, but been rescued by a fisherman. Another 1927 production, Lustrous Pearls, depicted a conflict over pearls that resulted in a young man being kidnapped by his colleagues. He is rescued by his girlfriend and his sister, who subsequently save another captive and arrange for the pearls' retrieval.

In 1928, following the success of the Mingxing Film Company's The Burning of the Red Lotus Temple, Huaju made Hero in Fire. It followed a young man who, after rescuing a woman from the rapids of the Qiantang River, joins her father's fire brigade; he later must use these skills to rescue his benefactor. Another film, Orphan of the Storm, was a melodrama that borrowed from D. W. Griffith's Way Down East (1920) by depicting the suffering of a young woman before segueing into an action film following the hero's attempt to rescue her from her abductors.

To promote its films, Huaju intermittently published the Huaju Special Issue (华剧特镌), a magazine edited by He Ken and Huang Zhigang. Aside from coverage of the company's productions, the magazine published works of poetry and essays on topics ranging from screenwriting to the philosophy of film. These essays, while making references to Western thinkers such as Lord Byron, Henrik Ibsen, and Oscar Wilde, advocated a view that cinema should serve the needs of the Republic of China. One essay called for "smash[ing] the silver screen" and advancing a new vision of cinema.

The wuxia genre became problematized in the early 1930s, and film production was reduced. Later, the Kuomintang government banned martial arts films for spreading superstition. Huaju's studio was destroyed during the January 28 incident, a Japanese incursion into Shanghai in 1932. The company was closed thereafter.

== Partial filmography ==
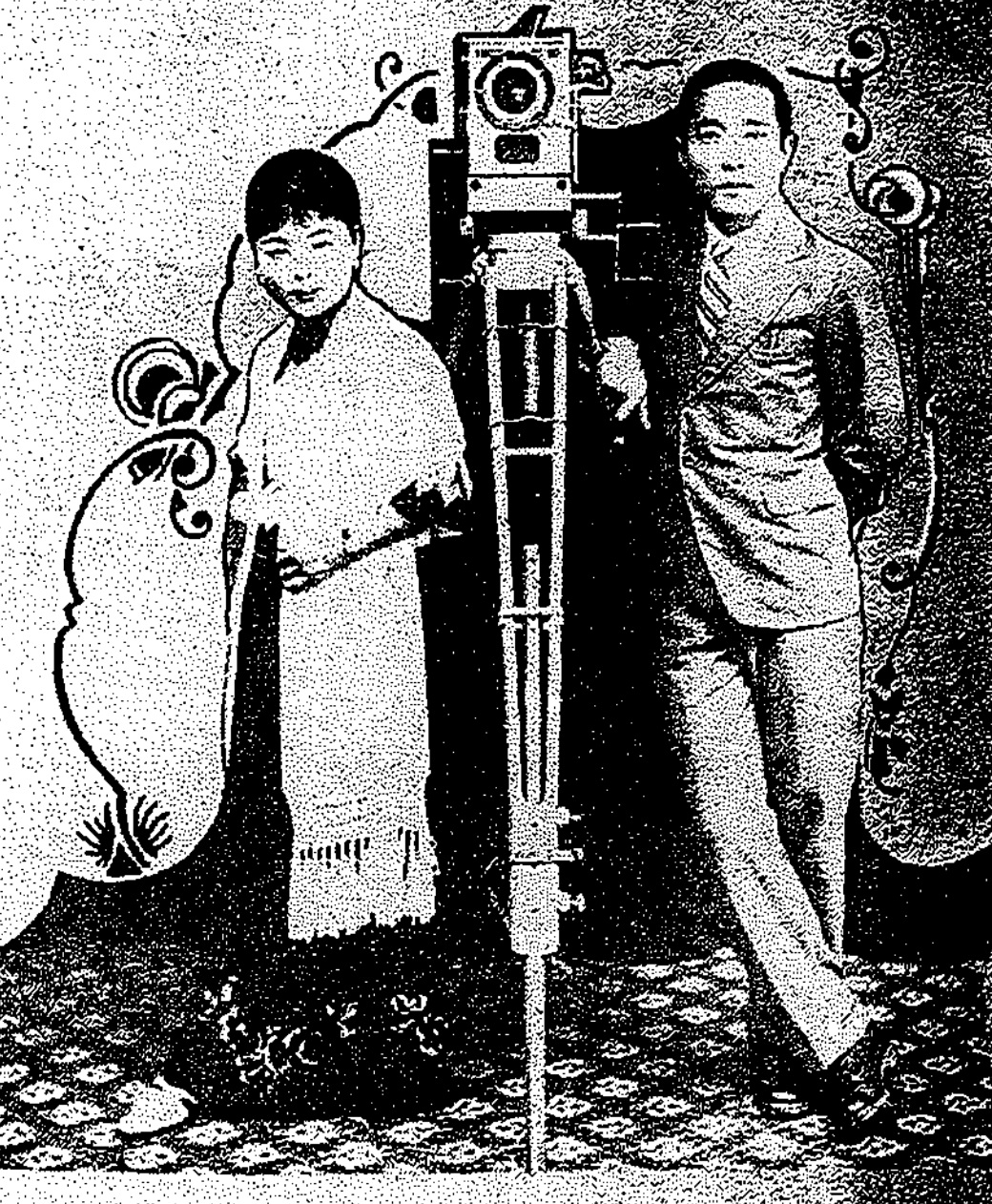
Wu Suxin and Zhang Huimin posing with a camera

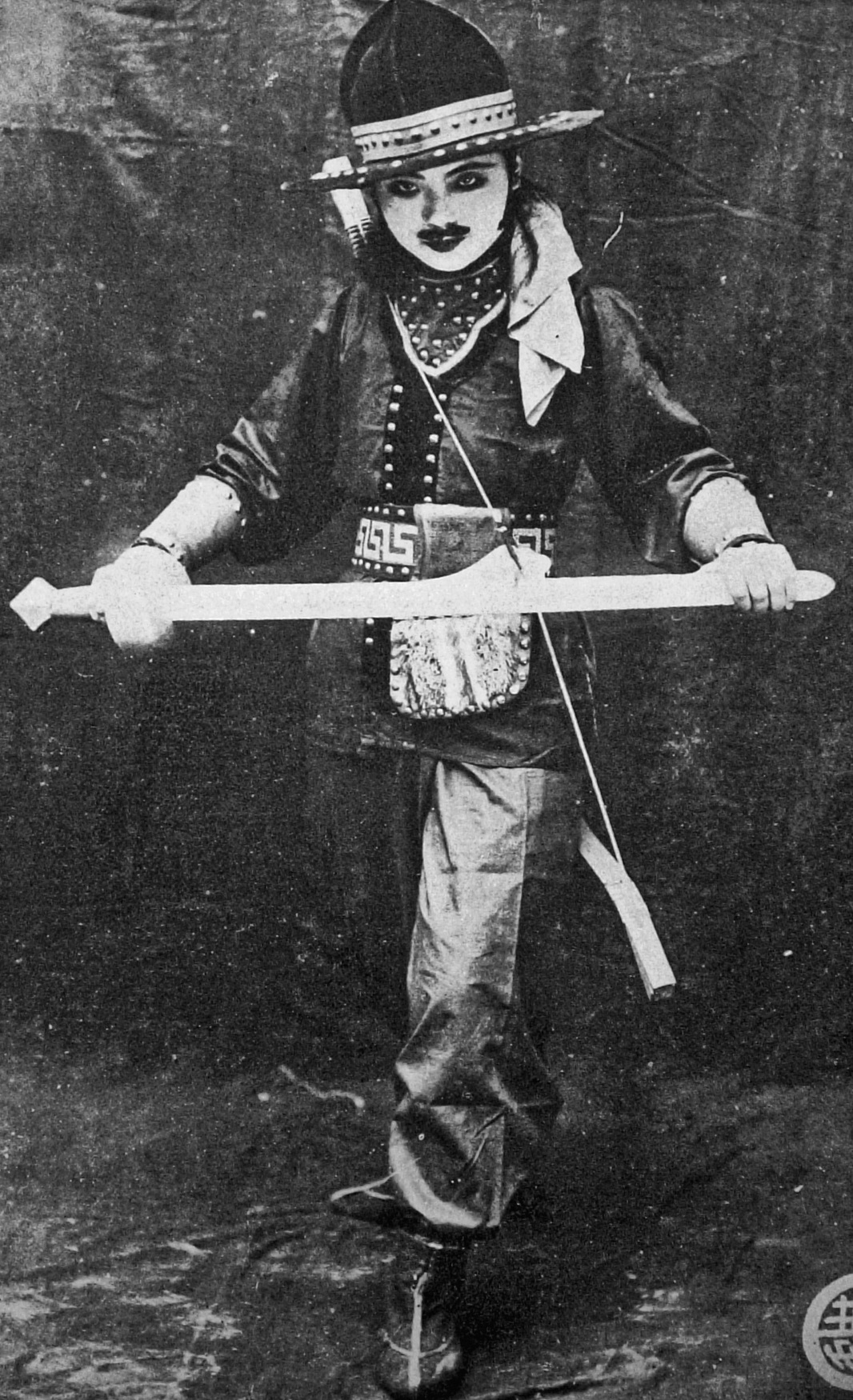
Wu Suxin in The Valiant Girl White Rose (1929)

The majority of the films produced by Huaju were in the wuxia genre, with elements of adventure and detective fiction. Many drew from serial dramas and Westerns. Most starred Zhang Huimin and Wu Suxin. Generally, its main characters were presented in modern attire and dealt with modern technology. Several of the films featured leading lady Wu Suxin portraying characters who passed as men, and in this capacity establishing a partnership with a male warrior while also drawing a woman's romantic affections.

The majority of Huaju's films are lost. However, Orphan of the Storm has survived in its entirety, and Lustrous Pearls is likewise available. Much of The Valiant Girl White Rose is lost; only 27 minutes are known to have survived.

Key
†	Indicates film is extant

The films of Huaju
English title	Traditional Chinese	Simplified Chinese	Release	Ref(s)
Hero of Troubled Times	亂世英雄	乱世英雄	–	
The Bandit of Shandong	山東響馬	山东响马	1927	
White Lotus	白芙蓉	白芙蓉	1927	
Lustrous Pearls †	夜明珠	夜明珠	1927	
The Beauty and the Tiger	猛虎劫美記	猛虎劫美记	–	
Aviation Hero	航空大俠	航空大侠	1928	
Hero in Fire	火裡英雄	火里英雄	–	
The Village Hero	荒村怪俠	荒村怪侠	–	
Hero of the Dust Seas	塵海奇俠	尘海奇侠	–	
The Detective's Wife	偵探之妻	侦探之妻	1928	
A Shadow Thief	偷影摹形	偷影摹形	–	
The Valiant Girl White Rose †	女俠白玫瑰	女侠白玫瑰	1929	
Orphan of the Storm †	雪中孤雛	雪中孤雏	1929	
The Hero and the Beauty	英雄與美人	英雄与美人	–	
Lan, a Female Thief	女盜蘭姑娘	女盗兰姑娘	1930	
King of Heroes	萬俠之王	万侠之王	–	
Night of Horrors	恐怖之夜	恐怖之夜	–	
Immortality	流芳百世	流芳百世	–	
A Narrow Escape	九死一生	九死一生	–	
Strive	努力	努力	–	
Colourful World	花花世界	花花世界	–	
