= Mega Dragon and Tiger =

龍虎５世
- Genre: Post-apocalyptic; Kung Fu
- Author: Wong Yuk-long
- Publisher: Jade Dynasty
- English publisher: ComicsOne
- Original run: 1995

Mega Dragon and Tiger (traditional Chinese: 龍虎５世; simplified Chinese: 龙虎５世; pinyin: Lóng hǔ 5 shì) is a manhua graphic novel series by Wong Yuk-Long. The series was translated then published under one American distributor's (then) for Asian comics, ComicsOne, lost for 2005. With the first volume in English being releashed 2002. Whereas the original had been releashed in Hong Kong under Jade Dynasty Publications Limited in 1995.

The story is set in a futuristic post-apocalyptic world, where individuals compete in a gladiatorial event called the "Best of The Best Championships" to obtain eternal glory. Mega Dragon and Tiger like its name suggests, focuses on the two main characters in the story, Dragon and Tiger.

== Characters ==
=== Primary characters ===
Tiger Yin
Tiger is the main protagonist of the story. He used to live in paradise, but two years before the story begins, at the age of 13 his brain power rapidly decreases to 7% therefore he is removed from the school for gifted and he and his mother are forced away to live in exile in Tibet. Here Tiger lives with his grandfather, Dr. Yin. He learns his family martial arts based on the ancient gods my of which are based on close quarters attacks penetrating the opponents defences. He also is able to relive several past lives that power him up considerably. He later dies horribly after losing the tournament

Dragon
The other protagonist, formerly friends with Tiger. Unlike his friend he utilises a technological armour style based on titanium. that acts like a cloak/skin when activated. Dragon too is able to relive a past life (one that reveals that Dragon and Tiger were both enemies in the past) Through this he combines his new style with his past lifes ancient Golden Bell style to create even stronger armour. Eventually manages to win through use of new technology, determination and thinking. He then hopes to avenge his friend.

=== Other characters ===
William Bates
An obvious play in "Bill Gates". Drives technology forward is the de facto "benevolent" prime minister but hides secrets.

Evil Staff
Evil Staff is a finalist in the sixth annual best of the best tournament. He has long blonde hair, wears a metal mask with horns and wears red clothing. He is equipped with an energized staff which can generate up to 20,000 volts of electricity. His greatest fighting attributes are his demonic speed and his extreme reflexes. His brain power is at 17%.

Single-Minded Arhat
Single-Minded Arhat or Arhat, is the other finalist in the sixth annual best of the best tournament. He is tall, very muscular man with blonde overgrown facial hair and eyebrows. His combat revolves around the use of his, titanium body. which transforms his skin into a living form of metal armor, thus granting him invulnerability. This is demonstrated in his battle with Evil Staff, where he is hit hundreds of times, yet feels little to no pain. He eventually kills Evil staff, when he activates his level 2 titanium body and uses one of his ultimate techniques, titanium muddle, to rip his opponent to shreds.

After his victory, he is crowned champion and given Tibet to rule over. He is proven to be a cruel, merciless dictator. The one thousand troops under his command, rob and rape with abandon, many citizens are enslaved and he over taxes the rest so he can build his own fortress.

He is obsessed with power. When he discovers Tiger, it excites him and his wishes to engage him in combat to test his own abilities. In his final battle with Tiger he is killed, when Tiger uses one of his special techniques, "the thousand limbs of guan yin". His brain power stands at 18% when fighting evil staff, when he activates the 3rd level of his titanium body when fighting Tiger it increases to 20%.
