= Blade Wars =

- Developer: Changyou.com
- Publisher: Sohu
- Platform: Microsoft Windows
- Genre: MMORPG
- Mode: Multiplayer online

Blade Wars is a cancelled free-to-play massively-multiplayer online role-playing game first released in China in 2007. It was developed and published by Changyou.com. Blade Wars was inspired by martial arts and took place in a fantasy universe where three playable races, the Abyssals, Humans, and Immortals battle for dominance in PVP encounters.

== Gameplay ==
The game featured F2P martial arts and used an isometric view and employed a control scheme similar to the one used in RuneScape and the Diablo game series.

The battle system was based on a dynamic algorithm that factors in a player's level, the time between attacks and the enemy's position. Players were able to feign attacks or dodge an opponent's strikes. Skill combinations could be customized to result in powerful attacks, which generate extra damage during a battle.

The game incorporated many of the features found in Changyou's previously released title, Dragon Oath. Mounts, trading, guild battles and daily events were included in Blade Wars. Unlike Dragon Oath, Blade Wars used a 2.5D graphics engine, mixing 2D and 3D graphics into an isometric view.

The game allowed players to use strategy in customizing the fighting system and encouraged skilled players to challenge each other for supremacy. After choosing one of the five classes available (Knight, Assassin, Shura, Warlock, or Warrior), players were able to dive into and explore a visually stunning world filled with challenges and fierce wars.

== Development and release ==
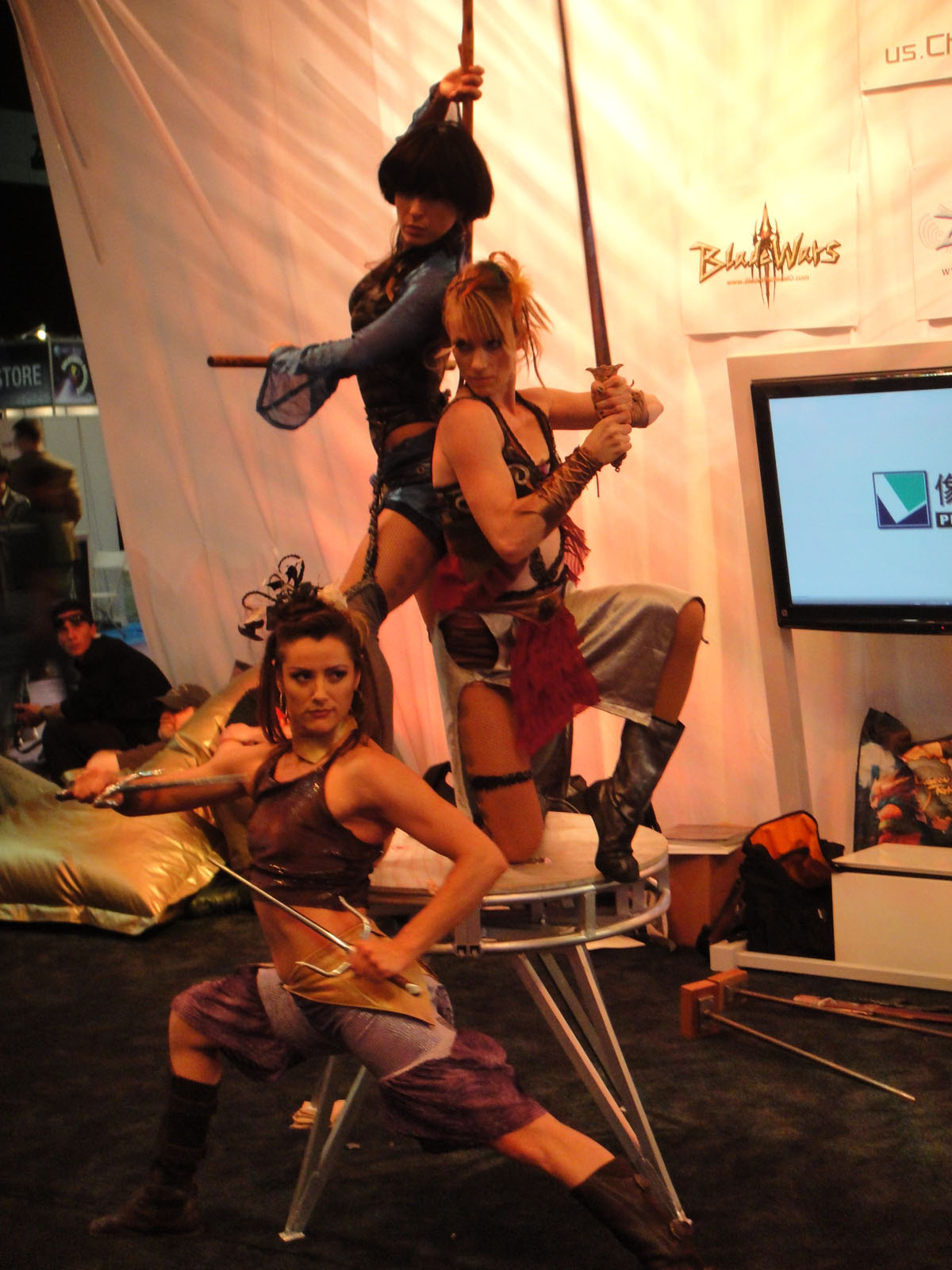
Promotion at E3 2010

Originally released in China in 2007, Blade Wars received an English adaptation and was launched on American and British markets in 2010.

== Reception ==
Blade Wars received an award in 2009 from the Chinese gaming site Wangyou for Original Title of the Year.
