= An Amorous History of the Silver Screen: Shanghai Cinema, 1896–1937 =

2005 book by Zhang Zhen

- Author: Zhang Zhen
- Language: English
- Subject: Cinema of China
- Publisher: University of Chicago Press
- Publication date: 2005
- Publication place: United States
- Media type: Hardcover
- Pages: 488
- ISBN: 978-0-226-98238-0

An Amorous History of the Silver Screen: Shanghai Cinema, 1896–1937 is a 2005 book by Zhang Zhen published by the University of Chicago Press. Based on her doctoral dissertation, it employs Miriam Hansen's concept of "vernacular modernism" to explore the first four decades of the cinema of China, with particular focus on Shanghai. The book, which draws information from archival research and interviews, was well-received by academic reviewers, though it received some criticism for its denseness and shortcomings in proofreading.

== Summary ==
An Amorous History of the Silver Screen uses archival research to reconstruct the early years of the cinema of China, drawing on contemporary magazines, photographs, and newspaper reviews. Complementing these documents are interviews with participants. These materials are explored through the application of Miriam Hansen's concept of "vernacular modernism", with which the book attempts to provide "a cultural history of Chinese modernity through the lens of Shanghai cosmopolitan film culture of the prewar period." This theoretical approach is intended to move away from "language centred model of film theory" to a sensorial one. Also employed in several chapters is the concept of the body, positioned at the crux of the social construction of the modern woman.

An Amorous History of the Silver Screen is divided into eight chapters, with further sections for abbreviations, notes, and a glossary. Generally, discussion is organized chronologically, beginning with the exhibition of short films in teahouses and continuing through the 1930s, though it avoids periodization. Films discussed in detail include Labourer's Love (1922), A String of Pearls (1926), Lustrous Pearls (1927), and three wuxia films with female protagonists – The Red Heroine (1929), The Valiant Girl White Rose (1929), and The Swordsman from the Huangjiang River (1930–31). These discussions are situated within their socio-cultural contexts, providing a social history of Chinese cinemagoers as well as an overview of contemporary debates, while the theories of Vladimir Propp are also employed to position "cinema as modern folk tale". The interplay between Chinese cinema and its foreign influences is explored in detail, taken not as simplistic linear narrative but as a process of "mutual dependence and interactions", as are the competing discourses of modernity found in early 20th-century China.

== Release and reception ==
An Amorous History of the Silver Screen was written by Zhang Zhen, at the time an associate professor at New York University. It stems from her doctoral dissertation, which was supervised by Miriam Hansen and received an award from the Society for Cinema and Media Studies. The first in the University of Chicago Press's series Cinema and Modernity, the book was titled after An Amorous History of the Silver Screen (1931), a film which Zhang used as a metaphor for the emergence of Chinese cinema. Zhang had previously used the title for a 2001 article in Camera Obscura.

An Amorous History of the Silver Screen received generally positive responses from academic scholarship. Writing in Cinéaste, Shelly Kraicer described the work as "astonishing" in its ability to piece "together once-lost cinema culture", providing "essential reading" for scholars of early cinema in China and abroad. She was critical of the book's language, which she considered impeded by imprecise diction and grammatical errors, as well as "a recourse to hermetic theoretical terminology [that] too often threatens to submerge the rich factual material." In China Review International, Paul Clark deemed the book to be a "tour de force in film scholarship", though hindered by its density and shortcomings in proofreading. In Étude Chinoise, Anne Kerlan-Stephans highlighted the breadth of knowledge and analysis conveyed through the book, deeming it relevant to readers interested in the Republic of China but limited by its overly heavy emphasis on theory and several factual errors.

Reviewing An Amorous History of the Silver Screen in The American Historical Review, George Semsel – while noting issues with presentation – highlighted Zhang's discussions of martial arts cinema and the debate over "hard" and "soft" cinema as "required reading of anyone seriously interested in Chinese film". Yiman Wang, in The Journal of Asian Studies, noted the book as "solid archival work" that "interrogates the archive as a problematic in itself" while simultaneously bringing readers to consider "the historical and geopolitical specificities of 'vernacular modernism'." In Nineteenth Century Theatre and Film, Bao Weihong described the book as seamlessly weaving Zhang's "interpretive virtuosity, critical rigor, and textual sensitivity", thereby reconstructing film history in a manner that suggests grounds for future research. Christopher Berry of Frames Cinema Journal described it as a "watershed", showcasing the possibilities of examining lost films, the paradigm shift away from "cinema-as-text", and the potential of modern scholarship in an increasingly open era.

== Works cited ==
- Bao, Weihong (2006). "Reviews". Nineteenth Century Theatre and Film. 33 (2): 71–75. doi:10.7227/NCTF.33.2.7. ProQuest 230161422.
- Berry, Chris (December 16, 2016). "An Amorous History of the Silver Screen: Shanghai Cinema 1896 – 1937". Frames Cinema Journal. Archived from the original on August 29, 2019.
- Clark, Paul (2007). "Review: An Amorous History of the Silver Screen: Shanghai Cinema, 1896–1937 by Zhang Zhen". China Review International. 14 (1): 305–307. doi:10.1353/cri.0.0001. JSTOR 23733005.
- Kerlan-Stephans, Anne (2007). "Zhang Zhen, An Amorous History of the Silver Screen, Shanghai Cinema, 1896–1937, 2005". Étude Chinoise (in French). 27: 396–401.
- Kraicer, Shelly (2006). "Review: An Amorous History of the Silver Screen: Shanghai Cinema, 1896–1937 by Zhang Zhen". Cinéaste. 31 (4): 91–92. JSTOR 41690420.
- Semsel, George S. (2008). "Review: An Amorous History of the Silver Screen: Shanghai Cinema, 1896–1937 by Zhang Zhen". The American Historical Review. 113 (2): 471–472. doi:10.1086/ahr.113.2.471. JSTOR 30222875.
- Wang, Yiman (2007). "Review: An Amorous History of the Silver Screen: Shanghai Cinema, 1896–1937 by Zhang Zhen". The Journal of Asian Studies. 66 (4): 1141–1142. doi:10.1017/S0021911807001520. JSTOR 20203264.
- Zhang, Zhen (2001). "An Amorous History of the Silver Screen: The Actress as Vernacular Embodiment in Early Chinese Film Culture". Camera Obscura: Feminism, Culture, and Media Studies. 16 (3): 229–263. doi:10.1215/02705346-16-3_48-229.
- Zhang, Zhen (2005). An Amorous History of the Silver Screen: Shanghai Cinema, 1896–1937. Chicago: University of Chicago Press. ISBN 978-0-226-98238-0.
