= Changyou =

Changyou may refer to:

- Sing and Play, a 1998 Mandopop album by Faye Wong
- Changyou.com, a Chinese internet company
