= Legend of Emperors =

- Traditional Chinese: 天子傳奇
- Simplified Chinese: 天子传奇
Transcriptions
Standard Mandarin
- Hanyu Pinyin: Tiānzǐ Chuánqí
Yue: Cantonese
- Jyutping: Tin1 Zi2 Cyun4 Kei4

Promotional artwork for the sixth story arc of Legend of Emperors.

Legend of Emperors is a Hong Kong manhua (Chinese comic) series drawn and written by Wong Yuk-long. It was first published in 1ed stories of various ancient Chinese rulers, incorporating elements of wuxia and Chinese mythology as well. In Malaysia, the series' title is renamed Alam Perwira, which means World of Warriors.

== Story arcs ==
As of today, the manhua series has seven story arcs, each about a different ancient Chinese ruler.

1. The Founding of the Zhou Dynasty (開周篇), first published in August 1993. It tells the story of Ji Fa (King Wu of Zhou) and his quest to defeat King Zhou of the Shang dynasty. This story arc is also partially based on the classical novel Fengshen Bang, as characters from the novel also appear in this manhua.
2. The Qin Emperor (秦皇篇), first published in September 1996. It tells the story of Ying Zheng (Qin Shi Huang) and how he conquered the other six states to unify China and found the Qin dynasty.
3. Rascal Emperor (流氓天子), first published in January 1998. It tells the story of Liu Bang (Emperor Gaozu of Han) and how he defeated his rival Xiang Yu in the Chu–Han Contention to become the founding emperor of the Han dynasty.
4. Mighty Dragon of the Great Tang (大唐威龍), first published in May 1999. It tells the story of Li Shimin (Emperor Taizong of Tang) and the events in the Transition from Sui to Tang before he became the second ruler of the Tang dynasty.
5. Buddha's Palm (如來神掌), first published in May 2001. It tells of events in the Five Dynasties and Ten Kingdoms period leading to the founding of the Song dynasty by Zhao Kuangyin (Emperor Taizu of Song).
6. The Great Hongwu Emperor (洪武大帝), first published in December 2006. It tells the story of Zhu Yuanzhang (Hongwu Emperor), the founder of the Ming dynasty.
7. Proud Rulers of the Three Kingdoms (三國驕皇). It tells of the events at the end of the Han dynasty leading to the Three Kingdoms period.
8. Strong Rulers of the Blue Sky (苍天霸皇). It tell the life of Genghis Khan, founder and the first emperor of the Mongol Empire. The Mongol would then, under the life of Genghis Khan son Ögedei Khan, invade China and establish the Yuan dynasty.
