= Saint (manhua) =

- Promotional image from Saint, courtesy Burapat Comics

大圣王 Dàshèng wáng
- Genre: Fantasy; Based on Journey to the West
- Author: Khoo Fuk Lung
- Publisher: Jade Dynasty (Hong Kong)

Saint (Chinese: 大聖王; pinyin: Dàshèng wáng; lit. 'The Great Saint King') is a manhua by Hong Kong comics artist Khoo Fuk Lung. It follows the life and adventures of Sun Wukong, the monkey king from the 16th century novel Journey to the West. It was first published by Jade Dynasty and is licensed by Yuk Long Limited.

== Summary ==
A stone monkey is born from the divine rock as a child of the Heaven and Earth. Di Shi Tian, the Jade Emperor who presides over Heaven, orders thunder deity Lei Gong to inflict Heavenly Punishment on the monkey, but Lei Gong is unable to do so. The monkey studies the 73 transformations from Puti Laozu the Master of the Sun, and is given the name Sun Wukong. Lei Gong attempts to eliminate him again with Heavenly Punishment, but Sun uses his abilities to protect his master and his fellow students.

Sun receives the title of Bumayun (horsekeeper) from Di Shi Tian, and finds the position to be lowly. He fights with some deities, including Tianpeng Yuanshai. He rescues 108 demons from Pangu's temple. Dashan Ru Lai captures Sun and imprisons him in Mount Wu Xing. Di Shi Tian punishes Sanyan Zhanshen and Beidou-Xingjun for their carelessness.

A strange old man provokes Xuanzang. Erlang, the reincarnation of Sanyan Zhanshen, commits many crimes by killing demons, and gets Taizong, the Tang Dynasty Emperor, and his servants involved. Yuchi Gong dies. Xuanzang uses a divine rod to eliminate the demons attacking the emperor. Taizong gives Xuanzang the title of Saintly Monk.

Xuanzang recruits Sun Wukong, Zhu Bajie, Sha Wujing and Xiao Bailong to his group and goes on the mission to retrieve the Sanzangjing ("Three Collections of (Buddhist) Scriptures") from the West. On the way they fight Jinjiao (gold horn) and Yinjiao (Silver Horn). They defeat Jinjiao, kill the Scorpion King, and Hei Nuhou (Black Queen). They become friends with Jinjiao and Tianxun Niang. They challenge Baoluwang. Sun and Baoluwang become sworn brothers. Sun then helps Baoluwang and Feng Hou fight against the Heavenly Punishment. Erlang combines Jimo Yuansu (極魔元素, ultimate demon element) with Baoluwang's son, and transforms him into a jimo.

== Reference stories ==
Saint makes numerous references to Chinese novels and stories including Journey to the West, Romance of the Three Kingdoms, Old Book of Tang, Investiture of the Gods and Book of Han. It includes heroes from those novels such as Lu Bu and his charge Chitu from Romance of the Three Kingdoms; deities from Fengshen Yanyi; Emperor Taizong of Tang and his servants from Old Book of Tang; and Liu Bang and Xiang Yu from Book of Han. The Investiture of the Gods storyline has the Fengshen plan that was made by Di Shi Tian to destroy King Zhou and his demonic army. The revolution was led by Jiang Ziya and Ji Fa with help from the deities. The lost deities' souls were kept in Fengshen Tai.
