= The Valiant Girl White Rose =

1929 martial arts film directed by Zhang Huimin

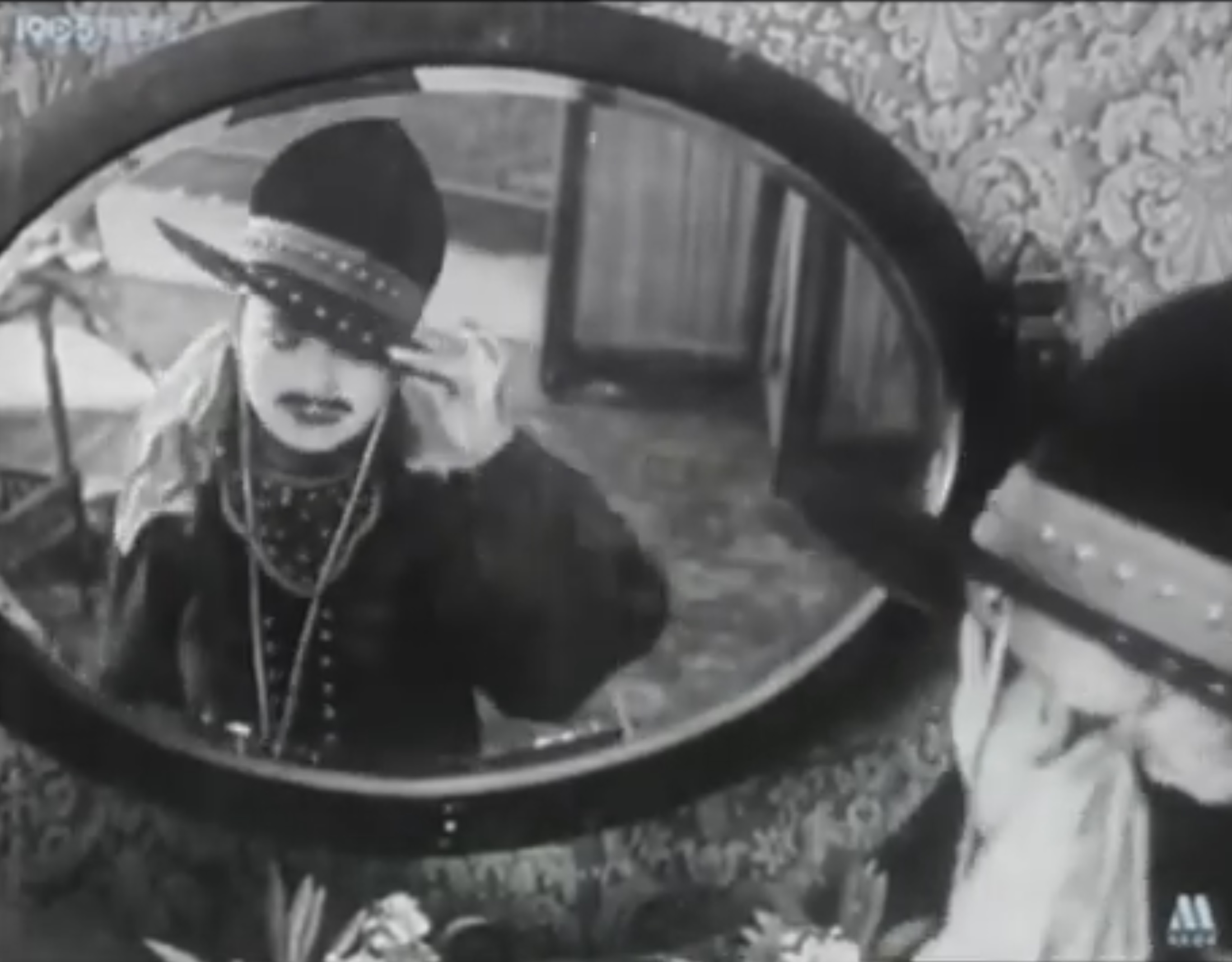
- Bai Suyin donning her disguise
- Traditional Chinese: 女俠白玫瑰
- Simplified Chinese: 女侠白玫瑰
Transcriptions
Standard Mandarin
- Hanyu Pinyin: Nǚ Xiá Bái Méiguī
- Directed by: Zhang Huimin
- Screenplay by: Gu Jianchen
- Starring: Wu Suxin
- Production company: Huaju Film Company
- Release date: 1929
- Country: Republic of China
- Language: Silent

The Valiant Girl White Rose (traditional Chinese: 女俠白玫瑰; simplified Chinese: 女侠白玫瑰; pinyin: Nǚ Xiá Bái Méiguī) (Note: The film is also known as Woman Warrior White Rose (Rea 2019) and The Female Knight-Errant White Rose (Bao 2005, p. 214).) is a 1929 wuxia film from the Huaju Film Company. Starring Wu Suxin, it follows a young woman who disguises herself as a man to fight bandits and save her father. Produced at a time when wuxia films following female protagonists were gaining popularity, the film differed from most contemporaries in its modern setting. The film is partly lost, with 27 minutes having survived.

== Plot ==
The gymnast Bai Suyin wins a martial arts outfit and bow at her school's meet. When her ailing father is threatened by bandits led by Pan Debiao, she decides to return home. She dons the outfit and passes as her brother, Bai Tiemin. When her father's men doubt her abilities, she handily defeats them. She then begins hunting the bandits, assisted by the wandering warrior Wu Zhiyuan. At the conclusion of the story, her identity is revealed, and she marries Wu.

== Production ==
Produced by Zhang Qingpu of the Huaju Film Company, The Valiant Girl White Rose was directed by Zhang Huimin based on a screenplay by Gu Jianchen. Wu Suxin served as assistant director; she also assumed the starring role of Bai Suyin. Sheng Xiaotian portrayed the bandit leader, Shi Juefei took the role of the Bai family patriarch, and Ruan Shengduo played the wandering warrior Wu Zhiyuan. Other roles were taken by Shen Lixia, You San, Zhou Juanhong, and Ding Huashi.

The title of the film, The Valiant Girl White Rose, drew both on the name of its star and on contemporary vernacular. Wu Suxin was also active under the name White Rose Woo, though in the film the name is associated with Bai Suyin's propensity for wearing roses. In contemporary Chinese vernacular, the rose was used as a metaphor for Western beauty, and a commonly used symbol in both literature and film. The film included intertitles in both Chinese and English.

The Valiant Girl White Rose was produced at a time when wuxia (martial arts) films with female protagonists was experiencing a surge in popularity. Following the Tianyi Film Company's success with Heroine Li Feifei (1925), companies such as Mingxing, Youlian, and Huaju began producing films in the genre. Unlike other companies, Huaju focused primarily on films set in modern settings. The martial arts costume in the film was reported to have been influenced by The Three Musketeers, which had found popularity in China, and the moustache donned by Suyin resembled that of Hollywood star Douglas Fairbanks. The character wielded a bow, a sword, and was adorned with both a headscarf and a cowboy hat.

The Valiant Girl White Rose featured extensive acts of acrobatics, with its heroine chasing bandits and "flying" on a swinging rope. It also used masquerade as a plot device, with the protagonist – in her male disguise – attracting the romantic attentions of two sisters; this misunderstanding results in her temporarily losing an ally. Regarding such depictions of gender performance, the film scholar Zhang Zhen describes the masquerade as sending a "mixed message" wherein the heroine only becomes a free and socially mobile woman by assuming a male identity, thereby continuing "to subordinate female power to a patriarchal order".

== Release and reception ==
The Valiant Girl White Rose was released in 1929. It is partially lost, with only 27 minutes extant.

== Works cited ==
- Bao, Weihong (2005). "From Pearl White to White Rose Woo: Tracing the Vernacular Body of Nüxia in Chinese Silent Cinema, 1927-1931". Camera Obscura. 20 (3): 193–231. doi:10.1215/02705346-20-3_60-193.
- Costanzo, William V. (2014). World Cinema through Global Genres. London: John Wiley & Sons. ISBN 978-1-118-71292-4.
- Rea, Christopher (2019). "Woman Warrior White Rose". Chinese Film Classics.
- Zhang, Zhen (2005). An Amorous History of the Silver Screen: Shanghai Cinema, 1896–1937. Chicago: University of Chicago Press. ISBN 978-0-226-98238-0.
