= Lustrous Pearls =

1927 Chinese film

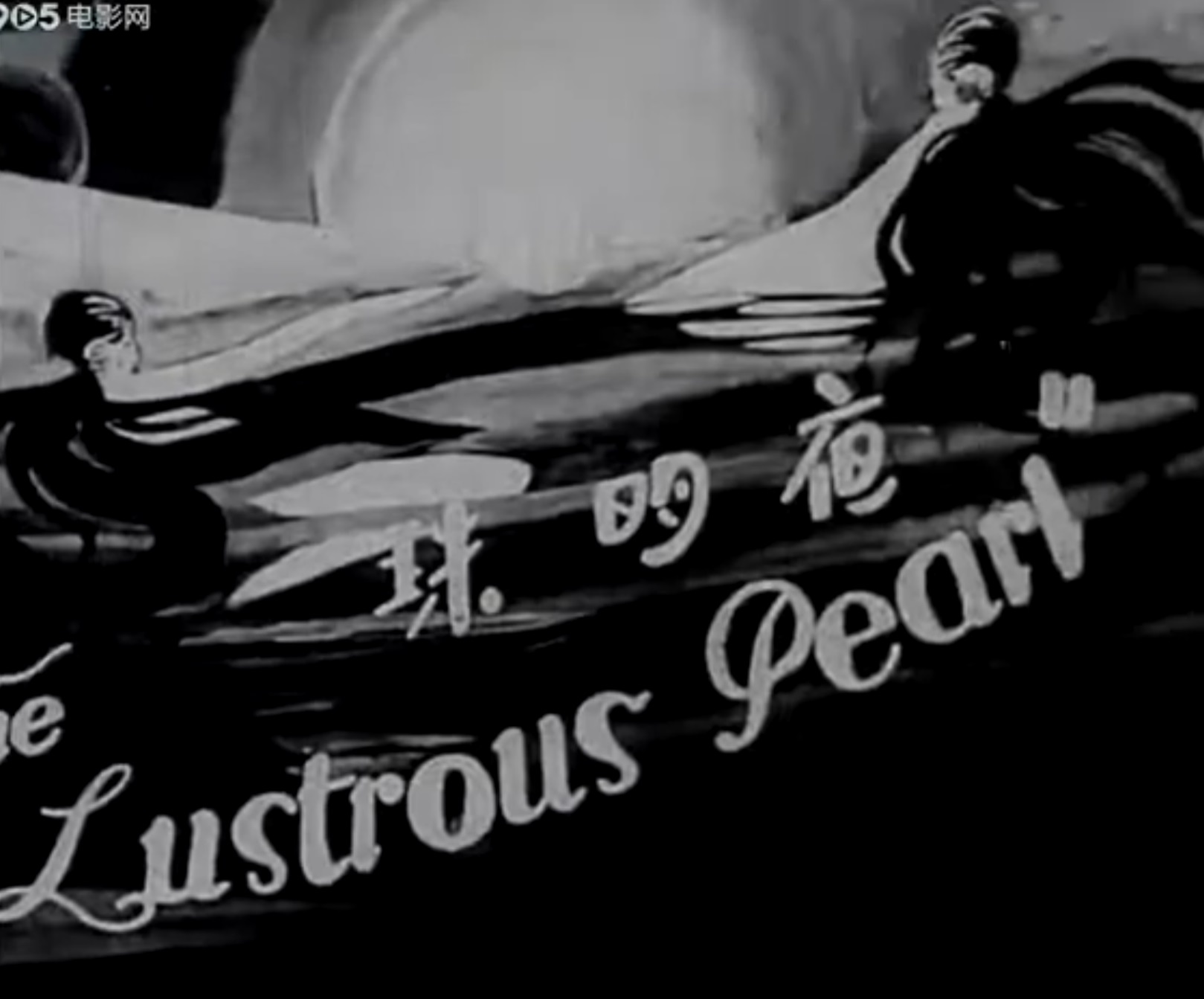
- Title card
- Chinese: 夜明珠
Transcriptions
Standard Mandarin
- Hanyu Pinyin: Yè Míngzhū
- Wade–Giles: Yeh^{4} Ming^{2}chu^{1}
- Starring: Zhang Huimin; Wu Suxin
- Production company: Huaju Film Company
- Release date: 1927
- Country: Republic of China
- Language: Silent

Lustrous Pearls (Chinese: 夜明珠; pinyin: Yè Míngzhū), also known as The Lustrous Pearl, is a 1927 film directed by Chen Tian for the Huaju Film Company. Starring Zhang Huimin and Wu Suxin, it depicts the machinations of three men who seek to steal two large pearls from a former colleague. One of several modern costume dramas produced by Huaju, it has been read as an exploration of women's empowerment and the construction of the New Woman.

== Plot ==
In a remote coastal village, four fishermen harvest two large pearls. They are unable to agree how to divide these spoils, and Chang Yung – the eldest – thus gives one to his live-in girlfriend Yu Zhiyin and one to his sister Aye Chien for safekeeping. Angered by Chang's unwillingness to split the bounty, his comrades swear revenge. They contact Yang, a retired bandit, who shows an interest in acquiring the pearls.

The men abduct Chang, bind him, and strand him on an offshore rock; they also abscond with Aye Chien. Chang is rescued by Yu, who braves the waves to save her beloved. The three villains, meanwhile, are angered to discover that they have only recovered one pearl. As they argue, Chan and Yu arrive at their hideout, free Aye Chien, and recover her pearl. They then escape along the rocky coast, pursued by Chang's former comrades until he scares them away by causing a landslide.

Following this failure, Yang breaks into Chang's home and steals the pearls while everyone is sleeping. Chang contacts a friend and asks him to help, but is betrayed and trapped in a desolate ravine. The women, concerned when he does not return, disguise themselves and go searching. Having learned that the plotters intend for Chang to starve to death, they find him in the ravine. One lowers a rope, while the other delays the villains long enough for Chang to escape. Shortly thereafter, the men plant a bomb in Chang's home; the three escape, though Chang is wounded and bedridden.

The plotters then kidnap Yang's daughter, promising to release her if she steals the pearls for them. When she does, they renege on their promise and abandon her by the seaside. Yu and Aye Chien find her contemplating suicide, ashamed by her theft, and promise to retrieve the pearls. They return her to Yang. As the plotters fight over their spoils, Yang arrives and defeats them handily. He returns the pearls to Yu, thanking the women for saving his daughter.

== Production and release ==
Lustrous Pearls was directed by Chen Tian for the Huaju Film Company. It was written by Zhang Huimin, who also starred in the film. The role of Yu Zhiyin was taken by Wu Suxin, who also handled make-up. Editing was done by George Loh, while cinematography was handled by Tong Kim Ding (or Tang Jianting; Chinese: 湯劍廷; Jyutping: Tong1 Gim3 Ting4; pinyin: Tāng Jiàntíng); he also acted in the film. More roles were taken by Liang Saizhen, Ruan Shengduo, Wu Susu, and Zhang Yuepeng.

The film used few intertitles, though these were presented in both English and Chinese, with translations by Sunders Yuen. The intertitles were designed by Tsiang Yung Tsao and presented in an ornate Art Nouveau style. Although the film is set in a rural fishing village, various markers of modernity are presented, including European-style riding breeches and concrete structures. Huaju had established a reputation for making such "modern-costume romances", distinguishing itself from competitors that favoured traditional costumes.

The style and themes of the film drew inspiration from Hollywood serials starring Pearl White, which similarly offered women reaching beyond the domestic to achieve mastery. In her reading of the film, the scholar Zhang Zhen describes Lustrous Pearls as simultaneously providing a message of empowerment in the construction of the New Woman while warning against the inherent dangers, noting the betrayal of Yang's daughter as well as her attempt at suicide. She describes the film as "emphatically about the mobile, indestructible heroine bodies", whose physical differences with their male peers are obscured through long shots of movement and fighting. Lustrous Pearls was released in 1927. It is nine reels in length.

== Works cited ==
- Chen Tian (1927). Lustrous Pearls (stream). Shanghai: Huaju Film Company.
- Zhang, Zhen (2005). An Amorous History of the Silver Screen: Shanghai Cinema, 1896–1937. Chicago: University of Chicago Press. ISBN 978-0-226-98238-0.
