= Zentia =

2010 video game

- Developers: ChangYou; Pixel Soft
- Publisher: ChangYou
- Engine: Zentia (proprietary engine)
- Platform: Microsoft Windows
- Release: Open Beta: October 13, 2010
- Genre: Fantasy MMORPG
- Mode: Multiplayer

Zentia was a free-to-play global MMORPG that takes place in a Chinese fairy tale world, described by its creators as "charmingly hardcore". The game was jointly produced by Changyou and Pixel Soft. Pixel Soft originally debuted the game in China. Changyou implemented a major revamp for North American audiences, which, among other changes, introduced more humor and social aspects. Open Beta for the North American version began on October 13, 2010. The North American version of Zentia officially closed at 11:59 PM PDT on August 13, 2012.

== Overview ==
Zentia featured a humorous comic book style in 3D, unique characters, and a unique social leveling feature that required the entire community to work together to open higher-level game content. New players chose one of 24 pre-made characters, each of which represented a different immortal hero sent to banish the world of demons. The game had a pet system where nearly half of all creatures encountered could be tamed as pets or mounts. Individual mounts could carry anywhere from one to ten players. The game also included a rich crafting system and many PvP options. The guild system was extensive, acting as a larger clan which contained smaller clans, turning those clans into a sort of alliance. Along with a guild came a guild city which contained quests, instances, and NPCs. Players could choose among various classes that had different basic mechanics.
