= Weapons of the Gods (comics) =

Comic book series by Wong Yuk Long

- Cover of Weapons of the Gods, volume 1

神兵玄奇 shén bīng xuán qí
- Genre: Wuxia
- Author: Wong Yuk-long
- English publisher: US: ComicsOne
- Original run: 1996–2005
- Volumes: 9

Weapons of the Gods (神兵玄奇; hanyupinyin: shén bīng xuán qí) is a Hong Kong comic book series by Wong Yuk Long which originally ran between 1996 - 2005. It was translated into English by Bob Allen for ComicsOne. A role-playing game version was published by Eos Press in 2005 and a Chinese cartoon adaptation called Shen Bing Xiao Jiang (神兵小将) was released in 2006.

The story is set during the turbulent transitional period from the Jin Dynasty to the Sixteen Kingdoms era and traces the contention of various pugilists for the divine weapon known as Heaven's Crystal (天晶).

== Plot ==
=== Prelude ===
There were four dominant pugilistic clans hailing from the four cardinal directions of the realms:

1. North: The Bei (北冥) clan, manufacturer of the best weapons in the realms, led by Zheng Bei (北冥正), an ambitious man who dreamed of becoming master of the world.
2. South: The Nan (南宫) clan, based on the Sword Island in Lake Tai, led by Yi Nangong, who had mastered the art of the Sword & was well renowned.
3. East: The Dong (东方) clan, which held sway over the entire coastal region of Bohai Sea, led by Dongfang Yinian (东方一念). They operated the shipping trade and were as rich as an empire, with skills as high as the clouds.
4. West: The Xi (西城) clan, in the Western realms they guarded the pass between east and west, abundant in arms, Its leader, Ho Xi (西城豪), despite being highly skilled, was a rather boorish individual. As a clan they are wealthy but arrogant & unrefined.

In addition, the criminal underworld was dominated by the sinister Heaven-Earth Alliance (天地盟), aka Hell Clan. Its countless minions infiltrate every part of society, and it was widely feared for its brutal methods enforced by most highly skilled members.

The prelude of the tale began in AD 318, with the presentation of Heaven's Crystal by the Imperial Court to Yi Nangong, acknowledged as the pugilist master of the southern lands. In the midst of the festivities of the occasion, his wife, Hong Dong (东方雄), was lamenting over the loss of her husband's affection to his concubine, Jade Swallow (玉燕).

Dongfang Xiong, nicknamed Heartblade (心剑) after her family's swordsmanship form, was acknowledged to be the most beautiful woman in the world. However, she was not able to bear her husband a son early in their marriage, prompting him to dote on Jade Swallow who bore him a son. Though Heartblade later gave birth to a son too, her husband became estranged from her, and she did not join in the celebration.

At the great hall, despite being warned by Heartblade not to accept Heaven's Crystal because of its curse, Yi Nangong did and unsheathed the blades. Inferior weapons in the vicinity shattered at the presence of the divine weapon. The Sky-Lord of the Hell Clan arrived to seize it. He had been issued a specially crafted weapon, Thunder Cudgel, for his mission, leading to the Thunder Cudgel clashing in full force against Heaven's Crystal.

All those present perished in the catastrophic blast that followed, save for a small group of survivors headed by Hong Dong, which completely destroyed Sword Island. She went looking for Jade Swallow right away but discovered that she had been buried after passing away during childbirth.

A month later, a wagon driver arriving at the Beiming foundry in the north discovered the 3-year-old Tian Wen (南宫问天), nursing a baby girl with blood from his finger, at the gate. Despite being a toddler, Wentian exhibited great inner strength.

=== Main plot ===
The story is told 18 years after the prelude is narrated through several concurrent developments which occasionally intersects.

One thread began with two separate threads, one focusing on Dongfang Xiong's reclaiming her legacy, being Dongfang Yinian's firstborn, from her half-brother. Having gathered the survivors of Nangong clan from the cataclysm 18 years before, she returned with vengeance, with her grown-up son, Dongfang Tiexin, to her childhood home where she suffered ignominy for being born a girl.

The other thread focussed on Wentian, having grown up in the Beiming clan with his sister, Wenchai. The Beiming clan was exploring the prospects of a marriage alliance with the Xicheng clan, and Xicheng Hao's son, Xicheng Xiushu (Great Oak) arrived as an emissary.

The Hell Clan took advantage of the two convergences of the greatest sects of the realms to send their most powerful minions to destroy the four clans, or at least cripple them. The master diviner, Zhuo Bufan, had predicted the re-emergence of Heaven's Crystal, and the Hell Clan was intent to wiping out its closest rivals.

As the story developed, more and more divine weapons and instruments were revealed, each having unique powers. There were ten most powerful artefacts created not by mortal hands:

1. Heaven's Crystal (天晶)- A pair of 'mother-son' blades, cursed by the demons it banished.
2. Tiger's Soul (虎魄) - A vampiric halberd crafted by Chi You, cursed by the tiger it is crafted from.
3. Grand Void (太虛) - A single-wheeled chariot crafted by the Yellow Emperor that derived its strength from the righteousness of the user.
4. Tablet of Annihilation (十方俱滅) - Made by Fuxi, it could manipulate time and space.
5. Shennong's Rule (神農尺) - A jade stick capable of healing and poisoning.
6. Spirit Devourer (噬魂) - A three section staff crafted by Raksha, a western reigning god, capable of dealing with the spiritual creatures.
7. Heaven's Executor (天誅) - A crossbow crafted by Raksha's sister. It had nine different arrows crafted from her children, each with unique powers.
8. Evil Shocker (驚邪) - A two-pronged fork created by the gods of thunder and lightning, with electrical and sonic prowess.
9. Divine Dance (神舞) - A pipa made from divine wood formed from Nuwa's arm, capable of sonic attacks as well as hypnosis.
10. Phoenix (鳳皇) - An axe crafted by the Great Yü that could control liquids.

The story went far into realms of fantasy, with the presence of mythic creatures like sentient draconic beasts.

== Sequels ==
The first story focused primarily on the Ten Weapons of the Gods, and on Nangong Wentian.

A sequel was made with the plot being dealing with attempts to revive a long gone evil overlord. Wentian had to combine the prowess of all ten Weapons of the Gods to deal with the ultimate evil. New artefacts emerged, primarily in the form of ten demonic pearls which thrived on the negative emotions of human beings.

A second, two series sequel was made with the story set hundreds of years later, with a new cast of characters, involving the reunifying the crystal shards from the shattered Heaven's Crystal in a new era of heroes and villains. Poor sales led to the writers making crossover references with another ongoing comic series - Legends of the Sons of Heaven (天子傳奇), fantasy retelling of famous Chinese emperors. However, it was unfavourably received by fans who panned it in online forums as being "neither here nor there". There is a third series called Chuang Shi Shen Bing (创世神兵) with an entirely new fantasy setting and a fourth series Shen Bing 4 (神兵4).

A couple of prequels, Shen Bing Qian Zhuan (神兵前傳) were also published, while the first two series are sequels, the plot of the third time traveled to the maternal grandfather and father of Wentian's era, the fourth a prequel about the anti-villain overlord Xuantian Xieti and fifth series is a sequel meeting the Olympians and Norse gods. There is another sequel again of the initial series, Shen Bing Wentian (神兵问天). There is also a spinoff anthology on the past and future wielders of most of the divine weapons, Shen Bing Wai Zhuan (神兵外傳). Two company line crossover series Weapons of the Gods F and Weapons of the Gods F2 were made with the final third series published as Huang Chao Jun Lin (皇朝君临), crossing over with Legends of the Sons of Heaven. An alternate crossover with Legends of the Sons of Heaven first series' Ji Fa, taking place pre-series, was published in 2021.
