= Changyou.com =

Chinese online games operator

Changyou.com Ltd.
- Traded as: Nasdaq: CYOU
- Genre: Massively multiplayer online games
- Predecessor: An online games unit of Sohu
- Founded: August 6, 2007
- Headquarters: Cayman Islands
- Parent: Sohu
- Website: changyou.com

Changyou.com
- Simplified Chinese: 北京畅游时代数码技术有限公司
- Literal meaning: Beijing "Swim Generation" Digital Technology Co Ltd
Transcriptions
Standard Mandarin
- Hanyu Pinyin: Běijīng chàngyóu shídài shùmǎ jìshù yǒuxiàn gōngsī

Changyou.com Ltd. operates online games, primarily massively multiplayer online games, in China. Originally a division of Chinese Internet company Sohu, Changyou was spun off and went public in 2009 through a variable interest entity (VIE) structure based in the Cayman Islands. The company claims it was operating independently of Sohu as early as 2007.

Some of its games derive revenue from the sale of virtual goods, and many are licensed rather than developed in-house. Such deals have helped its roster of MMORPGs swell from two in 2009 to nearly a dozen as of 2014.

c. 2009, its most popular game may have been the MMO Tian Long Ba Bu (Chinese: 天龙八部), which means "Eight Books of the Heavenly Dragon". Some games in its portfolio are available to play outside of China in countries including Malaysia, Taiwan, Thailand, the United States, and Vietnam.

In 2011, the company purchased nearly 70% of a browser games maker, 7Road.

In 2020, the company was acquired by Sohu and all Changyou.com stock was delisted from NASDAQ.

== See also ==
- Blade Wars
- Dragon Oath
- Shadowbane
- Zentia
