= Yang Zhi =

Yang Zhi may refer to:

- Yang Zhi (Sizu) (羊陟), style name Sizu (嗣祖), Eastern Han Dynasty official, see Book of the Later Han
- Empress Yang Zhi (楊芷; 259–292), empress of Jin dynasty (266–420)
- Jiang Nan (novelist) (born 1977), birth name Yang Zhi
- Yang Zhi (footballer) (杨智; born 1983), footballer
- Yang Zhi (Water Margin) (楊志), fictional character in the novel Water Margin
