= Dragon Tiger Gate =

2006 Hong Kong film by Wilson Yip

- Hong Kong theatrical release poster

Chinese name
- Traditional Chinese: 龍虎門
- Simplified Chinese: 龙虎门
Transcriptions
Standard Mandarin
- Hanyu Pinyin: Lóng Hǔ Mén
Yue: Cantonese
- Jyutping: Lung4 Fu2 Mun4
- Directed by: Wilson Yip
- Screenplay by: Edmond Wong
- Based on: Oriental Heroes by Wong Yuk-long
- Produced by: Nansun Shi; Raymond Wong; Yu Dong; Xu Pengle
- Starring: Donnie Yen; Nicholas Tse; Shawn Yue; Dong Jie; Li Xiaoran; Yu Kang; Chen Kuan-tai; Yuen Wah
- Cinematography: Ko Chiu-lam
- Edited by: Cheung Ka-fai
- Music by: Kenji Kawai
- Production companies: Bona Film Group; Shanghai Film Group; Mandarin Films
- Distributed by: Mandarin Films
- Release dates: 1 August 2005 (United Kingdom); 28 July 2006 (Hong Kong)
- Running time: 96 minutes
- Countries: Hong Kong; China
- Languages: Cantonese; Mandarin
- Box office: HK $12,108,465

Dragon Tiger Gate is a 2006 Hong Kong martial arts fantasy film directed by Wilson Yip and featuring fight choreography by Donnie Yen, who also starred in the lead role. The film co-stars Nicholas Tse, Shawn Yue, Dong Jie, Li Xiaoran, Yu Kang, Chen Kuan-tai, and Yuen Wah. The film is based on the manhua Oriental Heroes, which bears the same Chinese title as the film. The film's release in all English-speaking territories is handled by The Weinstein Company.

A punching bag constructed for the film, measuring about 8 feet (2.4 m) high, 5 feet (1.5 m) wide and weighing about 400 pounds, was certified as the world's largest by Guinness World Records.

== Plot ==
Dragon Tiger Gate is an academy established by two powerful martial artists. It aims to train students in martial arts in order to uphold justice and combat the threat of the Triad. It is also a haven for children who had been orphaned by the Triad. While Luocha Cult is a Pan-Asia heretic cult/drug trafficking organization led by the dictating might of its cult leader: Shibumi the Jashin of Frame Cloud. Shibumi, who is the only master of the legendary Yijin Jing and has many fearsome Kung Fu masters at his disposal, controls the entire Asia-Pacific Underground Drug market with Hong Kong as his base of operations.

The story begins with the two sons of Fu Hu Wong, one of the founders of the academy, who were each born to different mothers. The older is named Dragon and the younger is named Tiger. When the boys were young, Dragon's mother left the academy and gave Dragon half of a Jade amulet pendant and told him that his half-brother, Tiger, has the other half. When Dragon's mother was killed in a fire, Dragon was taken under the care of the Triad boss, Ma Kun, and he grew up to become his bodyguard. Ma Kun's gang is a subject of the evil Luocha Cult, which supervises Hong Kong's Drug dealing on its behalf. Tiger was raised by his elder uncle, Master Xian Lung Wong, after his parents' disappearance.

Several years later, Tiger and his friends are dining in a restaurant and encounter Ma Kun and his men, who are receiving the Luocha Plaque. A symbol of authority within the Luocha Cult indicates that the holder is second only to the cult's leader, Shibumi. Ma Kun and the leader of the White Lions Gang were arguing over the plaque when Tiger accidentally interrupts the meeting. One of Tiger's friends makes off with the plaque while Tiger starts a fight with the gangsters. Just then, Dragon appears and fights Tiger, whom he does not recognize to be his half-brother. Ma Kun calls for Dragon to pull back.

Later that night, Dragon confronts Tiger and his friends at a Japanese restaurant to take back the plaque. Tiger and his friends have been drugged by Scaly, one of Ma Kun's lackeys, who also wanted to retrieve the plaque to prove to his boss that he is the better man. Scaly and his followers fight Dragon over possession of the plaque. Turbo Shek, another eater at the restaurant, is aroused by the commotion and he joins the fight on Dragon's side. Dragon and Turbo defeat Scaly and his men and Dragon takes back the plaque from Tiger. Just then, Tiger discovers that Dragon has the other half of the jade amulet pendant and realizes that Dragon is his half-brother.

Turbo follows Tiger back to Dragon Tiger Gate, wanting to be enrolled into the academy to improve his martial arts skills. He is refused by the current leader of the academy, Master Wong, for his arrogance. Dismayed, Turbo waits outside the academy and promises not to leave unless he is accepted as a student. Master Wong agrees to spar with Turbo and defeats him easily. Turbo is humbled and accepted by Master Wong as a student.

Meanwhile, Ma Kun returns the Luocha Plaque to signify his retirement. He is supported by Dragon, who wants to return to Dragon Tiger Gate, and his daughter Ma Xiaoling, who wants a simple life. Shibumi sees this as an insult and sends his henchmen, the Double Devils, to kill Ma Kun. He uses his subordinate Rosa to lure Dragon away while his minions kill Ma Kun. Dragon returns to rescue Ma Kun, but it is too late. Dragon slays the Double Devils after a vicious fight and leaves Ma Xiaoling in his brother's care before leaving. Although he collapses on a grassland after succumbing to his wounds, he survives after having a vision of his young self giving him the jade pendant (his mother once gave him). Meanwhile, Tiger befriends the grieving Ma Xiaoling.

Shibumi was impressed with Dragon for defeating his henchmen and goes to Dragon Tiger Gate to issue a challenge. With Dragon absent, Master Wong, Tiger, and Turbo takes on Shibumi's challenge but were no match for him. As Master Wong had managed to put up a fight before being defeated, he is deemed worthy enough to die at Shibumi's hands while Shibumi spares the severely wounded Tiger and Turbo for their lack of skill. Ma Xiaoling, realizing that Shibumi will eventually come back for her and the rest of them and with Dragon not there, they would lose just as they had this time, brings Tiger and Turbo to Mount Baiyun to seek help from Master Qi as Dragon senses the passing of Master Wong and returns only to find the demolished Dragon Tiger Gate as he realizes he is too late to protect Master Wong, his brother and Xiaoling and screams in sadness before collapsing. Master Qi heals the wounded Tiger and Turbo and trains them for their incoming final battle with Shibumi, including teaching new martial arts techniques: Spinning Lightning Dragon Kick and Invulnerable Golden Bell Technique. Dragon also practices to fight Shibumi for the first and final time after having reminisced of his time with Xiaoling and appears to have developed a new one.

Tiger and Turbo storm Shibumi's Black Pagoda to stop his reign of terror once and for all and engage him in a fierce fight, using all their greatly improved martial arts abilities and the new techniques they have learned to battle him. However, despite putting up a far better fight than before and even being praised by Shibumi for their improved abilities, Tiger and Turbo are ultimately still outmatched and severely beaten. As Shibumi mocks them for having embarrassed the techniques they have learned and is about to finally kill them, Dragon appears to engage Shibumi, tossing the Plaque back in honor of the Gate, and after luring Shibumi away from his injured brother and Turbo, engages him calmly with his improved abilities as he gains the upper hand and even mocks Shibumi to provoke his temper, eventually killing him with his Eighteen Subduing Dragon Palms technique. Before the film ends, Dragon returns to Dragon Tiger Gate together with Tiger and Turbo (who decides to change his name to Leopard) to carry on Master Wong's legacy.

== Development ==
The production group initially proposed that Yen be the director of the film. At a later point the production group found another director and other actors, and suggested that Yen be another actor in the film; Yen decided to do the latter. Yen also did the choreography of the fight stunts.

Shawn Yue experienced an asthma attack during filming.

== Cast ==
- Donnie Yen as Dragon Wong / Wong Siu-long：Personal bouncer of Kun, a gloomy young man but with a sense of justice. Specialized in palm technique "Baguazhang (八卦掌)", later rejoin Dragon Tiger Gate and acquire a new technique "The Eighteen Dragon-Subduing Palms (降龍十八掌)"
  - Howard Sit as young Dragon
- Nicholas Tse as Tiger Wong / Wong Siu-fu：Elder brother of Dragon Tiger Gate, a young man has a strong hatred of evil, specialized in kicking technique "Crack Hammer Kick (裂頭碎石腳)", later acquire a new technique "Electric Dragon Drill Kick (電光毒龍鑽)"
  - Tam Chun-ho as young Tiger
- Shawn Yue as Turbo Shek / Shek Hak-lung：A Russian Chinese specialized in stick fighting, later join as a member of Dragon Tiger Gate and acquired internal strength "Golden Bell Armour (金鐘罩)"
- Dong Jie as Ma Xiaoling：Daughter of Ma Kun
  - Isabella Leong as Ma Xiaoling (voice)
- Chen Kuan-tai as Ma Kun：Leader of Ma's Organization
- Yu Kang as Shibumi：Main villain of the story. Original name Saijyo Yuu, CEO of Japan criminal organization Raksha Gang, a cruel fighter expert in internal strength "Tendon Change Classic (易筋經)"
  - Louis Koo as Shibumi (voice)
- Li Xiaoran as Lousha / Rosa：Original name Saijyo Keiko, a Japanese high ranked female member of Raksha Gang, also a younger cousin of Shibumi
  - Ella Koon as Lousha (voice)
  - Chan Kwan-king as young Lousha
- Yuen Wah as Master Wong：Original name Wong Kong-long, one of the founder of Dragon Tiger Gate, uncle of Tiger and Dragon Wong
- Wong Yuk-long as Master Qi： The sage in Baiyun Mountain, the successor of internal strength "Nine Yang Manual (九陽神功)"
- Vincent Sze as Scaly：Original name Fan Kong Gau, traitor of Ma's Organization and later become member of Raksha Gang
- Tommy Yuen as Xing：Original name Chan Xing, a disciple of Master Wong
- Sam Chan as Ming：Original name Cheung Lap-ming, a disciple of Master Wong
- Alan Lam as Patch：Original name To Tai-lung, a disciple of Master Wong
- Nick Lam as Hei：Original name Ki Man-kit, a disciple of Master Wong
- Xing Yu as Fan：Original name Mori Nobuhiro, a Japanese high ranked member of Raksha Gang, specialized in claw strike fighting
- Yan Hua as Stick：Original name Irie Sachisoku, a Japanese high ranked member of Raksha Gang, specialized in stick fighting
- Sheren Tang as Dragon's mother：Original name Man Hing, first wife of Wong Fook-fu

== Sequel ==
In a Hong Kong interview with the production crew, it was quoted that the cast and crew intends to create a sequel to expand the story on screen by summer of 2007. However, with the original cast committed to a long list of other projects, there has been no indication of any level of production or completion by the announced date. As of now, there has been no further mention of a sequel.

== Reception ==
Paul Fonoroff of the South China Morning Post stated that there was a "bad script" and "plodding plot". Another article by the South China Morning Post stated that the "overtly cartoonish feel" resulted in reception from film reviewers being "lukewarm".
