= Miriam Hansen =

German-American film historian

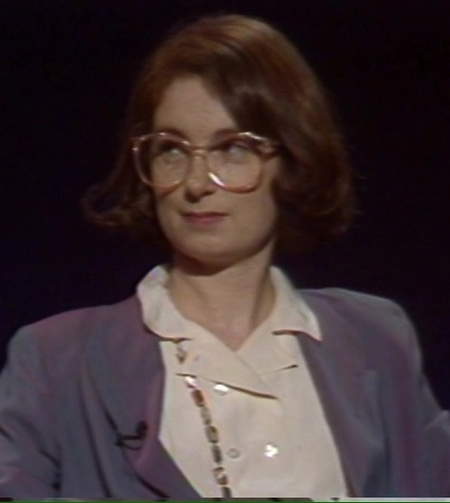
Hansen discusses the film M on CUNY TV's Cinema Then, Cinema Now (1987)

Miriam Hansen (28 April 1949 – 5 February 2011) was a film historian who made important contributions to the study of early cinema and mass culture.

== Career ==
Born Miriam Bratu to Jewish parents, Arthur Egon Bratu and Ruth Bratu, in Offenbach, Germany, Hansen received a doctorate in American literature from Johann Wolfgang Goethe-Universität in Frankfurt. She worked at Yale University and Rutgers before moving to the University of Chicago, where she served as Ferdinand Schevill Distinguished Service Professor in the Humanities at the time of her death. She founded the Department of Cinema and Media Studies at that university.

She is most known for her book Babel and Babylon: Spectatorship in American Silent Film. According to Daniel Morgan of the University of Chicago, "She was in the first generation of scholars to see film viewing as a historically defined and shaped activity . . . And also to understand that that meant we had to look at older films through the lens of the viewers they were intended for.” She saw fans of Rudolph Valentino, for instance, as possibly forming an alternative public sphere to express their desires. Hansen was also a scholar of the Frankfurt school and a prominent interpreter of the theories of Theodor Adorno, Walter Benjamin, and Siegfried Kracauer on mass culture. She focused in particular on cinema as a mode of modernism, coining the term "vernacular modernism" to explain how even the classical Hollywood cinema could be a popular form of modernism that served many cultures as a horizon for coming to grips with modernity. According to fellow University of Chicago professor Tom Gunning, she "provided the best of models for film studies at the moment that it moved from its pioneering focus on Grand Theory to a broader sense of a field that must include archival research, political perspectives, aesthetic awareness and theoretical ambition."

She died of cancer on 5 February 2011 in Chicago at the age of 61.
