= Khoo Fuk-lung =

- Born: 21 February 1964 (age 62) Hong Kong
- Areas: Writer, Artist
- Notable works: Saint

Khoo Fuk-lung
- Traditional Chinese: 邱福龍
- Simplified Chinese: 邱福龙
Transcriptions
Standard Mandarin
- Hanyu Pinyin: Qīu Fúlóng
Yue: Cantonese
- Jyutping: Jau1 Fuk1-lung4

Khoo Fuk-lung (born 21 February 1964), also known as James Khoo, is a Hong Kong manhua artist and writer.
