= Dragon Oath =

2007 video game

- Logo
- Developer: ChangYou.com
- Publisher: Sohu
- Platform: Microsoft Windows
- Release: 2007
- Genre: MMORPG
- Mode: Multiplayer online

Dragon Oath, also known as Tian Long Ba Bu in China, is a free-to-play massively multiplayer online role-playing game developed and published by Changyou.com and Sohu and launched in May 2007. The game's story is based on the novel Demi-Gods and Semi-Devils by Louis Cha. Since its initial launch in China, ChangYou.com has taken steps to sell Dragon Oath on an international stage. The game now (2012) has servers in Europe, Malaysia, Vietnam and the United States. Much like the servers in Europe, the servers in America are scheduled to close on July 25, 2016.

== Gameplay ==
Dragon Oath is a 2.5D martial arts-style fighting and community-building game designed to give players the freedom to "choose their own destiny" and play the game in any way they decide. The game features 9 playable classes based on Ancient Kung-fu disciplines.

== Game setting ==
Dragon Oath is set in a world based heavily on Buddhist cosmology and the concept of the Eight Races of non-human entities. At the heart of the story are three heroes: Qiao Feng, Duan Yu and Xuzhu. Each has his own unique and important role to play, and is instrumental in shaping the game world players find themselves in when they spawn into the Kingdom of Dali for the very first time.

== Accolades ==
Dragon Oath has been awarded the Most-liked Online Game by Game Players by ChinaJoy for five consecutive years from 2006 to 2010 and was ranked amongst the World's Top Five Most Profitable Game Franchises in 2009 by Forbes. It was also ranked by the International Data Corporation as the third most popular game in China.

== Further developments ==
As part of its continuous efforts to spread its flagship brand worldwide, ChangYou.com announced in 2011 that it will release a new, fully localised version of Dragon Oath, designed specifically for the Turkish market.
