= Sparkle Roll =

Hong Kong publishing company

Sparkle Roll (SEHK: 970) is a Hong Kong listed company. Previously known as Jade Dynasty Group Ltd, is in trading of luxury goods like branded watches, jewelry, wines and automobiles, in mainland China. The company changed its name in 2008.

The company has changed its name to “New Sparkle Roll” in November 2021.
