= Shenzhou Daily =

Historical Chinese newspaper

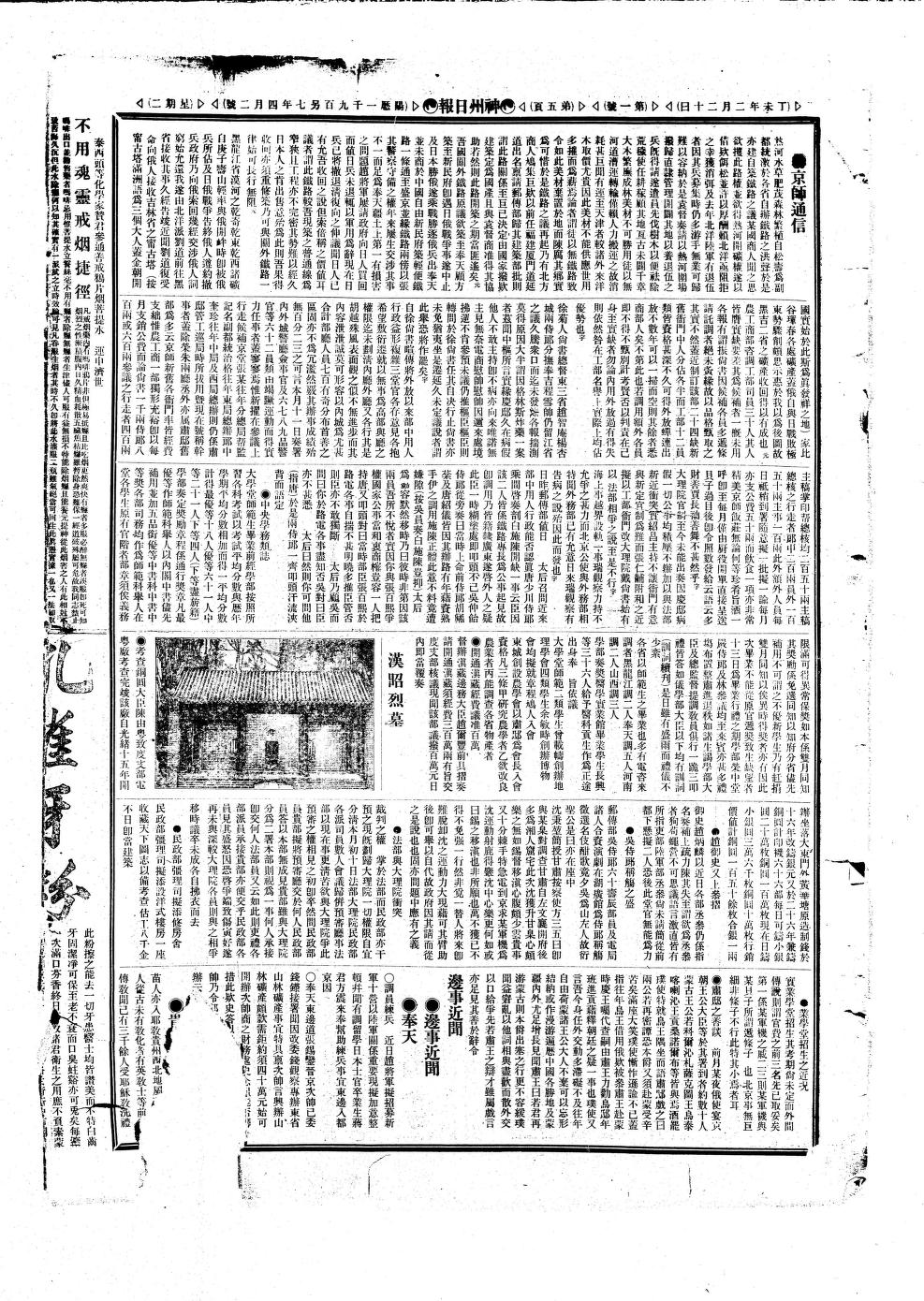
- First edition
- Founded: April 2, 1907
- Ceased publication: December, 1946
- Language: Chinese
- City: Shanghai
- Country: Qing Dynasty; The Republic of China
- Free online archives: Shenzhou Daily at the Internet Archive

Shenzhou Daily (simplified Chinese: 神州日报; traditional Chinese: 神州日報; pinyin: Shénzhōu rìbào), also called The National Herald, was a Chinese newspaper from the late Qing dynasty to the Republic of China. It was founded on April 2, 1907, and ceased publication in January 1927; it resumed publication on October 10, 1936, but its influence was much less than before, and ceased publication again in 1941 due to the outbreak of the Pacific War; it resumed publication on January 1, 1945, and ended publication in December of the following year. During its nearly twenty years of publication from 1907 to 1927, it was one of the more influential newspapers in Shanghai at the time.

== 1907–1927 Period ==
The Shenzhou Daily was established in 1907. The newspaper was organized by Yu Youren, Shao Lizi, Zhang Junsheng, Tan Jieren, etc. The newspaper office was located in the bookstore of the Fuzhou Road in Shanghai. Yu Youren resigned on June 20, 1907, and Ye Renyu and Wang Pengnian became the managers. The chief writer was Yang Dusheng.

At the beginning of its publication, the newspaper actively propagated anti-Qing revolutionary ideas, nationalism and democracy, and had a clear political orientation. After the Republic of China, the newspaper changed owners repeatedly, and after 1915, with the withdrawal of the early newspaper organizers, its political orientation gradually changed, and its sales dropped significantly, and Qian Gaichen took over the editorship in 1918. By the early 1920s, the newspaper was barely maintained by its supplement, The Crystal (simplified Chinese: 晶报; traditional Chinese: 晶報; pinyin: Jīngbào).

The newspaper had circulation of more than 10,000 copies per day, and included extensive advertising material. It established a supplemental, the , which was headed by 1910 by the manhua artist Ma Xingchi; he had previously published several works in the newspaper, including an illustration of the Qing dynasty standing idly by as western powers coveted Chinese soil. Published as part of the Shenzhou Daily's first anniversary edition, this cartoon depicted the newspaper as seeking to "awaken" the slumbering populace to the contemporary socio-political climate. On March 3, 1919, the Shenzhou Daily began publishing a tabloid titled The Crystal. It published news and rumours gathered by amateur staff, as well as literary works in the Mandarin Duck and Butterfly (such as by Bao Tianxiao and Zhang Chunfan) and in other styles (including works by Ouyang Yuqian, Yuan Kewen, and Zhang Henshui).

At the beginning of the publication, the size of the folio was three large sheets with twelve editions. The contents of each edition are as follows:

- First page: editorials, commentaries, special telegrams
- Second and third pages: domestic and foreign news
- Forth page: Provincial News
- Fifth page: Shanghai Affairs Commentary, Local News, Business News
- Sixth：Yuruwenyuan and others
- Other six pages: announcements and advertisements.

== Works cited ==
- Kang, Wenqing (2006). Male Same-Sex Relations in China, 1900–1950 (PhD thesis). University of California, Santa Cruz. ProQuest 305350088.
- He, Qiliang (2018). Newspapers and the Journalistic Public in Republican China: 1917 as a Significant Year for Journalism. New York, London: Routledge. ISBN 978-0-429-79669-2.
