= The Crystal (tabloid) =

Chinese newspaper, 1919 to 1940

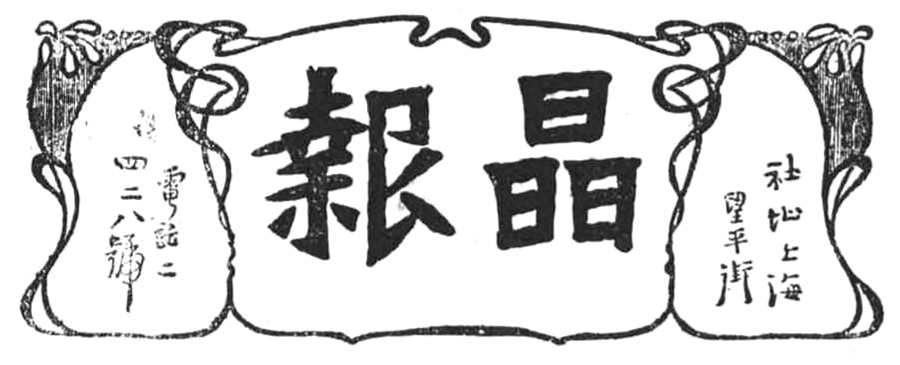

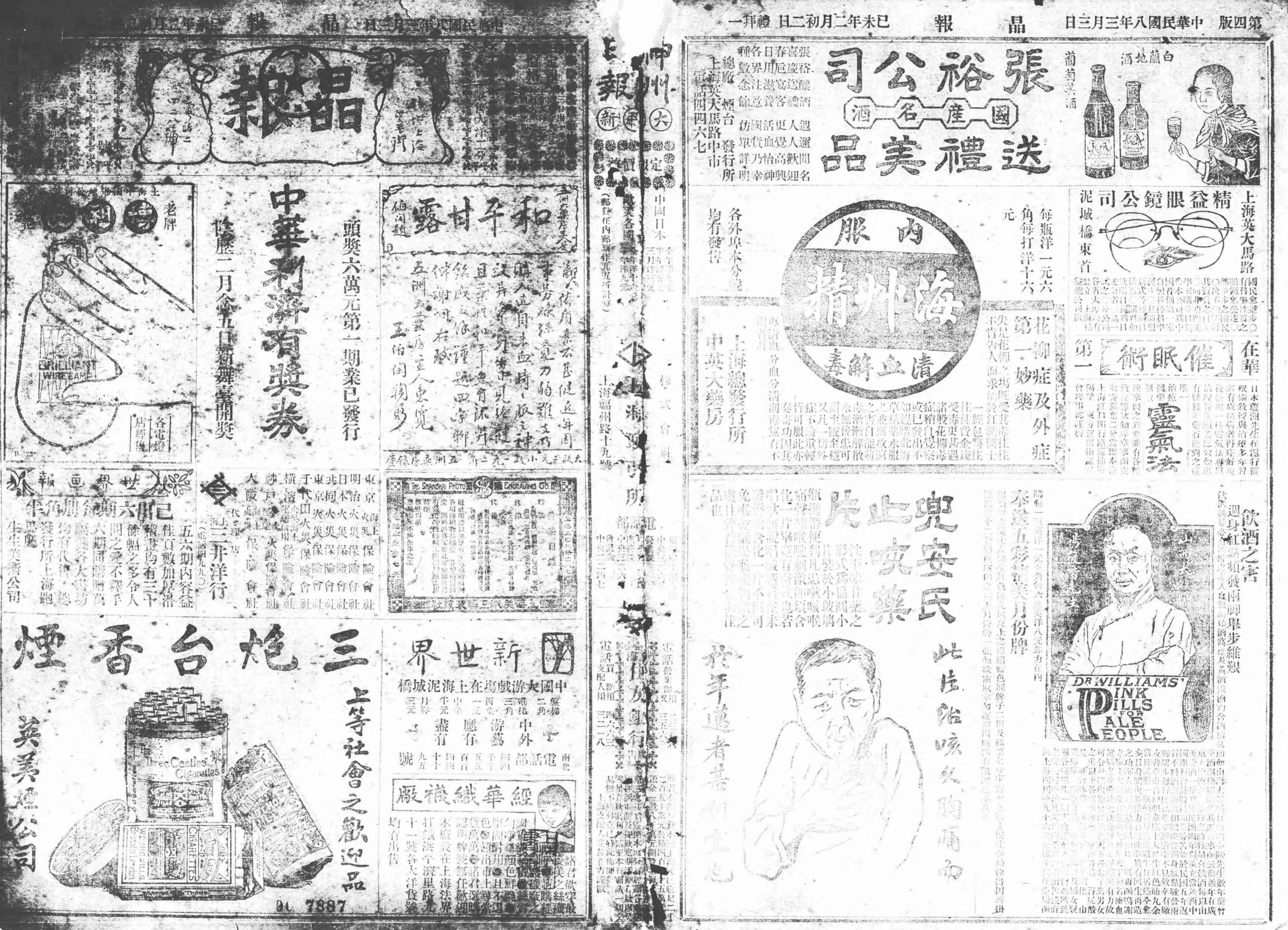
- The Crystal, Issue 1
- Native name
- Traditional Chinese: 晶報
- Simplified Chinese: 晶报
- Literal meaning: Crystal Newspaper
Transcriptions
Standard Mandarin
- Hanyu Pinyin: Jīngbào
- Wade–Giles: Ching^{1}-pao^{4}
Yue: Cantonese
- Jyutping: zing^{1} bou^{3}
- Format: Tabloid
- Founded: March 3, 1919
- Ceased publication: 1940
- Language: Chinese
- City: Shanghai
- Country: Republic of China
- Free online archives: The Crystal at the Internet Archive

The Crystal (simplified Chinese: 晶报; traditional Chinese: 晶報; pinyin: Jīngbào) was a Shanghai-based tabloid published between 1919 and 1940. Initially a supplement to the Shenzhou Daily, it was established by Yu Daxiong and initially edited by Zhang Danfu. First published on 3 March 1919, subsequent issues were released every three days, with reported circulation ranging from 10,000 to 100,000 copies. The tabloid was closed in 1940, having been warned against the publication of lewd articles the previous year.

Topics covered in The Crystal varied, and included news, gossip, and advertisements, as well as rumours. Particular emphasis was given to discussion of courtesans and nightclub hostesses, though the publication – unlike many of its contemporaries – also discussed matters of same-sex relationships and intersex people. The Crystal has been identified as Shanghai's most famous tabloid.

== History ==
The Crystal was established in 1919. Initially a literary supplement for the Shenzhou Daily, the first issue was published on 3 March 1919. Subsequent issues were published every three days; this was the source of its name, as the Chinese character for "crystal" (晶) consists of the character for "day" (日) repeated three times. Due to its smaller size, approximately half that of mainstream papers, it was categorized as a "small paper" (小報, xiǎobào), also translated "mosquito press".

The Crystal's founder, the businessman Yu Daxiong (余大雄), would regularly travel to the homes of novelists and essayists to request works; his conversations likewise provided material for publication. Other materials were collected by amateur news gatherers, under the supervision of editor-in-chief Zhang Danfu. Many of its early literary contributors were Mandarin Duck and Butterfly writers, including Bao Tianxiao and Zhang Chunfan. Other contributions came from Ouyang Yuqian, Yuan Kewen, and Zhang Henshui.

Various circulation numbers are reported, from 10,000 to 50,000 copies at the tabloid's peak; one article, commemorating the fourth anniversary of the tabloid's establishment, claimed a circulation of 100,000. As copies were shared, readership was likely higher than reported. This made it the third most-read newspaper in Shanghai. After the Northern Expedition of 1927, The Crystal allied itself with the Kuomintang.

The Crystal had rivalries with several other tabloids. On 8 October 1923, following continued satirization in The Crystal, a group of writers launched a competing tabloid titled The Diamond; this title was meant to imply superiority, due to diamonds' ability to cut through most materials. Likewise, in 1928 The Crystal and The Holmes (a legal-minded tabloid established in 1926) entered into a court case disputing a work's originality.

By the 1930s, The Crystal was being published by A. L. Teodoro. After being warned against "publishing articles of lewd and indecent nature" in November 1939, he was tried by the United States Court for China and found guilty of publishing four such articles in 1940. Teodoro was fined US$10 (equivalent to $230 in 2025) and given a suspended sentence of ten months. Four Chinese publishers, Chow Tien-lai, Woo Chi-ts, Chang Ziang-sun, and Woo Tsung-chi, recertified the tabloid in their names. The tabloid discontinued publication later that year.

== Contents ==
In its contents, The Crystal was varied. The tabloid included news and fiction, as well as poetry, games, advertisements, and letters. It also provided reviews of drama, song, and dance. In the late 1920s, it included several pieces of Kuomintang propaganda. As with other tabloids, The Crystal generally eschewed political discussion, focusing on matters of entertainment.

As with other contemporary tabloids, The Crystal extensively reported rumours as well as salacious stories that had not entered the mainstream press. One edition, published in the 1920s, covered a brothel visit by Hu Shih – a man who had received the sobriquet "the father of enlightenment". Such coverage at times resulted in lawsuits. In 1926, The Crystal was sued by a German doctor after it alleged that the plaintiff had not succeeded in improving the performance of Qing-era scholar Kang Youwei. After its alliance with the Kuomintang, it attempted to better protect itself from lawsuits.

The Crystal covered the courtesans of Shanghai extensively, including their relationships with each other, their involvement with local elites, the general state of the business, and the names and telephone numbers of brothels. Several issues contained retrospectives on women who had since left the business; one issue, published in 1930, reminisced on the murdered courtesan Wang Lianying and discussed the state of her family. Sometimes mentioned in this discussion were the geisha houses found along North Sichuan Road. When the administrations in Shanghai were in the process of abolishing licensed prostitution, essays in The Crystal questioned the prudence of this decision.

Other coverage in The Crystal dealt with questions of homosexuality and gender performance, with gender politics discussed particularly often in the 1920s. Some articles decried the rise of Western-style girls' schools, inferred to be "hotbeds for female same-sex relations", while others derogatively framed lesbians as members of the "mirror-rubbing gang" (磨镜觉). (Note: Kang (2006, pp. 175–187) discusses one case, in which a woman named Liu Jingzhu was imprisoned after a consensual sexual relationship with the younger Huang Xiaomei. Initially charged with "seduction with consent", Liu's offence was later identified as "illicit sex by rubbing" (擦奸). The Crystal followed the case extensively, with discussion including whether the crimes of rape and seduction could be perpetrated by women, the terminology used by the courts, as well as ongoing public conflicts between Liu and Huang.) Several stories used the slur renyao (人妖; 'abnormal person') to refer to persons deemed sexually abnormal. These included persons who cross dressed, intersex individuals, female-presenting male prostitutes, and other men who have sex with men. Stories published in The Crystal asserted that powerful figures, such as President Cao Kun and former Emperor Pu Yi, had become involved in same-sex relationships with younger men.

The Crystal, as with other Shanghai tabloids, also promoted the city's cabarets and nightclubs through the 1920s and 1930s. It reported on affairs such as price reductions and installation of air conditioning; the tabloid also discussed the women hired to dance with patrons, providing detailed profiles of some twenty-eight women between 1930 and 1935. By 1939, it offered a half-page column dedicated exclusively to the nightclubs and hostesses.

== Legacy ==
The Crystal was described by Perry Link as the "premier example of the mosquito press" in Shanghai in his discussion of early twentieth-century Chinese fiction. In her exploration of sex work in Shanghai, Gail Hershatter describes The Crystal as Shanghai's most famous tabloid.

The Crystal was one of few contemporary Chinese publications to regularly cover same-sex relationships and other LGBTQ issues. Its framing of gender non-conformance, according to the gender studies scholar Kang Wenqing, derived from the perception that such individuals "transgressed existing sexual and gender norms", thereby undermining the strength of the nation. Likewise, Kang describes its discussion of lesbian relationships as providing cultural conservatives with a means of venting "their anxieties over the reorganization of the gender order". Male homosexual relationships, meanwhile, were used to symbolize weakness in political rule.

== Works cited ==
- Field, Andrew (2010). Shanghai's Dancing World. Hong Kong: Chinese University of Hong Kong Press. doi:10.1353/book24630. ISBN 978-962-996-923-3.
- He, Qiliang (2018). Newspapers and the Journalistic Public in Republican China: 1917 as a Significant Year for Journalism. New York, London: Routledge. ISBN 978-0-429-79669-2.
- Hershatter, Gail (1992). "Courtesans and Streetwalkers: The Changing Discourses on Shanghai Prostitution, 1890-1949" (PDF). Journal of the History of Sexuality. 3 (2): 245–269. JSTOR 3704057.
- Hershatter, Gail (1999). Dangerous Pleasures: Prostitution and Modernity in Twentieth-Century Shanghai. Berkeley: University of California Press. ISBN 978-0-520-20439-3.
- Kang, Wenqing (2006). Male Same-Sex Relations in China, 1900–1950 (PhD thesis). University of California, Santa Cruz. ProQuest 305350088.
- Laing, Ellen Johnston (2004). Selling Happiness: Calendar Posters and Visual Culture in Early-Twentieth-Century Shanghai. Honolulu: University of Hawai'i Press. ISBN 978-0-8248-2764-9.
- Zhang, Jing (2021). "Creating Entertaining Lawsuits: Defamation and Tabloid Publicity in 1920s Shanghai". Twentieth-Century China. 46 (1): 41–61. doi:10.1353/tcc.2021.0003.
