= Wonderful Nightmare =

2015 South Korean film by Kang Hyo-jin

- Theatrical poster
- Directed by: Kang Hyo-jin
- Written by: Kim Je-yeong
- Produced by: Cha Sang-min
- Starring: Uhm Jung-hwa; Song Seung-heon
- Cinematography: Sohn Won-ho
- Edited by: Shin Min-kyung
- Music by: Kim Eun-young
- Distributed by: Megabox Plus M
- Release date: August 13, 2015 (South Korea)
- Running time: 123 minutes
- Country: South Korea
- Language: Korean
- Box office: US$6.6 million

Wonderful Nightmare (Korean: 미쓰 와이프; lit. 'Miss Wife') is a 2015 South Korean fantasy romantic comedy film starring Uhm Jung-hwa and Song Seung-heon.

The early Korean working title literally translates to Wonderful Nightmare (멋진 악몽; Meotjin angmong), which was retained for the international English title.

== Plot ==
Yeon-woo is a successful lawyer who gets into an automobile accident leading her to fall into a coma. She wakes in heaven to find that her death was a clerical error and it was actually an old woman with the same name who was meant to die.

To hide the mistake, she is asked to live as another woman – a housewife who was also killed by mistake – for just one month. Married to a very ordinary civil servant named Sung-hwan with a difficult teenage daughter and a precocious six-year-old, Yeon-woo finds herself changing in unexpected ways as well as facing challenges she hasn't faced before.

== Cast ==
- Uhm Jung-hwa as Lee Yeon-woo
- Song Seung-heon as Kim Sung-hwan
- Kim Sang-ho as Chief Lee
- Ra Mi-ran as Mi-sun
- Seo Shin-ae as Kim Ha-neul
- Lee Seung-ho as Kyeong-ho
- Jung Ji-hoon as Kim Ha-roo
- Lee Seung-ho as Choi Kyung-hoon
- Lee Jun-hyeok as Section chief Choi
- Kim Byung-chul as Jin-man
- Go Soo-hee as Head of women's society
- Kim Jae-man as Section chief Park
- Jo Duk-jae as Doo-man
- Hwang Geum-byul as Senior Jo
- Yoon Boo-jin as Hyun-seo's mother
- Lee Mi-yoon as Sung-soo's mother
- Park Yoo-mil as Min-ah's mother
- Lee Yong-nyeo as Kyung-rae
- Lee Woo-joo as Hyun-seo
- Yoon Joo as Ji-min
- Seol Ji-yoon as Ji-min's mother
- Kang Eun-ah as So-ra
- Bae Min-jung as Woman in formal dress
- Kim Young-moo as Kyung-hoon's lawyer
- Lee Jong-goo as Mr. Kim, the guard
- Heo Jung-eun as Chan-mi
- Lee Hye-rin as Ji-woo
- Kwon Soo-jung as young Yeon-woo
- Ahn So-yeon as student-age Yeon-woo
- Park Sang-hyuk as Yeon-woo's assistant
- Go On as Park Chan-jin
- Hwang Suk-ha as Team leader Kim
- Kim Do-yeon as Resident
- Yang Do-yeon as Lawyer Park
- Kim Byung-choon as Principal (cameo)
- Yeom Dong-heon as Head of the district (cameo)
- Kim Hye-na as Yeon-woo's mother (cameo)
- Choi Il-hwa as Chairman Park (cameo)
- Jung Ji-yoon as Pharmacist (cameo)
- Jung Yoo-suk as Public prosecutor Choi (cameo)

== Adaptations ==
A Taiwanese film adaptation titled Beautiful Accident was released in 2017, starring Gwei Lun-mei and Chen Kun.

In December 2023, it was announced that a Philippine film adaptation of the same title will be released in 2024, to be starred by Sarah Geronimo and Matteo Guidicelli, but this was shelved due to still unknown reasons. More than two years later, it was announced in February 2026 that Jerald Napoles and Kim Molina will star in the Philippine adaptation, with a scheduled release on February 25, 2026; the release date was eventually rescheduled to April 4, 2026 in order to make way for the real-life wedding of Molina and Napoles.

== Awards and nominations ==
Year	Award	Category	Recipient	Result
2015	52nd Grand Bell Awards	Best Actress	Uhm Jung-hwa	Nominated
