= Jingbao =

Jingbao or Jing Bao may refer to:

- Peking Gazette (京報; Jīngbào), Beijing-based official bulletin of the Qing dynasty (1644–1912)
- The Crystal (tabloid) (晶報; Jīngbào), Shanghai-based tabloid published between 1919 and 1940
- Keng Po (newspaper) (競報; Jìngbào), Malay-language Chinese newspaper published in the Dutch East Indies from 1923 to 1958
- Beijing–Baotou railway or Jingbao railway (京包铁路; Jīngbāo Tiělù)
- China National Highway 110 or Jingbao highway (京包公路; Jīngbāo Gōnglù; "Beijing–Baotou highway")

== See also ==
- The Beijing News (新京报; "New Jingbao"), Beijing-based newspaper founded in 2003
