= Fate in Tears and Laughter (film) =

1932 Chinese romantic drama film

- Newspaper advertisement
- Traditional Chinese: 啼笑因緣
- Simplified Chinese: 啼笑因缘
Transcriptions
Standard Mandarin
- Hanyu Pinyin: Tíxiào Yīnyuán
- Wade–Giles: T`i^{2}hsiao^{4} Yin^{1}yüan^{2}
- Directed by: Zhang Shichuan
- Screenplay by: Yan Duhe
- Based on: Fate in Tears and Laughter by Zhang Henshui
- Starring: Hu Die; Xia Peizhen; Wang Xianzai
- Cinematography: Dong Keyi; Wang Shizhen; James Williamson
- Production company: Mingxing Film Company
- Release date: 26 June 1932
- Running time: 69 minutes
- Country: Republic of China
- Language: Mandarin

Fate in Tears and Laughter (traditional Chinese: 啼笑因緣; simplified Chinese: 啼笑因缘; pinyin: Tíxiào Yīnyuán) is a 1932 Chinese romantic drama directed by Zhang Shichuan for the Mingxing Film Company. Based on Zhang Henshui's novel of the same name, it follows a young student who falls in love with a singer, even as another woman vies for his attention and a relative attempts to match him with a third. Filmed in Beijing over the course of two months, Fate in Tears and Laughter was subjected to a copyright lawsuit after its première that delayed screening for three months.

== Plot ==
During the Warlord Era, Fan Jiashu is studying in Beijing while pining after the singer Fengxi. Meanwhile, Guan Xiugu, the daughter of his friend, has fallen in love with him; her feelings become stronger after Fan helps pay to treat her ailing father. She decides to acquiesce, however, when she learns of Fan's love for Fengxi. Meanwhile, Fan's cousin attempts to set him up with the wealthy heiress He Lina.

One day, while Fan is travelling to Hangzhou, Fengxi is married to a local warlord as his second wife. Her mother asks Fan for help, and although he desires to rescue her, he sees Fengxi seemingly smitten with the warlord. Guan, seeing him fall into a depression, decides to pass as a servant and arrange for Fan and Fengxi to meet. When they do, Fan is unable to convince the singer to escape with him.

Enraged by Fengxi's meeting with Fan, the warlord abuses her to the point of institutionalization. He also begins to make advances on Guan, who strings him along before ultimately leading him to an isolated place and killing him. Fan and Guan free Fengxi from the psychiatric hospital, but she has no memory of them. Later, following a note from Guan's father, Fan travels to Western Hill, where He Lina awaits him.

== Production ==
Fate in Tears and Laughter was directed by Zhang Shichuan for the Shanghai-based Mingxing Film Company. The screenplay was written by Yan Duhe, while cinematography was by Dong Keyi, Wang Shizhen, and James Williamson. Made with an announced budget of 1.2 million yuan (equivalent to ¥97,000,000 in 2019), production of the film was featured in Mingxing's 1931 film An Amorous History of the Silver Screen.

Mingxing announced its intention to produce Fate in Tears and Laughter on 18 September 1930, issuing a press release that it would be adapting Zhang Henshui's novel of the same name. Serialized in the Xinwen Bao newspaper between 1929 and 1930, the novel Fate in Tears and Laughter had become a reader favourite and quickly adapted to comics, radio, and stage. The company did not, however, register for legal protection of their adaptation rights. Location shooting for the film took place in Beijing over the course of two months.

Fate in Tears and Laughter starred Hu Die, Xia Peizhen, Wang Xianzai, Gong Jianong, and Zheng Xiaoqiu. Hu performed dagu, a form of traditional narrative song, for the film.

== Release and reception ==
Fate in Tears and Laughter premièred at the Nanking Theatre on Edward VII Avenue in Shanghai on 26 June 1932. Within three days, however, the film had been withdrawn from circulation as the rival Dahua Film Company under Gu Wuwei had pre-emptively registered a copyright on the film and was suing for copyright violation. Compounding the issue, Dahua had secured support from the gangster Huang Jinrong. Mingxing thus hired another gangster, Du Yuesheng, who secured permission for Mingxing to continue its release. These contestations cost Mingxing 100,000 yuan (equivalent to ¥9,100,000 in 2019) to cover the fees demanded by Du Yuesheng as well as the potential losses incurred by Dahua.

In September 1932, Fate in Tears and Laughter was again screened, split into six episodes released in increments through the end of the year. Commercial performance was mediocre, and reviews criticized the film's plot and acting. Meanwhile, Hu Die became plagued by rumours that she had been dancing with the warlord Zhang Xueliang in Beijing while Japan invaded Manchuria unopposed; she and other cast and crew paid for advertisements repudiating the claims, calling them Japanese-sponsored slander meant to undermine Zhang and his Northeastern Army. In her history of Mingxing, Huang Xuelei writes that the financial aftermath of the film's troubled production and subsequent legal woes nearly destroyed the company. Unlike most of Mingxing's output, which is lost, Fate in Tears and Laughter is extant.

== Works cited ==
- Huang, Xuelei (2014). Shanghai Filmmaking: Crossing Borders, Connecting to the Globe, 1922–1938. Leiden: Brill. ISBN 978-90-04-27933-9.
- Lee, Lily Xiao Hong (2015). "Hu Die". In Lee, Lily Xiao Hong; Stefanowska, A.D. (eds.). Biographical Dictionary of Chinese Women: The Twentieth Century, 1912–2000. London and New York: Routledge. pp. 236–242. ISBN 978-0-7656-0043-1.
- Xiao, Zhiwei (1998). "Zhang Shichuan". In Zhang, Yingjin; Xiao, Zhiwei (eds.). Encyclopedia of Chinese Film. New York, London: Routledge. pp. 161–162. ISBN 978-0-415-15168-9.
- Zhang, Zhen (2005). An Amorous History of the Silver Screen: Shanghai Cinema, 1896–1937. Chicago: University of Chicago Press. ISBN 978-0-226-98238-0.
