= Li Dawei (director) =

Chinese film and TV director (1970–2018)

Li Dawei (simplified Chinese: 李大为; traditional Chinese: 李大為; 1970 – 10 April 2018) was a Chinese film and television director best known for his 2003 television series The Story of a Noble Family and the 2009 film A Tale of Two Donkeys (走着瞧). He won the China Television "Top 10 Director" award in 2003 and the Golden Rooster Award for Best Directorial Debut in 2009.

== Biography ==
Li was born in 1970. His mother Liu Guoquan (刘国权) is also an actress and director. His parents hoped he would become a lawyer or doctor, but he showed far more interest in performing arts. He graduated from Beijing Film Academy in 1993 with a major in cinematography. He chose cinematography because the academy did not accept any student for directing in his class.

After graduation Li joined the Beijing Film Studio, working as a director and cinematographer. In 2003, he directed the television series The Story of a Noble Family. It was widely praised and launched its main actors, Chen Kun, Dong Jie, and Liu Yifei into stardom. As a result, Li won the China Television "Top 10 Director" award for that year. He collaborated with his mother in several television series.

In 2009, Li directed the film A Tale of Two Donkeys (走着瞧), a fantasy romantic comedy starring Wen Zhang. It received wide acclaim and Li was recognized with the Golden Rooster Award for Best Directorial Debut.

On 10 April 2018, Li died from intrahepatic cholangiocarcinoma at Tsinghua Changgeng Hospital in Beijing, at the age of 47.
