= Chunming waishi =

1924 novel by Zhang Henshui

- Cover of a 1925 edition of the novel
- Author: Zhang Henshui
- Original title: 春明外史
- Language: Chinese
- Published: 1924-1928
- Publication place: China

Chunming waishi (Chinese: 春明外史), sometimes translated into English as An Unofficial History of Beijing, An Unofficial History of the Imperial City or Romance in the Imperial City, is a Chinese novel written by Zhang Henshui, and is considered to be one of Zhang's best-known works. Serialized between 1924 and 1928, the novel was published across many editions throughout the 1920s. Chunming waishi consist of over 900,000 words and it turned Zhang into a major literary celebrity of his time.

Chunming waishi was a transitional and breakthrough novel for Zhang, whom previously had been mainly known as a writer of romantic urban fiction. While retaining some of the melodramatic and sentimental features of the Mandarin Ducks and Butterflies literature that was popular with the public at the time, the novel is in many ways, an expansive and epic social novel, and a chronicle of an era and its people. The story focuses on the life of young reporter Yang Xingyuan (originally from Anhui), and his various relationships, encounters and adventures in Beijing. The novel features a large cast of characters from all backgrounds of society, including writers, journalists, warlords, Chinese opera performers, socialites, prostitutes and courtesans, university students, teachers, actors, political activists, politicians, etc., and offers a sweeping, romantic and tumultuous portrayal of Beijing during the early 20th century.
