= Jinfen shijia =

1930 novel by Zhang Henshui

Jinfen shijia (A Family of Distinction)
- Cover of a 1934 edition of the novel (volume three)
- Author: Zhang Henshui
- Original title: 金粉世家
- Language: Chinese
- Published: 1927-1932
- Publication place: China

Jinfeng shijia (Chinese: 金粉世家), translated into English as A Family of Distinction and the Gold Dust Dynasty, is a Chinese novel by Zhang Henshui, one of the most prolific and popular 20th-century mainstream Chinese novelists. First published in 1927, like many of Zhang's novels, the story is set in early 20th century Beijing. The lengthy novel (in many volumes) contains over one million Chinese characters and is considered to be one of the longest novels of Zhang's career and a representative work of Zhang.

Like many of Zhang's novels, the work has also been considered by some literary critics to be part of the "Mandarin Ducks and Butterflies" school of novels that was popular during the early 20th century, although Zhang himself rejects such labels, and Jinfen shijia is much more well-regarded, ambitious and voluminous than a typical "Butterflies" novel. The novel has also invited comparisons to Lin Yutang's 1939 Beijing-set novel Moment in Peking.

Similar to many of Zhang's other novels, such as Fate in Tears and Laughter, Jinfen shijia is also a frequent subject of media adaptations and it been adapted into many radio shows, films and television series.

== Adaptations ==
The novel has been adapted numerous times, including a 1961 Hong Kong film, a 1980 Hong Kong TVB series called Yesterday's Glitter (京華春夢), a 1988 Taiwan Television series, and a 2003 China Central Television series called The Story of a Noble Family.
