= Bao Tianxiao =

Chinese writer and translator (1876–1973)

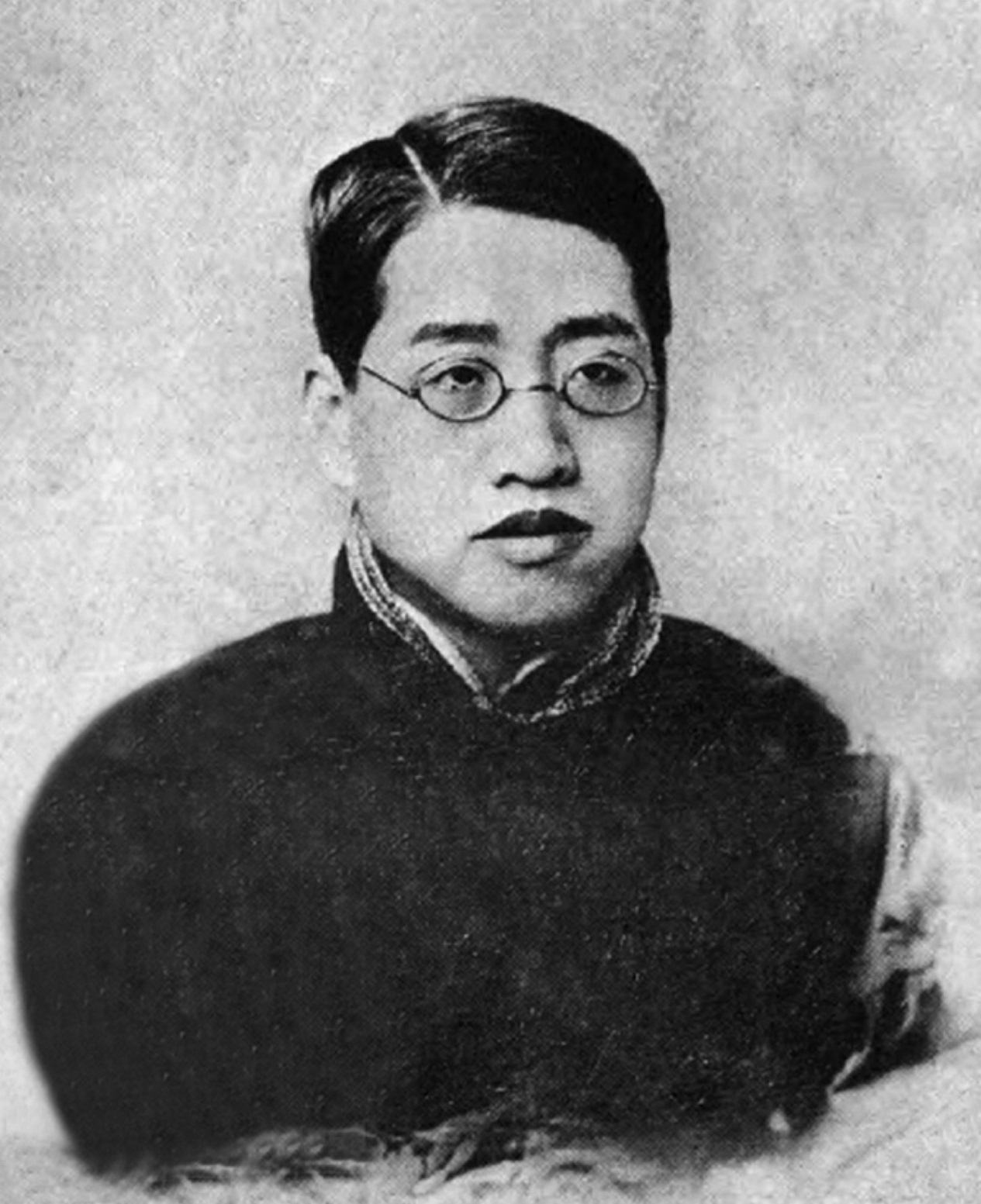
- Bao, c. 1914
- Born: Bao Qinzhu (包清柱); 1876; Wu County, Jiangsu, Qing China
- Died: 24 October 1973 (aged 96–97); Hong Kong
- Occupations: Author, translator, screenwriter

Chinese name
- Chinese: 包天笑
Transcriptions
Standard Mandarin
- Hanyu Pinyin: Bāo Tiānxiào
- Wade–Giles: Pao^{1} T`ien^{1}hsiao^{4}

Bao Tianxiao (Chinese: 包天笑; pinyin: Bāo Tiānxiào, 1876 – 24 October 1973) was a Chinese writer and translator. Born in Jiangsu, he completed the imperial examination in 1894. However, having grown interested in literature through his reading, he left his hometown in 1900 to travel to Nanking before settling in Shanghai. He translated numerous works, wrote multiple original novels, and edited several magazines. Building on this success, he adapted his works into screenplays for the Mingxing Film Company. These included Lonely Orchid, one of the most successful silent films in Republican China. Bao remained active through the 1960s, having moved to Hong Kong after the Chinese Civil War.

Identified by critics as part of the Mandarin Ducks and Butterflies school of Chinese literature, Bao has not been recognized in the country's literary canon. Nonetheless, his The Schooling of Xin'er – an adaptation of Edmondo De Amicis's Heart – was a common gift to graduates and received an award from the Republican government. At the same time, he cultivated a network of writers, helping shape the careers of Zhou Shoujuan, Bi Yihong, and Jiang Hongjiao.

== Biography ==
=== Early life and translation activities ===
Bao Tianxiao was born Bao Qinzhu (包清柱) in Wu County, Jiangsu (now part of Suzhou), in 1876. The son of a merchant family, he attended a private school beginning at the age of five. In his memoirs, Bao recalled that he had been a sickly child, nearly dying from measles when he was fifteen. When his father died in 1892, Bao took to working to support his family. His family subscribed to the Shen Bao, and through this and other publications Bao was exposed to European and Japanese fiction.

In the late 19th century, the Jiangsu area had a prominent literati class, and thus Bao had ready access to calligraphy, music, painting, and poetry; he learned calligraphy under Yao Mengqi. Bao read for the imperial examination, passing its lowest level in 1894 and becoming a tutor. He soon became the headmaster of a middle school in Shandong, in which capacity he remodelled classrooms and installed new teaching implements. Bao took the courtesy name Bao Langsun (包朗孫; 包朗孙).

Bao left Suzhou in 1900, first travelling to Nanking. There, he established the Donglai Bookstore together with some friends, serving as its manager; the shop sold not only Chinese books, but also imports from Japan. Through the early 1900s he was active as a translator, writing under several pen names; these included Tianxiao, as well as Chunyun, Wei Miao, Jiaye, Nianhua, Qiuxinggezhu and Chuanyinglouzhu. With Yang Zilin, he translated H. Rider Haggard's Joan Haste, which was serialized in his magazine Lixue Translation. Another translation, The Schooling of Xin'er (from Edmondo De Amicis's 1886 children's novel Heart), received an award from the Ministry of Education for best original work; its status as a translation was not immediately acknowledged. Through the 1920s, he completed more than thirty translations; Bao also established the Suzhou Vernacular Newspaper, which focused on politics.

=== Work in Shanghai ===
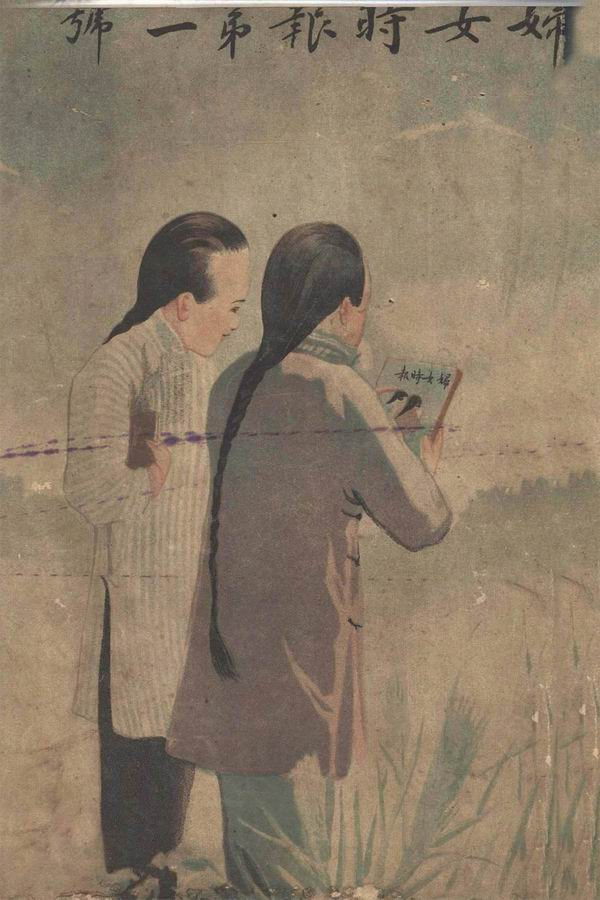
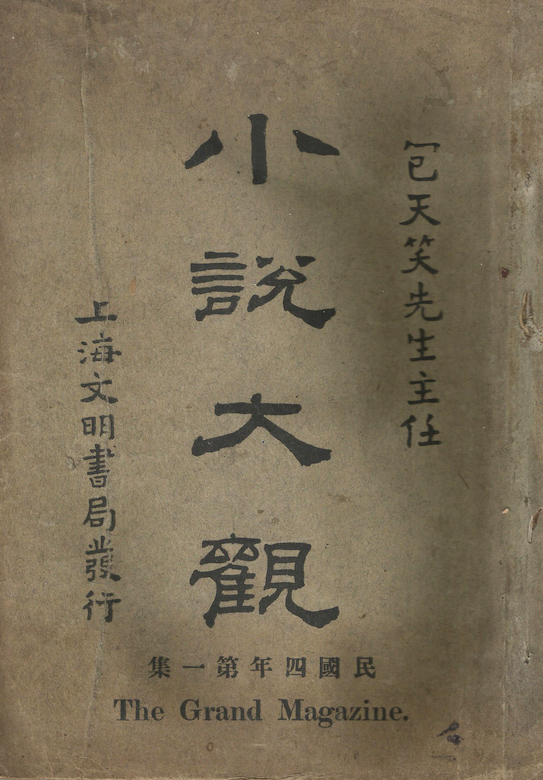
Two magazines edited by Bao: Women's Times (1911) and The Grand Magazine (1916)

In 1909, Bao moved to Shanghai, where he began working for the Shanghai Times. While with the newspaper, he introduced a column titled the "Equality Pavilion" (平等閣) in which readers could submit poems for publication; such reader participation efforts were uncommon in contemporary Chinese media. He was later entrusted with several of the Times' supplementals, including the literary Novel Times and the women-targeted Women's Times. Another magazine, Novel Pictorial, ran from 1917 through 1920, and featured hand-drawn illustrations for each of its original stories. Bao also established a large format magazine, titled The Grand Magazine, for publishing works of fiction in their entirety; each issue contained multiple stories and was a minimum of three hundred pages in length. Through the end of the decade, he contributed to and edited more than a dozen magazines.

Bao also wrote extensively during this period. His novel Liufang Ji featured the opera singer and dan performer Mei Lanfang as its protagonist, using it to explore the events of the early Republic of China. He also worked on civilized dramas, staging an adaptation of Victor Hugo's Angelo, Tyrant of Padua (1835) via a Japanese translation by Satō Karoku. As a result of these activities, he was invited to work with the Commercial Press to prepare textbooks. In 1913, Bao spent time in Japan, publishing a piece of travel literature retelling his journey in the Times upon his return. In the 1920s Bao operated the Jinsuzhai Translation Office, which published works by translators such as Yan Fu as well as a new printing of Tan Sitong's book Ren Xue.

With the popularity of his translations and original works, Bao was approached by the Mingxing Film Company in 1925. The company offered him 100 yuan per month (equivalent to ¥9,620 per month in 2019), with the expectation that he would produce one screenplay every month. Bao later recalled that Zheng Zhengqiu, a dramatist who had co-founded Mingxing, arrived in his office and offered these terms with the understanding that Bao would provide the rights to two of his most popular novels, Lonely Orchid and Fallen Plum Blossoms. Bao accepted these terms, and within a week he had produced a treatment for Lonely Orchid, which he had translated from a British novel via a Japanese-language translation by Kuroiwa Shūroku.

Mingxing released its Lonely Orchid on 13 February 1926, one of the most successful Chinese films of the silent era. Previously, the company had filmed Bao's The Story of a Poor Vagrant Boy, adapted from Kikuchi Yūhō's Japanese-language translation of Hector Malot's Sans Famille (1878), as Little Friends (1925). It also made A Married Couple in Name Only (1927), based on Bao's original novel A Thread of Hemp, and released a film adaptation of Fallen Plum Blossoms on 20 March 1927. Other films written by Bao for Mingxing included A Sincerely Pitiful Girl (1925), Her Pain (1926) Resurrection of Conscience (1926), and A Good Man (1926). Bao remained on contract with Mingxing until November 1927, when he was downsized as a result of budget cuts. His The Schooling of Xin'er was adapted to film by Wu Yonggang for the United Photoplay Service in 1933.

=== Later years and death ===
Through the late 1930s, Bao published editorials that staunchly opposed the encroaching Imperial Japanese Army. He lived in Shanghai through 1948. He later described the Japanese occupation of the 1940s as "the most bitter period of his life", a period of suffering when he wrote nothing for eight years. He began writing again in the mid-1940s, with a 1945 article titled "This Year's Special Wishes" highlighting glutinous rice porridge – which he had not eaten in two years – as his greatest desire.

During the Chinese Civil War, Bao moved to Taiwan with his son Ke-hung. There, he published The New Story of the White Snake. He later settled in Hong Kong, where he published his memoirs in 1971. Bao died on 24 October 1973, having recently completed a 99-page treatise on changes in food, clothing, and shelter in the past century.

== Analysis ==
Since the 1950s, Bao has been identified as a member of the Mandarin Ducks and Butterflies school of Chinese literature; this dismissive label, generally used to identify works of "overly sentimental love stories", frustrated him. Consequently, he has not been included in the Chinese literary canon. At the same time, he was considered one of the greatest writers of the school, with the literary critic Wei Shaochang identifying him as one of its "five tiger generals" (五虎将) together with Li Hanqiu, Xu Zhenya, Zhang Henshui, and Zhou Shoujuan. The sinologist Perry Link argues that Bao and his fellow writers, as with many authors active in the May Fourth era, had sought to "bring enlightenment" to the Republic of China.

Bao considered The Schooling of Xin'er to be his "proudest accomplishment". The book was widely read through the 1910s and 1920s, with copies distributed to graduates and excerpts published in school textbooks. The novel included several episodes not found in its Japanese source, which Bao based on the experiences of his own family. The work was extensively Sinicized, with names and diction changed to reference Chinese geography and history; at the same time, foreign characters were cast as villainous and demeaning of the Chinese. It also included various modifications, recasting the narrator as an old man named after Bao's deceased son while simultaneously conveying Confucian values.

Generally, Bao experimented with different forms, and as such contemporary critics deemed him a "jack of all trades". He did not work with drafts, preferring instead a fluid approach completed without revision. From his youth, Bao's writing style was characterized as "easygoing" – a label used by his imperial examiner. Link described Bao as having "a true gift for describing ordinary events in daily life without their seeming at all dull or ordinary."

In his translation, Bao generally used a system wherein one translator read the work in the original language while another wrote it in Chinese; such an approach was also used by his contemporary Lu Xun. In his memoirs, Bao recalled that translation offered an "open and free job, and my thoughts of stipends from the academies came to be replaced ... by thoughts of selling translations. The one hundred yuan I had received from the Civilization Book Co., for example, was enough for the family to live on for several months." Bao cultivated a network of literary proteges that included Zhou Shoujuan, Bi Yihong, and Jiang Hongjiao. For many, he acted as a surrogate father.

In his role as editor of the Women's Times, Bao advanced the magazine as a means of spreading information to women. He advocated for women to be involved as writers and content creators, with a focus on issues related directly to their lives; these included entertainment, family, marriage, school, and work. Women featured in the magazine included the journalist Tang Xiuhui, the aviator Zhang Xiahun, as well as the educator Lü Bicheng. To increase coverage, he published photographs submitted by readers. Most readers and contributors, however, were men.

== Works cited ==
- 包天笑与《妇女时报》 [Bao Tianxiao and The Women's Times] (in Chinese). Shanghai: China Modern and Contemporary Press and Publication Museum. 11 January 2024. Archived from the original on 5 January 2025.
- Gu Yaxin (顾亚欣) (2019). 包天笑 [Bao Tianxiao]. 苏州通史·人物卷 [General History of Suzhou – Figures] (in Chinese). Vol. 2. pp. 60–61.
- Huang, Xuelei (2014). Shanghai Filmmaking: Crossing Borders, Connecting to the Globe, 1922–1938. Leiden: Brill. ISBN 978-90-04-27933-9.
- Link, Perry (1982). "An Interview with Pao T'ien-hsiao" (PDF). Renditions (17 and 18): 241–253. Archived (PDF) from the original on 13 February 2015.
- Liu, Siyuan (2007). "Adaptation as Appropriation: Staging Western Drama in the First Western-Style Theatres in Japan and China". Theatre Journal. 59 (3): 411–429. doi:10.1353/tj.2007.0159. JSTOR 25070065.
- Sibau, Maria Franca (2016). "Portrait of the Artist as a Schoolboy: Bao Tianxiao's Creative Interventions in "Little Xin's School Journal"". Modern Chinese Literature and Culture. 28 (2): 1–42. JSTOR 24886574.
- Xie Qizhang (谢其章) (11 May 2020). 包天笑与杂志界 [Bao Tianxiao and the Magazine Industry]. The Paper (in Chinese). Archived from the original on 5 January 2025.
- Yeh, Emilie Yueh-yu; Tam, Enoch Yee-lok (2018). "Forming the Movie Field: Film Literati in Republican China". In Yeh, Emilie Yueh-yu (ed.). Early Film Culture in Hong Kong, Taiwan, and Republican China: Kaleidoscopic Histories. University of Michigan Press. pp. 244–276. doi:10.1353/book.57846. ISBN 978-0-472-12344-5.
