= Funü Shibao =

Chinese women's magazine (1911–1917)

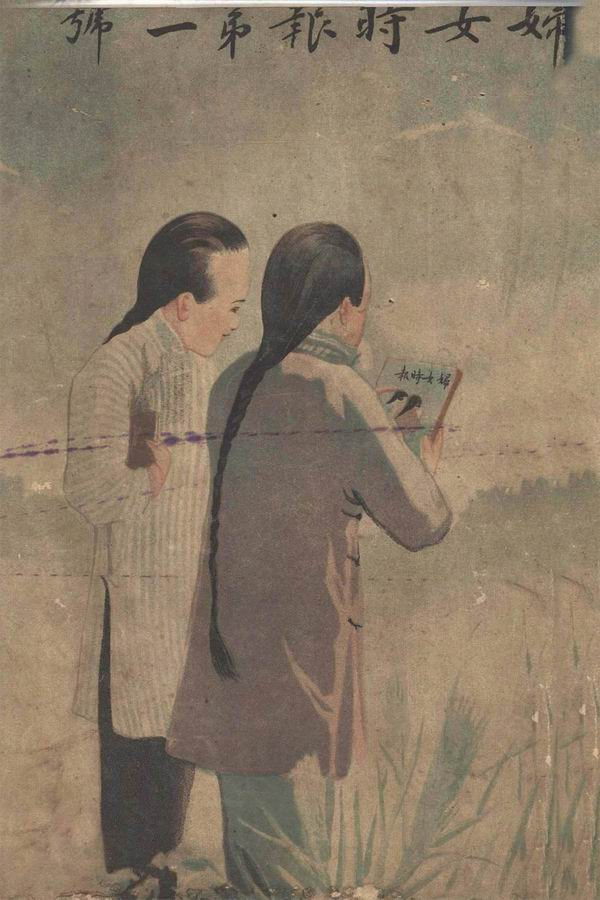
- Native name
- Traditional Chinese: 婦女時報
- Simplified Chinese: 妇女时报
Transcriptions
Standard Mandarin
- Hanyu Pinyin: Fùnǚ shíbào
- Wade–Giles: Fu^{4}nu^{3} Shih^{2}pao^{4}
- Editor-in-chief: Bao Tianxiao
- Categories: Women's magazines
- Frequency: Monthly
- Founder: Di Baoxian
- Founded: 1911
- First issue: 11 June 1911
- Final issue: 1917
- Company: You Zheng
- Country: China
- Based in: Shanghai
- Language: Chinese

Funü Shibao (Chinese: 婦女時報; pinyin: Fùnǔ Shíbào; lit. 'Women's News') was a Chinese monthly women's magazine that was published from 1911 to 1917 in Shanghai, China. It was the earliest commercial women's magazine in the country.

== History and profile ==
Funü Shibao was established by Di Baoxian in 1911. The first issue appeared on 11 June 1911. The magazine was published by Funü Shibao Division at You Zheng publishing company on a monthly basis. Bao Tianxiao served as the editor-in-chief of the monthly, which had its headquarters in Shanghai.

Funü Shibao featured articles written by women. Many revolutionary women wrote for the magazine, such as Zhang Mojun. The magazine covered articles about female liberation as well as fashion and hairstyles for women. It also contained work translated from Japanese. The number of female readers increased over time.

The magazine ceased publication in 1917.
