= Beautiful Accident =

- Theatrical release poster
- Directed by: Ho Wi-ding
- Written by: Ha Zhichao; Zhou Jialin
- Screenplay by: Ha Zhichao; Zhou Jialin
- Story by: Kim Je-yeong
- Produced by: Wang Zhonglei; Chen Kun
- Starring: Gwei Lun-mei; Wang Jingchun; Ouyang Nana; William Wang; Chen Kun
- Cinematography: Wade Muller
- Edited by: Xu Weirao
- Music by: Robin Coudert
- Production companies: Huayi Brothers; Showbox
- Distributed by: Huayi Brothers
- Release date: 2 June 2017
- Running time: 105 minutes
- Country: Taiwan
- Language: Mandarin
- Box office: US$1.6 million

Beautiful Accident (Chinese: 美好的意外) is a 2017 Taiwanese comedy-drama film directed by Ho Wi-ding and co-produced by Chen Kun. The film stars Gwei Lun-mei, Chen Kun, Wang Jingchun, Ouyang Nana, and William Wang. It is a remake of the 2015 South Korean film Wonderful Nightmare.

== Plot ==
A single and career-driven lawyer is given a second chance in life following a fatal car crash. In the span of seven days, she finds herself taking on a new life where she assumes the role of a housewife, taking care of her architect husband and two children.

== Cast ==
- Gwei Lun-mei as Li Yuran
- Wang Jingchun as Station master
- Ouyang Nana as Xing Xing
- William Wang as Tian Tian
- Joy Pan as Qian's mom
- Hsieh Ying-xuan as Ms Zhao
- Peggy Tseng

=== Special appearance ===
- Chen Kun as Zhang Tao / Zhang Zijun

== Soundtrack ==
No.	Title	Lyrics	Music	Performer	Length
1.	"Beautiful Accident 美好的意外"	Zhang Chang, Zhang Pengpeng and Tang Guanyuan	Aaron Benward, Micah Wilshire and Kautz	Suho and Chen (EXO)	02:57

=== Featured song ===
No.	Title	Writer(s)	Performer	Length
1.	"Up and Down 上下上下"	Ilem	Luo Tianyi

== Awards and nominations ==
Award	Category	Recipients	Result	Ref.
25th Beijing College Student Film Festival	Best Actress	Gwei Lun-mei	Nominated	
