= Love on Credit =

- Film poster
- Directed by: Leste Chen
- Produced by: Li Ming; Chen Kun; Zhang Yibai
- Starring: Lin Chi-ling; Liao Fan; Chen Kun; Tony Yang; Jiayi Zhang
- Cinematography: Chiang Min-chung
- Edited by: Wenders Li
- Music by: Wu Qingfeng; Kung Yu-Chi; Lin Wei-Tse
- Distributed by: K Pictures; Xiaoma Benteng
- Release date: October 20, 2011 (China)
- Running time: 94 minutes
- Country: China
- Language: Mandarin

Love on Credit (Chinese: 幸福额度) is a 2011 Chinese romantic comedy film created by Zhang Yibai, adapted from one of its novels of Megan Tay, and released by Xiaoma Benteng. It was directed by Leste Chen. The film stars Lin Chi-ling, Chen Kun, Liao Fan, Tony Yang and Jiayi Zhang.

== Plot ==
The film begins with a pair of twin sisters named XiaoHong and XiaoQing. They have two totally different personalities. XiaoQing believes in true love. By contrast, her elder sister XiaoHong only trusts money. XiaoQing is about to get married with her boyfriend of 10 years, Jiang Cheng. She had been working very hard to save money to buy her own house. But Jiang Cheng not only hung around everyday, but was also cheated and lent all of XiaoQing's saving to an unreliable friend. XiaoQing was too angry to leave Jiang Cheng and felt desperate to keep their love alive. She applied for many credit cards and dressed herself like a high-class lady so that she could get a rich man to marry her.

On the other side, Xiaohong has been in love with her boss for 10 years; waiting ruined all her hope for love. She decided to evaluate men according to their credit cards. Then she met Zhang Quan who could shop without limits. She believes the reason she made friends with Zhang Quan is solely because she loves his money. But is this really true?

Can Xiaohong and Xiaoqing achieve happiness at last?

== Cast ==
- Lin Chi-ling as XiaoHong & XiaoQing: Two modern ladies who want to love but deny themselves true love
- Chen Kun as Zhang Quan: A rich lonely young man. Most of his childhood friends only wanted him when they needed money, so he has never had a serious relationship
- Liao Fan as Jiang Cheng: The boyfriend of XiaoQing who was cheated by his best friend into giving him his entire savings.
- Tony Yang as Shen Tao: A single rich man who can't deal with relationships with girls well. Many of his past girlfriends only dated him because of his money

== Songs of the film ==
The theme song throughout the movie was also titled "Happiness Quota". It was released on 19 September 2011. Sodagreen vocalist Greeny Wu, spent 20 minutes writing the song. At the first listen of the song, one of lead roles, Lin Chi-ling was too moved to cry. The song was later included on their 8th studio album What's the Trouble on Your Mind, which released on 11 November 2011.

She said "The song expresses my moods and feelings in the movie completely."

- Happiness Quota (Theme song)
- Swallow's Nest (background music)
- What are You Worrying About (background music)
- Swallow's Nest (background music)

== Cast On the Set ==
Chen Kun said he threw Lin Chi-ling on to the bed on the first day of their working. Then he added more details. In the first act, Lin Chi-ling has to play a role of a drunk girl. To make the role more vivid, she drunk a lot.

According to Lin Chi-ling, during the process of making the movies, she dared not to look at Chen Kun's eyes, because they were extremely attractive. She was afraid of falling in love with Chen Kun during filming.

Introduced by direct Chen, three men in the film all have complex relationships with the role Lin Chi-ling played. So when Liao Fan claimed he is Lin Chi-ling's fiancé，Chen Kun expressed that Lin Chi-ling belongs to him in a hurry which made Lin Chi-ling very happy.
