= The Story of a Noble Family =

- Poster
- Chinese: 金粉世家
- Hanyu Pinyin: Jīn Fěn Shì Jiā
- Genre: Period; Romance
- Based on: Jinfen Shijia by Zhang Henshui
- Written by: Liu Guoquan; Han Xiaoxi; Wang Jun
- Directed by: Li Dawei
- Starring: Chen Kun; Dong Jie; Liu Yifei
- Theme music composer: Sanbao
- Opening theme: Dark Fragrance (暗香) by Sha Baoliang
- Ending theme: Let Her Fall (让她降落) by He Lu
- Country of origin: China
- Original language: Mandarin
- No. of episodes: 40

Production
- Executive producers: You Jianming; Wang Guohui; Lin Wei
- Producers: Hu En; Li Ning; Wu Liuhan
- Production location: China
- Cinematography: Fu Guobao; Liu Ruixun
- Editor: Wu Zhaolong
- Camera setup: Xie Tianxiang; Cao Dun
- Running time: 45 minutes per episode
- Production companies: CCTV; Guangzhou Impact Audio-Video Ind.

Original release
- Network: CCTV-8 (China); ETTV (Taiwan)

The Story of a Noble Family (Chinese: 金粉世家) is a 2003 Chinese television series based on Zhang Henshui's novel Jinfen Shijia, directed by Li Dawei. The series was first broadcast in 2003 on China Central Television in mainland China.

Due to the success of The Story of a Noble Family (the writer was from Fenghuang County, Hunan), the major cast members were designated as "Honorary Citizens" of Fenghuang County.

== Synopsis ==
Jin Yanxi, a young man from a noble and influential family, falls in love with a girl named Leng Qingqiu, who comes from a poor but scholarly background. They continue to date even though the difference in their respective social statuses prevents them from being together. Bai Xiuzhu, a girl from another affluent family, also falls in love with Yanxi, who rejects her and goes on to marry Qingqiu. However, Yanxi's restlessness, spoilt personality and boredom of life after marriage prompts him to have an extramarital affair with Xiuzhu. He eventually becomes distant from Qingqiu and plans on leaving her and his newborn son so that he can accompany Xiuzhu to Germany.

When the house in which Qingqiu and his son lives catches fire, Yanxi, who couldn't find them, believes his wife and son have died and collapses in sorrow and regret. After the fire, Yanxi receives a final letter from Xiuzhu saying she has left for Germany without him, to marry someone else. Yanxi leaves for the train station and imagines himself finding Qingqiu and hugging her. Unbeknownst to Yanxi, Qingqiu and their son actually survived the fire and is actually near him on a southbound train. Yanxi boards a train heading in the opposite direction after seeing that there is nothing left for him at home (his family is breaking up since his father had been robbed of his wealth and had died). The once loving couple now part ways and is unknown whether they ever reunite.

== Cast ==
- Chen Kun as Jin Yanxi
- Dong Jie as Leng Qingqiu
- Liu Yifei as Bai Xiuzhu
- Kou Zhenhai as Jin Quan
- Wu Jing as Mrs. Jin
- Huang Meiying as Mrs. Leng
- Xu Lu as Xiaolian
- Wang Bozhao as Bai Xiongqi
- Chi Shuai as Liu Chunjiang
- Shu Yaoxuan as Song Shiqing
- Sun Ning as Wu Peifang
- Yang Peiheng as Jin Pengzhen
- Luo Shanshan as Jin Daozhi
- Shu Chang as Jin Meili
- Li Le as Ouyang Yujian
- Li Kechun as Ouyang Qian
- Shi Danjiang as Liu Shouhua
- Pan Juan as Cui Yi
- Qiao Zhenyu as Haoran
- Zhan Xiaodan as Wanxiang
- Chen Ting as Lin Jiani
- Huang Ailing as Han Ma
- Zuo Yiming as Wang Youchun
- Lin Zhe as Bi Yunbo
- Chen Zengyun as Zeng Cizhang
- Zhang Li as Xiaolan
- Zhang Jinling as Mrs. Liu
- Sun Ting as Xie Yushu
- Cheng Luan'an as Mr. Jia
- Long Mei as Laobao
- Wang Guan as A'nan
- Li Xueyan as Jiang Ma
- Li Juan as Mrs. Bai
- Zhu Tie as Jin Fengju
- Chen Jun as Jin Hesun
- Liu Qian as Jin Minzhi
- Mi Yang as Jin Runzhi
- Ma Jie as Jin Rong
- Liu Jiajia as Wang Yufen
- Tao Rong as Cheng Huiguang
- Lan Xiaoxia as Qiu Xizhen
- Yang Jing as Second mistress
- Pan Xingyi as Third mistress
- Chen Shanshan as Qiuxiang
- Yang Shu as Liu Baoshan
- Yu Tong as Chen Yufang
- Mei Lina as Xiaomei
- Sun Chenggang as He Mengxiong
- Yao Yanlin as Mr. Chai
- Huang Yongxing as Dehai
- Xie Zhijian as Liu Cizhang
- Ma Yansong as Mrs. Lin
- Li Zhaomin as Physician Liang
- Wang Yong as Li Sheng
- Xie Zhenwei as Wu Daoquan
- Yao Zhonghua as Xiaohong
