= Eyebrow Talk =

Chinese magazine (1914–1916)

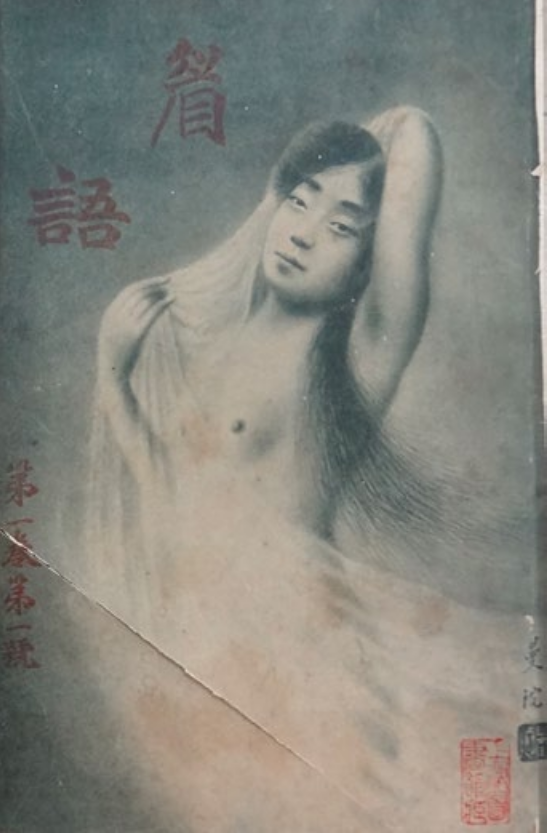
- Cover of the 1st issue, 17 November 1914
- Editor: Gao Jianhua
- Categories: Literary magazine
- Frequency: Monthly
- Circulation: 10,000 (1915)
- Publisher: New Learning Society
- First issue: November 1914
- Final issue: c. April or May 1916
- Country: China
- Based in: Shanghai
- Language: Chinese
- OCLC: 1054865424

Chinese name
- Traditional Chinese: 眉語
- Simplified Chinese: 眉语
Transcriptions
Standard Mandarin
- Hanyu Pinyin: Méiyǔ
- Wade–Giles: Mei^{2}-yü^{3}
- IPA: [měɪ.ỳ]
Yue: Cantonese
- Yale Romanization: Mèih-yúh
- Jyutping: Mei4-jyu5
- IPA: [mej˩ jy˩˧]

Eyebrow Talk (Chinese: 眉語; pinyin: Méiyǔ) was a Chinese monthly literary magazine published in 18 issues from November 1914 to around April or May 1916. It was among the first literary magazines in China to be marketed towards women and the first to be primarily edited by women. Its founder and editor-in-chief was Gao Jianhua, who worked closely with Xu Xiaotian (her husband and cousin) and a staff of mainly female assistant editors. At least ten different women are confirmed to have written for the magazine, alongside some men who wrote under female pen names. Reaching a claimed circulation of 10,000 by 1915, the magazine was published by the New Learning Society, which mostly published school textbooks.

The magazine featured provocative content in its advertising, covers, pictures, and writings. Although dubbed a "young ladies' fiction monthly", Gao noted that "cultured gentlemen" would enjoy Eyebrow Talk for its many pictures of women. Often nudes or semi-nudes, these pictures were frequently sourced from French postcards (a term for Western erotic cards). Less risqué images showing romantic couples or scenes of everyday life were also printed, often juxtaposed with poetry and prose fiction about them. Romantic depictions of editors Gao and Xu were also printed, such as love letters and a story by another author about their relationship.

Although avoiding explicit pornography or alluding to sex beyond euphemism, Eyebrow Talk's libertine content ran afoul of the Ministry of Education's Popular Education Research Association, which supervised and occasionally censored published material. A subcommittee initially led by Lu Xun investigated the magazine and in August 1916 unanimously voted to ban it; after implementation by the Ministry of the Interior the following month, it became the first Chinese magazine to be banned on obscenity charges. Eyebrow Talk had already stopped publication for unclear reasons several months before its ban; it had fallen greatly behind its schedule and its publisher may have preemptively halted it due to the Ministry of Education investigation.

== Publication history ==
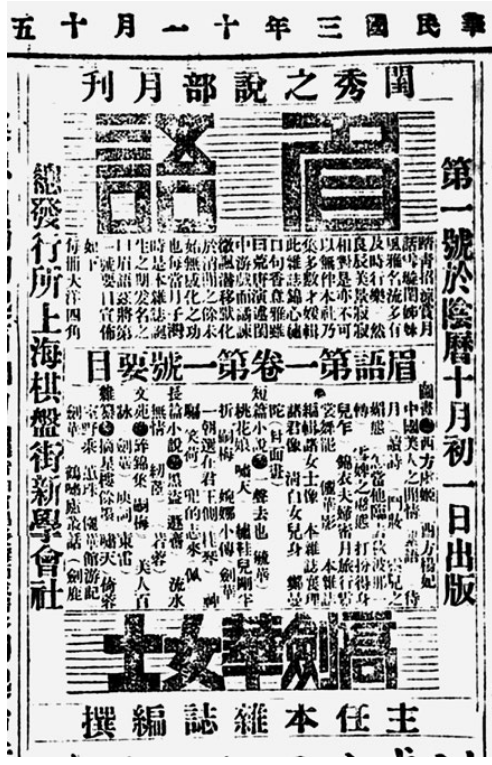
Advertisement for the first issue of Eyebrow Talk, 15 November 1914

The first issue of the magazine Eyebrow Talk (眉語; Méiyǔ) was published in Shanghai, China, on 17 November 1914, the first day of the tenth lunar month. (Note: The initial publication date is frequently but erroneously given as 1 October 1914, the first day of the tenth month of the Gregorian calendar.) It was published by the New Learning Society (新學會社; Xīnxué huìshè), which otherwise mainly published school textbooks through distributors across China. Shanghai was then the center of the Chinese publishing industry, as the nation's literary scene began to emerge from a period of inactivity during the collapse of the Qing dynasty and the early Republican period, in about 1908–1914. Its founder and editor-in-chief was Gao Jianhua (高劍華), a female writer from Hangzhou who was born around the late 1880s. She worked closely with Xu Xiaotian, her husband and cousin.

Eyebrow Talk was among the first Chinese literary magazines to be marketed towards women, as well as the first known to be edited by a woman. An early advertisement for the magazine, published in the Shanghai newspaper Shen Bao on 15 November 1914, headlines it as a monthly literary magazine for guixu (闺秀), referring to young women from the gentry class. The name Eyebrow Talk (also translatable as "the language of eyebrows") connotes flirting, as used in a Chinese figure of speech, "the eyebrows talk and the eyes smile" (眉語目笑; Méiyǔ mùxiào). Another explanation is given in a declaration printed on the inside cover of the first issue, referring to its publication every lunar month: "Whenever the new moon shows its arch, this magazine will appear, hence the title Eyebrow Talk" (eyebrows are commonly used to personify arch-like shapes in Chinese).

Gao and Xu were aided by a male assistant editor—writer Wu Jianlu (吳劍鹿)—and three female assistant editors: Ma Simei (馬嗣梅), Gu Renchai (顧紉茝), and Liang Guiqin (梁桂琴). It was one of the only magazines in early 20th-century China with a sizeable proportion of female editors and contributors. More than twenty contributors wrote for the magazine under the titles of nushi (女士) or nushi (女史), both equivalent to "miss" or "madam". Some contributors were men who published under women's names and titles, a common practice during the period. At least ten female writers (out of around twenty claimed) are verifiable through their photographs being featured in the magazine. The second issue of the magazine featured a call for submissions from "all women of refined character and distinguished standing", promising artistic freedom free from rigid literary structures.

Gao was the most prolific female writer for the magazine, contributing seven short stories and an unfinished serialized novel. Two other female writers—Xu-Zhang Huiru and Liu Peiyu—contributed multiple stories to the paper, and the others each contributed one. Most have very little information available about their lives; biographical information is only known for Gao and another contributor, Xu Yuhua (許毓華, likely Xu Xiaotian's niece).

Eyebrow Talk claimed in advertisements that it reached circulation of 5,000 for its first issue and 10,000 for its seventh. Each issue cost 4 jiao (0.40 yuan); this was twice the price of its competitors published by larger publishing firms, such as the Chung Hwa Novel Magazine (中華小說界; Zhōnghuá xiǎoshuō jiè), published by Zhonghua Book Company. The publication of the fifth issue was delayed, with a notice included in the magazine that Gao had been sick for several weeks and was unable to write.

The magazine was published monthly until its eighteenth and final issue dated 3 April 1916. By then it had fallen greatly behind schedule. One scholar, Guo Haofan, dates the final issue instead to 30 May 1916. The reasons for the magazine ceasing publication are unclear; historian Michel Hockx attributes its end to a decision by the New Learning Society to avoid incurring hostility from the Ministry of Education, which began a censorship campaign of offensive works in 1915 and 1916. Issues continued to circulate widely throughout the following months.

=== Ban ===
In July 1915, the Ministry of Education established an advisory committee called the Popular Education Research Association (通俗教育研究会; Tōngsú jiàoyù yánjiū huì). Among other duties, the committee supervised the published material which circulated around the general public. The writer Zhou Shuren (better known as Lu Xun) chaired a subcommittee of the association focused on monitoring popular fiction from 1915 to 1916. Lu established a classification system which sorted works into upper, middle, and lower ranks based on their usefulness to popular education. It sought to promote upper-rank works and limit or ban the publication of lower-rank works. The subcommittee frequently discussed four magazines that occupied the lower rank and which it considered especially problematic: Eyebrow Talk, The Pastime (遊戲雜誌; Yóuxì zázhì), Enticing Magazine (香艷雜誌; Xiāngyàn zázhì), and Comical Magazine (滑稽雜誌; Huájī zázhì).

A common topic of discussion among the committee, and a priority for censorship, was stemming the flow of "sexual corruption". Works which depicted promiscuous women were especially targeted; works with mentions of women in the title were more likely to be analyzed by the committee. Lu resigned from the committee in 1916, but his classification schema remained in use. At an August 1916 meeting, the fiction subcommittee unanimously agreed to ban Eyebrow Talk, considering it a much higher priority to censor than the other magazines that were perceived as problematic. In early September, several months after its final issue, the subcommittee and the Ministry of Education called on the Ministry of the Interior to ban the publication, as it featured sexually charged content and nude depictions of women. It was the first Chinese magazine to be banned on obscenity charges.

This association, in examining a magazine called Eyebrow Talk, has found that its language and topics seem specifically aimed at destroying moral barriers and harming social standards. Among all fiction magazines, its errors are the gravest. We have found that this magazine continues to be published; therefore measures must be taken for it to be banned. [...] Examination shows that the fiction and images carried by Eyebrow Talk are largely of an obscene nature and of ridiculous intention. They seem unaware of respect for human dignity. If this sort of fashion were to spread, it would do considerable harm to social morality.

— Ministry of Education, request to the Ministry of the Interior, 7 September 1916

The Ministry of the Interior banned Eyebrow Talk on 25 September 1916, promulgating the ban order through provincial gazettes. By 1917, the New Learning Society had published seven issues of a new magazine, entitled Shuoye (說腋; 'speaking of the armpit'), edited by Xu. Printed as a book, the periodical reprinted large amounts of text from Eyebrow Talk. The Popular Education Research Association banned the magazine in 1917; it was the only periodical to be banned that year. By March of that year, a book called Chenghen was found to consist mainly of reprints of serialized stories from Eyebrow Talk. The fiction committee debated on whether to ban these, and came to the consensus that stories contained within it should not be automatically banned, as the magazine had been banned for its "editorial principles".

Following the bans, Gao worked on a compilation of information about domestic skills. She and Xu published other periodicals of a similar style to Eyebrow Talk during the 1920s and 1930s; none of these were banned, although some were regarded with suspicion by other magazine writers.

== Content ==
During its run, Eyebrow Talk featured 154 short stories and 14 novels. Of these, 18 short stories and two novels were written from a first-person female perspective, a shift away from a traditional male-centered writing style. Unlike contemporary romance stories, many of the romances published in Eyebrow Talk feature stories centered around the desires of their female protagonists. One story by Ma Simei, "The Embroidered Shoe is Barely Half-Bent" (繡鞋兒剛半折; Xiùxié er gāng bàn zhé) centers on the life of a woman named Meilei, whose husband is drafted for military service. She evades the many attempts by others to separate them, and is shot dead while attempting to reunite with her husband during a battle. A story by Xie Youyun (謝幼韞), "The Next Life Is Unknown, This Life Is Over" (他生未卜此生休; Tā shēng wèibǔ cǐshēng xiū) depicts a romance between a man named Lu Sheng and a young woman named Wanxian. Wanxian is deceived and set to be married to an old man. The old man captures and kills Lu, before cooking his flesh. While Wanxian and the old man are eating Lu, she grabs a pair of scissors and stabs the old man to death.

The female-authored romances frequently featured love triangles where multiple men vied for the affection of a woman. The men in these stories were depicted as very devoted and faithful, even when the female protagonists were not faithful to them. However, during scenes of physical intimacy, women were depicted invariably as passive receivers of their male partners' affections, reflecting traditional patriarchal norms.

The magazine also contained stories and photographs depicting affection and intimacy between women. In The Emerging Lesbian Tze-Lan D. Sang writes how one particular photo captioned "Waiting for the Moon" from the first issue popped out as unique. In it, two women in fancy clothing are close together and chatting privately, one sits on the other's lap and is being held around the waist. While the magazine does not directly present this as a romantic relationship, Sang states the pose "...exceeds a common level of intimacy that can be comfortably shown in public."

Gao and Xu depicted themselves as a close and romantic couple throughout Eyebrow Talk and their later periodicals. They shared relatively reserved photos of themselves holding hands and standing together in the first two issues. In the fourth issue, Xu published ten "new love letters" where he passionately expresses his love for her and sorrow that he has to spend time apart from her. In one of the letters, he discusses their background as first cousins and states that they "promised to grow old together" as children. A short story by another female writer, Liu Peiyu, views their house from the perspective of Gao's pet dog Xuebi, who witnesses Xu tiptoeing into her bedroom at night and secretly measuring Gao's feet with his hand; holding feet in such a manner is a frequent motif in Chinese erotica, lending the story an expressively sensual tone.

=== Illustrations ===
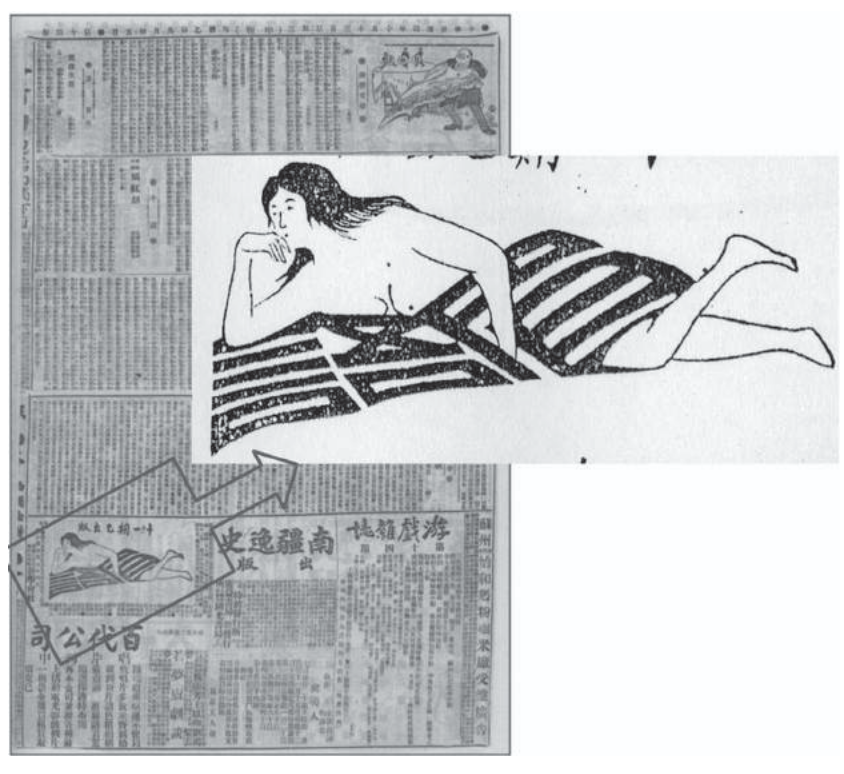
Advertisement for Eyebrow Talk in Shen Bao

Eyebrow Talk, like other Chinese magazines of the period, began its issues with several pages of pictures and photographs. In stark contrast to other literary magazines, it often included sexually charged photographs and paintings of nude or semi-nude women. Some of these were sourced from French postcards (Western postcards featuring erotic imagery). It avoided explicit pornography: when women are depicted fully nude, genitals are always depicted covered or obstructed by another object in the scene, and the text within the magazine only alluded to sexual acts through innuendo. Suggestive material was also incorporated into its advertisements for the magazine; one ad ran in Shen Bao in October 1915 includes a cartoon of a nude woman with one breast exposed, and the rest of her torso covered by the magazine's name. In announcements on the inside cover of the second and third issues, Gao calls for both writing submissions from women and pictures of women, writing that "cultured gentlemen" (風雅君子; Fēngyǎ jūnzǐ) will enjoy seeing so many photos of women in the magazine.

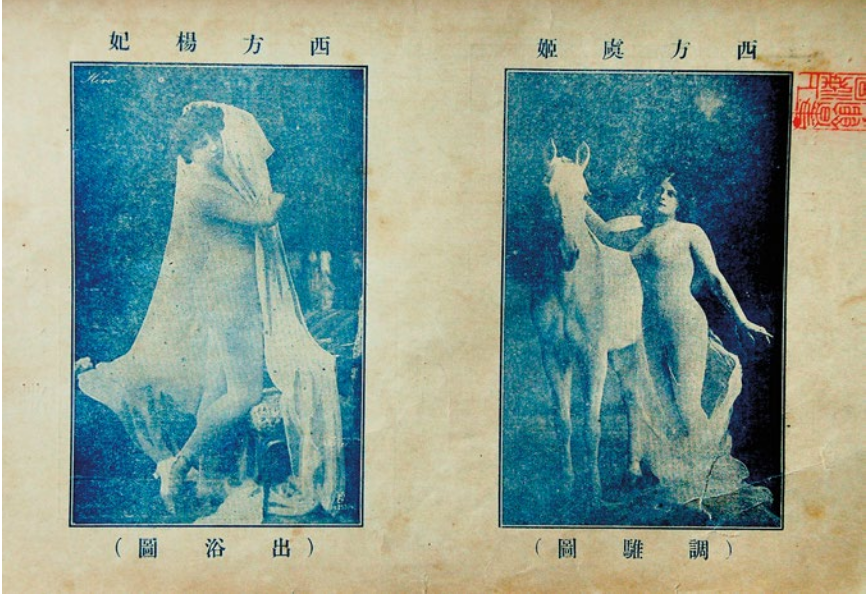
French postcards published in the first issue of Eyebrow Talk

Many of the photos and postcards in the magazine are Western postcards showing romantic couples engaged in various activities. The third issue included a photo of a Western couple sitting at a table and smoking together, captioned "Treating Each Other with Respect". They are sometimes juxtaposed with Chinese photos of a similar subject matter. Several photos show Xu posed with cross-dressing male Xinju (新劇; 'new drama') actors. Xinju, a movement which advocated for reforms to Chinese drama such as the inclusion of both male and female actors, is a frequent topic of discussion within the magazine. Other photo series included within the magazine capture the scenes of everyday life for Chinese women.

The magazine characteristically juxtaposes images with poetry and prose fiction, often recalling images from different sections of the work or previous issues; every line of one poem in the seventh issue recalls an image featured at the front of the fifth issue. Themes of romance and nudity common in the provided images are also used in the short stories, including one by Gao Jianhua, which incorporates the theme of nudity into a critique of male ownership of women. Bathing is another commonly used motif throughout poems, prose, and photos within the magazine, sometimes with references to the Tang concubine Yang Guifei, who is often depicted leaving a bath. Eight stories published within the magazine are adaptations of foreign works (albeit not indicated as such); many of the female editors had received education in foreign languages.

=== Covers ===
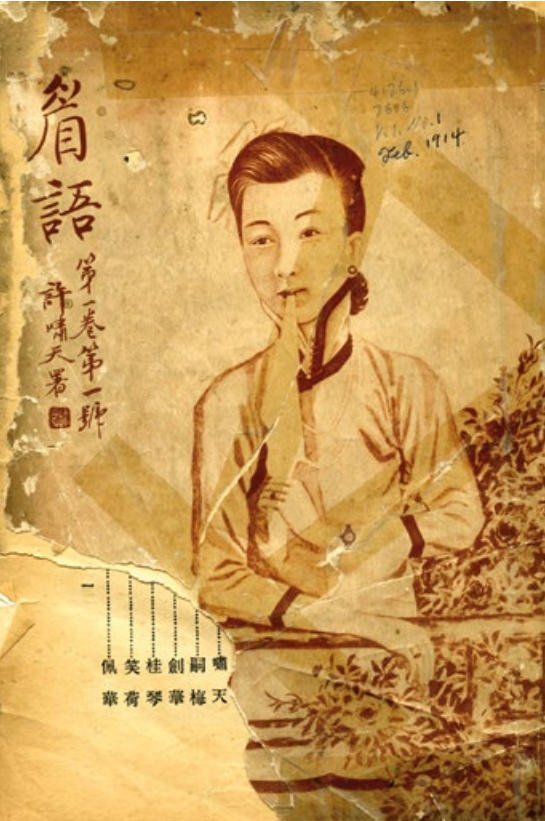
A damaged copy of the fourth print run of the first issue of Eyebrow Talk, showing the alternate cover

Some issues of Eyebrow Talk featured female nudity on their covers. The early print runs of the first issue of Eyebrow Talk feature a painting by artist Zheng Mantuo on their cover, labeled in the table of contents as An Unblemished Woman's Body (清白女兒身; Qīngbái nǚ'ér shēn). The cover depicts a young woman with an arm raised behind her head. Her body is partially covered by translucent fabric, but with one of her breasts left exposed. The following two print runs of the issue, published in late 1914, feature the same painting with only minor modifications to the titling. In January 1915, the Ministry of Education issued a document entitled "We Urge Writers and Publishers to Pay Attention to Culture" (勸告著作出版界宜注意文化; Quàngào zhùzuò chūbǎn jiè yí zhùyì wénhuà), which features an expansive critique of the publishing industry, with a specific mention of fiction magazines which feature nudity and "offend the public decency".

Following this, many Eyebrow Talk issues were released with censored covers for further print runs. The fourth print run of the first issue, made in April 1915, features a completely different cover, with a clothed woman leaning on a railing and biting into the corner of a handkerchief. Despite the change, the work still bears the same name in the table of contents. Other early issues of Eyebrow Talk made similar changes; both the second and third issues initially featured partially nude women, but swapped them in later print runs for fully clothed women.

== Reception and legacy ==
Eyebrow Talk's intellectual detractors saw it as promoting a libertine outlook in search of profit, without considering social ramifications among the public. In a 1931 essay criticizing Shanghai commercial culture, Lu Xun criticized the "Mandarin duck and butterfly" school of writing (a genre of popular romantic fiction) and named Eyebrow Talk as one of its first examples, writing "Although Eyebrow Talk was later banned, the power [of this style] did not wane at all." Eyebrow Talk's ban alongside Lu's elevated status in the literary canon in Communist China prevented much scholarly research into either the magazine or the genre during the Mao era. The magazine was often regarded as morally dubious and not as a serious literary journal in Chinese-language scholarship before the 2000s, although some studies have been made of it since. Hockx, analyzing the magazine in 2018, noted that it shares themes (such as artistic use of nudity and discussions on the position of women) with Lu's work and the literature of the New Culture Movement; he theorizes that its potential for mass-market appeal led to greater suspicion, while New Culture periodicals were restricted to a much smaller group of intellectuals.

A poor-quality reprint of Eyebrow Talk was printed in 2006, based on holdings at the Chongqing Library. Many of the nude paintings in this edition are barely visible, and the less provocative versions of the variant covers are used. In 2017, the Shanghai Library published a higher-quality online version of the periodical as part of its database of Republican era periodicals.
