= Chen Kun =

Chinese actor, singer and producer

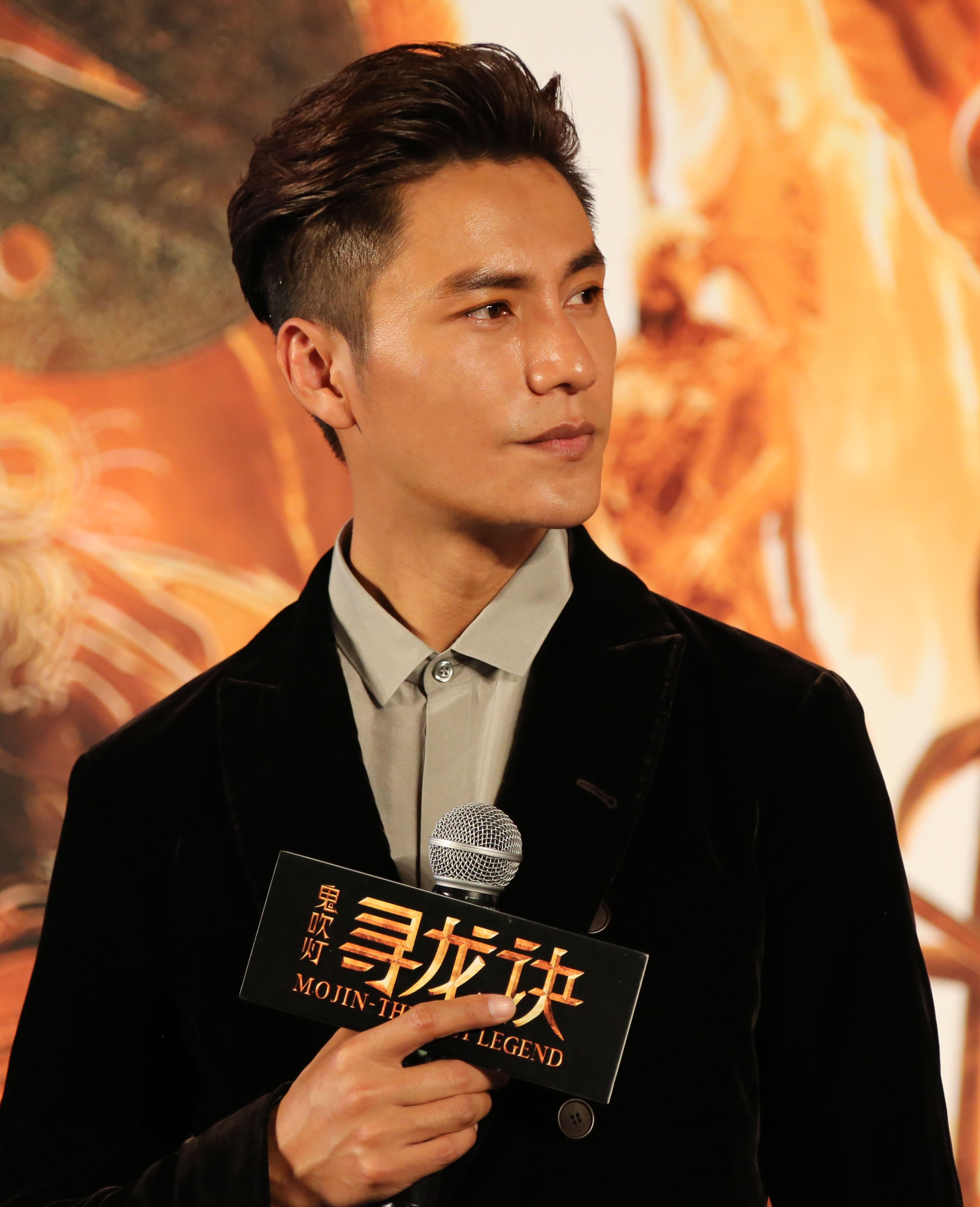
- Chen at Mojin: The Lost Legend Beijing premier on December 18, 2015
- Born: February 4, 1976 (age 50); Chongqing, China
- Education: Beijing Film Academy
- Occupations: Actor; singer; producer
- Years active: 1999–present
- Children: 1
- Musical career
- Also known as: Aloys Chen
- Genre: Mandopop
- Label: K Pictures

Chinese name
- Traditional Chinese: 陳坤
- Simplified Chinese: 陈坤
Transcriptions
Standard Mandarin
- Hanyu Pinyin: Chén Kūn
Yue: Cantonese
- Jyutping: Can4 Kwan1

Chen Kun (Chinese: 陈坤; born February 4, 1976), sometimes credited as Aloys Chen, is a Chinese actor, singer and producer. He rose to fame for the television series Love Story in Shanghai (2001) and The Story of a Noble Family (2003). He gained critical acclaim for the films The Knot (2006) and Painted Skin (2008). His other notable works include films Flying Swords of Dragon Gate (2011), Mojin: The Lost Legend (2015) and Chongqing Hot Pot (2016), as well as television series The Rise of Phoenixes (2018) and The Wind Blows From Longxi (2022).

Chen has won the Hundred Flowers Award for Best Actor, Huabiao Award for Outstanding Actor, and received a Golden Horse Award nomination for Best Actor. He ranked 68th on Forbes China Celebrity 100 list in 2014, 28th in 2014, 15th in 2017, and 52nd in 2019.

== Biography ==
=== Early life ===
Chen Kun was born in Chongqing. He was raised by his maternal grandmother before reuniting with his mother at 11. His parents divorced soon after Chen's second younger brother was born, and Chen began working part-time in high school to support his mother. He started as a typist at the municipal office and later as a solo singer at night clubs. He showed early talent in singing and was strongly recommended by his vocal trainer and mentor to join the China Oriental Song and Dance Ensemble (now China National Song and Dance Ensemble) in Beijing in 1995. In 1996, he was admitted to the Beijing Film Academy, where he majored in acting.

=== Acting ===
==== 1999–2004: Debut and rising popularity ====
Chen debuted in the 1999 film The National Anthem. He rose to prominence with a series of hit television dramas Love in Shanghai (2001), Pink Ladies (2002) and The Story of a Noble Family (2003), the last of which was adapted from the novel of the same name by Zhang Henshui.

Chen gained international recognition in 2002, after starring in Franco-Chinese romance film Balzac and the Little Chinese Seamstress, which was nominated for Golden Globe Award for Best Foreign Language Film.

==== 2005–2016: Films and acclaim ====
Chen then starred in A West Lake Moment (2005), playing a love-seeking and idealistic young man who is not easily satisfied. He was nominated as Best Actor for his performance at the Golden Horse Awards. He next starred in The Music Box (2006), which earned him the Best Actor accolade at the Shanghai Film Critics Awards for capturing his screen character's years of arduous life and as well as his struggles and joys.

Chen rose to international prominence with The Knot (2007). He described the role as a "big challenge" to him, as he had to portray the maturing process of his character over 20 years. The film was a huge success and garnered 8 nominations at the 16th Golden Rooster Awards, including Best Actor for Chen. He also won Best Actor at the 2007 Huabiao Film Awards. He next starred in Gordon Chan's horror-adventure film Painted Skin (2008), which won him the Best Actor award at the Hundred Flowers Awards.

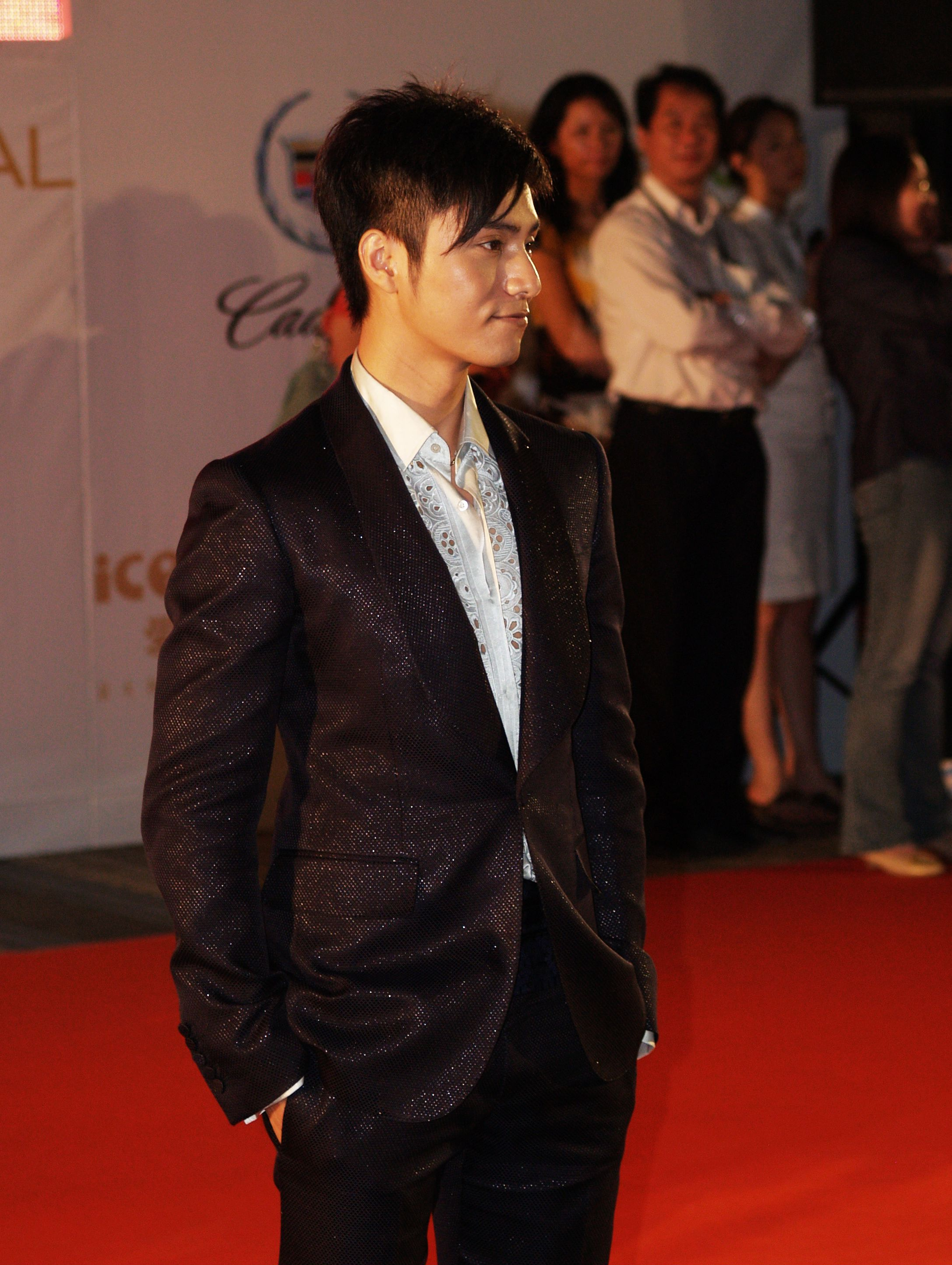
Chen at the 2007 Shanghai International Film Festival

To commemorate the 60th anniversary of the founding of the People's Republic of China, Chen participated in the patriotic tribute The Founding of a Republic (2009). He played Chiang Ching-kuo, and was praised by the media and critics alike for his excellent portrayal of a passionate nationalist who was unable to prevent the fall of his party. He then played his first antagonist role in Jiang Wen's gangster film Let the Bullets Fly (2010). In 2010, Chen established his own agency K Pictures (Dongshen Tonghua).

Chen starred in wuxia film Flying Swords of Dragon Gate directed by Tsui Hark in 2011. His dynamic portrayal of two distinct characters; the cold and cruel Yu Huatian and the witty and humorous Feng Lidao, won him Best Actor nominations at the Asian Film Awards and Hundred Flowers Awards. The dual roles marked a turning point in Chen's popularity and acting career, and has become one of his most representative works to date.

Chen played the role of Qian Xuesen in the biopic of the author released in 2012. He received critical acclaim for his capturing his character's growth from young to old, and was awarded the Best Actor award at the Shanghai Film Critics Awards for the second time. The same year, he starred in Painted Skin: The Resurrection, the sequel to Painted Skin. The film grossed over 700 million yuan ($109.8 million), becoming the highest-grossing Chinese-language movie of all time then.

Chen then starred in Bends, which was screened in the Un Certain Regard section at the 2013 Cannes Film Festival. Chen won the Best Actor award at the 2013 International du Film de Femmes de Sale held in Morocco. Chen was crowned as the "Weibo King" at the 2013 Sina Weibo Night for his popularity on the micro-blogging site.

Chen starred in fantasy epics in 2015; Zhong Kui: Snow Girl and the Dark Crystal as well as Mojin: The Lost Legend where he played Hu Bayi, the main character of the popular tomb-raiding novel series. Mojin was a huge commercial success, breaking the box office record for a local language IMAX film in China.

In 2016, Chen starred alongside Bai Baihe in crime caper film Chongqing Hot Pot. The film received acclaim and positive word-of-mouth, grossing 152 million yuan in four days. He also made a special appearance in the romantic comedy Beautiful Accident opposite his Rest on Your Shoulder co-star Gwei Lun-mei. The same year, Chen co-produced and starred in his first television variety Twenty Four Hours. The first episode was broadcast on January 21 on Zhejiang Television and ranked first in ratings.

==== 2017–present: Return to television ====
In 2018, Chen starred in the period spy drama Lost in 1949 (also known as The Double, 脱身) as twin brothers from First Cuts Features' CEO and show runner Tang XiRu (唐郗汝) and Wang QiNan (汪启楠). He also starred in the costume drama The Rise of Phoenixes as a calculating and ambitious royal prince. These two dramas, co-produced by Chen, marked his return to the small screen after a decade, only to mixed reviews and low ratings. He also starred in fantasy film The Yinyang Master (2021), adapted from the Onmyoji (game).

In 2021, he was selected as jury member at 11th Beijing International Film Festival for Tiantan Awards.

=== Music ===
Apart from acting, Chen is also an established singer. He frequently performs theme songs for his television series and has released three full-length studio albums. Chen made his debut as a singer in 2004 with the album Osmosis. He then released his second album Make It Come True Again, winning him Most Popular Male Vocalist at the MTV Asia Awards. To promote his third album Mystery&Me, he held his first solo concert in Beijing in February 2010. He wrote the lyrics to the single "Power to Go", which he released for a philanthropy program to advocate environmental awareness and protection.

=== Others ===
Since 2011, Chen set up a series of public charities named "Power to Go", aimed to encourage people to simply go outside and walk, in an effort to improve their health and spirit. The events were held on separate occasions in Qinghai and Tibet.

Chen is also a keen writer, having published and co-authored several books. His first book Suddenly Walked to Tibet (突然就走到了西藏) was published in 2011, and contains a collection of autobiographical essays. It was a huge commercial success, and Chen became the first and only actor to make it on to China's Writers Rich List. In 2012, he co-authored the book Heading East, in the Direction of Peace (往西，宁静的方向), the first in a series of five books promoting the charity program. In 2014, he published Strange Aquarius (鬼水瓶录), a short-story collection that takes inspiration from his Weibo posts and life story.

== Endorsements ==
In 2012, Chen Kun's wax figure entered the Madame Tussauds Museum in Shanghai and became the second wax figure of a famous Chinese actor in the museum's collection. He has also been designated as China's Goodwill Ambassador by UNICEF.

In 2014, he became the product ambassador of Huawei's honorary brand in China.

In 2015, Chen became the global ambassador of the Giorgio Armani brand and the luxury watch brand Baume & Mercier.

In 2017, he became the spokesperson for the skin care brand Fresh in China and the brand spokesperson for Motorola's new flagship mobile phone moto in 2018.

== Personal life ==
Chen disclosed in his autobiography that he suffered from depression between 2003 and 2007.

While Chen has never had a public relationship, he mentioned on The Jin Xing Show that he had a girlfriend when he was 16 or 17 years old, describing it as a situation where "she loved me, but I didn't love her very much." He also mentioned an earlier, "undeveloped" first love.

Chen is unmarried but has a son, Chen Zunyou (Alex Chen), nicknamed Youyou, born in 2002. The birth mother's identity remains unknown. The earliest mention of Chen's son appeared in a Yangtze Evening Post report in October 2003, which stated that "Chen Kun adopted an abandoned child." In 2007, Southern Metropolis Weekly published a report titled "Neighbors Reveal: Chen Kun Has a Five-Year-Old Illegitimate Son Nicknamed 'Youyou'," after which the speculation that the child was Chen's biological son intensified. Chen's uncle instead said, "The child should be Chen Kun's younger brother's. At that time, Chen Yu (Chen Kun's younger brother) was not yet married, but he had a child and no job. Chen Kun has a very good relationship with his younger brother, so he adopted the child."

== Filmography ==
=== Film ===
Year	English title	Chinese title	Role	Notes
1999	The National Anthem	国歌	Nie Er	
2002	Balzac and the Little Chinese Seamstress	巴尔扎克和小裁缝	Luo Ming	
2003	Kung Fu Girls	中国功夫少女组	Tang Zheng	Special appearance
2004	Baober in Love	恋爱中的宝贝	Mao Mao	Guest appearance
2005	A West Lake Moment	鸳鸯蝴蝶	Ah Qin	
2006	The Music Box	理发师	Lu Ping	
2006	The Knot	云水谣	Chen Qiushui	
2007	The Door	门	Jiang Zhongtian	
2008	Playboy Cops	花花型警	Lincoln Lin	
2008	Painted Skin	画皮	Wang Sheng	
2009	Mulan	花木兰	Wentai	
2009	The Founding of a Republic	建国大业	Chiang Ching-kuo	
2010	My Ex-wife's Wedding	跟我的前妻谈恋爱	Ma Yong	
2010	Let the Bullets Fly	让子弹飞	Hu Wan	
2011	The Founding of a Party	建党伟业	Zhou Enlai	
2011	Rest on Your Shoulder	肩上蝶	Yan Guo	
2011	Love on Credit	幸福额度	Zhang Quan	co-producer
2011	Flying Swords of Dragon Gate	龙门飞甲	Yu Huatian / Wind Blade (Feng Li Dao)	
2012	Hsue-shen Tsien	钱学森	Qian Xuesen	
2012	Painted Skin: The Resurrection	画皮II	General Huo Xin	
2013	Young Detective Dee: Rise of the Sea Dragon	狄仁杰之神都龙王	Wang Bo	Guest appearance
2014	Bends	过界男女	Huang Zihui	
2015	Zhong Kui: Snow Girl and the Dark Crystal	钟馗伏魔：雪妖魔灵2	Zhong Kui	
2015	Mojin: The Lost Legend	寻龙诀	Hu Bayi	
2016	Chongqing Hot Pot	火锅英雄	Liu Bo	
2017	Beautiful Accident	美好的意外	Zhang Tao / Zi Jun	Special appearance, Executive Producer
2021	The Yinyang Master	侍神令	Qing Ming	
TBA	The Weary Poet	诗眼倦天涯	Ye Motian	
TBA	Fengshen Trilogy	封神三部曲	Yuanshi Reverend	

=== Television series ===
Year	English title	Chinese title	Role	Notes
2001	Love Story in Shanghai	像雾像雨又像风	Chen Zikun	
2001	Pink Ladies	粉红女郎	Romeo	Guest appearance
2001	Traveller Story	旅人的故事	Fang	
2001	Love in Sunshine	爱在阳光灿烂时	Ouyang Jun	
2002	Only You	非你不可	Ke Lei	
2002	The Noble Family	买办之家	Yu Zikun	Guest appearance
2003	The Story of a Noble Family	金粉世家	Jin Yanxi	
2003	Farewell Vancouver	别了，温哥华	Luo Yi	
2003	Red Carpet, Black Dream	红色地毯黑色梦	Lan Hao	
2003	Shuang Xiang Pao	双响炮	Xu Heng	Guest appearance
2004	Ming Yang Hua Gu	名扬花鼓	Mingyang	
2004	Chinese Story	中国故事	Xiaodong	segment: Brother's Story (哥们的故事)
2004	Yearning of the Sword	长剑相思	Yan Zhuiyun	
2005	True Love on Earth	天地真情	Lin Shijie	Guest appearance
2005	Eager for True Love	渴望真爱	Hu An	segment: Absolute Privacy (绝对隐私)
2005	Wind and Rain in Xiguan	风雨西关	Liang Jinkun	
2005	Hero of the Year	好想好想谈恋爱	Lu Kun	Guest appearance
2006	The Conquest	争霸传奇	Fan Li	
2007	Zhu's Family Garden	朱家花园	Li Bowen	
2008	Love will be our Witness	情证今生	Zhou Hao	
2008	C'est La Vie, Mon Chéri	新不了情	Cheung Siu-kit	
2008	Remembrance of Dreams Past	故梦	Lu Tian'en	
2018	Lost in 1949 (also known as The Double)	脱身	Qiao Zhicai / Qiao Lijie	co-producer
2018	The Rise of Phoenixes	天盛长歌	Ning Yi	co-producer
2021	Dream of a Salesman	输赢	Zhou Yue	
2022	The Wind Blows From Longxi	风起陇西	Chen Gong	

== Discography ==
Albums
Year	English title	Chinese title	Notes
2004	Osmosis	渗透	EP
2006	Make It Come True Again	再一次实现	
2009	Mystery & Me	谜ME	

Singles
Year	English title	Chinese title	Album	Notes
2005	"Forgetting"	忘却	Feng Yu Xi Guan OST	
2006	"Conquest"	争霸	The Conquest OST	
2006	"It's Really Forever"	真永远	The Conquest OST	
2007	"Always Together, Never Leaving"	相随相依永不分离	Zhu Jia Hua Yuan OST	
2008	"Beijing Welcomes You"	北京欢迎你	—N/a	2008 Summer Olympics theme song
2011	"Power to Go"	—N/a	—N/a	Power to Go theme song
2011	"Promise of Love"	幸福宣言	Love on Credit OST	
2016	"Looking for the Dragon Spell"	寻龙诀	Mojin: The Lost Legend OST	

== Endorsements and ambassadorship ==
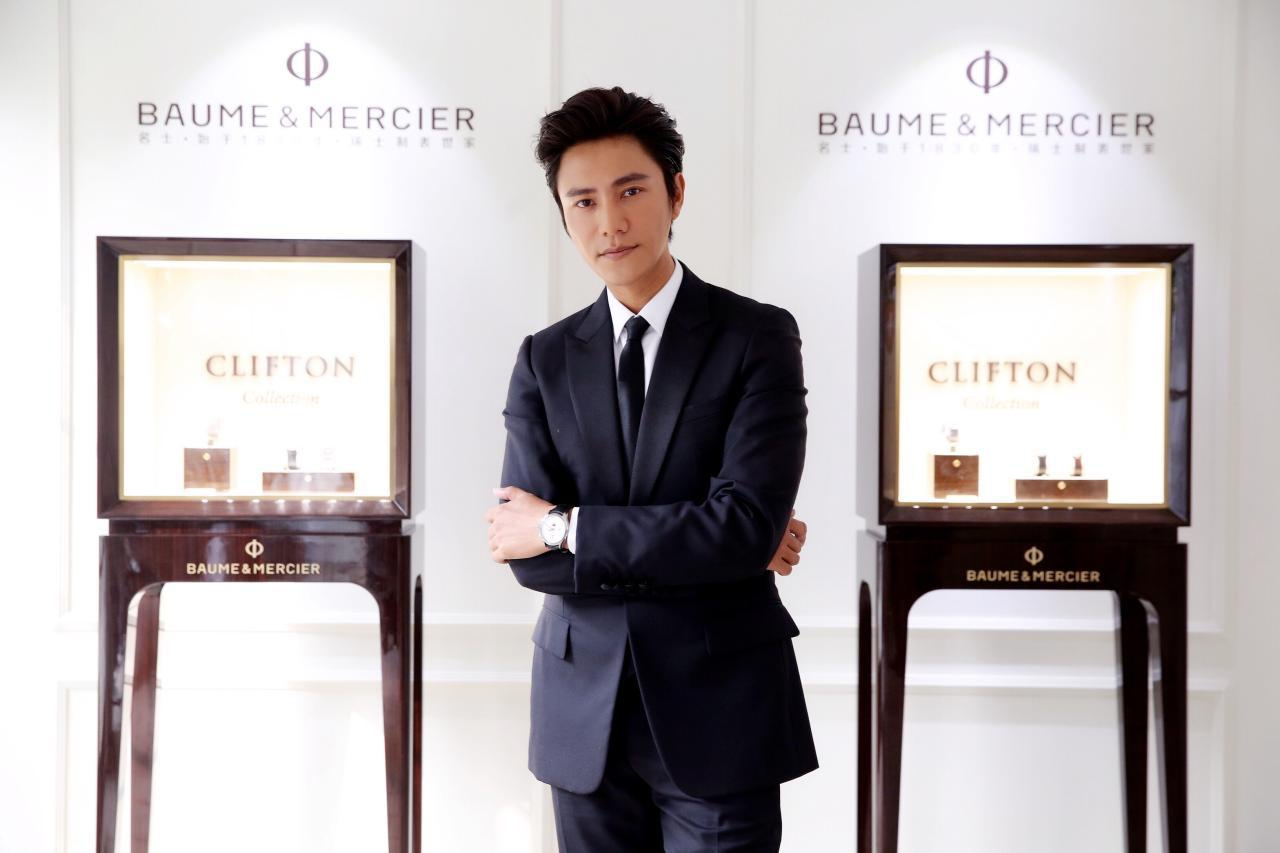
Chen at Baume et Mercier event in Beijing (October 12, 2016).

Chen was appointed as one of the goodwill ambassadors for China-ROK Exchange Year in 2007. He was also appointed as UNICEF Ambassador for China.

In 2012, Chen became the second Chinese male celebrity to have a wax figure of himself displayed at Madam Tussaud in Shanghai.

In 2014, he became the product ambassador of Huawei's Honor brand in China.

In 2015, Chen became the global ambassador of Giorgio Armani and luxury watch brand Baume et Mercier.

In 2023, he was named as Burberry's global brand ambassador, with his appointment marking a milestone for the brand in the Chinese market.
