= Mandarin Ducks and Butterflies =

Early 20th century Chinese literary genre

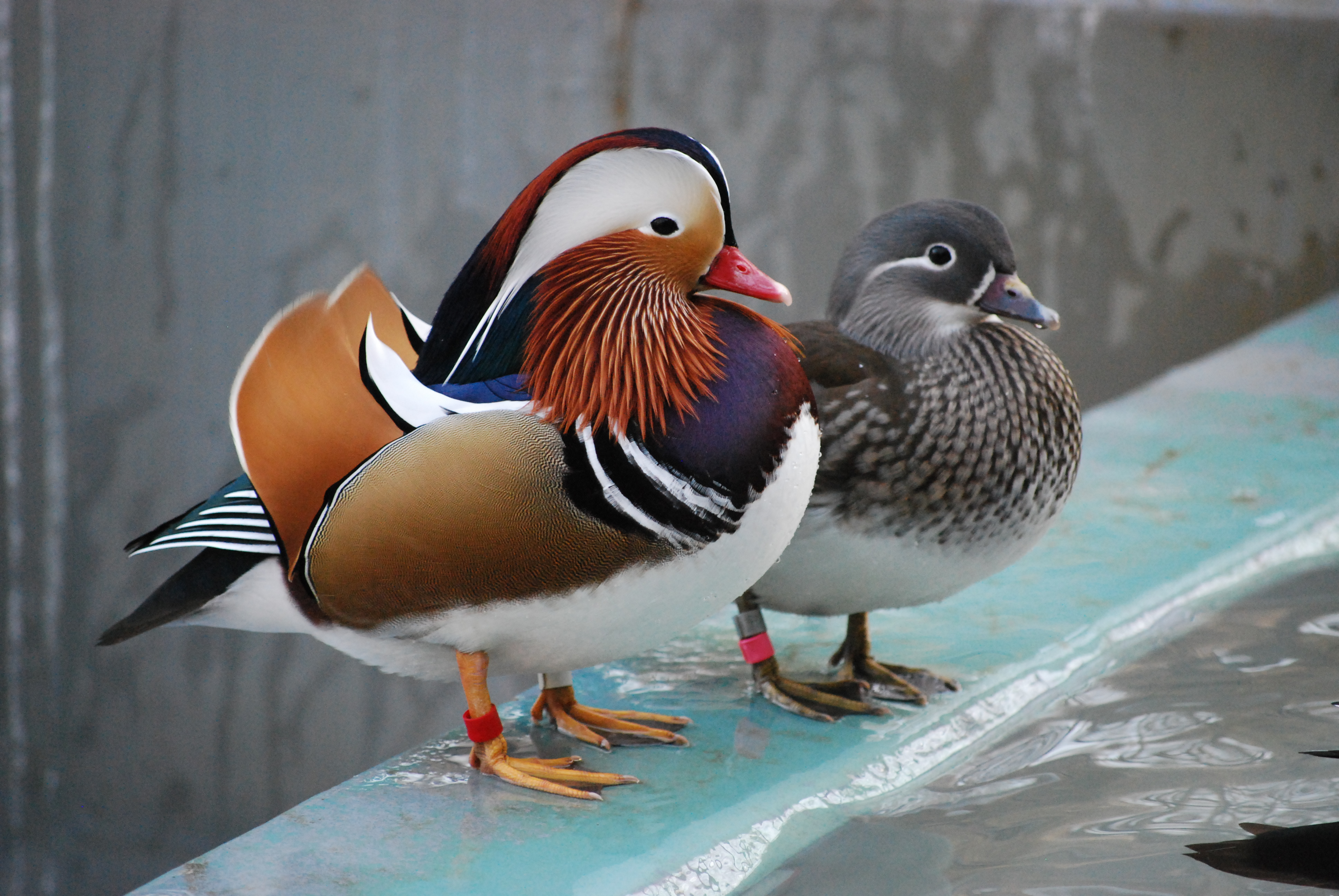
Mandarin ducks are a traditional symbol of romance because they mate for life.

The Mandarin Ducks and Butterflies school (Chinese: 鴛鴦蝴蝶派; pinyin: yuānyāng húdié pài), also called Butterflies fiction, was a popular genre of Chinese fiction in the first half of the 20th century, especially in the 1910s and 1920s.

Mandarin ducks (which are frequently seen in pairs) and butterflies (from Butterfly Lovers) are traditional symbols of romantic love, but the genre encompassed more than romance stories: scandals and "high crimes" were also favorite subjects. Mandarin Ducks and Butterflies stories were disparaged by progressive writers of the May Fourth Movement and the New Culture Movement for their escapist content and promotion of conservative values. The genre gradually fell out of favor following Japanese invasions in the 1930s.

== History ==
Cover of a 19th-century Qing-dynasty novel, Huayue Hen (花月痕; The Traces of the Flowers and the Moon), written by Wei Xiuren; such novels had a direct impact on modern Chinese romantic fiction.

Cover of Xu Zhenya's Jade Pear Spirit (玉梨魂) (1912)

Cover of Qin Shou'ou's Qiu Haitang (Begonia 秋海棠) (1941), also considered by some to be part of the Butterflies school

The Mandarin Ducks and Butterflies school of fiction, also called "Butterflies fiction", has its roots in the mass printed romantic novels from the Ming and Qing dynasties called caizi jiaren ('scholar-beauty'; 才子佳人), which had become extremely popular since the 17th century. This genre featured forbidden loves, handsome male scholars, virtuous beautiful women, and often expressed Confucian themes. In the 1910s, after the fall of the Qing dynasty, Butterflies fiction developed as a category of romantic tragedy and crime drama fiction reflecting traditional values. A key early example of Butterflies fiction was the 1912 novel Jade Pear Spirit (玉梨魂) by Xu Zhenya, which tells the story of a beautiful widow carrying out an affair with her son's teacher. Due to social taboo around widows remarrying, the affair is kept a secret, and the couple never marry. The story ends with the widow dying so that the young teacher may pursue a more socially acceptable marriage, but he soon dies of grief. The story reflects themes of Confucian propriety and traditional moral values, with the protagonists choosing to die rather than break taboo. Jade Pear Spirit became one of the most printed books of Republican Chinese history.

Zhang Henshui's 1930 novel Fate in Tears and Laughter is a representative work of this school, and many critics consider Zhang's novels to be some of the most sophisticated and outstanding examples of the genre, although Zhang himself rejected labelling most of his works as being part of this school. Instead, Zhang saw his works as being part of a major early 20th-century waves of modernization of traditional Chinese fiction rather than mere sentimental entertainment without social conscience, a label he repeatedly refuted. Su Manshu's The Lone Swan captures the melancholic tones characteristic of the genre. In a 1931 essay criticizing Shanghai commercial culture, Lu Xun criticized the Mandarin Ducks and Butterflies school of writing and named the literary magazine Eyebrow Talk as one of its first examples, writing "Although Eyebrow Talk was later banned, the power [of this style] did not wane at all."

Mandarin Ducks and Butterflies fiction was widely consumed by urban readers and became especially prominent in Shanghai, which had a booming publishing industry during this time. Stories were frequently serialized in popular newspapers and magazines, contributing to the rise of mass-market fiction.

In addition to Zhang Henshui, Xu Zhenya and Su Manshu, many others, such as Zhou Shoujuan, Bao Tianxiao, Cheng Xiaoqing, Lu Shi'e, and Chen Diexian, have also been categorized by May Fourth writers as "Mandarin Ducks and Butterflies writers". The term is frequently and disparagingly used by some literary critics to refer to writers that writes "romantic" or "romance" focused fiction; for example, Eileen Chang was also labelled as a "Butterflies writer" when her 1943 debut novella Aloeswood Incense: The First Brazier was published.

Major novels by Zhang Henshui that have been considered to be part of the "Butterflies school"
Cover of Zhang Henshui's Chunming waishi (春明外史, 1924)

Cover of A Family of Distinction (volume three) (Jinfen shijia 金粉世家; 1927)

Cover of Mei Ren En (美人恩, 1930)

Cover of Sishui liunian (似水流年, 1930–1931)

Cover of Guodu shidai (過渡時代, 1933)

Cover of Qinhuai shijia (秦淮世家, 1939)

== Conflict with the May Fourth and New Culture Movements ==
Progressive thinkers of the New Culture Movement grew disillusioned with some aspects of traditional Chinese literature, especially popular romantic novels that featured "scholars" and "beauties" and other social archetypes, perceiving them as too "outdated" and as an obstacle to cultural modernization and scientific thinking. Chen Duxiu, who later co-founded the Chinese Communist Party, was a prominent critic of the values promoted by Mandarin Ducks and Butterflies literature, writing that "Loyalty, filial piety, chastity, and righteousness are a slavish morality" in his 1915 essay Call to Youth.

Modernists of the May Fourth Movement considered Butterflies fiction to be an obstacle to the modernization of Chinese culture, and mockingly coined the term "Mandarin Ducks and Butterflies" in reference to traditional symbols of love. They disparaged the genre as escapist, arguing that it failed to engage with social issues and lacked the reformative zeal that modern Chinese literature should embody. They saw it as a hindrance to the development of a more socially responsible literary tradition. As a result of these critiques and changing socio-political climates, the popularity of Mandarin Ducks and Butterflies fiction waned, particularly after the Japanese invasion in the 1930s.

Following the collapse in popularity of Butterflies literature, some writers ended their careers. Xu Zhenya, the writer of Jade Pearl Spirit, became an opium addict and died in obscurity in 1937. The magazine Fiction Monthly (小说月报) began as a Butterflies fiction publication but shifted its focus to "serious" literature featuring social realism after being taken over by Mao Dun, who later became the first Minister of Culture of the People's Republic of China. After the founding of the People's Republic of China, many writers of the Mandarin Ducks and Butterflies school were further sidelined in the literary field, although the most famous writers, such as Zhang Henshui, remained prominent, as Zhang actually served as an advisor to the Ministry of Culture after 1949 for a while and he was also a Council Member of the China Writers Association. Despite its initial popularity, Mandarin Ducks and Butterflies literature was largely marginalized in later literary histories, but it has since attracted renewed academic interest in both China and abroad for its role in reflecting the cultural anxieties and desires of early 20th-century urban Chinese society.
