= Joan Haste =

1895 novel by H. Rider Haggard

- Author: H. Rider Haggard
- Language: English
- Publication date: 1895
- Publication place: United Kingdom

Joan Haste is an 1895 novel by English writer H. Rider Haggard. Set primarily in London, it is the story of a love affair hampered by differences in social class and ending in tragedy:

After the liberal amount of "human gore" with which Mr. Haggard has bedewed the pages of most of his previous romances, 'Joan Haste' will probably strike most of his admirers as somewhat anemic.
