= Fate in Tears and Laughter =

1930 novel by Zhang Henshui

- Cover of a 1933 edition of the novel (volume 2)
- Author: Zhang Henshui
- Original title: 啼笑因緣
- Published: 1930

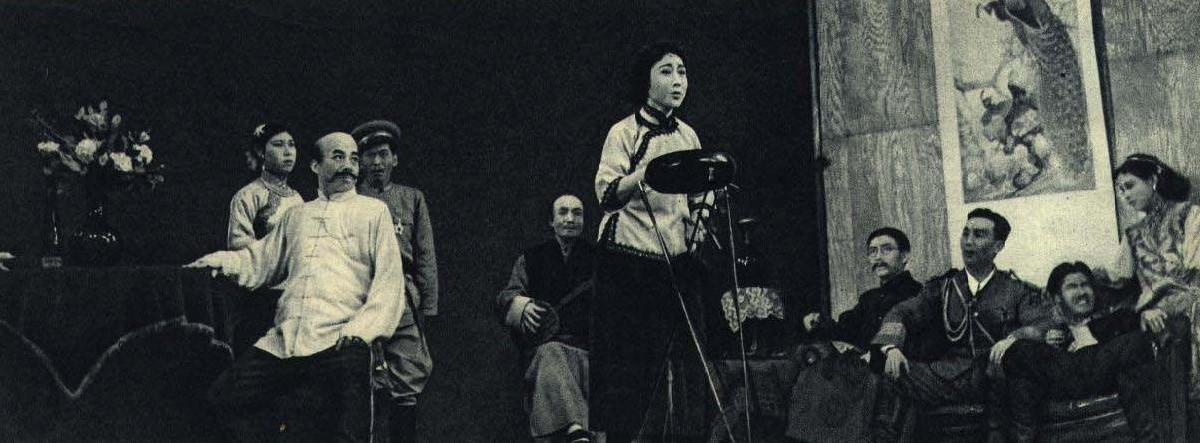
A scene from a 1962 quju (曲劇) stage adaptation of the novel

Fate in Tears and Laughter (Chinese: 啼笑因緣) is a 1930 Chinese novel by Zhang Henshui, set in 1920s Beiping (Beijing). A few chapters (Chapters 1, 2, 18, 19) were translated into English by Sally Borthwick for the anthology Chinese Middlebrow Fiction: From the Ch'ing and Early Republican Eras (1984). Qingliang Chen's new, unabridged English translation, A Fate Woven of Tears and Laughter, was released in late 2025.

The novel has been adapted into many films and TV series, as well as a number of local Chinese operas.

== Adaptations ==
=== Films ===
- Fate in Tears and Laughter (啼笑因緣), a 1932 Chinese silent film directed by Zhang Shichuan, starring Zheng Xiaoqiu, Hu Die and Yan Yuexian.
- Fate in Tears and Laughter (啼笑因緣), a 1941 Chinese film directed by Sun Jing, starring Mei Xi and Li Li-hua.
- A Tale of Laughter and Tears (啼笑因緣), a 1952 Hong Kong film directed by Yeung Kung-leung and Wan Hoi-ching, starring Cheung Wood-Yau and Pak Yin.
- Between Tears and Laughters (啼笑因緣), a 1957 Hong Kong film directed by Lee Sun-fung, starring Cheung Ying, Law Yim-hing and Kong Duen-yee.
- Between Tears and Laughter (故都春夢), a 1964 Hong Kong film directed by Lo Chen, starring Kwan Shan, Li Li-hua and Ivy Ling Po.
- A Story of Three Loves (啼笑因緣), a 1964 two-part Hong Kong film directed by Wong Tin-lam, starring Chao Lei, Jeanette Lin Tsui and Grace Chang.
- Lover's Destiny (新啼笑因緣), a 1975 Hong Kong film directed by Chor Yuen, starring Chung Hua, Ching Li and Shih Szu.

=== TV series ===
- The Fatal Irony (啼笑因緣), a 1974 Hong Kong TVB series, starring Chan Chun-wah, Louise Lee and Pearl Au Kar-wai.
- Laugh in the Sleeve (啼笑因緣), a 1987 Hong Kong Asia Television series, starring Damian Lau, Michelle Yim and Nora Miao.
- Fate in Tears and Laughter (啼笑因緣), a 1987 Chinese Tianjin Television series in Beijing Quju (曲剧), starring Wei Xikui.
- Fate in Tears and Laughter (啼笑因緣), a 1987 Chinese Nei Mongol Television series starring Sun Qixin, Wang Hui and Sun Jiaxin.
- Fate in Tears and Laughter (新啼笑因緣), a 1989 Taiwan Television series, starring Kent Tong and Fung Bo Bo.
- Fate in Tears and Laughter (啼笑因緣), a 1995 Chinese Anhui Television series in Huangmei opera, starring Zhang Gong, Zhou Li and Wang Jing.
- Fate in Tears and Laughter (啼笑因緣), a 2004 China Central Television series directed by Huang Shuqin, starring Hu Bing and Yuan Li.
