= Zhang Henshui =

Chinese novelist

- Chinese: 张恨水
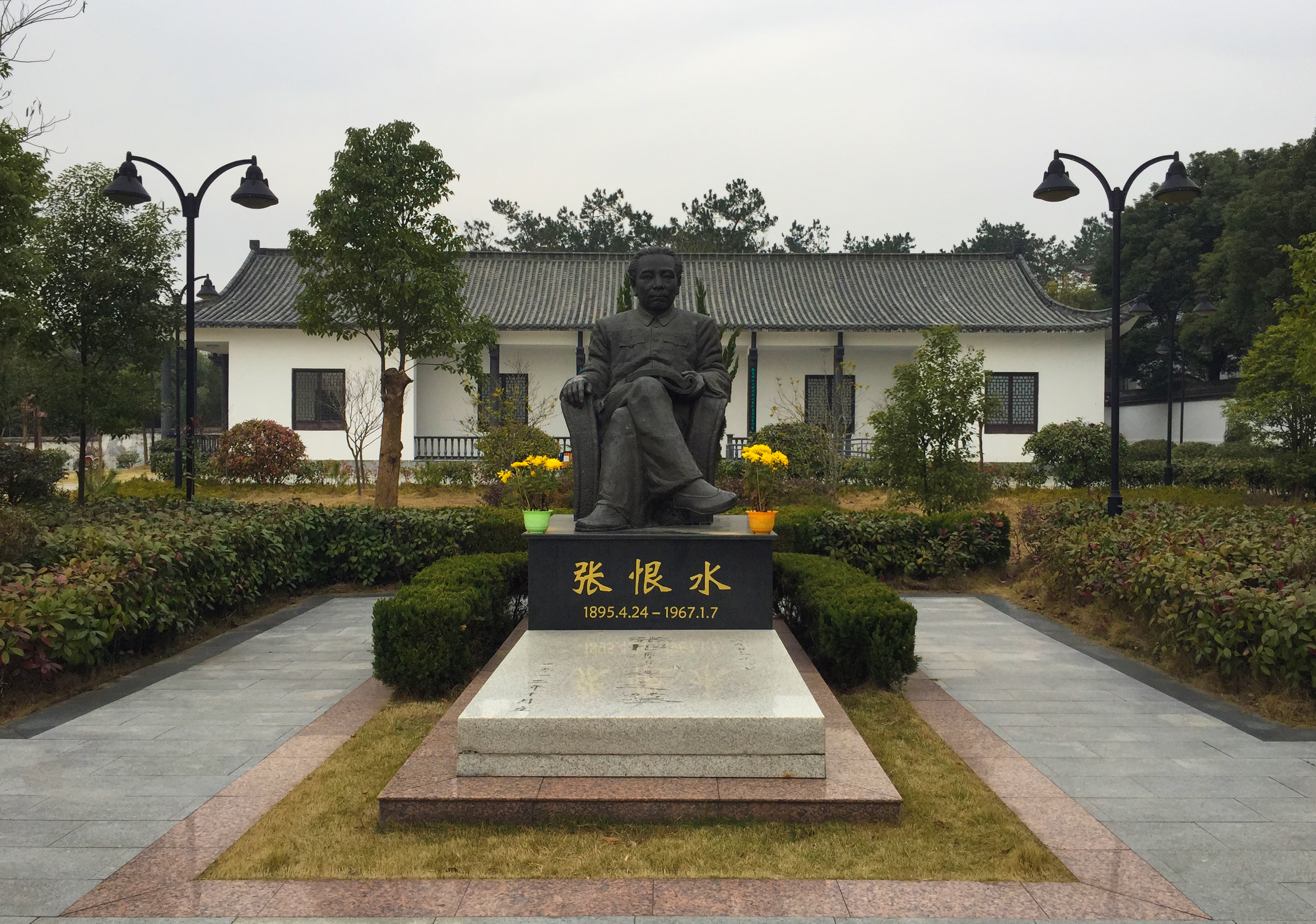
- Statue and tomb of Zhang Henshui in Qianshan County, Anqing
- Born: Zhang Xinyuan; May 18, 1895; Nanchang, Jiangxi province, Great Qing
- Died: February 15, 1967 (aged 71); Beijing, People's Republic of China
- Occupation: Writer

Zhang Henshui (Chinese: 张恨水; Wade–Giles: Chang Hen-shui; May 18, 1895 – February 15, 1967) was the pen name of Zhang Xinyuan (张心远), a popular and prolific Chinese novelist. He published more than 100 novels in his 50 years of fiction writing.

== Early life ==
On May 18, 1895, Zhang was born in Nanchang, Jiangxi province, China. In his teens, Zhang went to school in Suzhou, China. At age 16, Zhang's father died. Zhang moved to Qianshan, Anhui, his ancestral home.

== Career ==
Cover of Zhang Henshui's Shanchuang xiaopin (山窗小品; Essays from a Mountain Window), published in 1943. Though Zhang is primarily known for his novels, he has also published five essay collections throughout his career

Keen in both classical and vernacular (baihua) literatures since youth, Zhang began composing in the vein of zhanghui xiaoshuo (章回小说), novels written in vernacular Chinese but using classical Chinese poetry as chapter headings.

Zhang started his career as a member of a theatre troupe and then took up novel-writing as a hobby. In 1913, his wrote his first long-form novel Qing shan lei (青衫淚). Zhang joined the press in 1918 as an editor. Zhang became a journalist in Wuhan. In 1919, Zhang became a newspaper editor in Beijing, China. The first of his major novels serialized was A Pining Song for the Southern Country (南国相思谱, Nanguo xiangsi pu, 1919). After departing for Beijing in 1919 to work as a newspaper editor, his breakthrough work, An Unofficial History of Beijing (春明外史, Chunming Waishi), was serialized between 1924 and 1928. It was a huge success and established him as the pre-eminent popular novelist of his generation. His masterpieces A Family of Distinction (金粉世家, Jinfen shijia, 1927–32) and Fate in Tears and Laughter (啼笑因缘, Tixiao Yinyuan, 1930) were much more perspicaciously planned than his earlier books. At the height of his popularity he concurrently worked on six novels on serialization, in between his career as a press-man and editor. Zhang was a major literary celebrity of his time, and aspects of his life were frequently covered and reported by the press and tabloids in China.

The fourth of his most acclaimed works, Eighty-One Dreams (八十一梦, Bashiyi meng), was published in 1941. This work, perhaps the most representative of his 40-odd novels set during the Second Sino-Japanese War, uses parables and dream sequences to satirize the corrupt bureaucracy. Suffering a stroke in 1949, Zhang temporarily lost the ability to walk, but continued to write.

His last major novel Jizhe wai zhuan (記者外傳) was published between 1957-1958.

Zhang has written a total of three memoirs: one published in 1931 called Wo de xiaoshuo guocheng (我的小說過程; My Novel Writing Process); one published in 1949 called Xiezuo shengya huiyi (寫作生涯回憶; Memoirs of My Writing Career); he wrote his third such work, an autobiography called Wo de Shenghuo he Chuangzuo (我的生活和創作; My Life and Works) in 1963.

== Works ==
It is estimated that throughout his life, Zhang Henshui wrote a total of some 40 million Chinese characters in over 110 novels. His works emphasize realistic dialogue, often interposing people from different social strata and were thus hugely popular amongst the Chinese public throughout the 20th century.

Much of Zhang Henshui's works has yet to receive comprehensive translations in the West. Many of the most acclaimed and translated modern Chinese authors were May Fourth and progressive writers such as Lu Xun, Mao Dun, Lao She, Ba Jin, Cao Yu, Shen Congwen, Qian Zhongshu, Guo Moruo, Xiao Hong, Zhao Shuli, Yu Dafu, and Ding Ling; Zhang Henshui on the other hand, along with the likes of Jin Yong, Wang Dulu and Liang Yusheng, is regarded as a major mainstream literary titan of 20th century Chinese literature.

Selected works of Zhang Henshui in chronological order:
Chunming waishi (春明外史; An Unofficial Tale of Beijing), 1924

Jinfen shijia, (金粉世家; A Family of Distinction), 1927

Yinhan shuangxing (銀漢雙星; Pair of Stars in the Milky Way), 1930

Tixiao yinyuan (啼笑因緣; Fate in Tears and Laughter), 1930

Meiren En (美人恩; A Beauty's Gratitude), 1930

Pinghu tongche (平滬通車; Shanghai Express), 1930

Taiping Hua (太平花; The Flowers of Peace), 1931

Sishui liunian (似水流年; Flowing Years Like a River or Regrets of Times Past), 1930–1931

Luoxia guwu (落霞孤鶩; Rose-coloured Clouds), 1932

Yangliu Qingqing (楊柳青青; Green Green the Willow Trees), 1933

Guodu shidai (過渡時代; The Transitional Age), 1933

Bei Yan Nan Fei (北雁南飛; The Wild Goose Flies South), 1934

Xiandai qingnian (現代青年; Modern Youth), 1934

Zhongyuan Haoxia Zhuan (中原豪俠傳; Tales of the Knights), 1936

Man Cheng Fengyu (滿城風雨), 1936

Ru ci jiangshan (如此江山; A Land Like This), 1936

Xiangzhan zhi ye (巷戰之夜), 1938

Dajiang dong qu (大江東去; The River Flows East), 1938

Yu Jiao Zhi (玉交枝; The Jades Entwined), 1939

Cover of Qinhuai shijia (秦淮世家; The House of Qinhuai), 1939

Shu Dao Nan (蜀道難), 1939

Tianhe pei (天河配; Star-Crossed Lovers), 1939

Bashiyi meng (八十一夢; Eighty-One Dreams), 1941

Mimi gu (秘密谷; The Secret Valley), 1941

Shitou Cheng wai (石頭城外; Outside the Stone City), 1943

Hu Bi Wan Sui (虎賁萬歲), 1946

Re xue zhi hua (熱血之花; A Flower of Ardent Blood), 1946

Zhi zui jin mi (紙醉金迷; The Root of all Evil), 1946

Ao Shuang Hua (傲霜花), 1947

Ye Shen Chen (夜深沉; Deep in the Night), 1957

=== Translated works ===
- Fate in Tears and Laughter, trans. by Sally Borthwick, 1982.
- Shanghai Express: A thirties novel, trans. by William A. Lyell (Honolulu: University of Hawaii Press, 1997).
- Eighty-One Dreams, trans. by Simon Schuchat (The Chinese University of Hong Kong Press, 2025).

== Personal life ==
On February 15, 1967, Zhang died of a brain hemorrhage as he was getting out of bed in Beijing, China.

== Media adaptations ==
Many television series are based on works by Zhang. A Family of Distinction has been adapted a few times, once during the 1980s, when Hong Kong television broadcaster Television Broadcasts Limited produced the series Yesterday's Glitter, and during the 2000s, with the Mainland China television series The Story of a Noble Family.

== See also ==
- Literature of China

== Additional sources ==
- Zhang Henshui and Popular Chinese Fiction, 1919-1949 by Thomas Michael McClellan (Edwin Mellen Press, 2005)

== External sources ==
- Shanghai Express (one of the few novels of Zhang Henshui that received English-language translation)
