= Zhu Shouju =

Chinese author and filmmaker

Zhu Shouju (朱瘦菊)
- Native name: 朱瘦菊
- Born: Zhu Junbo; 1892 Shanghai, Qing Empire
- Died: December 31, 1966 (aged 74) Wuhan, Hubei, People's Republic of China
- Occupation: Novelist, film director, screenwriter
- Language: Chinese
- Spouse: Zhang Guizhen (张桂珍); Zhu Huiying (朱慧英)

Chinese name
- Chinese: 朱瘦菊
Transcriptions
Standard Mandarin
- Hanyu Pinyin: Zhū Shoùjú

Original Chinese name
- Chinese: 朱俊伯
Transcriptions
Standard Mandarin
- Hanyu Pinyin: Zhū Jùnbó

Haishang Shuomengren
- Traditional Chinese: 海上說夢人
- Simplified Chinese: 海上说梦人
- Literal meaning: Dream-Teller of the Sea (Shanghai)
Transcriptions
Standard Mandarin
- Hanyu Pinyin: Hǎi Shàng Shuō Mèng Rén

Zhu Shouju (1892 – 31 December 1966), born Zhu Junbo, also known by his pen name Haishang Shuomengren or "Shanghai Dream Narrator", was a Chinese author and filmmaker based in Shanghai.

He began his career as a writer of serialized novels. In 1924 he became the chief editor of Movie Magazine (電影雜誌) and in the same year founded the Lilium Pictures Company (百合影片公司). In 1925, it merged with another film company to become the Great China Lilium Pictures Company (大中華百合影片公司), with Zhu serving as its general manager. Zhu directed at least 15 films in the 1920s, including at least 3 starring Ruan Lingyu, who later became a superstar. The majority of his films have been lost, but his 1925 film The Stormy Night was accidentally re-discovered in Tokyo, Japan in the 21st century.

== Works translated into English ==
Year	Chinese title	Translated English title	Translator
1921	歇浦潮	The Shanghai Tide (excerpts)	Theodore Huters
1922	此中秘密	"The Confidence in the Game"	Timothy C. Wong

== Filmography ==
Year	English title	Chinese title	Director	Writer	Notes
1923	Abandoned One	棄兒	Dan Duyu	Yes	Lost
1923	The Widow Wants to Remarry	古井重波記	Dan Duyu	Yes	Lost
1924	The Tea-Picking Girl	採茶女	Xu Hu	Yes	Lost
1925	The Stormy Night	風雨之夜	Yes	Yes	Partially lost
1925	The Lover Is Not a Former One	前情	Yes	Yes	Lost
1926	The Lucky Dolt	呆中福	Yes	Wang Bei'er	Lost
1926	Debt Circles	連環債	Yes	Yes	Lost
1926	Mother's Happiness	兒孫福	Shi Dongshan	Yes	Partially lost
1926	One Day Rest	休息一天	Yes	Yes	Lost
1926	Ma Jiefu	馬介甫	Yes	Zhou Shoujuan	Lost, based on Strange Stories from a Chinese Studio
1927	Sex Trap	美人計	Lu Jie	Yes	Lost, based on Romance of the Three Kingdoms
1927	Redress a Grievance	烏盆記	Yes	Yes	Lost, based on The Seven Heroes and Five Gallants
1927	Attacking Gaotang Prefecture	大破高唐州	Yes	Yes	Lost, based on Water Margin
1928	Shadows in the Old Palace	古宫魔影	Jiang Qifeng	Yes	Lost, based on Journey to the West
1928	Ma Zhenhua	馬振華	Yes	Yes	Lost, co-wrote with Wang Yuanlong
1928	That Is Me	就是我	Yes	Yes	Lost
1928	Marriage for Peace	二度梅	Yes	Yes	Lost
1929	Warnings for the Lovers	情欲寶鑑	Li Pingqian	Yes	Lost
1929	Attacking Nine-Dragon Mountain	大破九龍山	Yes	Yes	Lost
1929	Burning Nine-Dragon Mountain	火燒九龍山	Yes	Yes	Lost
1929	The Pearl Crown	珍珠冠	Yes	Yes	Lost
1929	The Flower of the Silver Screen	銀幕之花	Zheng Jiduo	Yes	Lost
1929	Lady Nine-Flower	九花娘	Yes	Yes	Lost
1948	Blood of the Beauty	美人血	Xu Xinfu	Yes	Lost
1948	Lü Siniang	呂四娘	Xu Xinfu	Yes	Lost
