= Y.C Zai =

Chinese actor and director

Y.C Zai, also known as Xie Yunqing (born 1906), was a Chinese actor and director. He starred in over 54 Chinese films from the 1920s to the 1980s. His most notable films were Don't Change Your Husband (1929), and Mother's Happiness (1926).

== Personal life ==
Kai was married to actress and director Xie Caizhen, who died during the Second Sino Japanese War.
