= Eight Thousand Li of Cloud and Moon =

Eight Thousand Li of Cloud and Moon may refer to:

- Eight Thousand Li of Cloud and Moon (film), a 1947 Chinese drama film set in the 1930s and 1940s
- Eight Thousand Li of Cloud and Moon (TV series), a 1988 Taiwanese historical television series based on the life of Yue Fei (1103–1142)

== See also ==
- Man Jiang Hong, a poem by Yue Fei where the phrase first appeared
