= The Culture Arts Review =

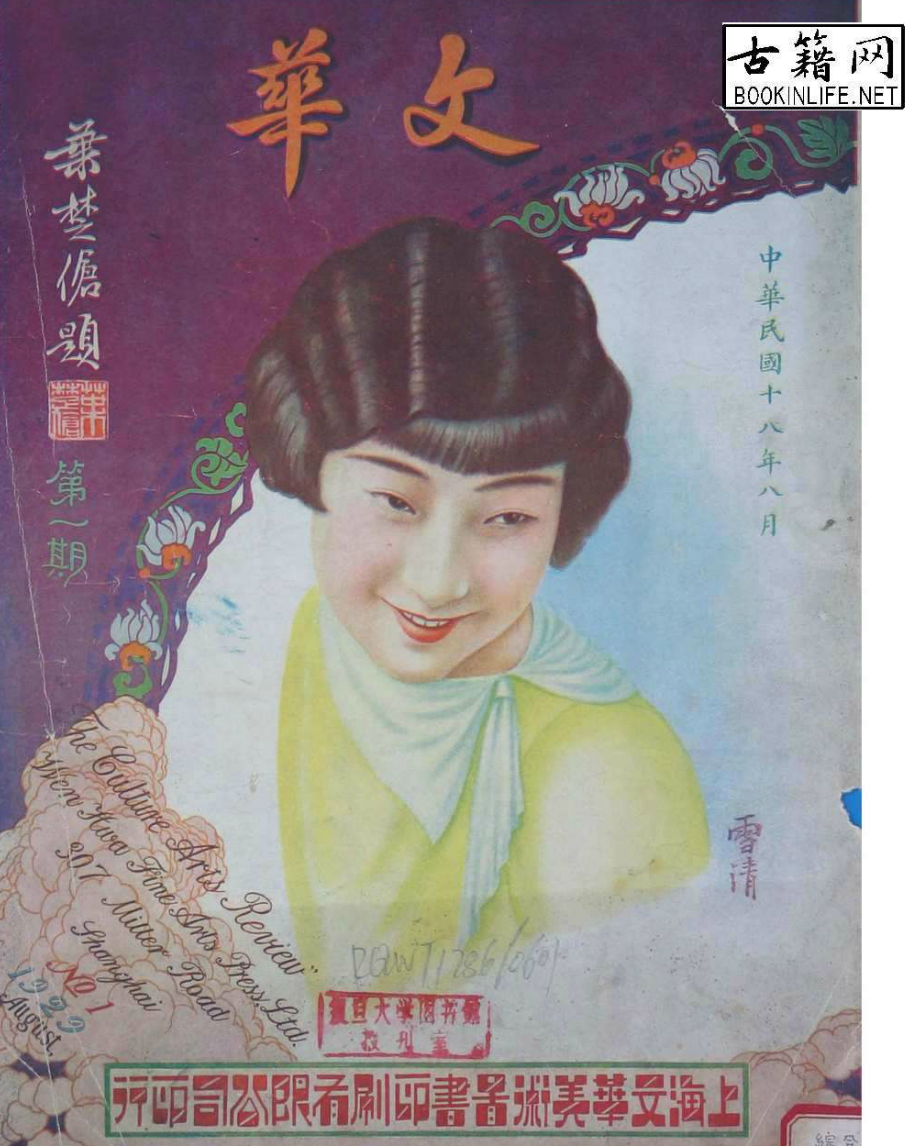
- The Culture Arts Review or Wen Hwa, issue 1
- Publisher: Wen Hwa Fine Arts Press Ltd.; Shanghai Friends Art Society; Shanghai Wenhua Art Book Printing Company, Ltd.
- First issue: August 1929
- Final issue: 1935
- Country: China
- Based in: Shanghai
- Language: Chinese, English

The Culture Arts Review or Wen Hwa (Chinese: 文華; pinyin: Wén huá) was an art monthly magazine based in Shanghai that ran from August 1929 through 1935, with 54 issues. It was published first by the Wen Hwa Fine Arts Press Limited in Shanghai. Other publishers names included the Shanghai Friends Art Society and the Shanghai Wenhua Art Book Printing Company. The magazine had drawing editors, Liang Dingming (梁鼎銘) and Liang Xueqing (梁雪清), who are brother and sister, and a literary-and-art editor. This post was held first by Zhao Hao (趙苕狂) and then by Zhang Yiwei (張亦庵).

The magazine had a text section and a pictures section. The magazine was multilingual in the sense that the captions with the pictures were in English and Chinese together. That mulitingual nature was prominent on the cover with the name of the magazine in two languages, similar to how another popular Shanghai magazine, The Young Companion, would manage their cover. Content included art, literature, and politics. Like Liangyou, it included pictures of urban women's lives, which has proven useful in studying the Republican era. While the bulk of literary and artists covered were well known in their circles, the magazine did include a number of female artists, something that was unusual for the time.
