= New Women =

1935 Chinese silent film

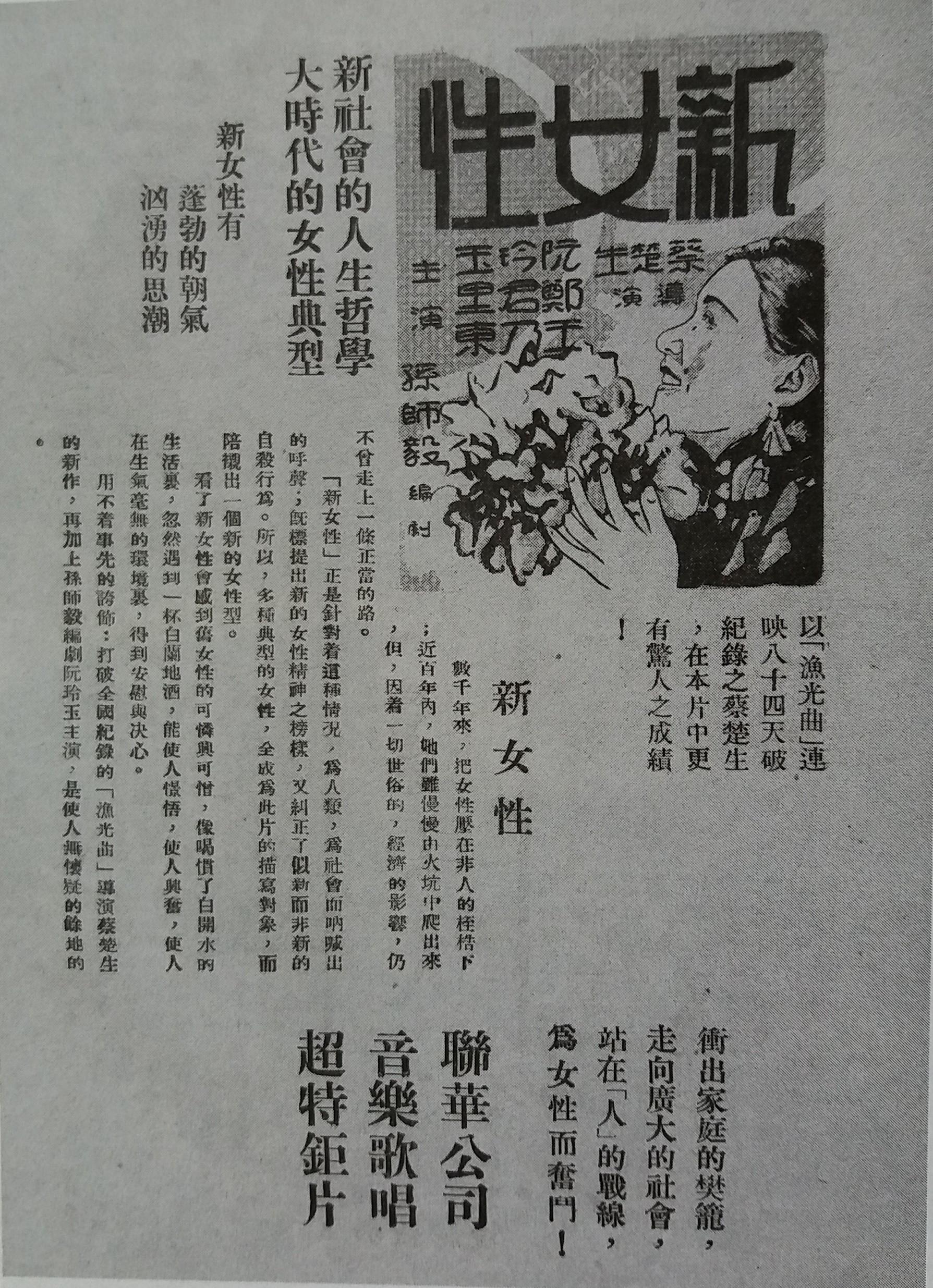
- Chinese promotional poster
- Directed by: Cai Chusheng
- Written by: Sun Shiyi
- Produced by: Lo Ming-yau; Lu Jie
- Starring: Ruan Lingyu; Wang Naidong; Zheng Junli
- Cinematography: Zhou Daming
- Music by: Nie Er; Zhou Can
- Production company: United Photoplay Service
- Release date: 3 February 1935
- Running time: 106 minutes
- Country: China
- Languages: Silent film Written Chinese intertitles

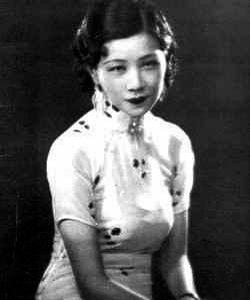
Ruan Lingyu

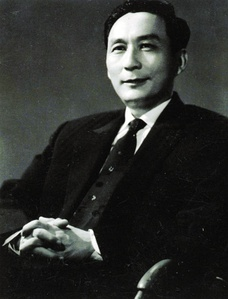
Zheng Junli

New Women (Chinese: 新女性; pinyin: Xīn nǚxìng) is a 1935 Chinese silent drama film produced by the United Photoplay Service. It is sometimes translated as New Woman. The film starred Ruan Lingyu (in her penultimate film) and was directed by Cai Chusheng. This film became one of Ruan Lingyu's better-known works. Her suicide on International Women's Day (8 March 1935) drew attention to the controversial status of new women and made this film a sensation in modern China.

New Women was considered to be a "problem film" in inciting "the woman question" (妇女问题, fùnü wèntí). It offered criticism to the traditional gender ideology and offered China a change from "old women" to "new women" as an alternative social convention.

New Women was based upon the life of Chinese actress and writer, Ai Xia, who had committed suicide in 1934. Ai Xia's death following her role in A Modern Woman (1933) inspired Cai Chusheng to emulate the tragedy in this film.

A print of New Women is currently maintained by the China Film Archive.

== Plot ==
The film centres around an educated and modern young woman, Wei Ming (Ruan Lingyu), living in 1920s Shanghai. As the film begins, Wei Ming is working as a music teacher for a girls' school, harbouring dreams of becoming a writer. She befriends her neighbour Aying, who is a factory worker and teaches patriotic work songs to her coworkers.

Dr. Wang, the school board minister, who is also Wei Ming's old classmate Zhang Xiuzhen's husband, likes Wei Ming and wants her to become his concubine. Wei Ming ignores his advances as she falls in love with the editor of a publishing company Yu Haichou. Yu Haichou, however, refuses Wei Ming. Dr. Wang, angered by Wei Ming's rejection, retaliates against Wei Ming and convinces the principal of the school to fire her.

At the same time, Wei Ming's past catches up to her. Before coming to Shanghai, she had a love affair with a man who left her after she became pregnant. Her older sister who was taking care of her daughter all this time was coming to Shanghai to see her as they were in need of money. Wei Ming's daughter, Xiao Hong, is shown to be suffering from pneumonia and after arriving in Shanghai her condition begins to deteriorate. The two sisters took Xiao Hong to the hospital, but they were refused service because they could not pay the fee upfront. Now that Wei Ming has lost her income as a teacher, she hopes to receive payment from the novel she has written called "The Tomb of Love" instead. She attempted to request an advanced payment from the publisher but was immediately rejected.

Under such harsh circumstances, Wei Ming decides to become a "slave for one night" and prostitute herself. Unexpectedly, her first client is Dr. Wang. Under his mockery, Wei Ming angrily hits Dr. Wang and runs away. She helplessly watches her daughter die, then commits suicide afterwards by overdosing on sleeping pills. Yu Haichou takes Wei Ming to the hospital where Aying attempts to inspire her to continue living. Wei Ming cries out "I want to live, I want revenge". However, the doctor can no longer rescue Wei Ming and she dies. The publisher and the journalist cynically joins to sponsor Wei Ming's funeral for publicity benefits. Aying continues to lead her factory women workers in choral singing classes. The film ends with a scene of Aying and her factory co-workers walking out of the factory, stepping on a newspaper announcing Wei Ming's suicide.

== Cast ==
- Ruan Lingyu (阮玲玉), as Wei Ming, the heroine, a young woman who teaches music at a private, all-girls high school and who is trying to have her novel published;
- Wang Naidong (王乃东), as Dr. Wang, Wei Ming's suitor and primary antagonist, married to Wei's old schoolmate;
- Zheng Junli (郑君里), as Yu Haichou, an editor at a publishing company, a friend of Wei Ming and her love interest;
- Wang Moqiu (王默秋), as Mrs. Wang, Wei Ming's former schoolmate, now married to Dr. Wang;
- Yin Xu (殷虚), as Li Aying, Wei Ming's neighbor, a factory worker, a physically strong and mentally disciplined woman who devotes her spare time to educating female laborers;
- Chen Sujuan (陈素娟), as Wei Xiaohong, Wei Ming's daughter;
- Gu Menghe (顾梦鹤), as Qi Weide, the editor-in-chief of the local newspaper;
- Wu Yin (吴茵), as the music school principal;
- Tang Tianxiu (汤天绣), as Wei Ming's elder sister;
- Liu Qiong (刘琼), as Doctor #1;
- Shang Guanwu (尚冠武), as Doctor #2;
- Fang Lianying (方怜影), as landlady in the same building as Wei Ming;
- Zhou Qianyun (周倩云), as the daughter of the landlady;
- Long Ling (龙凌), as Wei Ming's ex-husband;
- Qiu Yiwei (裘逸韦), as the publisher;
- Hong Jingling (洪警铃), as the dancing hall manager;
- Fei Baiqing (费柏青), as the man in the flat cap;
- Diao Banhua (貂斑华), as the dancing girl;
- Huang Yunzhen (黄筠贞), as Madam Xu;
- Zhuo Mei (卓梅), as the hospital nurse.

== Reception ==
In the 1930s, women were often featured in magazines and advertisements to convey the image of a modern lifestyle. Due to the association of a woman's qualifications with her ability to raise the future generation, women's education was also heavily promoted, giving them a path towards integrating in the workforce. However, this idea of the modernizing role of women was met with criticism from the cultural sphere. "For example, some pointed to the so-called disadvantages of women receiving higher education, claiming that some modern women were no longer faithfully carrying out family duties."

When New Women was released in 1935, the film was interpreted by many as an example of the leftward development of Cai's politics on the traditional constraints on women in mass media and urban society. One newspaper reviewer praised "the number of films with 'the woman question' as their subject over the past few years" and declared that "it is inevitable that this kind of film would go on to influence many aspects of the women's movement to come." 'The woman question' was centred around the discussion of love, marriage, education and employment for women. The term "new women" also symbolized the start of modernist discourse in China. Following the release of the film, critics were "quick to compare the three kinds of women and to try to identify who the new woman might be." Newspaper reviews analyse these "new women" figures within their respective social strata:

Zhang Xiuzhen is a college graduate (undoubtedly the daughter of a capitalist family), but she is willing to be a man's plaything all her life as Mrs. Wang of the comprador class. Li Aying has her roots in the working class, combating the hostile environment in her struggle. Wei Ming's background seems to be somewhere between the former two women and, because of that, she comes to be incapable of extricating herself from the sad fate of the wavering petit bourgeois.

The release of New Women was marred by a backlash from the press who objected to their profession's unflattering portrayal in the film. In Shanghai, the commercial press criticized the film for depicting the news media as slanderous. The Journalists' Union protested the film's characterization of their trade, and the spectre of negative publicity pressured Lianhua studio into making an open apology.

The portrayal of the new woman by Ruan Linyu was also heavily criticized for her way of life and for using suicide "as the ultimate way of protesting against discrimination and gossip." In an attempt to clear accusations that the movie was "condoning" the suicide of New Women, the producers agreed to screen the film at a fundraiser for a women's educational centre on International Women's Day, March 8.

The suicide of the film's star, Ruan Lingyu, by barbiturate overdose exactly one month after the movie premiered caused further controversy. Her death was purportedly due to the gossip and exposure surrounding her personal life. In her final note, she stated, "Gossip is a fearful thing", attributing her suicide to the same kind of media harassment her character Wei Ming experienced. The idea of the protagonist's "crisis in subjectivity" was brought to life by Ruan's suicide. It provoked much debate in the Shanghai news media on the controversy over the representation and status of women in popular culture and shed a light on the increasing feminist problems of modernity. Much discussion surrounded the similarities between Ai Xia, Ruan Lingyu, and her character Wei Ming, all sources of scrutiny in 'the woman question' of urban China in the 1930s.

== Historical background ==
In early 20th century China, the traditional social morals dictated that women must be modest and reserved in their homes. But after the re-founding of the Republic of China in 1911, the grip on traditionalism started to weaken. Women were given more access to education, employment opportunities, and began appearing more in the public's eye. Reformers started to rise and promote “social equality” in society for freedom of love, freedom from sexual discrimination, and freedom of choice.

Following the May Fourth Movement, the term xin nüxing (new woman) was popularized. The direct translation of nüxing is "female sex". However, before the May Fourth Movement, women in China were described by the term funü which emphasized familial and gender roles rather than biological sex. The new woman's role in modern China was often debated by intellectuals, liberals, and The Nationalists and the Communist. Nonetheless, the "new woman" icon found its way into popular media in the forms of film, photographs, magazines, fashion advertisements and calendar posters. Cai Chusheng's film is considered to be the most well-known of the "new woman" genre films. The pioneers of the Chinese Women's Liberation Movement began to pay attention to women's equality of employment and economic independence. They argued that the fundamental reason why women had lost their independence for thousands of years lay in their financial attachment to men and the denial of property rights. Lu Xun once regarded economic independence as the premise of women's liberation, and Li Dazhao believed that women's employment was the basis of equality between men and women.

Director Cai Chusheng and scriptwriter Sun Shiyi based the plot of New Women on the life and death of actress Ai Xia. While Wei Ming, played by Ruan Lingyu was a teacher, Ai Xia was an actress that committed suicide in 1934 at the age of 21 after starring in a movie that she wrote herself called "A Modern Woman". Ai Xia was condemned by the popular press when they found out about a single act of prostitution to raise money in order to afford medicine for her sick daughter. Cai Chusheng was thought to have been affiliated with Ai Xia in some way and made New Women for personal reasons. Ai Xia's suicide and legacy in the film industry in China made her become a symbol for the Chinese women's emancipation. Ai Xia was one of the new-style women emerging in early 20th century China. During these times, female suicide was not an uncommon occurrence with Confucian and patriarchal pressures for women to be mothers and wives while not expressing their true selves. Ai Xia represented this ideology of new women being a young intellectual woman that reflected the need for modernity of fashion, customs and emancipation from men. Ruan Lingyu ended up playing a role that was relatable to her own life. Ruan Lingyu committed suicide on International Women's Day (March 8, 1935) by overdosing on sleeping pills. Her suicide note apparently contained a line which says "gossip is a fearful thing" (人言可畏), although recent researchers have doubted the note's authenticity as it appeared to have been forged by Tang Jishan. Even China's preeminent intellectual Lu Xun was appalled at the details surrounding Ruan's death and wrote an essay entitled "Gossip is a Fearful Thing", denouncing the tabloids. Her funeral procession was three miles long, three women committed suicide during it and the New York Times ran a front page story, calling it "the most spectacular funeral of the century."

Ai Xia and Ruan's real life suicides sandwich New Women's fictional suicide from the film. The hardships experienced by women such as Ai Xia and Ruan Lingyu could be attributed to this cultural change in regards to "the woman question" at the time. As stated in Christopher Rhea's "Chinese Film Classics 1922-1949"; "Ruan Lingyu has become a symbol of the glamor, romance, and unfulfilled potential of Republican China, and her story has been endlessly retold."

At that time, female writers were respected in Shanghai. However, the rise of the status of women in society was perceived by some to be a threat to man's status in the family and in society. Therefore, females still needed time for society to adapt to the modernization and let others accept them.

At the beginning of the 20th century, Shanghai, Guangzhou, Jiangsu, and other coastal areas were the first places where women workers appeared. Some women also raised money to set up shops and businesses to create opportunities for other women. Some industries even preferred to recruit female employees and paid equal salaries to female and male employees for the first time. Teachers and doctors were the first intellectual professions for women, and women soon appeared in banks and shops as well. They even found work as actors, writers, translators, and editors. Wei Ming in New Women, is like Ai Xia or Ruan Lingyu in that they are the products of this era.

== Music ==
There were two important songs in the movie. One is called "Huangpu River", Aiyin's revision of "Peach Blossom River". This song was cut from the film in order to pass the government's censors. The other is "Song of the New Women", which appeared at the end of the film. The song culminates in a revolutionary verser which envisions the simultaneous dissolution of class and gender divisions. It was composed by Nie Er, a famous composer who composed "many epochal songs in reflection of people's hardship and Anti-Japanese war at his time, all of which had profound influence and extensive popularity in the whole nation." He also wrote the melody later chosen for the national anthem of the People's Republic of China.

Under the crisis of national subjugation and the urgency of Anti Japanese salvation It fortifies the ideal image of "new women as social workers and vanguard of building a new society." The iconic left wing movement music presented in "New Women" explains that when "national crisis is imminent, national identity and class identity become the new direction of the development of film and film music."

== Reputation ==
The year 1935 was the time when Chinese left-wing cinema was emerging and gradually developing, and as one of its important masterpieces, New Woman was also considered "a significant milestone in modern Chinese feminist cinema"[source1] and "laid the foundation for future "new women" films." Director Cai Chusheng was thus seen as a "sign of the move to the left-wing."

Today, the film's reputation has become firmly established as one of the classic examples of 1930s Chinese film. The organizers of the 5th Asia-Pacific Triennial on Contemporary Art referred to the film, in their retrospective of Ruan Lingyu's work, as a "Masterpiece in the spirit of the May 4th tradition."

As a chapter that marks the beginning of Cai Chusheng's film career, the film "New Women" is a remarkable one. There are episodes and no dialogues when the film is released. It can be regarded as a transitional bridge from Chinese silent films to sound films. In the film, Ruan Lingyu's performance can also be described as powerful and sorrowful.

The story is allegedly based on the talented actress Ai Xia who committed suicide under the dual pressure of survival and spirit of being the spotlight. The director Cai Chusheng was deeply affected by her death and realized that Ai Xia's life and death is of great social significance. He hoped to make a movie based on her story to educate the female population that suicide is not the solution. As a make-up version of Ai Xia's tragic fate, the actress Ruan Lingyu starred as the main protagonist in "New Women". The protagonist in the story has been abandoned by her oppressive patriarchal family to start an independent life as a writer. She wrote the autobiographical novel "The Tomb of Love." However, it was impossible for her to escape the fate of suicide as in reality, females were mere playthings of male desires and a gimmick in the commercial operation of the publishing industry. The film has caused an uproar due to the violation of the patriarchal society before its release. A rebellious new woman's echo-like record of self-destruction seems to show quite clearly the fragile collusion between women and the society. In addition to the message that the film conveys, the death of Ruan Lingyu after a month of the film's premiere is regarded as a female tragedy under the commercial and star system, which illustrates the tragic impact of the new woman and patriarchal/male culture. It is also a reflection of the conflict between left-wing movies and the right-wing newspapers. Interestingly, this conflict did not damage the reputation of the director of the film, Cai Chusheng, but ultimately sacrificed the reputation and life of actress Ruan Lingyu. The film New Women is now closely linked to the death of Ruan Lingyu, as a symbol of the dangers of mass media and female objectivity in the film industry.

== Critical analysis ==
=== Themes ===
Gender identity and male objectification of females is also an important theme in New Women. Wei is often seen as an object for consumption, not a person by the male characters around her. Wei suffers from losing her job after she rejects the advances of Doctor Wang, who then offers to help her only if she becomes his concubine. The film also shows that Wei's book, "The Tomb of Love", was published because the publisher thought he could market the book with an attractive female author. When Wei was forced into prostitution to earn enough money to pay for the deposit of the hospital fee, she was shocked that Madam Xu told her to sell her body. However, Madam Xu counters that “but if we women want to make a little money in this world, what other path is open to us?”

=== Motifs ===
Compared to Cai Chusheng's previous films, New Women, by its title and content, is a film that focuses on the “modern transformation of Chinese women.” In Cai Chusheng's New Woman, we see several motifs that support the central idea of the narrative. The first is the irony of the traditional wife. Mrs. Wang is dependent on Dr. Wang and since she has no financial resources, she has to tolerate her husband's indiscretions. The second motif in the narrative is about women's rights. Although the female protagonist Wei Ming does not get a perfect ending, she is a new generation woman who is brave enough to pursue a career, a new life and even a relationship, compared to a traditional wife like Mrs. Wang. The third motif is about class struggle, such as the "prejudice" in the workplace, the threat from high social status people like Dr. Wang, and Wei Ming's struggle and compromise in the face of life.

== Further viewing ==
- New Women (1935) with English subtitles on YouTube
- The Goddess (1934 film), Ruan Lingyu's other well known film
- Three Modern Women – 1932 film directed by Bu Wancang
- Life - 1934 film directed by Fei Mu
- National Customs - 1935 film directed by Luo Mingyou and Zhu Shilin
- Women Side by Side – 1949 film directed by Chen Liting
- Interview of the director, Cai Chusheng, talks about "New Life" and Ruan Lingyu
- Chinese Film Classics (chinesefilmclassics.org) - scholarly website on Chinese film history, featuring information on New Women and other films of Ruan Lingyu and Cai Chusheng
