= Ai Xia =

Chinese actress and screenwriter

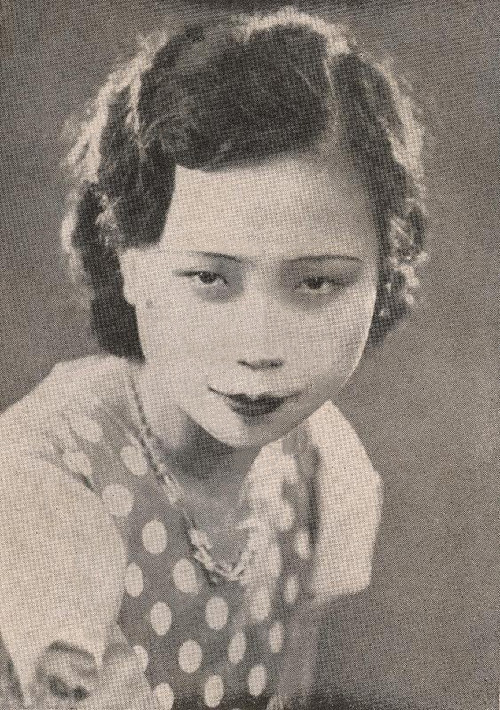
- Ai Xia, c. 1933
- Born: Yan Yinan; 29 November 1912; Tianjin, Republic of China
- Died: 15 February 1934 (aged 21); Shanghai, Republic of China
- Cause of death: Suicide by opium overdose
- Years active: 1932–1934

Ai Xia (Chinese: 艾霞; 29 November 1912 – 15 February 1934) was a Chinese left-wing silent film actress and screenwriter. She committed suicide in 1934, the first Chinese actor to have done so. Her suicide inspired Cai Chusheng's classic film New Women starring Ruan Lingyu, who also killed herself soon after the release of the film.

== Life and career ==
Ai Xia was born Yan Yinan (Chinese: 严以南) on November 29, 1912 in Tianjin to a large middle-class family. She attended university. After graduating, she fell in love with her cousin and had a child. Her family disapproved of the relationship, resulting in her lover leaving. In 1928, she was in an arranged marriage but, as a personal protest, left home for Shanghai to pursue a career in film.

Ai Xia started her career as a stage actor with the South China Theater Society (Nanguo jushe), founded by Tian Han, before joining the Leftists Dramatists League (Zuoyi juzuojia lianmeng). She was introduced to Mingxing (Star) Film Company in 1932. She wrote a book Xiandai yi Nüxing (A Woman of Today) in 1933. The book was adapted as a film in the same year. Despite the intrigue around the story, the film was not well received by critics because of its focus on revolution. Ai Xia was one of only two female screenwriters during the "Left-Wing" movement in Chinese film. She starred in a total of eight films in her lifetime.

== Death and legacy ==
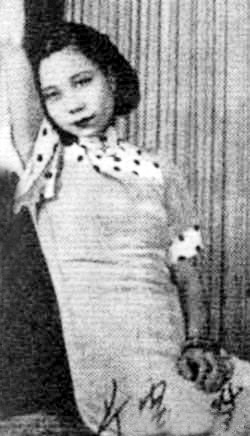
Ai Xia

Ai committed suicide in 1934 by consuming raw opium. Being the first actress in the Republic of China to do so, her death is considered iconic in Chinese film.

The film New Women is based on her life. It stars actress Ruan Lingyu who also committed suicide shortly after the film's release in 1935. It is speculated that director Cai Chusheng may have been romantically involved with Ai and thus, made the film for personal reasons.

== Filmography ==
- Adventures in a Battlefield (1922)
- Jiu hen xin chou (1922)
- Chuncan (Spring Silkworms) (1933)
- Good Harvest (1933)
- Sons and Daughters of the Times (1933)
- A Woman of Today (1933)
- Two Verses One (1933)
- Cosmetics of Market (1933)

== Bibliography ==
- A Woman of Today (现代一女性, 1933) ISBN 978-7511006271

== See also ==
- Cinema of China
