= Guan Zilan =

Chinese avant-garde painter

Guan Zilan 關紫蘭
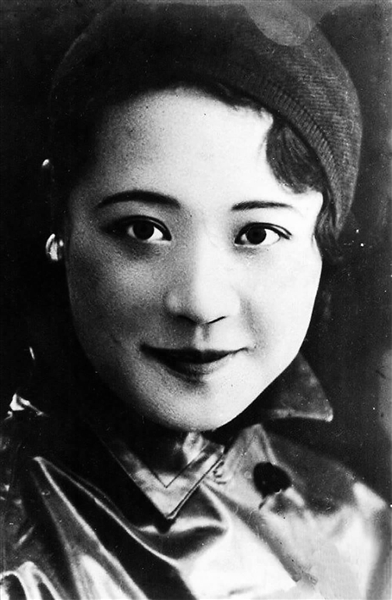
- Guan in 1960s
- Born: January 1903; Shanghai, Qing China
- Died: June 30, 1986 (aged 83); Shanghai, People's Republic of China
- Education: China Art University, Bunka Gakuin
- Known for: Oil painting
- Notable work: Portrait of Miss L. (1929)
- Movement: Fauvism

Guan Zilan (Chinese: 關紫蘭; Wade–Giles: Kuan Tzu-lan; January 1903 – 30 June 1986), also known as Violet Kwan, was a Chinese avant-garde painter. She was one of the first artists to introduce Fauvism to China, and was known for applying Western painting style to Chinese traditional subjects. Her most famous work is Portrait of Miss L. (1929). Although an art world favorite during the late 1920s and the 1930s, she stopped painting after the onset of the Cultural Revolution and became mostly forgotten in Communist China.

== Early life and career ==
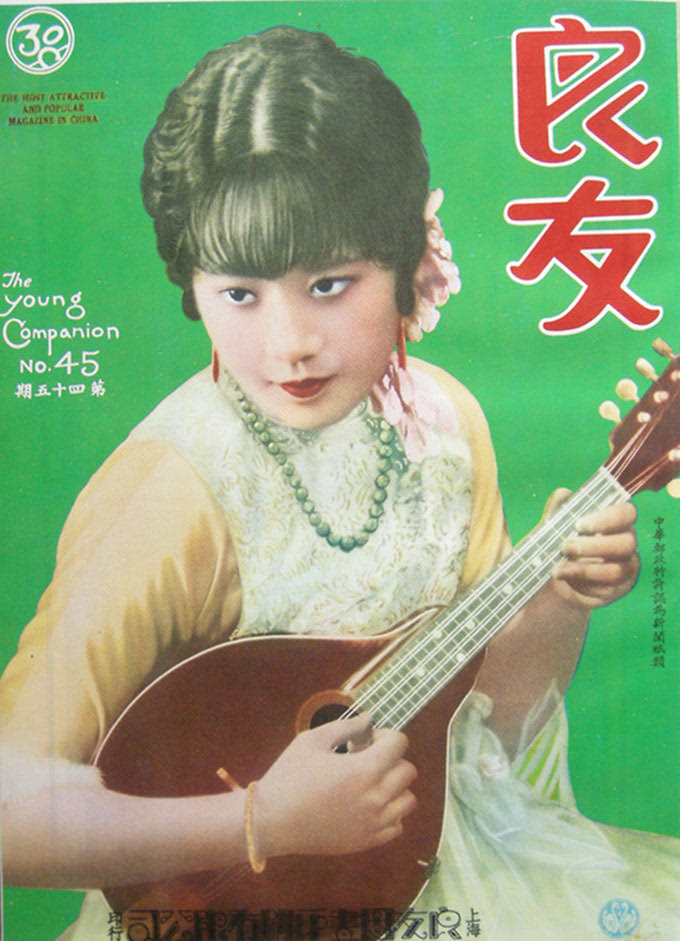
Guan Zilan on the cover of The Young Companion, c. 1929

Guan was born in Shanghai in 1903, during the tumultuous late Qing dynasty. She was of Nanhai, Guangdong ancestry. Her parents, who were successful textile merchants involved in textile design, gave her an artistic education from a young age. She studied painting at Shanghai Shenzhou Girls' School and later Western painting at China Art University (中華藝術大學) in Shanghai, where she was taught by the well known painters Chen Baoyi (陳抱一) and Hong Ye (洪野).

After her graduation in 1927, she followed Chen's advice and went to Japan to further her studies. She enrolled at Bunka Gakuin in Tokyo, and her style became strongly influenced by Henri Matisse's Fauvism. In the 1920s and the 1930s, Chinese women who had successful careers in Japan attracted significant attention from Japanese media. Guan made headlines as a representative of the "modern girl" and was projected as a model beauty.

Guan returned to Shanghai in 1930, and became one of the first artists to bring Fauvism to China. She and her fellow female painter Pan Yuliang became favourites in the art world of the young Republic of China (1912–49). Women artists trained in Western style, such as Guan and Pan, captured the fascination of the public, and were accepted as the embodiment of modernity. Her paintings and portraits were repeatedly published in the popular magazine Liangyou (The Young Companion). She debuted in the magazine in 1927, when it published works selected from her graduation exhibition at China Art University. In 1930, when Guan held a solo exhibition in Shanghai, Liangyou dedicated a full page to her paintings from the exhibition. A photograph of her playing the mandolin was chosen for the magazine's cover.

== Later life ==
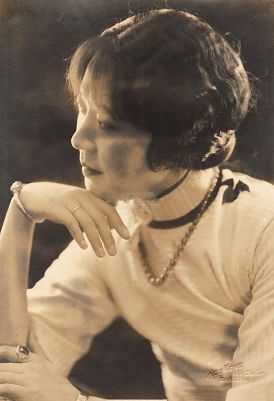
Guan Zilan in 1932

During the Second Sino-Japanese War, when eastern China, including Shanghai, was occupied by the Empire of Japan, Guan's former teacher Chen Baoyi refused to work for the Japanese and fell into penury. Guan supported him financially until his death in 1945.

Guan stayed in Shanghai after the Communists took over China in 1949 and lived on Liyang Road in Hongkou District. She worked at the Shanghai Research Institute of Culture and History and became a member of the China Artists Association, changing her artistic style to conform with the socialist realism dominant in Communist China. She stopped painting altogether after the eruption of the Cultural Revolution in 1966. She was gradually forgotten by the Chinese public, although her Portrait of Miss L. was selected for exhibition at the Guggenheim Museum in New York City in 1998. On 30 June 1986, Guan Zilan died of a heart attack at her home.

In 2007, a box of old photographs from the 1920s and the 1930s were rediscovered in the basement of Shanghai's Wang Kai Photo Studio. The Xinmin Evening News published some of the photos, but misidentified Guan Zilan as the famous movie star Ruan Lingyu. The error was rectified when Guan's daughter saw the photos in the newspaper and recognized them as her mother's.

== Art ==
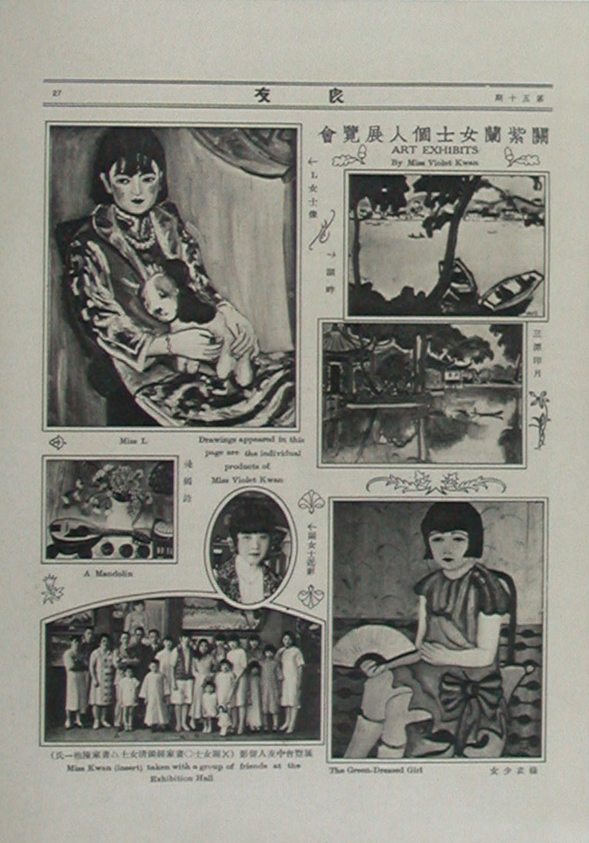
Exhibition of Guan's artwork in The Young Companion magazine, issue 57.

Guan was deeply influenced by Fauvism, while applying Western avant-garde painting style to traditional Chinese subjects. Her oil paintings use a high degree of simplification and abstraction, with rich contrasting colours. In Portrait of Miss L. (1929), her most famous work, she painted a modern woman in a Chinese qipao dress with a dog on her lap. Rather than painting an image of likeness, she turned the picture into a visual play by using broad strokes and vivid, flatly applied colours. The style is reminiscent of Henri Matisse and Maurice de Vlaminck.

After media reporting of the rediscovery of Guan's photographs, her art began to recapture the attention of the Chinese public. In January 2012, her oil painting Flowers in a Vase was sold for CN¥2.6 million.

== Family ==
Guan Zilan had a daughter named Liang Yawen (梁雅雯), and a grandson Ye Qi (葉奇), who is a photographer.
