= Hu Lanqi =

Chinese writer and military leader (1901–1994)

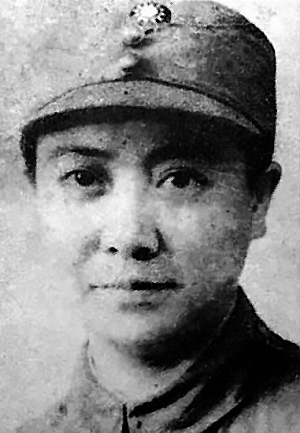
Hu Lanqi in 1937, when she was awarded the rank of Major General

Hu Lanqi (Chinese: 胡兰畦; pinyin: Hú Lánqí; Wade–Giles: Hu Lan-ch'i; 1901 – 13 December 1994), also spelled Hu Lanxi, was a Chinese writer and military leader. She joined the National Revolutionary Army in 1927 and the Chinese branch of the Communist Party of Germany in 1930. She was imprisoned by Nazi Germany in 1933 and wrote an influential memoir of her experience, for which she was invited by Maxim Gorky to meet him in Moscow. After the outbreak of the Second Sino-Japanese War in 1937, she organized a team of women soldiers to resist the Japanese invasion, and became the first woman to be awarded the rank of Major General by the Republic of China. She supported the Communists during the Chinese Civil War, but was persecuted in Mao Zedong's political campaigns following the Communist victory in mainland China. She survived the Cultural Revolution to see her political rehabilitation, and published a detailed memoir of her life in the 1980s.

Based on her early life, the writer Mao Dun wrote the novel Rainbow (1929), whose heroine, Mei, would become more famous than Hu herself.

She was married and divorced twice. She rejected a marriage proposal from the Sichuan warlord Yang Sen, and was later engaged to Chen Yi, the Chinese communist leader who would become one of China's Ten Marshals and would serve as Foreign Minister, but they never married.

== Early life ==
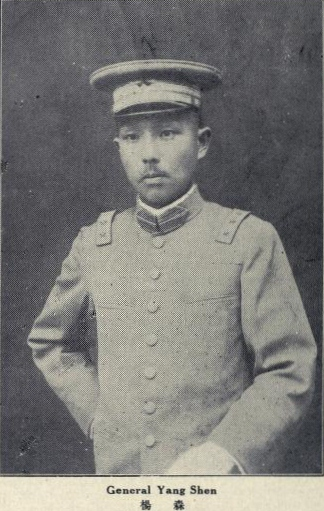
General Yang Sen, whose marriage proposal was rejected by Hu Lanqi.

Hu Lanqi was born to an affluent family in Chengdu, Sichuan Province in 1901, during the tumultuous late Qing dynasty. Her father Hu Qingyun (胡卿云) was a descendant of the famous Ming dynasty general Hu Dahai. Hu Qingyun refused to serve the Manchu Qing empire, which had conquered the Ming. After her graduation from high school in 1920, her parents arranged for her to marry a businessman cousin. However, soon afterwards she rebelled against the arranged marriage and divorced her husband, which was highly controversial at the time.

In 1921, Hu went to Luzhou in southern Sichuan, the base of the progressive warlord Yang Sen, where she worked at the elementary school of South Sichuan Teachers College and studied at the college. She taught two of Yang's five wives (polygamy being legal at the time) to read and befriended another, but when Yang proposed to Hu, she angrily refused to become his sixth wife. When the influential writer Mao Dun heard about her story from a mutual friend, he wrote the novel Rainbow, which was published in 1929. The novel's heroine Mei, modelled after Hu Lanqi's life from 1920 to 1924, would become much better known in China than Hu herself.

During her time in Luzhou, she befriended Chen Yi, who was working as an editor at the progressive newspaper Xin Shu Bao (新蜀报, "New Sichuan Newspaper"), based in nearby Chongqing. In spring 1925, she married the young officer Chen Mengyun (陈梦云), who, unbeknownst to her, had already been married to a tongyangxi.

== Northern Expedition ==
In the spring of 1926, Hu Lanqi left home for Guangzhou to work for He Xiangning, Minister of Women's Affairs of the Kuomintang (KMT) government. The following year, she became a cadet of the Whampoa Military Academy in Wuhan and enlisted in the KMT's National Revolutionary Army, which was then waging the Northern Expedition against the warlords. She was one of a small number of women recruits, which included Xie Bingying and Zhao Yiman. After initial success, the KMT leader Chiang Kai-shek turned against the Communists, who had been until then allied with the KMT, and committed the Shanghai massacre in April 1927. The Wuhan-based left wing of the KMT, who were sympathetic to the Communists, capitulated to Chiang's right wing. Hu Lanqi was discharged from the army when the military academy was dissolved in July 1927. Instead of returning home, she continued to work for the left-wing KMT leader He Xiangning, helping her unionize female workers. She broke up with her second husband whose political views differed from hers.

== Exile in Europe ==
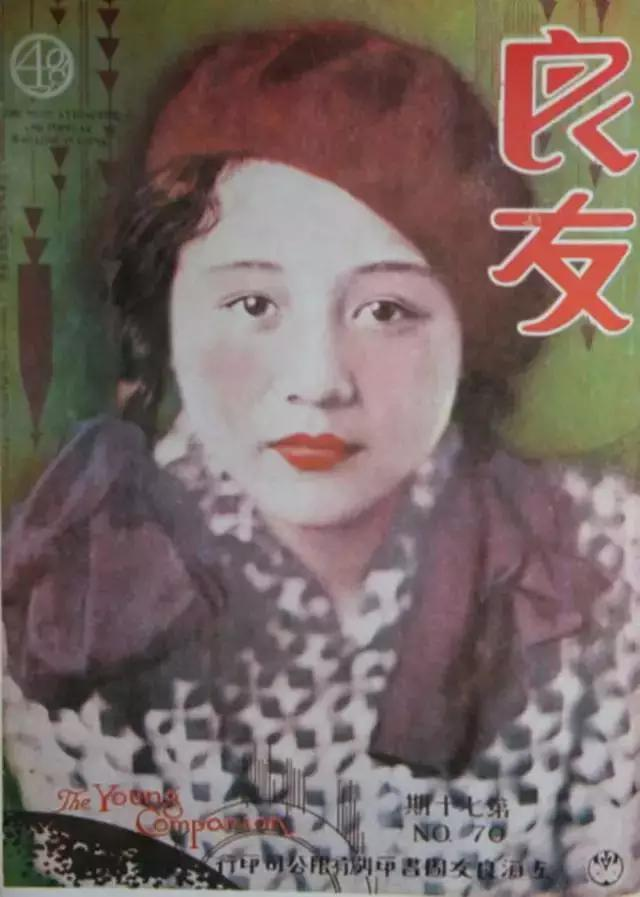
Hu Lanqi appeared on the cover of The Young Companion in 1932.

After being blacklisted by the KMT, Hu left China for Europe in 1928. She briefly shared an apartment with He Xiangning in Berlin, and through the introduction of He's son Liao Chengzhi and Cheng Fangwu, she joined the Chinese-speaking group of the Communist Party of Germany. He Xiangning also introduced Hu to Soong Ching-ling, the widow of President Sun Yat-sen. When Soong's mother died, Hu accompanied Soong back to China to attend her funeral in July 1931, before returning to Germany. In 1932, her image appeared on the cover of the popular magazine The Young Companion.

In December 1932, Hu was briefly arrested by the German police after attending a protest against the Japanese invasion of Manchuria. Two months later, following the Nazi Machtergreifung, Adolf Hitler suppressed the German Communist Party and threw thousands of party members in jail. Hu Lanqi was arrested and imprisoned for three months. When the news reached China, Soong Ching-ling and the prominent writer Lu Xun formally petitioned the German consulate in Shanghai and secured her release. She was deported to France and moved to England soon afterward.

In 1934, she began writing In a German Women's Prison, recounting her experience in jail with political prisoners and petty criminals. The French newspaper Le Monde published excerpts of the book, and it was soon translated and published in English, German, Russian, Spanish and Chinese, making her a celebrity. In the summer of 1934 the Soviet luminary Maxim Gorky invited her to attend the First Congress of Russian Writers, and reportedly singled her out for praise. In Moscow she met the Chinese Communist leaders Li Lisan and Kang Sheng, who asked her to go to Hong Kong to act as a liaison between left-wing KMT leaders and the Communists.

== Sino-Japanese War ==
After a brief stay in Hong Kong, where she met the disaffected KMT leader Li Jishen, Hu was in Shanghai when the Japanese launched an all-out attack on the city in August 1937, at the beginning of the eight-year-long Second Sino-Japanese War. In September, she organized the Shanghai Labor Women's War Service Corps to support the 18th Army of the KMT.

When Shanghai fell to the Japanese, Hu and her women soldiers retreated inland with hundreds of thousands of soldiers and refugees. They reached Wuhan after many nights of gruelling marches. She gave her written accounts of the corps to the war reporter Fan Changjiang, who distributed them widely and made Hu's corps famous in China. She became the first Chinese woman to be awarded the rank of major general by the Republic of China's Central Military Commission.

Late in 1937, she brought her corps to Nanchang, where she reunited with her old friend Chen Yi, who was by then a top commander of the Communist New Fourth Army. According to Hu's own account, they fell in love and became engaged. She wanted her women's corps to join the Communist rather than the KMT army, but the idea was rejected by the New Fourth Army commander Xiang Ying, who feared it might cause trouble with the KMT leadership.

Hu did not witness the worst atrocities of the war, such as the Nanjing Massacre, but she was present when the retreating KMT soldiers burned down the city of Changsha. In her reports she wrote about the numerous dead and dying soldiers and civilians she had encountered, and her corps was frequently attacked by Japanese bombing raids.

After her corps was disbanded in 1942, she was sent to Jiangxi Province to reclaim abandoned farmland where war orphans could work, feed themselves and receive education. Just before the Japanese surrendered, they launched a last-ditch attack in July 1945 in Jiangxi, threatening her community.

== Civil War ==
Soon after the Japanese surrender, the Second United Front between the KMT and the Communists broke apart and the Chinese Civil War resumed. Hu Lanqi again worked under Li Jishen, persuading various KMT commanders to defect to the Communist side. At that time, the Sichuan general Yang Sen was serving as Governor of Guizhou Province, who hired her as Chief Editor of the Guizhou Daily. She urged Yang Sen to abandon his support for Chiang Kai-shek, but Yang had commanded attacks against the Communists in the past and did not believe they would forgive him. He eventually retreated to Taiwan with Chiang in 1949.

== People's Republic of China ==
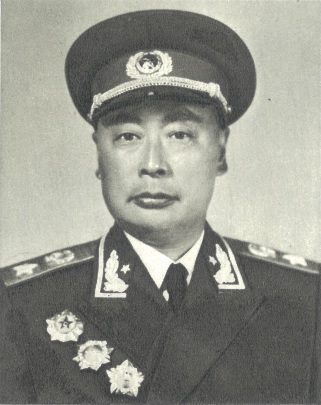
Marshal Chen Yi, to whom Hu Lanqi was engaged

When the Communists won the Civil War and established the People's Republic in 1949, Hu Lanqi was in Shanghai with her Communist friends. She celebrated when the People's Liberation Army entered Shanghai. Her fiancé Chen Yi, whom she had not seen since 1937, was appointed Shanghai's first mayor under the new regime. However, when she tried to contact Chen, she was told that he had already married and did not want to meet her. Disappointed, she helped some Buddhist friends set up a vegetarian restaurant in Shanghai, before moving to Beijing, where an old friend from her European days helped her secure a job as an accountant in a college.

The first years of the People's Republic were relatively uneventful, but she was accused of embezzlement during the Three-anti Campaign in 1952. When Mao Zedong launched the Anti-Rightist Campaign in 1957, Hu, like many other political activists, was denounced as a "Rightist" and expelled from the Communist Party. When the Cultural Revolution began in 1966, "Rightists" like Hu were severely persecuted, and she was viciously beaten by the Red Guards.

As the Cultural Revolution neared its end, her Rightist label was removed in 1974. She assumed that some of her friends in high positions had survived the turmoil and secured her political rehabilitation. She was allowed to retire from her college in 1975, and went back to her hometown Chengdu. In 1987, her party membership was restored. In Chengdu, she met the abandoned wife of Huang Jilu (黃季陸), a KMT government minister who had fled to Taiwan. After seeing the squalor and misery she was living in, Hu organized an "Old People's Association" to improve the lives of the elderly, which attracted 1,000 members. West China Medical University set up a geriatric health centre after her lobbying, and she helped to raise funds to set up a retirement home with 80 beds.

Hu Lanqi died in Chengdu on 13 December 1994, at the age of 93.

== Memoir ==
In the 1980s Hu wrote a detailed memoir of her life, in which she harshly criticized her own politics. She described herself as "immature", relying on "enthusiasm rather than analysis", which pushed her to "join whatever cause that struck her as just". She also considered the Red Guards who had tormented her during the Cultural Revolution similarly immature and easily manipulated. Her memoir rarely mentions Mao Zedong, but frequently praises Premier Zhou Enlai, as many other writers did after the Cultural Revolution, contrasting the vengeful Mao with the humane Zhou. She explicitly criticized the morality of Chen Yi for the way he treated her in 1949.

== Bibliography ==
- Dooling, Amy D. (2005). Writing Women in Modern China: The Revolutionary Years, 1936–1976 (PDF). Columbia University Press. ISBN 978-0-231-13216-9. Archived from the original (PDF) on 2016-06-09.
- Liu, Lu (June 2010). "On the Front: Women Confronting War" (PDF). New Zealand Journal of Asian Studies. 12 (1): 29–45. Archived from the original (PDF) on 2016-01-21.
- Stapleton, Kristin Eileen (2008). "Hu Lanqi: Rebellious Woman, Revolutionary Soldier, Discarded Heroine, and Triumphant Survivor". In Hammond, Kenneth James; Stapleton, Kristin Eileen (eds.). The Human Tradition in Modern China. Rowman & Littlefield. pp. 157–176. ISBN 978-0-7425-5466-5.
