= The Young Companion =

Shanghai-based magazine, published 1926–1945

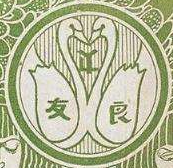

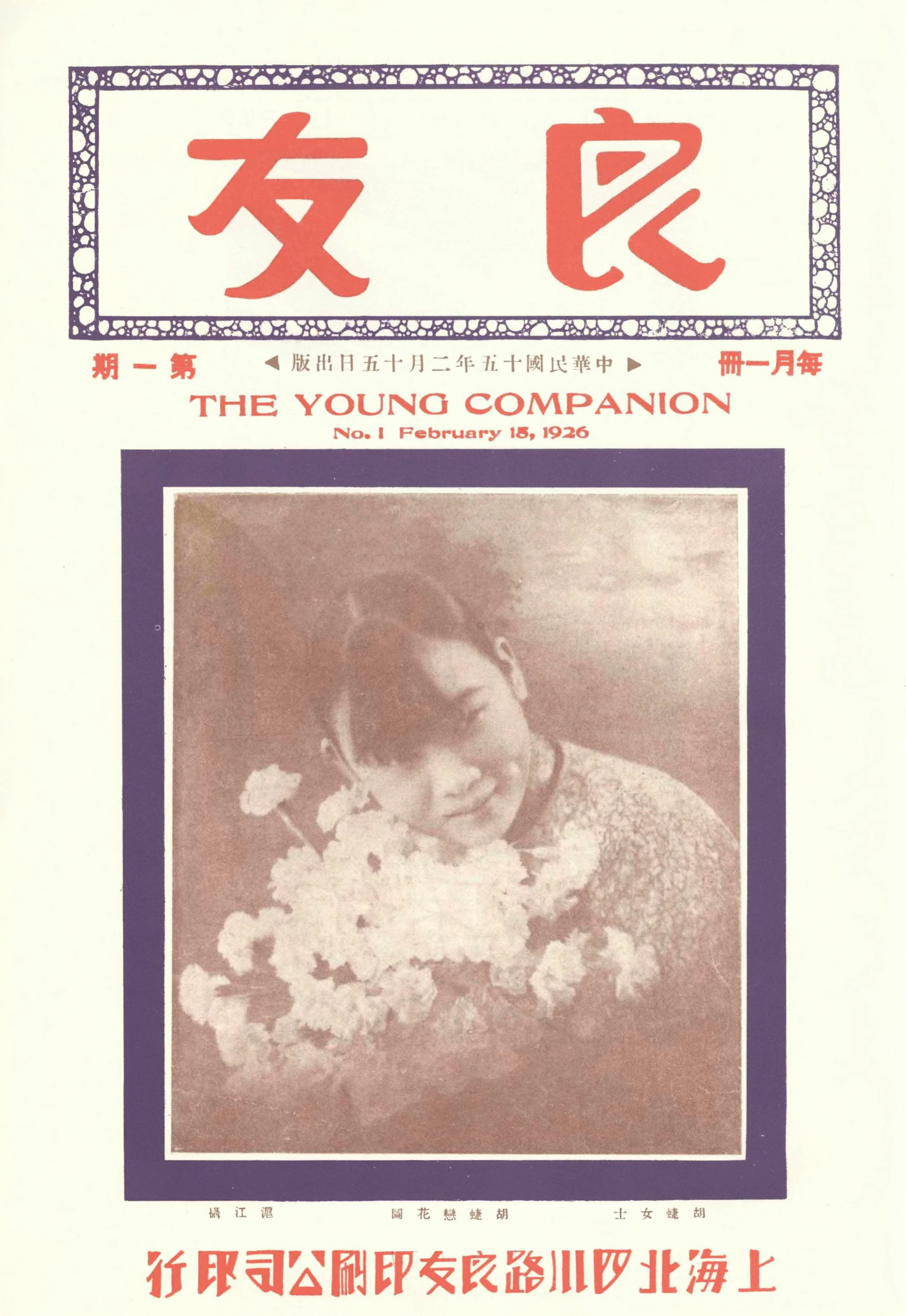
- First issue, 15 February 1926, featuring actress Hu Die
- Editor-in-Chief: Zhang Yiheng
- Former editors: Ma Guoliang; Liang Desuo; Zhou Shoujuan; Wu Liande
- Frequency: Weekly
- Founded: 1926
- First issue: 15 February 1926
- Final issue: October 1945
- Country: China
- Based in: Shanghai (Hong Kong and Chongqing during WWII)
- Language: Chinese, English

The Young Companion, known as Liángyǒu (Chinese: 良友; pinyin: Liángyǒu; Wade–Giles: Liang-yu) in Chinese, was a pictorial magazine with captions in both Chinese and English, published in Shanghai beginning February 1926. Although the direct translation of Liangyou is "Good Companion", the magazine bore the English name The Young Companion on the cover. Referred to by historian Yajun Mo as an "iconic magazine" and "a visual shortcut for 'old Shanghai'", the magazine has proven useful in modern times to examine the glamorous side of colonial-era Shanghai. It may have been the most influential large-scale comprehensive pictorial in the 1920s, at least in Asia. It ceased publication in 1945. There were 174 issues in total, which includes the two special issues not given monthly issue numbers, the Sun Yat-sen Memorial Special Issue and the Eighth Anniversary issue. Since 1945, it has been repeatedly reestablished, but the impact has not been the same.

The magazine ran a mixture of content – including photography, art, and text – and covered a multitude of topics, including news, politics, culture, economy, lifestyle, and sports.

The magazine was known for its cover-girls, beautiful women who appeared to be active, "modern girls in motion". The motion was really performed by the girls inside the magazine playing sports, while the cover-girls presented modern women, attractive to men in their Western outfits and implied activities.

The women were modern girls, appearing to not be dressed up looking for men, but living their lives and doing what they enjoyed doing. The modern girls of Shanghai appeared in the city's artwork, including magazines such as The Young Companion and Ling Long, but also in the advertisements of the city and calendars. They were shown as actively living their lives, "driving motorcycles, swimming, horse riding, horse racing, rowing competitions, and participating in social assistance."

The cover of issue 45 depicts Guan Zilan, a Chinese painter who studied in Japan in the late 1920s, and who also received coverage in Japanese media as a model for "modern" women.

Modern scholar Maura Elizabeth Cunningham points out that in spite of the idea of the independence of the modern girl circulating in the period, the magazine showed women how women's sports could be used to satisfy the male gaze and give examples of a "model of femininity for female viewers to reproduce". She also pointed out that the magazine showed progress, with pictures inside the magazine not only showing beauty, but also women actively doing sports, something unimaginable a generation earlier.

== Gallery ==
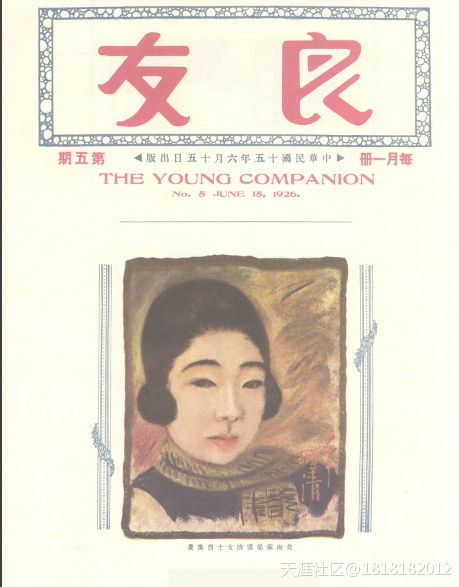
Painter Liang Xueqing on issue #5, June 1926. She later edited Wen Hwa.

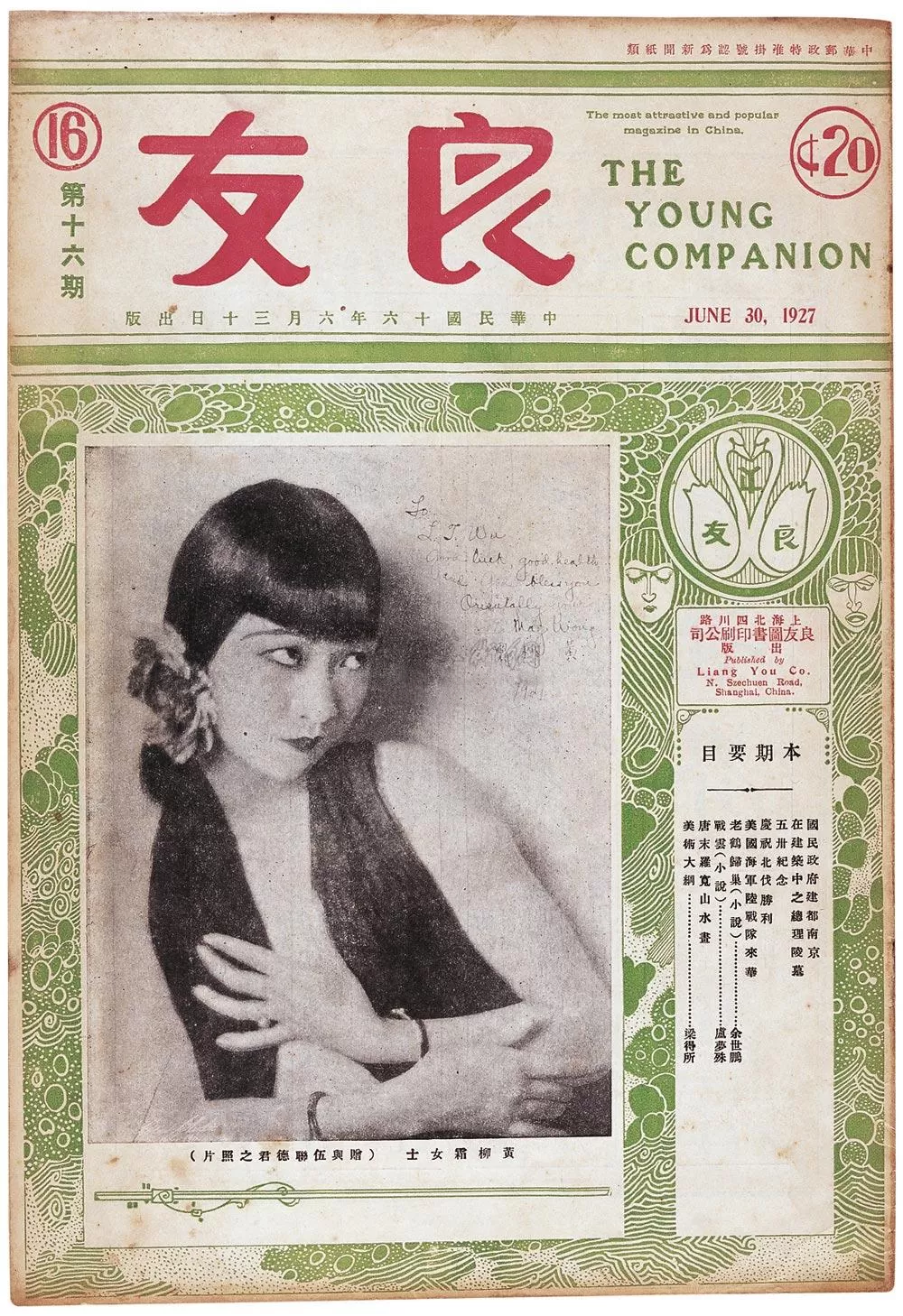
Actress Anna May Wong on issue #16, 1927

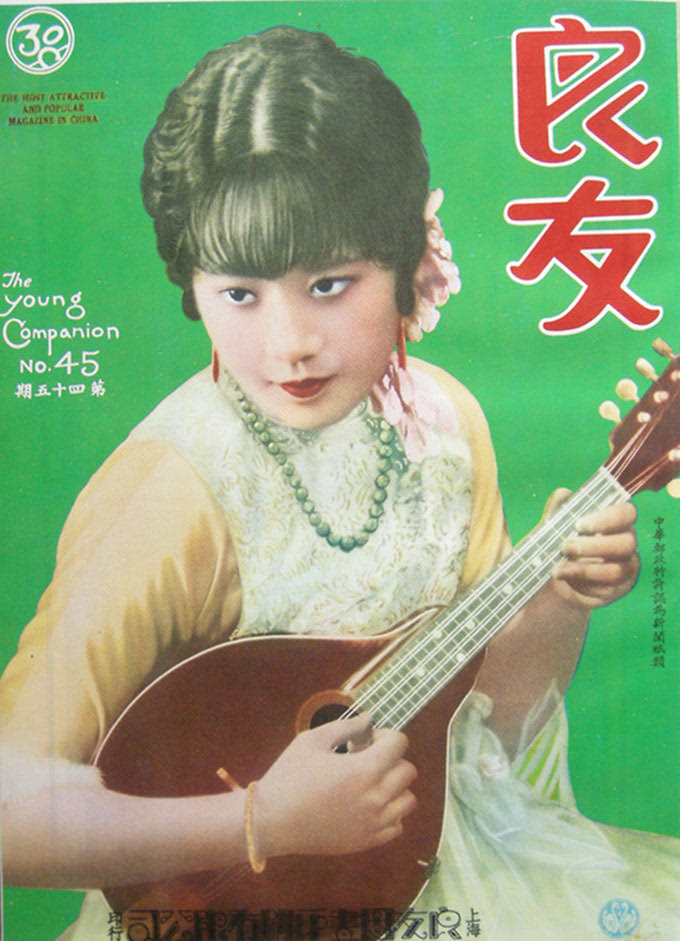
Painter Guan Zilan with mandolin on issue #45, 1930

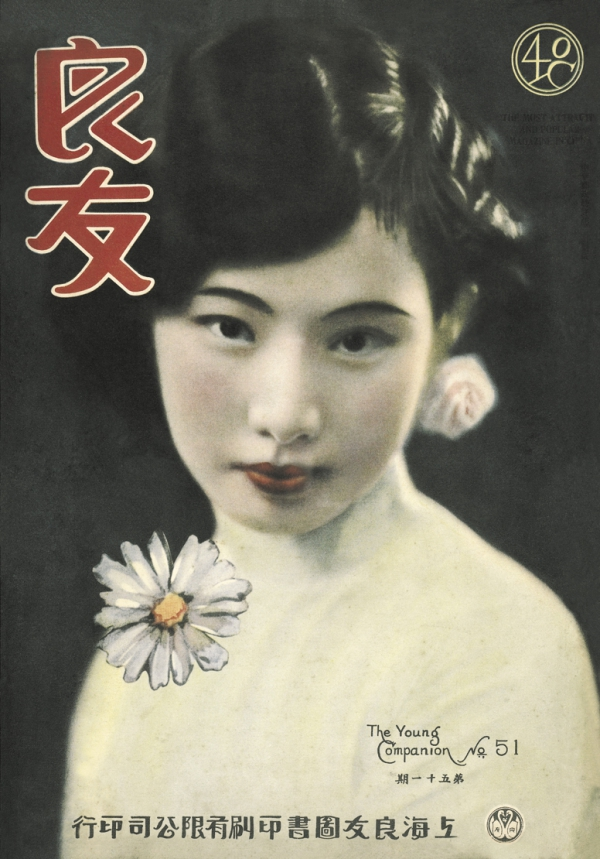
Actress Chen Bo'er on issue #51, 1930

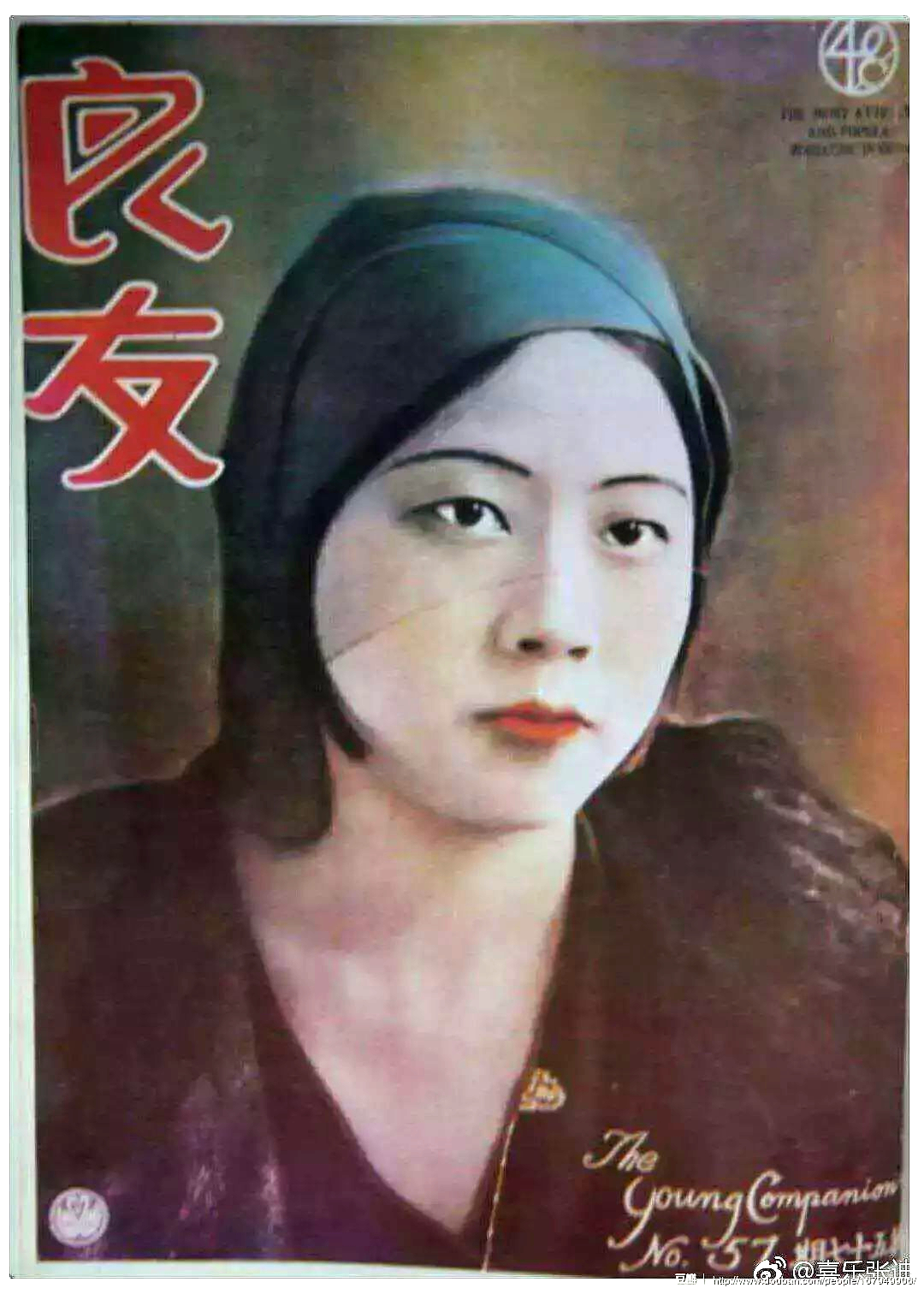
Painter Georgette Chen on issue #57, 1931

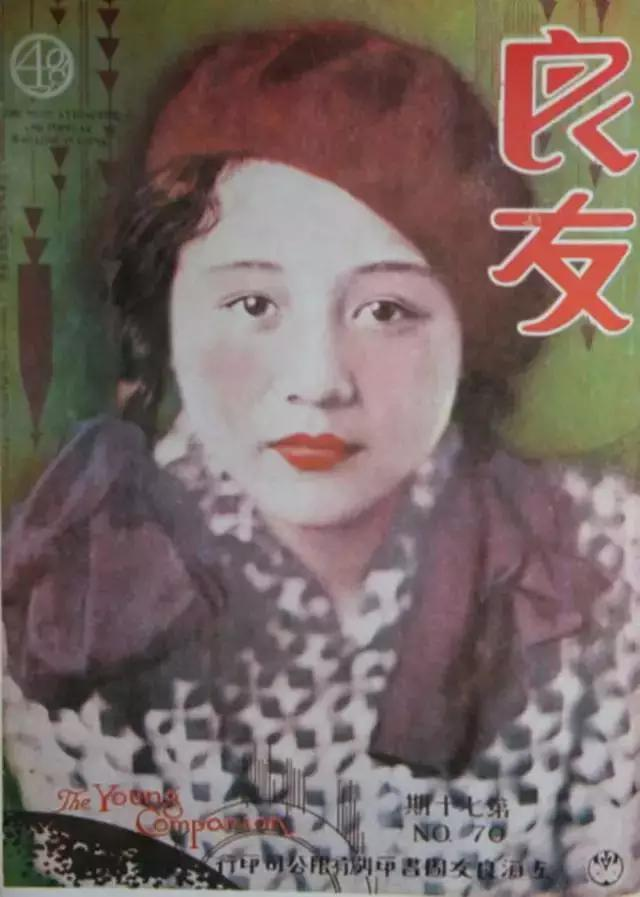
Writer and military leader, Hu Lanqi on issue #70, 1932

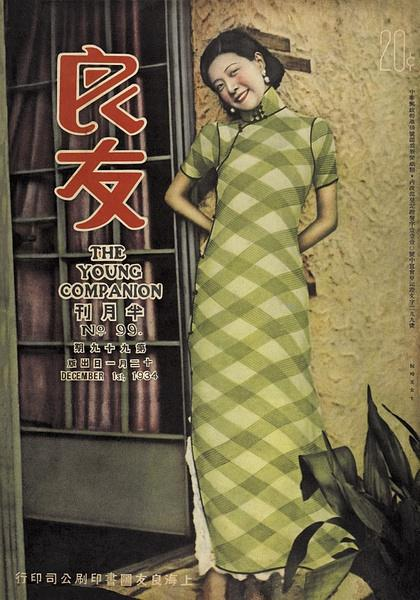
Actress Ruan Lingyu on issue #99, December 1934

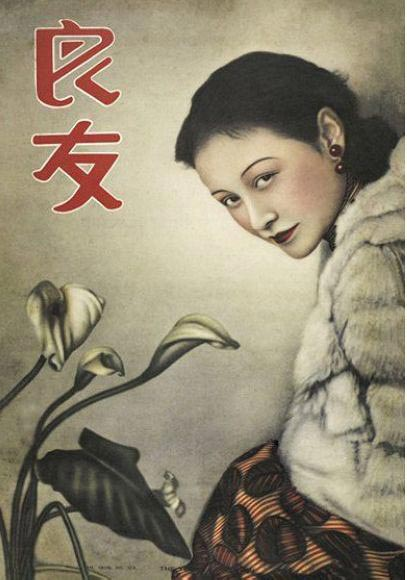
Actress Mei Lin on issue #113, 1936

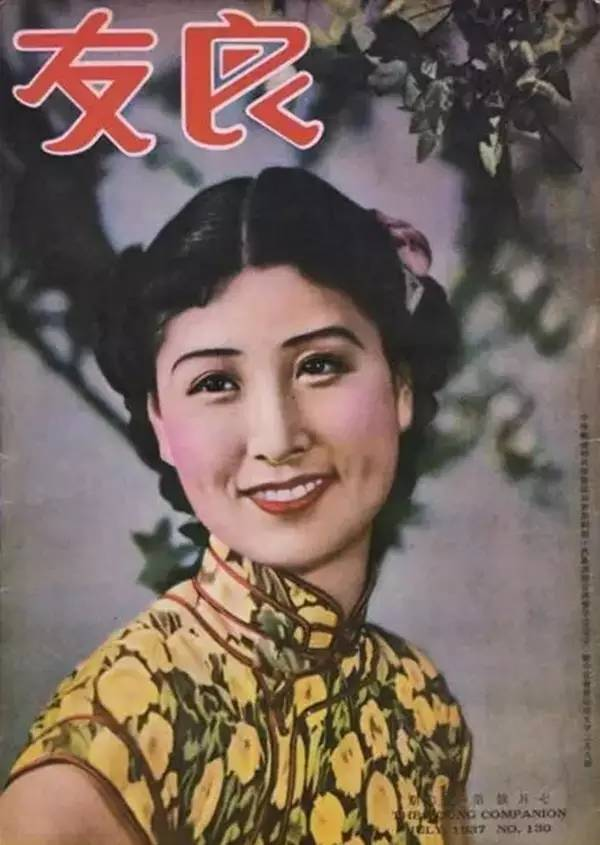
Socialite and spy Zheng Pingru on issue #130, 1937

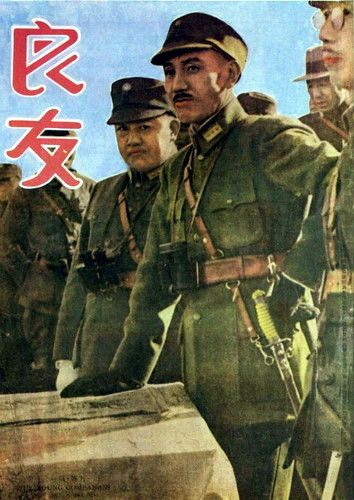
Example of war years, issue #131, 1937 featuring Chiang Kai-shek

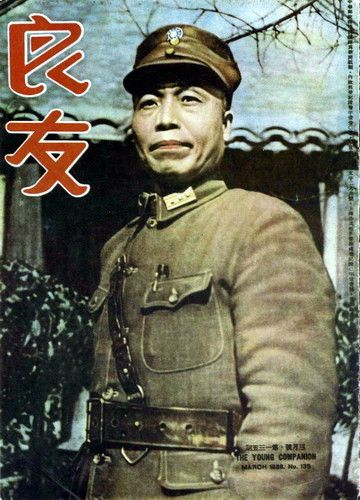
Warlord Li Zongren, commander of the New Guangxi Clique, on issue #135, 1938

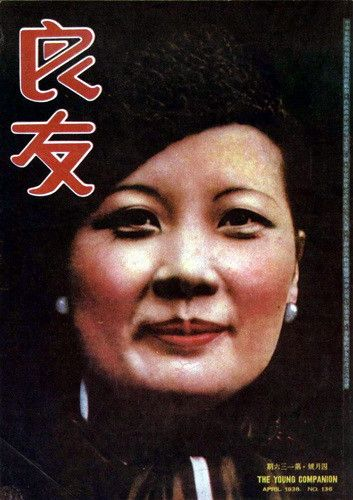
First Lady Soong Mei-ling as Deputy Commander of the Republic of China Air Force on issue #136, 1938

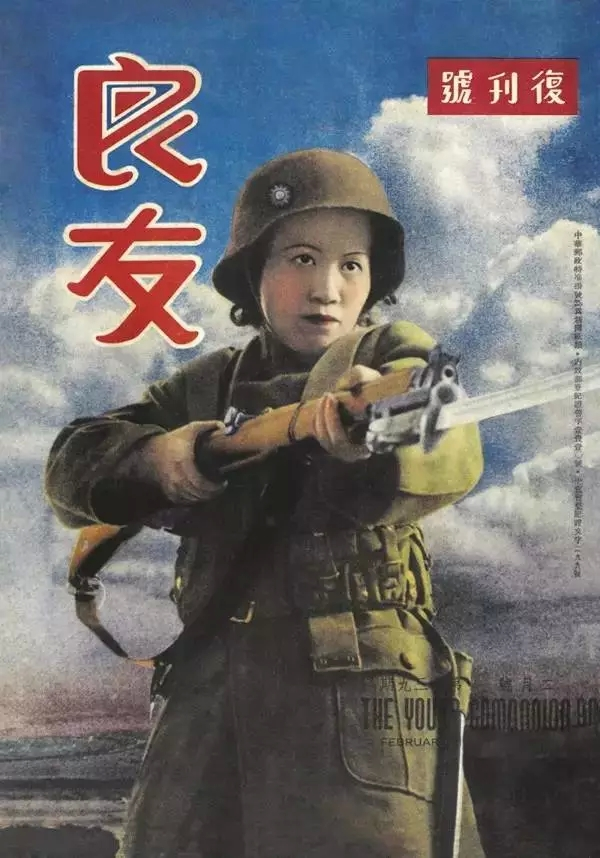
"New Era Chinese Woman", issue #139, 1939

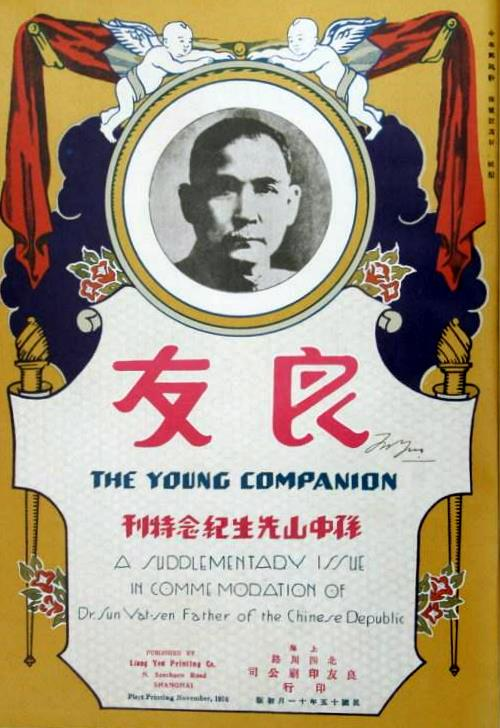
Sun Yat-sen Memorial Special Issue
