= The Stormy Night (1925 film) =

1925 film

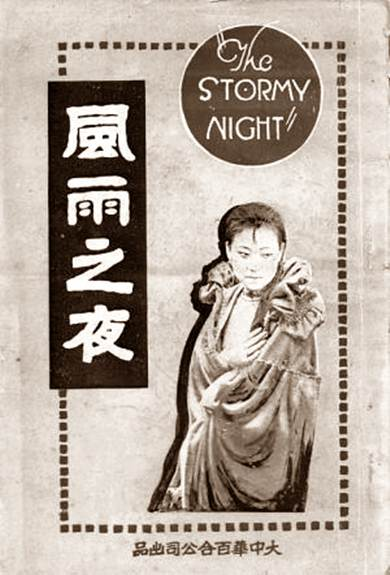
- Original poster
- Traditional Chinese: 風雨之夜
- Simplified Chinese: 风雨之夜
- Hanyu Pinyin: Fēngyǔ Zhī Yè
- Directed by: Zhu Shouju
- Written by: Zhu Shouju
- Starring: Han Yunzhen; Zhou Wenzhu
- Cinematography: S.M. Chow
- Production company: Great China Lilium Pictures
- Release date: December 13, 1925 (China)
- Running time: 101 minutes
- Country: Republic of China
- Languages: Silent film, with Chinese and English intertitles

The Stormy Night is a 1925 Chinese drama film directed and written by novelist Zhu Shouju. Like most Chinese films from this period, it is a black-and-white silent film with both Chinese and English intertitles.

The film was long believed lost, until a print resurfaced in Tokyo, Japan in 2006, which was finally identified in 2011.

== Rediscovery ==
In 2006, descendants of Japanese director Teinosuke Kinugasa donated his collection to the National Museum of Modern Art, Tokyo. In it museum workers discovered a Chinese film (since it had Chinese intertitles), but as the title is missing they were unable to identify it right away. Many years later, Akinari Sato (佐藤秋成) convincingly confirmed it as The Stormy Night by matching it with reports from old Shanghai newspapers Shen Bao and Xinwen Bao (新聞報). Because reports mentioned the film as having 9 reels, and 8 reels are found, Sato believed that no more than 10 minutes could be missing.

The film underwent a digital restoration in 2017 and began screening in China the same year.

== Cast ==
- Han Yunzhen as Mrs. Zhuang
- Zhou Wenzhu
- Wang Shiyan
- Wang Yingzhi
- Yang Jingwo as Yujie
- Bao Mengjiao as Bian Ziming
- Wang Cilong as Doctor
- Li Minghui as Cover girl
- Gong Jianong as Club patron
- Yan Bingheng as Qian Dawei
- Ye Zhongfang as Sleepwalker
- Wang Guoqi as Jiaona

== Reception ==
In 2017, Japanese scholar Fumitoshi Karima (刈間文俊) called this film one of the three Chinese films that amazed him, along with silent-era masterpieces The Goddess and Love and Duty. In 2018, Shelly Kraicer called it an "astonishing revelation" on Twitter.
