= Xie Caizhen =

Chinese actress, writer and film director

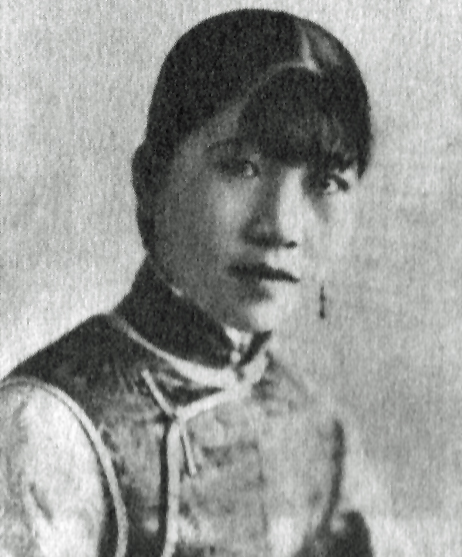
- Born: Unknown
- Died: Unknown
- Occupation(s): Actress, director, writer
- Years active: 1920s-1930s

Xie Caizhen
- Chinese: 谢采真
Transcriptions
Standard Mandarin
- Hanyu Pinyin: xiè cǎizhēn
Yue: Cantonese
- Jyutping: ze6^{6} coi^{2} zan^{1}

Xie Caizhen (Chinese: 谢采真; pinyin: xiè cǎi zhēn) was a Chinese actress, writer and film director recognised to be the first woman in China to direct a film. Other than her appearance in three films and her one directorial role, little is known about her life prior to or following her film career. However, she had a sister, a father who did support her career, and was born in Hankou, in January, sometime in the 1900s. The film she directed and which she also wrote and appeared in was named An Orphan's Cry (孤雏悲声) (1925).

Xie was active during the 1920s and 1930s silent era of film and originally worked at the Shanghai Shadow Play Company which was established in 1920 by early Chinese film director Dan Duyu. Here she was cast in two films by Duyu, Return to the Hometown (重返故乡) (1925) and Little Master (小公子) (1925).

Later she is said to have worked for a short-lived production company run by director Li Jiran called Nanxing Film Company where she gained her directorial debut. The film which was the company's only feature produced during its lifetime was called An Orphan's Cry (孤雏悲声) (1925) and was a melodrama involving a dysfunctional family. Upon the film's release it is said to have caused a sensation among audiences owing to the director being female and the film's complex storyline.

Xie Caizhen disappeared from newspaper headlines after 1926, however a tiny section on the Da gong wan bao (大公晚報) Newspaper from 1944 has a section about her.

Her husband was Y.C Zai.

== Bibliography ==
- Tan, Ye; Yun, Zhu (2012). Historical Dictionary of Chinese Cinema. Scarecrow Press. ISBN 9780810879133.
- Zhang, Yingjin (2012). A Companion to Chinese Cinema. Wiley-Blackwell. ISBN 978-1444330298.
- Wang, Lingzhen (2011). Chinese Women's Cinema: Transnational Contexts. Columbia University Press. ISBN 9780231527446.
- Taylor, Kate (2012). Dekalog 4: On East Asian Filmmakers. Wallflower Press. ISBN 978-1906660314.
