= Don't Change Your Husband (1929 film) =

1929 film

- Chinese: 情海重吻
- Literal meaning: Kissing Again in the Sea of Love
- Hanyu Pinyin: Qíng Hǎi Chóng Wěn
- Directed by: Y.C Zai
- Starring: Wang Naidong; Tang Tianxiu
- Cinematography: S.M. Chow; P.H. Yuen
- Edited by: P.S. Ting
- Production company: Great China Lilium Pictures
- Release date: 1929
- Running time: ~62 minutes
- Country: Republic of China
- Languages: Silent film, with Chinese and English intertitles

Don't Change Your Husband, also known as Kisses Once, is a 1929 Chinese drama film directed by Y.C Zai (Xie Yunqing or Xie Yonglan) who also acted in the film. It is likely adapted from the Hollywood movie of the same name. Like most Chinese films from this period, it is a black-and-white silent film with both Chinese and English intertitles. An English re-translation of the original Chinese intertitles is available on YouTube.

== Plot ==
Don't Change Your Husband (1929)

On the day he is laid off, Qiping receives a letter and discovers that his wife Lijun is in love with a rich college student named Chen Mengtian. He is infuriated. Lijun runs off to Chen's house, but sees Chen date another woman. Meanwhile, her mother receives the news from Qiping's angry mother and brings her home. Lijun's mother summons Chen to her house to discuss the matter. Soon Qiping receives a letter from a private attorney asking him to come in to sign the divorce papers. In the attorney's office, Qiping and Lijun are too emotional to finalize the divorce, but Qiping's mother and Chen sign the papers for them. Lijun feels inadequate with Chen, who is a playboy. Meanwhile, Qiping misses her dearly.

One day, Lijun's father returns home from business to celebrate his 50th birthday, oblivious that the divorce has happened. Lijun's mother invites Qiping to the banquet, and Qiping accepts. At the banquet, he sees Lijun for the first time after a long separation and becomes sad, which puzzles Lijun's father. Qiping finally reveals the truth to Lijun's father. At this time, Chen receives a letter from his father, who having gotten wind of his licentious ways, demands that he return to his hometown to get married. Chen thus abandons Lijun and his house. When Lijun's father arrives at Chen's house, Lijun has fainted.

A doctor assures Lijun's parents that her condition isn't serious. The father decides that the best solution is to reunite Qiping with Lijun, so he sends Lijun back to Qiping's house. When Lijun wakes up, she feels very ashamed before Qiping and his mother, so she runs away again. Qiping follows her to the beach, where Lijun tries to kill herself by jumping into the sea. Qiping stops her and declares that he still loves her. Lijun tells him how remorseful she feels.

== Cast ==
- Wang Naidong (Lyton Wong) as Qiping (Chi Ping)
- Tang Tianxiu (T.S. Tong) as Lijun, Qiping's wife
- Chen Yitang as Chen Mengtian (Chen Mong Tien), Lijun's lover
- Yang Aizhen as Qiping's mother
- Wang Xieyan as Lijun's mother
- Xie Yunqing (Y.C. Zai) as Lijun's father
- Cui Tiansheng as Attorney Cui (Attorney Chay, Attorney Tsai)
- Wu Yixiao as Ah Fu (Ah Foh), a servant from Lijun's family
