= Zhou Shoujuan =

Chinese novelist, screenwriter and translator

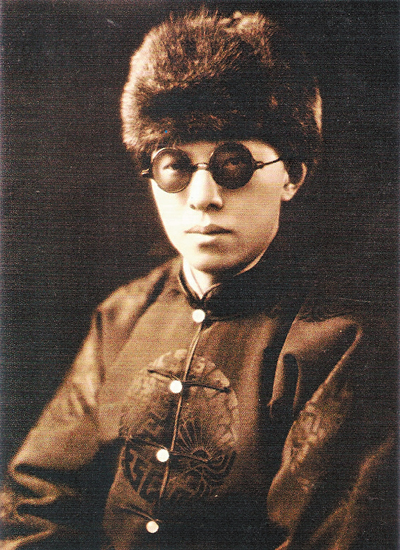
Zhou Shoujuan, c. 1930

Zhou Shoujuan 周瘦鵑 (30 June 1895 – 11 August 1968), born Zhou Zufu, courtesy name Guoxian, also known by his English name Eric Chow, was a Chinese novelist, screenwriter, literary editor, and English–to-Chinese literary translator.

== Career ==
From 1911 to 1947, Zhou translated around 200 short stories from English into the Chinese language. Zhou introduced the works of Daniel Defoe, Charles Dickens, Mark Twain, Washington Irving, Harriet Beecher Stowe and many others to Chinese readers. In September 1913, Zhou was the editor of Unfettered Talk, a supplement of Shenbao. Zhou wrote hundreds of stories and some film scripts. Zhou edited magazines including "Weekly" weekly magazine, Dadong Bookstore "Half Moon" magazine (later renamed "Violet" and "New Family"), "Purple Orchid", and "Liangyou pictorial".

Zhou was a significant figure in the Mandarin Ducks and Butterflies genre. Zhou defended the style in the 1920s when it was heavily criticised. He continued to defend it throughout his career.

Zhou's first love had the Western name "Violet". Ultimately she married a different, wealthy, suitor. The name "Violet" became a motif for Zhou, who used it as the name of a literary journal (founded in 1925), in another journal consisting only of his own writings called Fallen Violet Petals, and the 1956 essay My Endless Love of Violet.

== Personal life ==
During the Chinese Cultural Revolution and on August 11, 1968, Zhou committed suicide by jumping into a well hours after a struggle session against him.

== Works translated into English ==
Year	Chinese title	Translated English title	Translator
1914	行再相見	"We Shall Meet Again"	Perry Link
1917	紅顏知己	"Charming Confidante"	Cheuk Wong
1921	留聲機片	"The Phonograph Record"	Andrew F. Jones
	對鄰的小樓	"The Little Apartment Across the Way"	Richard King
1923	『快活』祝詞	"Congratulations to Happy Magazine"	Gilbert Fung

== Filmography ==
Zhou Shoujuan wrote the screenplays for these films:

Year	English title	Chinese title	Director	Notes
1924	Connected by Water and Fire	水火鴛鴦	Cheng Bugao	Lost
1926	Return the Money	還金記	Dan Duyu	Lost
1926	Ma Jiefu	馬介甫	Zhu Shouju	Lost, based on Strange Stories from a Chinese Studio

== See also ==
- Mandarin Ducks and Butterflies
