= Liang Xueqing =

Chinese painter

- 梁雪清
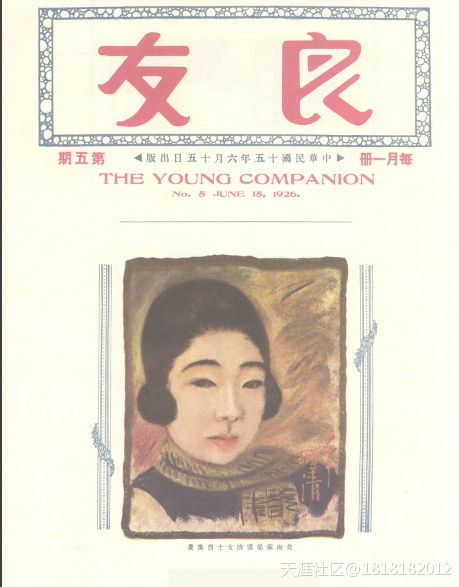
- Self-painted portrait of Liang Xueqing on the cover of Liangyou, also known as The Young Companion, issue number 5, June 1926
- Born: Liang Hsüch-ch'ng; 1890; Guangdong, Shunde District

Liang Xueqing (Chinese: 梁雪清), also known as Liang Hsüch-ch'ng, was the sister of three well-known Chinese painters and illustrators from the 1930s and 40s. She was an editor for the Wen Hwa or Culture Arts Review pictorial in the 1930s and was a rarity for promoting female painters in that era. She herself was a painter, from Guangdong, who gained some recognition in 1926, when her self-portrait was published on the front page of the Young Companion, issue 5, a prominent news and cultural pictorial, based in Shanghai and read internationally. She was the first painter on a Liangyou cover as well as the first female painter to be in the pictorial at all, making issue 2. She also had a painting published in issue 3, called Children's Music (兒樂) She painted with oil paints. and with watercolors. She was the author of the 1934 book The picture history of the great changes of the Northeast and the tears (東北巨變血淚大畫史), about the war resisting the Japanese.

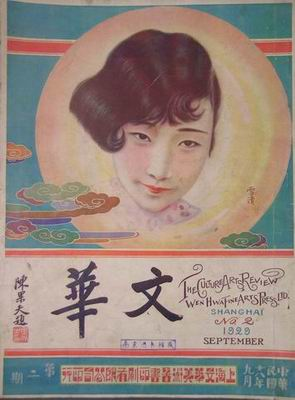
Example of a cover (issue 2) of Wenhua magazine from 1929

Liang came from a family of artists. Three brothers, as well as three nieces were all into art. In 1924, her brothers Liang Dingming (梁鼎铭), Liang Youming (梁又铭), and Liang Zhongming (梁中铭), were active members of the painting circles in Shanghai and founded the Tianhua Art Association (天化艺术会), of which she too was a member. She may have joined her brothers in founding the association. Liangyou introduced the group in its pages, one of the first art groups to receive such attention. The group also participated in the Shanghai Union Art Exhibition in 1927, exhibiting artwork.

Liang Xueqing had a professional life, working in the advertising department "of a major company," and he also worked with her brother Dingming who edited the Cultural Pictorial with her. Dingming would become well known for his military art, in particular the mural paintings Huizhou Campaign, (about a battle in 1925, part of the founding of the Republic of China (1912–1949)) which resides in the Taipei Museum of History in Taiwan. Xueqing herself also did military paintings, including "One Day After One Two Eight Eight", which showed the results of Japanese bombing Shanghai. Among her non-military named-paintings are "Lunch" and "Red Snow White", which the Soka Art Center said "pay attention to the meaning of brushwork texture." The center further characterized her work as "smart and free" with "pursuit of a charm in the meaning," using "beautiful and loud" colors.

While her fate is not publicized, her brothers and nieces moved to Taiwan in the 1940s.
