= Wang Naidong =

Chinese actor

- Traditional Chinese: 王乃東
- Simplified Chinese: 王乃东
Transcriptions
Standard Mandarin
- Hanyu Pinyin: Wáng Nǎidōng

Wang Naidong (fl. 20th century), also known as Lyton Wong, was a Chinese actor active from 1925 to 1957 in the cinema of Shanghai and British Hong Kong. He starred in many silent films produced by Great China Lilium Pictures (大中華百合影片公司), but is probably best remembered today for playing the male lead in the 1935 Lianhua Film Company classic New Women opposite Ruan Lingyu.

== Life ==
Wang Naidong was born either in Nanking, or Hankou, Hubei, at an unknown date between 1898-1900 into a relatively wealthy family; his father, Wang Siming, served as a general in the Han Green Standard Army. His family also managed a tea export business. Wang had five siblings and received his education at Wuhan No. 7 Western School. He trained in traditional Chinese theatre under Chu Shen-Wei and began performing in local cabarets and theatres at age 16. He also worked as a middle school teacher for some time.

Wang began his film career in 1925, appearing in minor roles in silent films. His first credited appearances included Mother’s Happiness (1926) and The Miserable Life of Qiu Xiang (1926). He gained recognition with the lead role in Don’t Change Your Husband (1929).

During the 1930s and early 1940s, Wang appeared in several notable films, including New Women (1935), Song of Everlasting Regret (1936), Maiden in Armour (1939), Dayu Sha Jia (1940), and Qiu Haitang (1943). He collaborated with directors such as Cai Chusheng, Shi Dongshan, and Bu Wancang, and worked alongside actresses including Ruan Lingyu.

Amid the Japanese occupation of Shanghai, Wang relocated to Hong Kong around 1941, where he acted in films such as The Marriage Trap (1941), Song Girl Red Peony (1941), and A Prostitute and a General (1941). He also participated in theater troupes during wartime production halts. His last known film role was in Love of Fermented Rice (1944), and he served as producer for The Perfect Beauty (1940). Wang Naidong joined the South China Star Drama Troupe in January 1942, and was a primary actor. During the Japanese occupation, he unwillingly collaborated, which led the Kuomintang to issue a death warrant should he return to China. After the war, Wang's life is obscure, with his last known role was Sar Kua Chew Ai (1957). It was frequently thought he disappeared from records after 1944.

== Filmography ==
Year	English title	Original title	Role	Notes
1923	The Widow Wants to Remarry	古井重波記		
1925	Catkin Sorrow	楊花恨		
1926	Debt Circles	連環債		
1926	Mother's Happiness	兒孫福	Second son	
1926	Family's Heirloom	傳家寶	Wu Mutian	
1926	Ma Jiefu	馬介甫	Ma Jiefu	
1926	Visiting the In-Laws	探親家	Wang Zhiyi	
1927	Sex Trap	美人計		
1927	Four Heroes of the Wangs	王氏四俠		
1927	Redress a Grievance	烏盆記	Liu Shichang's soul	
1927	The Miserable Life of Qiu Xiang	可憐的秋香	Qiu Sheng	
1928	A Shanghai Dancing-Girl	上海一舞女		
1928	That Is Me	就是我		
1928	The Ridiculous Swordsman	荒唐劍客		
1929	Don't Change Your Husband	情海重吻	Qiping	
1934	Floating Flowers	飛花村		
1934	Women	女人	Ji Juesheng	
1935	New Women	新女性	Dr. Wang	
1935	Lady Pear Blossom	梨花夫人		
1935	Man at Birth	人之初	Huang Zijing	
1935	Burden of Living	生之哀歌		
1935	Hero of the Times	時事英雄		
1935	Tempest	暴風雨		
1936	Bloodshed on a Wedding	新婚大血案		
1936	Song of Regret	長恨歌	Yu Peilan	
1936	Tomboy	化身姑娘	Yuan Baojun	
1936	Tomboy 2	化身姑娘續集		
1937	A Mystical Flower	神秘之花		
1937	All Loves	滿園春色		
1937	Lovers	海天情侶		
1937	The Big Robbery No.303	三零三大劫案		
1937	Night Rains at Xiaoxiang	瀟湘夜雨		
1938	Women	女人		
1938	A Pair in Love	鳳求凰		
1939	The Love of a Woman	潘巧雲	Yang Xiong	
1939	Groans and Struggles	碧玉雄心	Wang Zhiqun	
1939	Mysterious Lady	神秘夫人		
1939	A Fair Actress	影城記	Guan Peng	
1939	Xiang Yu the Conqueror	楚霸王	Zhang Liang	
1939	Ape in Disguise	化身人猿		
1939	Tomboy 3	化身姑娘第三集		
1939	Tomboy 4	化身姑娘第四集		
1939	Hong Kong Song Girl	香江歌女		
1940	The Adventures of Chinese Tarzan	中國泰山歷險記		
1940	The Perfect Beauty	絕代佳人	Li Zicheng	also producer
1940	Revolt of the Fishing Folks	打漁殺家		
1940	The Gardener and a Lady	薛仁貴與柳迎春		
1941	The Marriage Trap	美人計	Liu Bei	
1941	A Prostitute and a General	賽金花	Alfred von Waldersee	
1941	The Sparrow Flies East and South	孔雀東南飛		
1941	Ancient Kingdom of Human Freaks	古國人妖		
1941	Song Girl Red Peony	歌女紅牡丹		
1943	Under the Roofs of Shanghai	上海屋簷下		
1943	Peach Blossom Pond	桃花潭水		
1943	Torrent	激流		
1943	The Story of Qiu Haitang	秋海棠	Yuan Shaowen	2-part film
1944	The Hero and the Beauty	英雄美人		
1944	Love of Fermented Rice	麴海情濤		
1944	Return of the Phoenix	鳳還巢		
