= Mother's Happiness =

1926 film

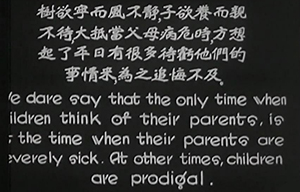
- A screenshot
- Traditional Chinese: 兒孫福
- Simplified Chinese: 儿孙福
- Literal meaning: Fortunes of Descendants
- Hanyu Pinyin: Ér Sūn Fú
- Directed by: Shi Dongshan
- Written by: Zhu Shouju
- Starring: Zhou Wenzhu; Wang Cilong; Wang Naidong; Fu Jianqin
- Cinematography: S.M. Chow; S.S. Yue
- Production companies: Yueming Film Company; Great China Lilium Pictures
- Release date: August 13, 1926 (China)
- Running time: ~48 minutes (extant version, incomplete)
- Country: Republic of China
- Languages: Silent film, with Chinese and English intertitles

Mother's Happiness (simplified Chinese: 儿孙福; traditional Chinese: 兒孫福; pinyin: Ér Sūn Fú; lit. 'Fortunes of Descendants') is a 1926 Chinese drama film directed by Shi Dongshan and written by Zhu Shouju, starring Zhou Wenzhu as a devoted rural mother who reared 4 children by herself after her husband died from an accident. It is one of the earliest extant Chinese films, but a portion is still missing. Like most Chinese films from this period, it is a black-and-white silent film with both Chinese and English intertitles.

The English title is ironic, because the mother in the story hardly enjoyed any happiness in her life.

== Plot ==
Mother's Happiness (1926)

After the birth of her children, a rural mother becomes so devoted to them that she completely neglects her ill-tempered husband. When her baby becomes ill, she even tries to commit suicide, fortunately the baby recovers. Her husband, who works for a wealthy man, is blamed and fired after the man's son squanders twenty thousand dollars. He sulkily returns home, beats up his naughty son, and accidentally drinks himself to death with the wrong type of alcohol. After his death, the mother works as a seamstress and manages to send all her children to a private school. At school, the children are bullied by a kid from a wealthy family, but the teacher never punishes him.

(Part missing)

Decades later, the children are all married. The eldest son has a crude wife who disrespects the mother. The second daughter-in-law is respectful but unhealthy. The eldest daughter lives in a wealthy household with servants, but she is completely unfilial. Even when she returns home for brief visits (just to impress the neighbors, as she says), she treats the entire family with contempt. Another daughter, who is widowed, also lives away from home.

Both sons set off for jobs in the city, and the mother is left behind with the second daughter-in-law. The eldest son wants to send money home but is stopped by his stern wife. He gives the money to his brother to send home, but the second son squanders all the money on a lascivious woman. With no income to pay the rent, the mother and the second daughter-in-law have to seek shelter with her eldest daughter. The daughter accepts them, but calls them servants in front of her friends. Her ill-tempered husband is disgusted by the mother's impoverished appearance and lashes out at her.

The second son loses his job as a result of persistent tardiness and poor performance. He tries to borrow money from his mistress but discovers that she has a new lover who happens to be his best friend. Meanwhile, the mother is driven away from her daughter's house and comes to the city to visit the brothers. Eventually she falls terminally ill, and all her children reunite before her deathbed. The mother tells the second son to kneel in front of his wife, and is pleased that he finally repents.

== Cast ==
- Zhou Wenzhu as Mother
- Xie Yunqing (Y.C. Zai) as Father
- Wang Cilong as Eldest son
- Yang Jingwo as Eldest daughter-in-law
- Wang Naidong (Lyton Wong) as Second son
- Lin Ying as Second daughter-in-law
- Fu Jianqin as Eldest daughter
- Wang Zhengxin as Eldest son-in-law
- Wang Xiuying as Second daughter
- Tang Tianxiu (T.S. Tong) as Lascivious woman

== Remakes ==
There have been two remakes, the 1937 film Song for a Mother (慈母曲) by Zhu Shilin, and the 1953 Hong Kong film A Mother Remembers (慈母淚) by Chun Kim.
