= Shi Dongshan =

Chinese film director and screenwriter

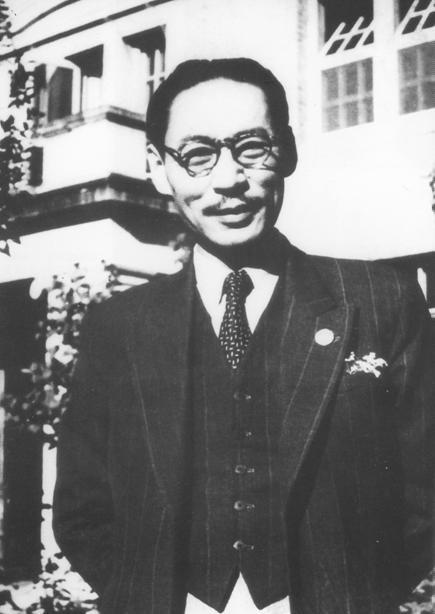
- Shi in the 1940s
- Born: Shi Kuangshao (史匡韶); December 29, 1902; Hangzhou, Zhejiang, Qing China
- Died: February 23, 1955 (aged 52); Beijing
- Occupations: Film director, screenwriter
- Years active: 1920s–1950s

Chinese name
- Traditional Chinese: 史東山
- Simplified Chinese: 史东山
Transcriptions
Standard Mandarin
- Hanyu Pinyin: Shǐ Dōngshān
- Wade–Giles: Shih Tung-shan

Shi Dongshan (December 29, 1902 – February 23, 1955), born Shi Kuangshao, was one of the most prominent film directors and screenwriters in pre-Communist China, together with Chen Liting, Cai Chusheng, and Zheng Junli. His most notable film was Eight Thousand Li of Cloud and Moon, released in 1947. He served in the Communist government after 1949, but was later persecuted and committed suicide in 1955.

== Career ==
Shi Dongshan was born and raised in Hangzhou, Zhejiang province. At the age of 17, he left his family and relocated to Zhangjiakou, finding brief work as a radio operator. He moved to Shanghai two years later, where he became a stage designer and occasional actor for the Shanghai Film Company (Chinese: 上海影戏公司; pinyin: Shanghai Yingxi Gongsi).

By the early 1930s, Shi was one of the leading directors for the left-leaning Lianhua Film Company, along with Cai Chusheng, Sun Yu and others. Shi would later join another left-leaning studio, Yihua Film Company, at the behest of the screenwriter Tian Han. Several years later, Shi had switched studios again. He directed several important works for the new Xinhua Film Company, notably an adaptation of the Nikolai Gogol's "The Government Inspector" entitled Night of the Debauche (1936), and the national-defense film, March of Youth (1937).

During the Second Sino-Japanese War, Shi fled to the interior of China with the Nationalist government, and directed propaganda films such as Protect Our Land (1938). After the war, Shi returned to Shanghai and helped found the Kunlun Film Company, the successor to Lianhua. It was with Kunlun that Shi directed perhaps his best known film, Eight Thousand Li of Cloud and Moon (1947). Shi would not regain the level of popularity as he would with his Kunlun films, and his final major work came after the Chinese Communist Revolution with New Heroes and Heroines (1951).

== Suicide ==
Shi lived in Hong Kong in 1948, but went to Beijing in 1949 to work for the newly founded People's Republic of China. He was appointed head of the Technology Committee of the Film Bureau of the Ministry of Culture, but never joined the Communist Party. He became the target of political criticism by late 1951, and committed suicide on 23 February 1955. According to his son, premier Zhou Enlai ordered the confiscation of his suicide note, and news of his suicide was suppressed.

== Selected filmography ==
Year	English Title	Chinese Title	Company	Notes
1925	Poplar Flowers Regret	楊花恨	Shanghai Film Company	Also known as Yanghua's Hate and Willow Catkins
1926	Mother's Happiness	兒孫福	Dazhonghua Baihe Film Company	
1926	Live on Love	同居之愛	Dazhonghua Baihe	
1931	Two Stars in the Milky Way	銀漢雙星	Lianhua Film Company	
1932	Facing the National Crisis	共赴國難	Lianhua	Co-directed with Cai Chusheng, Sun Yu, and Wang Cilong
1932	Struggles	奮鬥	Lianhua	
1934	Women	女人一畫	Yihua Film Company	
1936	Night of the Debauche	狂歡之夜	Xinhua Film Company	Adaption of Nikolai Gogol's The Government Inspector
1937	March of Youth	青年進行曲	Xinhua	
1938	Protect Our Land	保衛我們的土地		
1939	Good Husband	好丈夫		
1941	The Victory March	勝利行進曲		
1947	Eight Thousand Li of Cloud and Moon	八千里路雲和月	Kunlun Film Company	
1951	New Heroes and Heroines	新兒女英雄傳	Beijing Film Studio	
