= Eight Thousand Li of Cloud and Moon (film) =

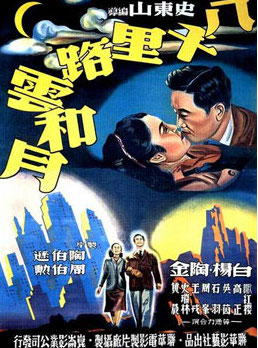
- Film poster
- Traditional Chinese: 八千里路雲和月
- Simplified Chinese: 八千里路云和月
- Hanyu Pinyin: Bāqiān lǐ lù yún hé yuè
- Directed by: Shi Dongshan; Wang Weiyi
- Written by: Shi Dongshan
- Produced by: Tao Boxun; Xia Yunhu; Zhou Boxun
- Starring: Bai Yang; Tao Jin
- Cinematography: Wu Tingfang
- Edited by: Fu Zhengyi; Han Zhongxia
- Music by: Shu Mo
- Production company: Kunlun Film Studio
- Release date: February 22, 1947 (China)
- Running time: 124 minutes
- Country: China
- Language: Mandarin

Eight Thousand Li of Cloud and Moon (simplified Chinese: 八千里路云和月; traditional Chinese: 八千里路雲和月; pinyin: Bāqiān lǐ lù yún hé yuè) is a 1947 Chinese film directed by Shi Dongshan and Wang Weiyi, starring Bai Yang and Tao Jin, two actors who were the leads in The Spring River Flows East released that same year. The film was selected as one of the 100 greatest 20th-century Chinese-language films chosen by Asia Weekly.

== Plot ==
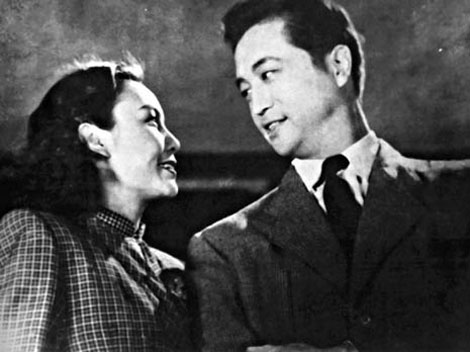
A scene from the film

Jiang Lingyu (Bai Yang), a female student who is studying in Shanghai, decides to join the Resistance Acting Troupe after Marco Polo Bridge Incident of 1937. Although dissuaded by her uncle, aunt and cousin, she adamantly leaves her uncle's home, where she has been staying, without telling them. The company arrives at Suzhou, Wuxi, Changzhou and Xuzhou and many other cities to perform for soldiers and ordinary folks alike.

For years the company perseveres with their arduous journey, with many of them falling sick. Finally they reach Chongqing, where musical instructor Gao Libin (Tao Jin) falls ill. Jiang remains behind to take care of him, where they receive news that Jiang's father has agreed to their marriage. They decide to get married once the war is over. Jiang's cousin, an entrepreneur, comes to see her. Soon, the troupe read from the papers that the Japanese has surrendered. Ecstatic, the couple gets married immediately.

The couple leaves the troupe to take a barge home. Postwar situation is bad, and they discover Jiang's father has died in the Jiangxi countryside before the war ended. They take up lodging at Jiang's uncle's mansion in Shanghai. They are disappointed at the self-centered, bourgeois attitude held by her uncle's family.

During Chinese New Year, a widow comes to visit Jiang's cousin. It turns out the widow has had her house forcibly occupied by her cousin. Indignant at this, Jiang and Gao decide to move out to a smaller, shabbier attic apartment scouted out by their friends. Gao becomes a schoolteacher and Jiang a journalist. Jiang becomes pregnant. She writes in her column about the incident of the widow and of her cousin's oppression. Jiang and her cousin later has a falling-out, and Jiang asserts that she will continue writing about such injustices in the papers.

Weak from overwork, Jiang faints on the streets one day and is brought to the hospital. Her fellow friends from the Troupe put together money for her hospital fees. Jiang has a premature delivery, but is nonetheless very weak. The doctor warns that she may not pull through; even if she does, she must be given good nutrition and a healthful living environment. Jiang, on her bed, asks her friends to help take care of her new-born child and is wheeled away. An intertitle then appears asking audiences to imagine what the ending is like: if Jiang's future is a dead end, it says, are the audiences themselves not all responsible since they are part of the society? The film ends with a giant question mark.
