= Sports Queen =

1934 film directed by Sun Yu

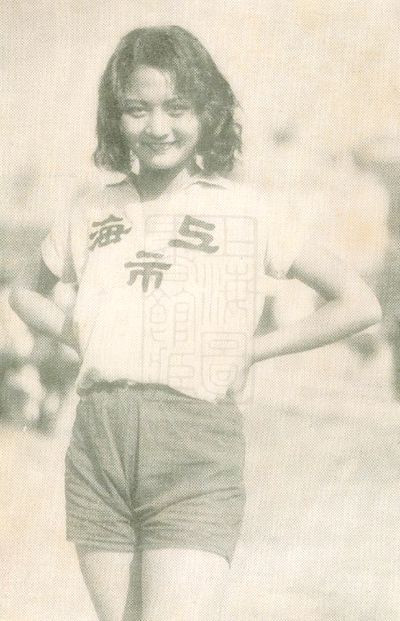
- Actress Li Lili in Sports Queen
- Directed by: Sun Yu
- Written by: Sun Yu
- Produced by: Lo Ming-yau; Lu Jie
- Starring: Li Lili
- Cinematography: Qiu Yiwei
- Production company: Lianhua Film Company
- Release date: April 14, 1934 (China)
- Running time: 89 minutes
- Country: China
- Language: Silent

Sports Queen (Chinese: 体育皇后; pinyin: Tǐyù Huánghòu), also known as Queen of Sports and The Athletic Queen, is a 1934 Chinese film directed by Sun Yu, starring Li Lili and Zhang Yi. The film revolves around a girl who arrives in Shanghai to devote her talents to athletics and is almost led astray by college boys. She is put back on track by her coach and she understands of the idea of "true sportsmanship (体育真精神)".

Sun Yu made a series of films featuring the image of "bonny girls", which not only entertained the audiences at the time, but advocated the spirit of "sports saving the nation" in the social and political context of 1930s' China. The film was made to coincide with the 1934 Far Eastern Championship Games (the precursor to the Asian Games) in Shanghai.

== Plot ==
The story begins with Lin Ying (Li Lili), a free-spirited girl who comes from a wealthy, rural family from Shanghai. She is initially set up with a suitor, but after displaying outstanding athletic prowess, she goes to attend a specialist school for female athletes, who all compete for the title "Queen of Sports".

Inspired by the noble conviction that China will become a stronger country if all the people were to strengthen their bodies, Lin Ying works hard to become an outstanding sprinter. However, she becomes spoiled by success and becomes arrogant and neglectful of her studies. She begins to associate herself with westernized college boys who spend their time drinking, smoking, and dancing. At a party, Hu Shaoyuan (He Feiguang) tries to grope Lin several times. Her coach, Yun Peng (Zhang Yi), rescues her. After this experience, she vows to change her ways and continues to work hard.

By the end of the film, after the death of a classmate, Xiao Qiuhua (Bai Lu), due to overexertion, Lin Ying decides that the pursuit of individual glory is wrong. Lin redefines the true spirit of sports and gives up the championship. She is no longer interested in being hailed as the "Queen of Sports", and resolves to serve others as a teacher of physical education.

== Cast ==
- Li Lili as Lin Ying
- Zhang Yi as Yun Peng
- Wang Moqiu as Ai Zheng
- Yin Xu as Yun Yan
- Bai Lu as Xiao Qiuhua
- Han Lan'gen as Xiaomao
- He Feiguang as Hu Shaoyuan
- Liu Jiqun as Lin Ying's Uncle

== Production ==
=== Origins ===
In the early 1930s, China was in danger from Japanese militarism as well as economic depression. Japan staged the Mukden Incident in September 1931 and established the puppet state of Manchukuo months later. This launched the years of Japanese military occupation and control over the northeastern area of China. During this time, Sun Yu was a producer, director, screenwriter, and actor for the Lianhua Film Production and Printing Company, a studio established by the producers Luo Mingyou (1901–1967) and Li Minwei (1893–1953). The studio was made under the auspices of the top-tiered politicians, ideologues, and financiers of the Kuomintang for the purpose of making educational films that would promulgate the Party's sociopolitical values, which are understood as being right-wing. The Kuomintang invested a lot of money into the making of educational films (both documentary and fiction) for political purposes, which gave birth to the film Sports Queen.

Sun Yu and Li Lili had previously collaborated in the films "Little Toys" (《小玩意》) and "Daybreak" (天明). Sun Yu admired Li Lili's athletic beauty, healthy physique, and energy. Sun Yu then wrote this script entirely designed to enhance her attractiveness and spirit. He began shooting the film on November 26, 1933.

=== Themes and inspirations ===
Due to the dangers of Japanese militarism and the economic depression that hit China in the early 1930s, many people involved in the film industry called for the revolution and revitalization of national films, including Sun Yu. Inspired by the country's call for revitalizing national films, he produced the film with the idea of a "fit woman's body" to match the popular propaganda of "fitness helps to save the nation". This is a recurring theme in the film, as Lin Ying mentions: "I know why China isn't strong. The number one reason is that our body isn't strong!"

Throughout the 1930s, Chinese filmmaking was strongly influenced by the perceived Hollywood's melodramatic cinematic style, which was characterized by scandal, sexual promiscuity, and drug addiction. Despite filmmakers' claims of attempts to warn the audience about alien spiritual pollution, foreign cultural modes were still often displayed in an alluring way and attracted more audiences than repelled. Sun Yu was one of the first leftist filmmakers who attempted to explore the idea of spiritual pollution with Sports Queen in 1934, which was also produced under the political influence of Xia Yan's small Communist film group in Shanghai.

The Kuomintang started the New Life Movement in February 1934, which the film agreed with to some extent. For example, the film took two minutes focusing on personal hygiene issues: Lin Ying and her teammates get up in the morning and do gymnastics on their canvas beds before brushing their teeth.

The film's narrative consists of a strong sense of community and societal expectations over a single individual. To further advance China's image to the rest of the world, make it more positive, and contribute to national development, Sun Yu believed that emphasizing the importance of maintaining a healthy lifestyle in the individual would build the nation as a whole.

=== Casting ===
One of the goals of Sports Queen was to display Li Lili's athletic ability. This film also embedded her presence as "an athletic movie star", especially as it highlighted her proficiency in running, a part of the male-dominated sport of track and field.

Fan magazines confirmed Li Lili's athletic skills outside of the film screen with photos of her in sports attire, posing with her school basketball team or alone on a running track. While there were other "actresses visiting sports games", Li Lili was respected and admired as an athlete.

== Reception ==
=== True sportsmanship ===
Li Daoxin, a professor at Peking University, presented a speech on China Central Television, which used Sports Queen to discuss the meaning of true sportsmanship (lit. the spirit of sports).

Sun Yu's reflection on the concept of utilizing sports to save the country is conveyed in Sports Queen. This reflection is first manifested in the film's inscription: "Dedicated to the Soldiers Who Work for the True Spirit of Sports". Under the inspiration of true sportsmanship, Lin Ying, the heroine of the film, gave up her victory and the title of Queen of Sports. Sun Yu interpreted true sportsmanship as the collective progress of the nation and the necessary personal sacrifice for the overall benefit of society.

When Yun Peng, Lin Ying's mentor and coach, teaches his female students, he states that "[t]rue sportsmanship is the need for balanced improvements of every single person's physique, the need to spread [this value] among society..." and that "it is definitely not to create individual heroes", expressing that prioritizing the widespread popularization of sports over individual competitive success is the definition of the so-called true sportsmanship.

In her last moments, Xiao Qiuhua said to Lin Ying, "Though I am an athlete, I do not possess true sportsmanship, because physical exercise should be for strengthening the body, for us to be more healthy and lead happier lives, but instead I placed too much importance in reputation and thus it has led to consequences today." According to scholar Zhao Zijian, Sun Yu intended to impart the message that the most important part of sports should not be victory or defeat, but the participation and the process of doing so.

The didactic message about the need to harness the individual body—in particular, the female body—for nation building focuses on the collective, which is a feature of subsequent Chinese sports films.

=== The Athletic New Woman ===
Li Lili's persona as a patriotic modern youth in Sports Queen is profoundly different from that of a fallen woman which Ruan Lingyu represented in her popular films such as The Goddess and New Women. In Sports Queen, Li Lili's distinctively female physicality shown in the camera's focus on her body greatly departs from the clichéd image of the fallen woman that Ruan Lingyu typically exhibits in her masterpieces, who usually uses cosmetics and even self-commodification to enhance her sexual appeal. This shift indicates an identification of "modern culture of fashion and consumption" as well as the conflict of traditional Chinese values and contemporary fashionable femininity.

Victor Fan, drawing from the work of Hansen and Laura Mulvey, claims that the film centers on the playfulness (a resistance against being viewed seriously) of Lin Ying and emphasizes her athletic curiosity, making the athletic female body a "scopophilic fetish". Fan argues that the sexual attraction between Yun and Lin was captured through the shot-reverse-shot sequences.

Upon arrival in Shanghai, the female protagonist is enrolled in a school focused on physical education. She runs around actively outdoors while also taking classes and practicing music indoors, exploring the values of sportsmanship. This image on screen stands in stark contrast to the traditional Chinese view of a woman who should have bound feet and work indoors at all times.

At the time, China maintained many conservative values, such as that women should work at home instead of being out and about. The film is unconventional in that it subverted these traditions and presented to viewers the concept of women of a new era. Hence, the understanding and definition of women experienced enormous change under the guidance of film culture.

Despite the portrayal of active women, out of approximately thirty title cards throughout the film, communication between Lin Ying and Yun Peng take up about 20, through which clear logic is conveyed: a woman requires a man for teaching and leadership—the sports queen has a gift for sports but is psychologically an immature little girl who needs protection and guidance.

== In popular culture ==
The title "sports queen" became sought after by its audiences, and advocated athletics as a significant part of womanhood.

Few scholars focused on the effect of sports and athletics on creating modern Chinese women. However, Sports Queen sparked discourse in female physical health with the film's presence in Chinese media and popular culture. Tiyu Huanghou: Modeng Mingge Xuan (Sports Queen: Selections of Modern Popular Songs) was a music booklet named after the film, which consists of music and lyrics of the most popular songs of the time. The first song in the booklet was also called Sports Queen, though not part of the film.

The cartoon magazine Modern Sketch used images inspired by the film in their publications, such as pictures of "Li crouching at the starting line and running among a group of strong and tough girls." These images of female athletes became popular with college and middle school students, depicting the film as popular within this age group and giving it a certain degree of social influence. Li Lili drew cartoons of herself and collaborated with cartoonists such as Shao Xunmei, Ye Lingfeng, and Ye Qianyu. In Modern Sketch's article Shidai Xiaojie de Jianglai (transl. The Future of the Ladies of the Era), Ye Qianyu drew a cartoon portrait of the actress titled "Sweet Girl Li Lili" to promote the actress's sweet disposition. Written by Xu Xingqin, the article was published on April 15, 1934. This image is also seen in Li Lili's 2001 memoir, which she published for friends and family.

The popular photography pictorial Liangyou Huabao used similar sporty images of Li Lili from Sports Queen to support the film's message of tiyu (physical education). The caption read: "The Goal of Tiyu : competition supports tiyu, but the ultimate goal of tiyu is definitely not competition. In athletic competition, the winners do not have to be overjoyed, and the losers do not have to cry, because they are both actors who perform in front of the masses to show them that physical health is the true meaning of tiyu. We do not need a so-called 'queen of sports.' What we need are healthy citizens, even though they may finish last in athletic competitions. Every athlete should firmly remember: the ultimate goal of tiyu is to cultivate healthy bodies in order to contribute to the greatest work for the happiness of mankind, not a gold spear or a silk banner."

== English translations ==
An English-subtitled copy of the film is available on YouTube and on the Chinese Film Classics website.
