= Mei Lin (actress) =

Chinese actress (1915–1997)

- 梅琳
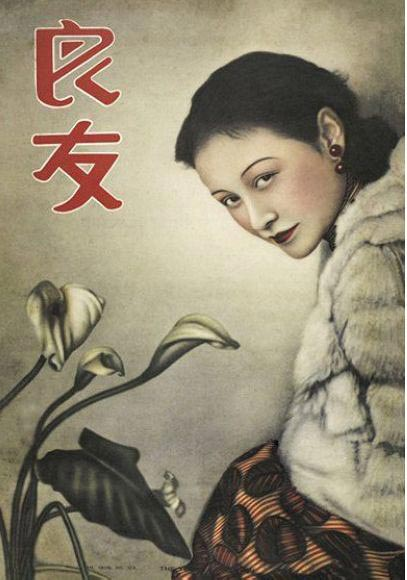
- Mei Lin on the cover of The Young Companion pictorial, also known as Liangyou, in 1936.

Mei Lin (1915-1997), also romanised as Mei Ling, was a Chinese actress who worked in the Chinese movie industry in the 1930s. She worked for the Lianhua Film Company, where she began her film career. She also worked for the Xinhua Film Company. She appeared on the cover of the January 1936 issue of The Young Companion pictorial, also known as Liangyou, issue number 113.

== Movies ==
=== Linhua film company ===
- The Innocent Gentleman (无愁君子), leading actress
- Song of China (天伦), supporting actress
- Lianhua Symphony (联华交响曲), supporting actress

=== Xinhua film company ===
- Flying Blessing (飞来福), leading actress
- Children's Heroes (儿女英雄传), leading actress
