= Lai Hang =

Chinese actor

- Born: 1928; Shanghai, Republic of China
- Died: February 9, 1965 (aged 36–37); Guangzhou, Guangdong, People's Republic of China
- Cause of death: suicide by hanging
- Other name: Henry Lai
- Education: Lingnan University
- Parents: Lai Man-wai (father); Lim Cho Cho (mother)

Lai Hang (Chinese: 黎铿; pinyin: Lí Kēng; 1928 – 9 February 1965) was a Chinese actor who began his acting career at age 4.

== Early life ==
Lai was born in Shanghai, Republic of China. Lai's parents were Japanese-born filmmaker Lai Man-wai and Canadian-born actress Lim Cho Cho.

== Career ==
Lai appeared in many films with his mother in the 1930s. One of Lai's most notable roles was in The Goddess (1934), which was voted one of the top 30 Chinese films of all time at the 2005 Hong Kong Film Awards.

== Personal life ==
Lai Hang was also known as Henry Lai, Henry Lai Hang, and Li Keng.

Though his parents both resided in Hong Kong after the Chinese Communist Revolution, Lai chose to remain in mainland China to dedicate himself to the Communist cause. He was attacked in 1963 during the Socialist Education Movement because his older sister Lai Lan lived in Taiwan with her husband Shen Chang-huan, who was a high-ranking Republic of China diplomat.

Lai's marriage also fell apart, and in 1965 Lai Hang committed suicide by hanging himself from a tree.

== Filmography ==
=== Film ===
Year	English title	Original title	Role	Notes
1932	Conscienceless	人道		Lost
1933	Night in the City	城市之夜		Lost
1934	Life	人生		Lost
1934	Coming Home	歸來		Surviving copy is unedited
1934	A Sea of Fragrant Snow	香雪海		Lost
1934	The Goddess	神女	Shuiping	
1935	Song of China	天倫		
1935	Young China	幼年中國		
1936	Gateways of Body and Spirit	靈肉之門		
1937	Song of a Kind Mother	慈母曲		
1937	A New-Comer's Way	新人道		
1938	Rouge Tears	胭脂淚		
1940	The Little Hero	小英雄		
1941	Good Son, Good Daughter	好兒女		
1941	A Prostitute and a General	賽金花		
1941	Rescue Grandpa	孤兒救祖記		
1949	The Way of Love	戀愛之道		
1950	Democratic Youth on the March	民主青年進行曲		
1952	The Harmful Yiguandao	一貫害人道	Zhang Jianhua	
1958	Shanghai Girls	上海姑娘	Xiao Zhao	
1963	The House of 72 Tenants	七十二家房客		Assistant director.
1963	The Emperor Looks for a General	齊王求將		Assistant director
