= The Light of Maternal Instinct =

- DVD cover
- Chinese: 母性之光
- Hanyu Pinyin: Mǔ Xìng Zhī Guāng
- Directed by: Bu Wancang
- Written by: Bu Wancang
- Produced by: Lai Man-wai
- Starring: Lai Cheuk-Cheuk; Chen Yanyan; Jin Yan
- Cinematography: Wong Siao Fen
- Music by: Ren Guang
- Production company: United Photoplay Service
- Release date: 1933
- Running time: 92 minutes
- Country: Republic of China
- Languages: Silent film, with Chinese intertitles

The Light of Maternal Instinct (also translated as The Glory of Motherhood) is a 1933 Chinese drama film directed by Bu Wancang, starring Lai Cheuk-Cheuk, Chen Yanyan, and Jin Yan. It is a silent film, but there is background music composed by Ren Guang. One of the songs was composed by Nie Er.

Bu Wancang is also the credited writer, but some scholars believe it was actually Tian Han who wrote the script. Tian Han had secretly joined the Chinese Communist Party in 1932 and was a wanted man by the Nationalist government for his leftist writings.

The film was remade in 1939 by Yueh Feng as Mother and Daughter (雲裳仙子).

== Setting ==
The film is set in both Shanghai and Southeast Asia (Nanyang).

== Cast ==
- Lai Cheuk-Cheuk as Huiying
- Jin Yan as Jiahu, Huiying's first husband
- Chen Yanyan as Shao Mei, Jiahu and Huiying's daughter
- Lu Shi as Lin Jimei, Huiying's second husband
- Li Junpan as Huang Xiaoshan, a capitalist in Southeast Asia
- He Feiguang as Huang Shulin, Huang Xiaoshan's son
- Tan Ying as Chen Bili, a dancer from Shanghai
- Liu Jiqun as Liu Dakui, clown #1
- Han Langen as Han Junhou, clown #2
- Yin Xiucen as Yin Weizai, clown #3
- Nie Er as dark-skinned man in Southeast Asia
