= The Peach Girl =

1931 silent film by Bu Wancang

- DVD cover
- Traditional Chinese: 桃花泣血記
- Simplified Chinese: 桃花泣血记
- Literal meaning: Peach Blossom Weeps Tears of Blood
- Hanyu Pinyin: Táohuā Qì Xuě Jì
- Directed by: Bu Wancang
- Written by: Bu Wancang
- Produced by: Lai Man-Wai; Lo Ming-yau
- Starring: Ruan Lingyu; Jin Yan; S.Y. Li; Wong Kwai-ling
- Cinematography: Huang Shaofen
- Production company: Lianhua Film Company
- Release date: December 1931 (China)
- Running time: 89 minutes
- Country: Republic of China
- Languages: Silent film, with Traditional Chinese and English intertitles

The Peach Girl, also known as Peach Blossom Weeps Tears of Blood, is a 1931 silent film written and directed by Bu Wancang. The cast included some of the major movie stars of the periods including the Korean-born actor Jin Yan and the actresses Ruan Lingyu and Zhou Lili.

The film was produced by the Lianhua Film Company and proved an early success for the studio, in no small part due to the on screen combination of Jin and Ruan, the so-called "Valentino" and "Garbo" of Shanghai cinema, and who starred together in several vehicles before Ruan's suicide in 1935.

This film marks the first of several collaborations between Ruan Lingyu and Jin Yan as an on-screen couple.

A print of the film is currently maintained by the China Film Archives.

== Plot ==
Miss Lim, the daughter of a poor herder, grows up with King Teh-en, the son of a wealthy landowning family. Although the two are close from childhood, their relationship is opposed by Teh-en’s mother because of the differences in their social status.

As they grow older, Miss Lim and Teh-en fall in love. Teh-en’s mother tries to separate them and sends Miss Lim away, but Teh-en continues to see her. He later takes Miss Lim to the city, hoping to keep their relationship away from his family’s control. Their romance is eventually discovered, and Miss Lim’s father brings the couple back to confront Teh-en’s mother.

Teh-en’s mother refuses to accept Miss Lim as a suitable match for her son and instead arranges for him to marry a woman from a family of similar status. Miss Lim, abandoned and pregnant, returns home in shame. After giving birth, she becomes seriously ill. Her father, who has lost his job, struggles to care for both Miss Lim and the child.

An elderly man in the village proposes to Miss Lim, but she refuses him. Teh-en later learns of her condition and rushes to see her. By the time he arrives, Miss Lim is near death. After her death, Teh-en’s mother accepts Miss Lim’s child into the family, allowing Miss Lim’s grave to remain on the family’s land.

== Cast ==
- Ruan Lingyu (credited as Lily Yuen) as Miss Lim
- Jin Yan (credited as Raymond King) as King Teh-en
- S.Y. Li as Teh-en's mother
- Wong Kwai-ling as Loo Chi (Lim's father)
- Chow Lee-lee as Lim's Mother
- Y.C. Lay as Chow Chuen Chuen
- Han Lan-ken as Slim
- Liu Chi Chuen as Fatty
- Y.C. Wong as Chow's Mother
- S.M. Shen as A Brave Man

== Production ==
The film contains Chinese and English intertitles with some Chinese text differing from their English translation.

Inspired by the wuxia (martial arts) craze, several action brawl scenes were added.

== Music ==
When the film premiered in Taiwan in 1932, distributors commissioned a promotional song titled "Taohua Qixue Ji". Its lyrics were written by silent film narrator Zhan Tianma based on the film's story synopsis, and composed by Wang Yunfend. To publicize the film, distributors organized groups of young women dressed as characters from the film to perform the song in the streets of Taipei. The campaign proved highly successful, and both the song and the film became popular throughout Taiwan. The song has been described as Taiwan’s first modern commercially marketed popular song and was later recorded by Columbia Records. Its success helped establish singer Chun Chun (純純) as one of the earliest stars of Taiwanese popular music.

== Themes ==
The Peach Girl is a tragic romance centered on a romance blocked by class difference. The relationship between Miss Lim, the daughter of a poor herder, and King Teh-en, the son of a wealthy landowning family, presents social class structure as the main obstacle to marriage and family recognition. The film also links Miss Lim’s suffering to the social stigma attached to unmarried pregnancy and to the unequal power of rich families over poorer rural households.

The film has also been discussed in relation to the star image of Ruan Lingyu, whose performances in early 1930s Chinese cinema often emphasized powerless women facing social pressure and moral judgement.

== Historical context ==
While The Peach Girl was produced during the beginning of the left-wing cinema movement, some scholars do not consider the film to be a part of said movement as it lacks politically reactionary themes. However, the overarching theme of class conflict separates this film from mainstream commercial genre films.

The film approaches social realism as Teh-en is characterized as the weak Chinese bourgeois who is unwilling to stand up for his relationship. In contrast, Miss Lim is a morally strong albeit naïve character. According to an interview with Bu Wancang, he wanted to appeal to two demographics; the intellectuals and the women. Both demographics viewed the ‘strong but victimized’ woman to be the symbol of the ‘New Chinese Woman’.

Between the 1920s and 1930s, traditional family values of arranged marriages were often challenged and films exposed the flaws of the old marriage system. Miss Lim and Teh-en’s relationship was met with disapproval by Teh-en’s mother due to differing class status, which resulted in Teh-en abandoning Miss Lim for the sake of his mother. The tragic story highlights parental power and the traditional way of selecting a partner through ‘men dang hudui' or matching socioeconomic status.

This film, referred to as a ‘butterfly prototype’ by Paul G. Pickowicz, begins to leave the traditional ways of life behind and embraces the new culture. As Miss Lim and Teh-en move to the city, we see Miss Lim transform into a fashionable city girl through camera lenses, contrasting with her earlier form. This shift from countryside to city was considered spiritual pollution and un-Chinese.

== Releases ==
The first VCD and DVD re-releases of the film in mainland China, Hong Kong, and Taiwan all used the same battered, cropped, dark prints.

The new DVD versions of Peach Girl use 35mm prints provided by China Film Archive, in which the image is not cropped. Those versions used are the most complete available.
