= National Customs =

- DVD cover
- Directed by: Lo Ming-yau; Zhu Shilin
- Written by: Lo Ming-yau
- Produced by: Lo Ming-yau
- Starring: Ruan Lingyu; Li Lili; Lim Cho Cho; Zheng Junli; Luo Peng
- Cinematography: Hong Weilie
- Production company: Lianhua Film Company
- Release date: May 13, 1935 (China)
- Running time: 94 minutes
- Country: Republic of China
- Language: Silent film with Chinese intertitles

National Customs (simplified Chinese: 国风; traditional Chinese: 國風; pinyin: Guó fēng) is a 1935 Chinese film directed by Lo Ming-yau and Zhu Shilin. The film was silent film star Ruan Lingyu's last performance before she died in 1935.

This film is a propaganda film promoting the New Life Movement, which was launched in 1934.

== Cast ==
- Lim Cho Cho as Zhang Jie, a rural school principal
- Ruan Lingyu as Zhang Lan, Zhang Jie's elder daughter
- Li Lili as Zhang Tao, Zhang Jie's younger daughter
- Zheng Junli as Chen Zuo, a cousin of the Zhang sisters
- Luo Peng as Xu Boyang, a classmate
