= Lo Ming-yau =

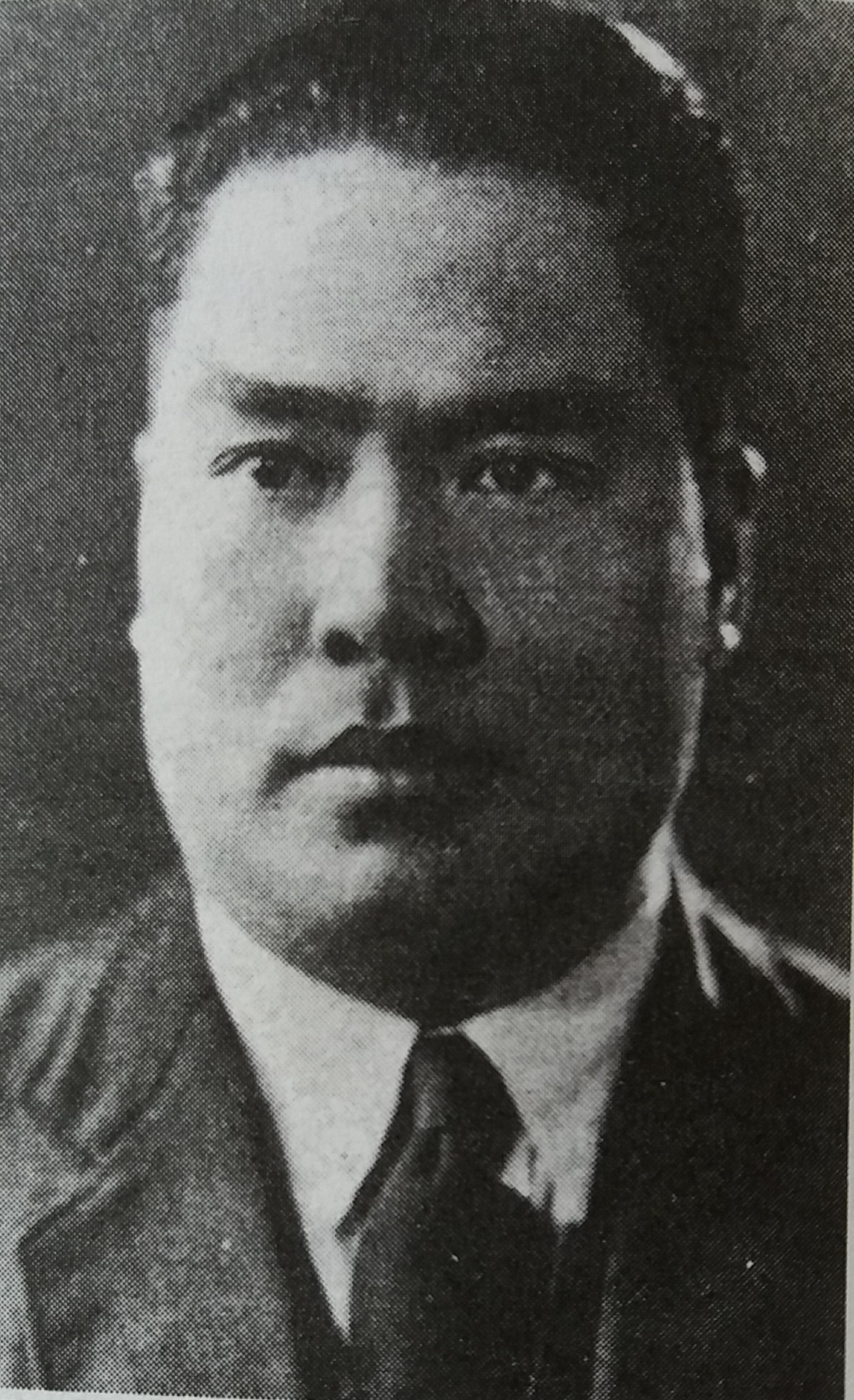
- Born: 1900; British Hong Kong
- Died: 1967 (aged 66–67); British Hong Kong
- Education: Peking University

Lo Ming-yau (1900–1967) or Luo Mingyou was a Hong Kong entrepreneur and filmmaker, and a pioneer of Chinese cinema. His uncle Lo Wen-kan (羅文榦, Luo Wengan) was a major politician during the early Republican period.

Lo Ming-yau founded the Hwa Peh Film Company (華北電影公司) in Beijing in 1927. In 1930, Hwa Peh Film Company merged with Lai Man-Wai's China Sun Motion Picture Company and a few other companies in Shanghai to become United Photoplay Service, one of the biggest film studios in China.

In 1936 Lo Ming-yau was forced to withdraw from United Photoplay Service and later made his living as a Christian priest.

== Selected filmography ==
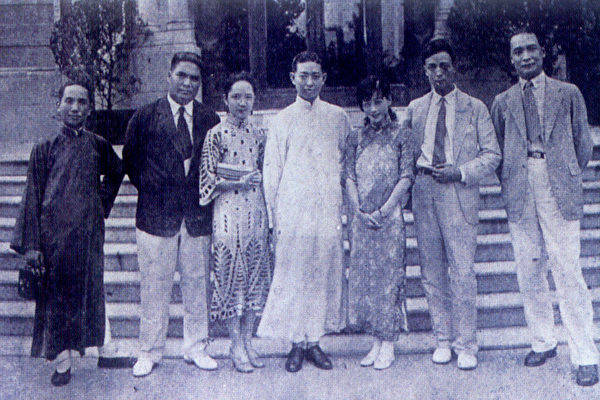
Key people of United Photoplay Service studio (L-R): Lai Man-Wai, Lo Ming Yau, Lim Cho-cho, Mei Lanfang, Ruan Lingyu, Sun Yu, and Jeffrey Y.C. Huang (黃漪磋).

- A Spray of Plum Blossoms (1931), producer
- The Peach Girl (1931), producer
- Love and Duty (1931), producer
- Two Stars in the Milky Way (1931), producer
- Little Toys (1933), producer
- Daybreak (1933), producer
- The Goddess (1934), producer
- Sports Queen (1934), producer
- National Customs (1935), co-director and scriptwriter

== In popular culture ==
Paul Chang Chung portrays Lo Ming-yau in the 1991 film Center Stage.
