= Festival moon =

Festival moon may be:

- Festival Moon (film), 1953 film by Zhu Shilin
- Festival Moon, an anthology of short fiction in the Merovingen Nights science fiction series
