= Three Modern Women =

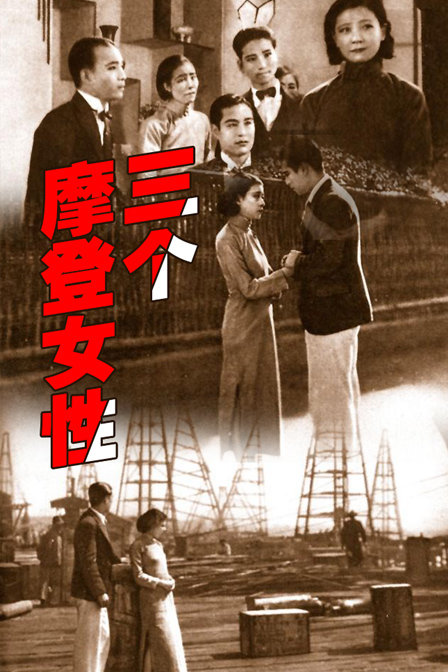
- Film poster
- Directed by: Bu Wancang
- Written by: Tian Han
- Starring: Ruan Lingyu; Chen Yen-yen; Lai Cheuk-Cheuk; Jin Yan
- Production company: Lianhua Film Company
- Release date: 1933
- Running time: 110 minutes
- Country: China

Three Modern Women (Chinese: 三个摩登女性; pinyin: Sāngè Módēng Nǚxìng) is a 1933 Chinese film directed by Bu Wancang and written by Tian Han. The film tells a story about the romantic relationships between a movie star and three women representing three archetypes of contemporary women. Released by the Lianhua Film Company, it was highly popular and won praise from left-wing critics.

It is considered a lost film.

== Cast ==
- Ruan Lingyu
- Chen Yen-yen
- Lai Cheuk-Cheuk
- Jin Yan

== See also ==
- New Women – 1935 film directed by Cai Chusheng
- Women Side by Side – 1949 film directed by Chen Liting
- List of Chinese films of the 1930s
