= Center Stage (1991 film) =

1991 Hong Kong film by Stanley Kwan

- DVD cover

Chinese name
- Traditional Chinese: 阮玲玉
- Simplified Chinese: 阮玲玉
Transcriptions
Standard Mandarin
- Hanyu Pinyin: Ruǎn Língyù
Yue: Cantonese
- Jyutping: jyun5 ling4 juk6
- Directed by: Stanley Kwan
- Screenplay by: Yau Kong-Kin
- Story by: Peggy Chiao
- Produced by: Willie Chan; Tsui Siu-Ming; Zhang Yongning; Leonard Ho
- Starring: Maggie Cheung; Chin Han; Tony Leung Ka-Fai; Lawrence Ng
- Cinematography: Poon Hang-Sang
- Edited by: Peter Cheung; Keung Chuen-Tak
- Music by: Thio Hugo-Panduputra; Johnny Chen
- Production company: Golden Way Films Ltd.
- Distributed by: Golden Harvest; Media Asia Group
- Release dates: 29 November 1991 (Taiwan); 20 February 1992 (Hong Kong)
- Running time: 146 minutes 154 minutes (Extended version); 126 minutes (Edited version)
- Country: Hong Kong
- Languages: Cantonese; Mandarin; Shanghainese; English
- Box office: $18,110

Center Stage (Chinese: 阮玲玉; pinyin: Ruǎn Língyù; Jyutping: jyun5 ling4 juk6; Cantonese Yale: yun5 ling4 yuk6), also known as Actress and Yuen Ling-yuk, is a 1991 Hong Kong biographical docudrama film directed by Stanley Kwan. It follows the life and career of silent film actress Ruan Lingyu (1910–1935), portrayed by Maggie Cheung.

Cheung won Best Actress at the Berlin International Film Festival in 1992 for her performance.

== Plot summary ==
The film is based on a true story: the tragic life of China's first prima donna of the silver screen, Ruan Lingyu. This movie chronicles her rise to fame as a movie actress in Shanghai during the 1930s. Nicknamed the "Chinese Garbo," Ruan Lingyu began her acting career when she was 16 and died by suicide at 24.

The film alternates between present scenes (production talks between director Kwan, Cheung, and co-star Carina Lau, interviews of witnesses who knew Ruan), re-creation scenes with Cheung (as Ruan, acting inside this movie), and extracts from Ruan's original films including her final two films The Goddess (1934) and New Women (1935).

== Cast ==
- Maggie Cheung as Ruan Lingyu
- Chin Han as Tang Jishan
- Tony Leung Ka-fai as Cai Chusheng
- Lawrence Ng as Zhang Damin
- Carina Lau as Li Lili
- Cecilia Yip as Lim Cho Cho
- Waise Lee as Lai Man-Wai
- Paul Chang Chung as Luo Mingyou
- Hsiao Hsiang as He Aying (Ruan's mother)
- Maryanna Yip as Lai Cheuk-Cheuk
- Yumiko Cheng as Child actress
- Fu Chong as Nie Er
- Xue Guoping as Jin Yan
- Sun Dongguang as Sun Yu
- Xiao Rongsheng as Wu Yonggang
- Zheng Dali as Zheng Junli
- Zhou Jie as Liu Qiong
- Huang Daliang as Wu Chengyu
- Claude Monges as Mr. Skinner
- Carrie Lanese as Mrs. Skinner

Two actors are the sons of their characters: Sun Dongguang is the son of director Sun Yu, and Zheng Dali is the son of actor Zheng Junli.

== Music ==
The theme song "Zangxin" (葬心; "Burying the Heart") was composed by Taiwanese singer-songwriter Johnny Chen and recorded by Taiwanese singer Tracy Huang. It won Best Original Film Song at the 12th Hong Kong Film Awards.

The film also contains a scene in which Lianhua Film Company actors sang the "Dalu Ge" (大路歌; "The Big Road Song") composed by Nie Er, which would become the theme song for Sun Yu's 1934 anti-Japanese film The Big Road.

== Reception ==
=== Awards ===
- 28th Golden Horse Awards, 1991
  - Best Leading Actress – Maggie Cheung
  - Best Cinematography – Poon Hang Sang
  - Best Feature Film (nominated)
  - Best Director – Stanley Kwan (nominated)
- 42nd Berlin International Film Festival, 1992
  - Silver Bear for Best Actress – Maggie Cheung
- Chicago International Film Festival, 1992
  - Silver Hugo Award for Best Actress – Maggie Cheung
- 12th Hong Kong Film Awards, 1993
  - Best Actress – Maggie Cheung
  - Best Cinematography – Poon Hang Sang
  - Best Art Direction – Pok Yuk Mok
  - Best Original Film Score – Johnny Chen
  - Best Original Film Song – Johnny Chen

=== Recognition ===
Prominent American film critic Jonathan Rosenbaum picked the film as one of his favorites of the 1990s.
