= List of Chinese film-production companies before 1949 =

The following is a list of notable film production companies from mainland China before the communist revolution in 1949.

== C ==
- Changcheng Film Company – (Great Wall) Active in the 1920s

== D ==
- Dadi Film Company – (Great Earth), Hong Kong production company active between 1939 and 1940 that focused on Mandarin-language films, founded by Cai Chusheng and Situ Huimin
- Datong Film Company – (Great Harmony), Major privately owned production company of the 1940s
- Dazhonghua – (Great China), first major production company to emerge in post-war Hong Kong, focused on Mandarin-language films
- Dazhonghua Baihe Film Company – Major production company of the 1920s, later merged into Lianhua
- Diantong Film Company – Leftist film company active from 1934 to 1935. Only produced four films.

== G ==
- Guohua Productions – Founded in the late 1930s by former Mingxing director Zhang Shichuan, major rival of Xinhua Film Company during the "Solitary Island" period

== H ==
- Huamei Film Company – (China-America Film), early production company founded by American Benjamin Brodsky in Hong Kong. Only produced one film, Lai Man-Wai's landmark 1913 film Zhuangzi Tests His Wife.

== K ==
- Kunlun Film Company – (Mount Kunlun Pictures), Major privately owned production company in the 1940s, produced the 1949 anti-GMD film Crows and Sparrows

== L ==
- Lianhua Film Company

== M ==
- Manchukuo Film Association – One of the most controversial companies under Japanese authority
- China Sun Motion Picture Company, Lai Man-wai's production company, later merged into Lianhua.
- Mingxing Film Company – (Star)

== N ==
- Northeast Film Studio – One of the cornerstone companies.

== S ==
- Shanghai Animation Film Studio
- Shanghai Yingxi ("Shanghai Films") – Active in the 1920s, later merged into Lianhua
- South China Motion Picture Co. – Active in mid-1930s.

== T ==
- Tianyi Film Company (Unique Film Productions), predecessor of the Shaw Brothers Studio, active in the 1920s and 1930s

== W ==
- Wenhua Film Company – (Cultural China), major privately-owned (by Wu Xingcai) production company of the 1940s; produced Fei Mu's Spring in a Small Town (1947)

== X ==
- Xianggang Yingye – active in the 1920s, later merged into Lianhua
- Xibei Film Company
- Xin Shidai Film Company – Produced Situ Humin's 1938 The Blood Spilt in the Treasure Mountain City.
- Xinhua Film Company – (New China), leftist film company, active in the 1930s and 1940s

== Y ==
- Yihua Film Company – Active in the 1930s, produced Leftist films
- Yiji Film Company

== Z ==
- Zhongyang Films – (Central) Minor production company, active in the 1930s
