= Lai Cheuk-cheuk =

Hong Kong actress

- 黎灼灼
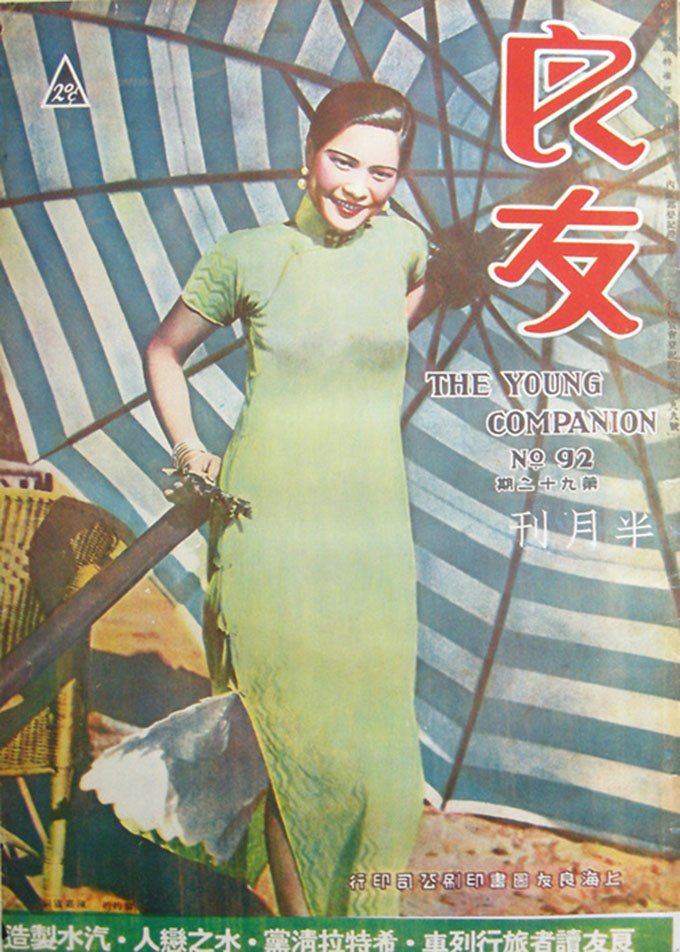
- Lai on the cover of The Young Companion, August 1934
- Born: Lai Hang-kau; 22 May 1905; British Hong Kong
- Died: 15 May 1990 (aged 84); British Hong Kong
- Other names: Lai Chok-chok, Li Zhuozhuo, Li Zhuo-zhuo, Li Cho-cho, Li Chi-chi
- Spouse: Chen Zhendong (陳振東)
- Father: Lai Man-Wai

Chinese name
- Chinese: 黎灼灼
Transcriptions
Standard Mandarin
- Hanyu Pinyin: Lí Zhuózhuó
Yue: Cantonese
- Jyutping: Lai^{4} Coek^{3}-Coek^{3}

Birth name
- Chinese: 黎杏球
Transcriptions
Standard Mandarin
- Hanyu Pinyin: Lí Xìngqiú
Yue: Cantonese
- Jyutping: Lai^{4} Hang^{6}-Kau^{4}

Lai Cheuk-cheuk (22 May 1905 – 15 May 1990), was a Chinese actress from Hong Kong. Lai is credited with over 180 films.

== Early life ==
On May 22, 1905, Lai was born in Hong Kong to Lai Man-Wai, who was a key figure of the first generation of Hong Kong filmmakers.

== Career ==
Lai started her acting career in Shanghai, China in 1932 when she joined the famed Lianhua Film Company, which was co-owned by her uncle Lai Man-Wai. In 1934, Lai started as an actress in Hong Kong films. Lai appeared in Breaking Waves, a 1934 Romance film directed by Kwan Man-ching. Lai's last film was Joy to the World (a.k.a. Jacky Wong, King of Comedy), a 1980 Romantic Comedy film directed by Gam Yam. Lai is credited with over 180 films.

== Filmography ==
=== Films ===
Year	English title	Original title	Role	Notes
1932	Conscienceless	人道	Liu Xiyi	Lost
1933	Three Modern Women	三個摩登女性	Yu Yu	Lost
1933	The Light of Maternal Instinct	母性之光	Huiying	
1934	Breaking Waves	破浪	Wong Yeh-Lan	Lost
1934	Brother	難兄		Lost
1934	Spoondrift Village	浪花村		Lost
1935	Song of China	天倫		
1936	A Lamb Astray	迷途的羔羊	Madam Shen	
1937	Lianhua Symphony	聯華交響曲		Segment 2: "Nightmare in Spring Chamber" (春閨斷夢)
1937	The General's Daughter	將軍之女		
1937	Song of a Kind Mother	慈母曲		
1937	The Lost Pearl	人海遺珠	Zhu Bing	
1937	New and Old Times	新舊時代		
1937	Vistas of Art	藝海風光		Part 1: "Film City" (電影城)
1937	The Honor of Patriots	大義滅親		
1938	Femme Fetale	奇女子		
1939	The Beautiful General	脂粉將軍		
1939	Two Daughters	女大思嫁	Eldest daughter	
1939	Heroine of the Times	蓋世女英雄		
1939	The Adventures of the Chinese Tarzan	中國泰山歷險記		
1940	Escape from the Law	孝子逃刑記		
1940	The Long Life Princess	長生宮主		
1940	The Tolling Bell	大地晨鐘		
1940	Two Knights	關東雙俠		
1940	My Motherland	白雲故鄉	Lucy Jin	
1940	Flower in a Sea of Blood	血海花		
1940	The Prince Who Loves a Slave	冷面皇夫		
1941	The Metropolis	大都會		
1941	Spring Engulfs the Mansion	春色滿園		
1941	A Prostitute and a General	賽金花	Empress Dowager Cixi	
1941	Three Amorous Women	春閨三鳳		
1941	Ancient Kingdom of Human Freaks	古國人妖		
1941	A Living Hero	生武松		
1946	Two Persons in Trouble; Unsympathetic to Each Other	同病不相憐		
1946	Flames of Lust	情燄		
1947	The Black Wolf Bandit	黑狼大盜		
1947	Red Chamber in the Sea	海角紅樓	Lady Sheung Kun	Two-part film
1947	The Beauty's Death	艷屍記		
1947	The Herbal Beauty	香草美人	Ma On-Kei	
1947	Take the Poison with Smile	含笑飲砒霜	Mang Ha	
1948	The Powdered World	金粉世家		Two-part film
1948	Four Generations in One House	四代同堂	Grandmother	
1948	Hong Kong King of Murderers	香港殺人王	Ma Tak Lit	
1948	The Remorseful Rich	朱門怨	Xu Wenfang	
1949	Love with No Result	雲雨巫山枉斷腸	Kok Nui	
1950	Wet Paint!	油漆未乾		
1950	A Dream of Silken Finery	綺羅春夢		
1950	Spring Comes and Winter Goes	冬去春來		
1950	Bandits of the Water Margin	逼上梁山	Wong Lung's mother	
1950	Kaleidoscope	人海萬花筒		Segment 3: "Debts of Love" (孽債)
1950	The End of the Year Means Money	年晚錢	Tai Tai	
1951	Tragedy in Canton	羊城恨史		
1953	Map of 100 Treasures	百寶圖		
1953	In the Face of Demolition	危樓春曉	Mrs. Wong	
1953	Spring	春	Grandmother	
1954	Father and Son	父與子	Head teacher	
1954	Autumn	秋	Grandmother	Sequel of Spring
1954	This Wonderful Life	錦繡人生		
1954	The Dream Encounter Between; Emperor Wu of Han and Lady Wai	漢武帝夢會衛夫人	Empress Dowager Wang	
1954	Loving Father, Faithful Son	父慈子孝	Tang Hong	
1955	Love	愛	Mrs. Wong	Two-part film
1955	Humanity	人道		
1955	Tragedy on the Hill of the Waiting Wife	魂斷望夫山	Sek's mother	
1955	Broken Spring Dreams	春殘夢斷		
1955	Backyard Adventures	後窗	Patron's wife	
1956	Beauty in the Mist	霧美人		
1956	My Eligible Son-in-Law	東床佳婿		
1956	Dial 999 for Murder	999命案	Mrs. Tse	
1956	Precious Daughter	嬌嬌女		
1956	Black Cat, the Cat Burglar	飛賊黑貓		
1956	Brothers	手足情深	Tong's mother	
1957	The Girl Next Door	鄰家有女初長成		
1957	Little Women	小婦人	Girl's grandmother	
1957	The Splendour of Youth	黛綠年華		
1958	Pin-Up Girl	廣告女郎		
1958	The Love Thief	橫刀奪愛	Lam Wai	
1958	Driver No. 7	第七號司機	Kuen's mother	
1958	Women's Trap	女人的陷阱		
1958	The Red House by the Sea	海角紅樓		
1958	Autumn Comes to Purple Rose Garden	紫薇園的秋天	Matriarch Kok	
1958	Flesh and Bone	骨肉親情		Two-part film
1959	The Broken Hearts	浪子嬌妻		
1959	Feast of a Rich Family	豪門夜宴		
1959	Typhoon Signal No. 10	十號風波		
1959	Dear Love	好冤家	Mrs. Fong	
1959	Daughter of a Grand Household	金枝玉葉	Hung's aunt	
1960	Three Drops of Blood	三滴血	Tai's mother	
1960	The Outcast Woman	棄婦	Mrs. Wu	Two-part film
1960	The Cruel Hand	毒手		
1960	Autumn Leaves	秋風殘葉	Mentor's wife	
1961	Conflict in Phoenix Hill	鳳凰山龍虎鬥		
1961	Long Live the Money	銀紙萬歲	Second Concubine	
1962	Sunset on the River	滿江紅	Man Tai	
1962	Sombre Night	夜深沉	Lau's wife	
1962	Revenge of the Twin Phoenixes	雙鳳仇		
1962	Blood-Stained Shoe	血繡鞋	Pong's mother	
1963	Love Forever	金石盟		
1963	The Big Revenge	灕江河畔血海仇		Two-part film
1963	The Millionaire's Daughter	千金之女	Etiquette teacher	
1963	My Only Love	情之所鍾		
1963	Flesh and Blood	骨肉恩情		
1963	Midnight Were-wolf	夜半人狼	Choi Tai	
1963	The Face of Fear	彩鳳驚魂		
1963	A Tale of Gratitude and Revenge	兒女恩仇		
1963	Somebody's Orphan	孤鳳雙雛		
1963	One Queen and Three Kings	一后三王		
1963	The Unbearable Sorrow	豪門怨	Madam Hui	
1964	A Loving Couple	俏冤家	Mother Chow	
1964	Beautiful Heaven	錦繡天堂		
1964	The Bride from the Grave	鬼新娘		
1964	Cheating Is All We Do	一味靠滾	Mrs. Chow	
1964	The Factory Rose	工廠玫瑰		
1964	Too High to Touch	高處不勝寒		
1964	The Dragon and the Bat	紅金龍大戰蝙蝠精		
1964	Hidden Love	一夜恩情	Stepmother	
1964	Love and Passion	情與愛	Wah's mother	
1964	Under Hong Kong's Roof	香港屋簷下	Mrs. Chu	
1964	I Did My Best	情至義盡	Fourth Aunt	
1964	An Independent Daughter	女大女世界	Wong's mother	
1964	A Lonely Heart	蘭閨怨婦		
1964	Young and Idle	摩登二世祖		
1965	A Wife's Diary	太太日記	Wu's wife	
1965	Endless Love	巫山夢斷相思淚		
1965	Playful Young Folks	紅男綠女		
1965	Your Infinitive Kindness	恩義難忘	Cheung's wife	
1965	The Drifting Girl	飄零雁	Cheung's mother	
1965	Tears of a Plum Blossom	冷梅情淚		
1965	Between Man and Ghost	人鬼恩仇		
1966	The Story Between Hong Kong and Macau	一水隔天涯	Principal Chun	
1966	You Do Me Wrong	玉女含冤		
1966	How Much Worry You Can Have	問君能有幾多愁		
1967	She Is Our Senior	大師姐	Mrs. Ng	
1967	First Love	情竇初開	Mrs. Lee	
1968	Bride in Chains	鎖著的新娘	Madame Fu	
1968	A House Filled with Happiness	歡樂滿華堂	Ling Ling's grandmother	
1968	A Blundering Detective and a Foolish Thief	烏龍偵探糊塗城	Mrs. Hui	
1968	A Great Lover	大情人		
1968	The White Dragon	飛俠小白龍	Mo's mother	
1969	Joy of Music	合歡歌舞慶華年		
1969	Mad Dragon	狂龍	Grandma Kong	
1969	Highway Riders of Shandong	銀刀血劍		
1969	Let's Build a Family	成家立室		
1970	Heads for Sale	女俠賣人頭	Madame Hua	
1970	The Rivals	翠寒谷		
1970	Young Lovers	青春戀	Ying Wei's grandmother	
1971	The Fascinating Group	迷你老爺車	Mrs. Chan	
1971	The Crimson Charm	血符門		
1971	When Will It Rotate?	重逢		
1971	Bus Stop	巴士站		
1973	Love Is a Four Letter Word	愛慾奇譚		
1973	Smoke in His Eye	心有點點愁		
1973	Death on the Docks	亡命浪子	Hsu Chien Ying's mother	
1974	The Little Man, Ah Fook	阿福正傳		
1974	Martial Arts	絕招		
1974	Supremo	至尊寶	Aunt	
1974	Crazy Bumpkins	阿牛入城記	Ah Niu's mother	
1974	Bravest Fist	一山五虎		
1974	Chinese Kung Fu Against Godfather	大鄉里大鬧歐洲	Tong's mother	
1974	The Devil in Her	女魔	Senior maid	
1975	All in the Family	花飛滿城春		
1975	Laugh in the Sleeve	三笑姻緣		
1975	The Winner Takes All	蠱惑女光棍才		
1976	The Reincarnation	投胎人		
1976	Love Cross-Road	她的爸的媽媽的		
1977	The Great Man	大男人		
1977	Hot Blood	入冊		
1978	Erotic Dreams of Red Chamber	紅樓春上春	Grandmother Jia	
1978	Edge of Fury	撈家撈女撈上撈		
1978	Dog Bites Dog Bone	狗咬狗骨		
1978	The Big Number	大林巴		
1979	The Secret	瘋劫	Grandmother	
1980	Absolute Monarch	隻手遮天		
1980	Joy to the World	喜劇王	Tung Tung's grandmother	

=== TV series ===
Year	English title	Original title	Role	Notes
1973	Wintergreen	冬綠		
1974	Family, Spring, Autumn	家春秋		
1974	Purple Phantom	紫色幽靈		
1976	Half a Lifelong Romance	半生緣		
1976	Silent Revolution	靜默的革命		
1976	The Unhappy Widow	祥林嫂		
1977	Three Brothers	三兄弟		
1978	Chinese New Horoscope	十二生肖		

== Personal life ==
On May 15, 1990, Lai died in Hong Kong.

== In popular culture ==
In the 1991 film Center Stage, Lai is portrayed by actress Maryanna Yip.
