= Night in the City =

- Film poster
- Directed by: Fei Mu
- Written by: Fei Mu
- Starring: Ruan Lingyu; Jin Yan; Li Keng; Lim Cho Cho
- Production company: Lianhua Film Company
- Release date: January 1933 (China)
- Running time: 65 minutes
- Country: China
- Language: Mandarin

Night in the City (Chinese: 城市之夜; pinyin: Chéngshì zhī yè) (also known as City Nights) was a 1933 Chinese silent film.

== Production background ==
Night in the City was the directorial debut of Fei Mu (who would later go on to achieve lasting fame throughout the 1930s and 1940s) and starred actress Ruan Lingyu and actor Jin Yan. It was highly acclaimed upon its release, particularly by leftist progressives for its social criticisms of city-life. The film is now considered a lost film.

== Plot ==
The film tells the story of a poor family living in China's slums. The daughter, played by Ruan Lingyu, is forced to work at the docks. When it is learned that the slum's landlord is preparing to demolish the entire tenement, the daughter is forced to give up her body to her landlord's son in exchange for a delay in construction. By the end of the film, the daughter, her family, and the landlord's son all leave the city for what they hope will be a better life in the country.

== Preservation ==
Though lost, parts of the film were "recreated" for scenes in Stanley Kwan's 1991 biographical film on Ruan Lingyu's life and career, Center Stage.

== Cast ==
- Ruan Lingyu
- Jin Yan

== See also ==
- List of lost films

== Bibliography ==
- Hjort, Mette, Stanley Kwan's center stage, Hong Kong University Press (2007). ISBN 962-209-791-X.
- Hu, Jubin, Projecting a nation: Chinese national cinema before 1949. Hong Kong University Press (2003). ISBN 962-209-610-7.
