= A Spray of Plum Blossoms =

1931 film

- DVD cover
- Directed by: Bu Wancang
- Written by: Huang Yicuo
- Produced by: Lo Ming-yau
- Starring: Ruan Lingyu; Wang Cilong; Lim Cho Cho; Jin Yan
- Cinematography: Huang Shaofen
- Production company: Lianhua Film Company
- Distributed by: United States: Cinema Epoch (DVD)
- Release date: 1931
- Running time: 100 minutes
- Country: China
- Languages: Silent film Written Chinese and English intertitles

A Spray of Plum Blossoms (Chinese: 一剪梅; pinyin: Yī jiǎn méi) is a 1931 Chinese silent film directed by Bu Wancang and released by Lianhua Film Company. The film is a loose adaptation of William Shakespeare's The Two Gentlemen of Verona, with an adapted screenplay written by Huang Yicuo. It stars Ruan Lingyu, Wang Cilong, Lim Cho Cho, and Jin Yan, It is one of multiple collaborations between Bu Wancang and stars Ruan Lingyu and Korean-born Jin Yan, such as Love and Duty.

Noted for its experimental "Westernized stylings" including surreal decor and long-haired women soldiers, the film features English subtitles that scholars suggest functioned more as cultural signaling than practical translation. Recent scholarship in Chinese cinema studies and global Shakespeare adaptations regard it as an important early example of transnational cinematic dialogue.

== Cast ==
- Ruan Lingyu as Hu Zhilu (Julia), Hu Luting's younger sister, with a lively and naive character, has emotional conflicts with Bai Lede.
- Jin Yan as Hu Luting (Valentine), the heroic young officer, a principled man romantically involved with Shi Luohua.
- Wang Cilong as Bai Lede (Proteus), the antagonist who schemes against Hu Luting.
- Lim Cho Cho as Shi Luohua (Silvia), falls in love with Hu Luting, but faces obstacles from family and society.
- Gao Zhanfei as Liao Di'ao (Tiburio), Hu Luting's comrade-in-arms, a man of bold and straightforward character, fiercely loyal and brave.
- Chen Yen-yen as A Qiao (Lucetta), a sweet-natured supporting character.
- Liu Jiqun as Fatty Liu
- Wang Guilin as General Shi, Lim Cho Cho's elders, representing feudal forces, obstruct the young couple's love.
- Shi Juefei as Li Yi, the chief bandit

== Plot ==
The film tells the story of Bai Lede (Wang Chilong) and Hu Luting (Jin Yan), two military cadets who have been friends since they were children. After graduating, Hu, a playboy uninterested in love, is appointed as a captain in Guangdong and leaves his home town in Shanghai. Bai however, deeply in love with Hu's sister, Hu Zhuli (Ruan Lingyu) stays behind. At Guangdong, Hu falls in love with the local general's daughter, Shi Luohua (Lim Cho Cho), although the general, Shi (Wang Guilin), is unaware of the relationship, and instead wants his daughter to marry the foolish Liao Di'ao (Gao Zhanfei). Meanwhile, Bai's father uses his influence to get Bai posted to Guangdong, and after a sorrowful farewell between himself and Zhuli, he arrives at his new post and instantly falls in love with Luohua. In an effort to have her for himself, Bai betrays his friend, by informing General Shi of his daughter's plans to elope with Hu, leading to Shi dishonourably discharging Hu. Bai tries to win Luohua over, but she is uninterested, only concerned with lamenting the loss of Hu. In the meantime, Hu encounters a group of bandits who ask him to be their leader, to which he agrees, planning on returning for Luohua at some point in the future. Some time passes, and one day, as Luohua, Bai and Liao are passing through the forest, they are attacked. Luohua manages to flee, and Bai pursues her into the forest. They engage in an argument, but just as Bai seems about to lose his temper, Hu intervenes, and he and Luohua are reunited. General Shi arrives in time to see Liao flee the scene, and he now realises that he was wrong to get in the way of the relationship between Hu and his daughter. Hu then forgives Bai his betrayal, and Bai reveals that he has discovered that his only true love is in fact Zhuli back in Shanghai.

== Historical Context ==
The early 1930s was a key period for the Chinese film industry, as filmmakers navigated social and cultural changes in urban China. Shanghai was the center of the Chinese film industry, producing films that reflected the tension between tradition and modernity. Silent films dominated the era, often accompanied by live music in theaters, and filmmakers drew inspiration from both traditional Chinese values and Western cinema, particularly Hollywood.

The first independent cinema was built in 1908 in Shanghai. This independent cinema signalled the beginning of the separation of film from other entertainment. The independent cinema also led to the development of a stable film market in China. Along with the stable film market, there was also a development of film production. In 1925, there were 27 cinemas built in Shanghai, these 27 cinemas accounted for more than a quarter of all the movie theatres in China, Hong Kong and Macau.

The production of A Spray of Plum Blossoms was influenced by media censorship at the time. Director Bu Wancang avoided topics and plot points that would include superstition, supernaturalism, or escapism, like a protagonist learning combat skills from a mysterious source as is common in wuxia films. The combat itself also had to stay grounded, with no sword fighting or special effects that might convey anything supernatural.

== Adaptation from The Two Gentlemen of Verona ==
A Spray of Plum Blossoms adapts the basic plot structure and character relationships of William Shakespeare’s The Two Gentlemen of Verona. Li Weimin notes that both works center on two male friends and two romantic couples. In the film, Hu Lunting and Bai Lede correspond broadly to Valentine and Proteus, while the romantic pairs Hu Lunting–Shi Luohua and Bai Lede–Hu Zhuli echo Valentine–Silvia and Proteus–Julia in Shakespeare’s play. The film also retains several major narrative patterns from the play, including betrayal between male friends, the displacement of the faithful lover, a female character adopting male disguise, and a final resolution through recognition, forgiveness, and the formation of two couples.

Scholars emphasize that the film substantially transforms Shakespeare’s play rather than simply reproducing it. Li describes the adaptation as an example of intertextuality and parody, arguing that the film turns Shakespeare’s comedy into a popular Chinese narrative shaped by moral instruction, comic exaggeration, heroic fantasy, and themes of wealth, beauty, knight-errantry, and power. Bao Yan and Lü Meng similarly interpret the film as a domesticated cross-cultural adaptation. They argue that while the film preserves the main framework of Shakespeare’s play, it changes the characterization, narrative style, and cultural translation of the source text in order to suit the expectations of Chinese audiences. One major change is the shift from Shakespeare’s more psychologically mixed characters to clearer moral types. Bao and Lü argue that Hu Lunting is reshaped as a loyal and responsible hero, while Bai Lede becomes a comic and morally negative “powdered general,” and Diao Liao is made into a more clearly villainous figure.

The film’s bilingual intertitles also contributed to its hybrid form. Jin Haina argues that A Spray of Plum Blossoms involved a “dual-translation” process: Shakespeare’s play was first rewritten as a localized Chinese silent film, and the resulting film was then translated through Chinese-English intertitles. In the English intertitles, the Chinese character names Hu Lunting, Bai Lede, Hu Zhuli, and Shi Luohua are rendered as Valentine, Proteus, Julia, and Silvia, linking the film back to Shakespeare’s original play. At the same time, the translation preserves Chinese cultural elements, such as the transliteration “Yijianmei” and the recurring image of plum flowers.

== Themes ==
=== Visual Symbolism and Motifs ===
The film centers on the love story between Hu Lunting, a graduate of a military academy during the Great Revolution period, and Shi Luohua, daughter of the Guangdong Military Commissioner. Through their narrative, it explores the anxieties of youth confronting social realities and personal relationships, ultimately depicting their transformative growth. The director employs the recurring motif of the plum blossom (meihua), a symbol deeply rooted in Chinese tradition representing resilience, moral purity, and independence. This choice reflects not only the flower’s spiritual connotations but also historical significance. Throughout the film, the plum blossom’s symbolism becomes internalized within the characters’ psyches—human and flower merge into one. This metaphorical fusion embodies the transformation of the two young couples, as the emblematic meaning evolves into a manifestation of their personal growth.

In the film, the art design consistently serves both narrative and thematic purposes. To convey the romantic anxieties and personal transformations of two young couples within their social context, A Spray of Plum Blossoms employs interconnected visual metaphors across key settings: the military academy classroom, the Hu siblings' home, the Military Commissioner's office, Shi Luohua's bedroom, and outdoor scenes. These locations achieve dual artistic purposes - they create physically functional spaces that drive plot progression while simultaneously constructing symbolic landscapes that visually articulate the film's core themes through meaningful semiotics.

The film's production design uses spatial symbolism to reinforce its themes. The military academy classroom establishes an industrial aesthetic through geometric precision - cylindrical pillars, arched doorways, and horizontal lighting strips create a regimented space where stark lighting on Bai Lede's belongings exposes his vulgarity. The Military Commissioner's office subverts traditional Chinese office layouts (which typically feature protective "backing mountain" arrangements) by centering the desk in an elongated Western-style room, visually conveying his unstable authority. In contrast, the Hu siblings' modest, realistically-proportioned Republican-era home appears conspicuously ordinary against these stylized spaces, their smaller environmental scale reflecting social marginalization. Each setting's distinct visual language - from German Expressionist influences to deliberate feng shui violations - serves both narrative and thematic purposes.

=== Gender Hierarchy and Culture Recognition ===
A Spray of Plum Blossoms, different from the original work and previous films, portrays gender equality and women's independence. In the original work Two Gentlemen of Verona, when the Duke found out Valentine's plan to elope with Silvia and expelled Valentine from Milan, Silvia didn’t fight back but could only groan in pain, and beg the Duke with tears. The hierarchy between males and females is unbalanced. However, in this show, when General Shi forces Shi Luohua to marry Liao Di'a, Shi Luohua speaks her own voice and resists marrying a man she has no love for, thereby breaking the social and gender hierarchy. Moreover, when Shi Luohua became the captain, she drilled the army with majesty, commanding groups of male soldiers and demonstrating gender equality. When Hu Luting met bandits and was invited as the leader, he particularly emphasized "no flirting with women" and "no using women as entertainment.", reflecting respectful recognition and treatment for feminine discourse as well as highlighting the quality of women's status indirectly. The portrayal of female characters in the film completely breaks away from the discrimination and prejudice against women in previous films, where female characters mainly were actors or prostitutes, or socialites or empty-headed noblewomen in the 1920s.

Chinese feminist thought began in the late 19th century and early 20th century. The May Fourth Movement was an era of "discovery of human" and the spread of the concepts of "freedom", "democracy", and "equality" greatly promoted the women's liberation movement. A Spray of Plum Blossoms, definitely influenced by the tendency, challenges the conventional idea of “it is a woman's virtue to be ignorant” by presenting a talented and beautiful female character. The film also inspired the emerging trend and created the basic image of the "female knight" (女俠) in the future Wuxia genre.

Scholar Liu Haibo interprets the film’s female characters as part of its transitional identity between older popular cinema and new citizen cinema. Liu argues that the film presents Hu Zhuli and Shi Luohua as modern women whose intelligence, courage, and emotional agency distinguish them from many earlier female character types in old citizen films. The film’s women are not merely passive romantic figures: Shi Luohua directly refuses an unwanted marriage, commands female soldiers, and takes over military duties after Hu Lunting is expelled. Liu therefore reads the film’s gender representation as showing female independence and a degree of gender-equality consciousness, while still retaining elements of moral instruction and reformist ideology.

When Hu Zhilu and Bai Lede farewell Hu Luting at the ferry, famous Chinese actor Mei Lanfang makes a surprising appearance. This scene serves as an appropriate Easter egg for the entire film, representing a cultural symbol familiar to Chinese audiences. His image reflected some plot elements from Shakespeare's original work, especially feminine performances, and distributes them to later plots as the story unfolds. Mei Lanfang visited and performed in the United States in 1930. He was presenting traditional Chinese opera to Western audiences who were largely unfamiliar with it, successfully showing the gender fluidity and the broader theme of cultural "translation" or "migration." The film cleverly incorporated his presence, reflecting a complex relationship between national pride and the aspiration for international recognition.

== Release ==
=== Theatrical ===
The film was released in theatres on July 23, 1931.

=== Home media ===
A Spray of Plum Blossoms was released on all-region DVD by Cinema Epoch as a packaged disc (along with Shi Dongshan's Two Stars in the Milky Way). The disc was released on 11 September 2007.

== See also ==
- One Plum Blossom
