= Li Lili =

Chinese actress and singer (1915–2005)

- 黎莉莉
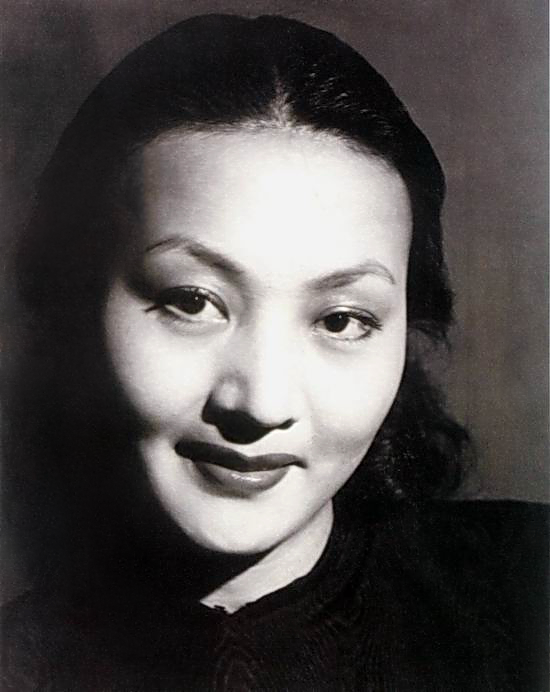
- Li Lili in the 1970s
- Born: Qian Zhenzhen; 2 June 1915; Beijing, China
- Died: 7 August 2005 (aged 90); Beijing, China
- Occupation(s): Singer, actress
- Parent: Qian Zhuangfei
- Awards: Special Honor Award 1991 (Chinese Academy of Motion Picture Arts)

Li Lili (Chinese: 黎莉莉; 2 June 1915 – 7 August 2005) was a Chinese film actress and singer. Her films Playthings, The Great Road and Storm on the Border were blockbusters of the 1930s and 1940s. She was sometimes called "China's Mae West".

Her films Volcanic Passions (1932), Playthings (Little Toys) (1933), Daybreak (1933), Sports Queen (1934), and The Great Road (The Big Road) (1934) are available with English subtitles on YouTube.

== Biography ==
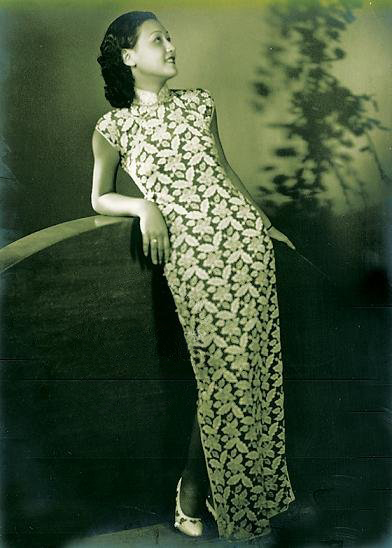
Li Lili in the 1930s

Li was born Qian Zhenzhen (Chinese: 钱蓁蓁) in Beijing, 1915. Her father, Qian Zhuangfei, was a famed secret agent and member of the Chinese Communist Party. In 1927, she moved to Shanghai, where her father encouraged her to join the China Song & Dance Troupe, later renamed Bright Moon Song and Dance Troupe. Li Jinhui, was the conductor of the troupe and adopted her as his god-daughter, and she changed her name to Li Lili.

The troupe was very popular in 1920s Shanghai. Li Lili, Wang Renmei, Xue Lingxian (薛玲仙) and Hu Jia (胡笳) were known as Bright Moon's "Four Divas" (四大天王). After troupe was merged into the Lianhua Film Company in 1931, Li became an actress. She starred in Sun Yu's 1932 Loving Blood of the Volcano, set in the South Seas with plenty of dancing, which allowed Li to play to her strengths. She and Wang Renmei then acted together in Poetry Written on the Banana Leaf.

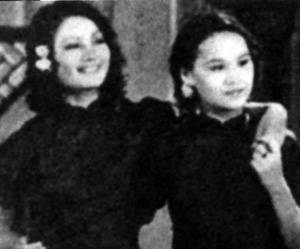
Li Lili and Chen Yen-yen in 1934's 'The Big Road'

Sun Yu wrote Queen of Sports and The Big Road for her to star in, and she won audiences with her fashionable and energetic image, gaining the nickname "Sweet Big Sister". Sun Yu's Daybreak (1933) was one of her early star vehicles. Magazines characterized her as being interested in music and books. From 1935 to 1937, she starred in eight more films with the Lianhua Film Company.

Li Lili, together with Wang Renmei and Xu Lai, her former colleagues at the Bright Moon Troupe, were the earliest stars to portray the energetic, wholesome, and sexy "country girl" prototype, which became one of the most popular figures in Chinese cinema, and later inherited by the cinema of Hong Kong.

After war with Japan broke out in 1937, she joined the China Film Studio in Chongqing, China's wartime capital. There she met and married Luo Jingyu, a section head, who became head of the studio. In 1939, she filmed Cai Chusheng's Orphan Island Paradise in Hong Kong; it was another hit. Back in Chongqing, she starred in another hit film Storm on the Border, for which she was highly praised.

Li travelled to the United States in 1946, studying acting at The Catholic University of America in Washington, language and singing in New York, and make-up at the University of California. She also observed filmmaking in Hollywood.

She returned to China, and to acting at the Beijing Film Studio. In 1955, she studied at Beijing Film Academy, and later taught in the acting department. Her son, Luo Dan, married the daughter of Marshal Ye Jianying; Ye became China's head of state in the late 1970s.

During the Cultural Revolution, Li and her husband, Luo Jingyu, were denounced and tortured on the orders of Mao's wife Jiang Qing. Li had acted with her, and outshone her, in films such as Blood on Wolf Mountain. Li later told her family that she refused to denounce anyone.

In 1991, she was given the "Special Honour Award" by the Chinese Academy of Motion Picture Arts.

By the end of her life, Li Lili was the last living Chinese movie star from the silent era. She died of a heart attack in Xuanwu Hospital, Beijing on August 7, 2005, aged 90.

== Filmography ==
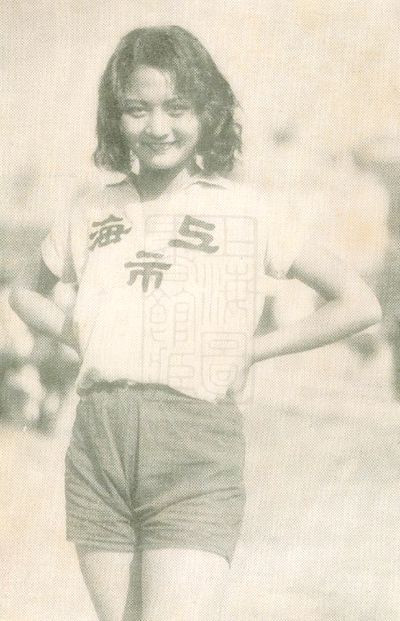
Li Lili in the 1934 film Queen of Sports

Year	English title	Original title	Role	Notes
1926	A Hero Hidden in Yanshan Mountain	燕山俠隱	Ma Muying	Lost
1931	A Spray of Plum Blossoms	一剪梅	Piano player	uncredited
1931	Two Stars	銀漢雙星		
1932	Poetry Written on the Banana Leaf	芭蕉葉上詩		Lost
1932	Volcanic Passions	火山情血		
1933	Daybreak	天明	Ling Ling	
1933	Little Toys	小玩意	Zhu'er	
1934	Queen of Sports	體育皇后	Lin Ying	
1934	The Big Road	大路		
1935	National Customs	國風	Zhang Tao	
1935	An Abandoned Woman	秋扇明燈		
1936	Return to Nature	到自然去		
1936	Bloodshed on Wolf Mountain	狼山喋血記		
1937	Lianhua Symphony	聯華交響曲		Segment 6: "Ghost" (鬼)
1937	The Lost Pearl	人海遺珠		
1937	So Busy	如此繁華		
1937	Vistas of Art	藝海風光		Part 3: "Song & Dance Class" (歌舞班)
1938	Fight to the Last	熱血忠魂		
1939	Orphan Island Paradise	孤島天堂		
1940	Storm on the Border	塞上風雲	Jin Hua'er	
1944	Undaunted Land	氣壯山河	Ma Fengqi	
1944	Blood on the Cherry Blossoms	血濺櫻花		
1954	Capture by Stratagem Mount Hua	智取華山		
1963	Fen River Flows On	汾水長流		Assistant director
