= The Goddess (1934 film) =

1934 Chinese silent film directed by Wu Yonggang

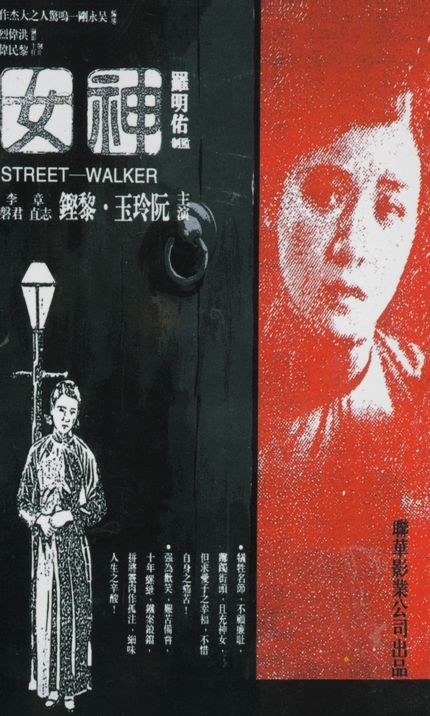
- Film poster
- Traditional Chinese: 神女
- Simplified Chinese: 神女
- Literal meaning: goddess (also a euphemism for a beautiful or educated female prostitute)
- Hanyu Pinyin: shénnǚ
- Directed by: Wu Yonggang
- Written by: Wu Yonggang
- Produced by: Lo Ming-yau; Tian Minwei
- Starring: Ruan Lingyu; Zhang Zhizhi
- Cinematography: Hong Weilie
- Production company: Lianhua Film Company
- Release date: December 7, 1934 (China)
- Running time: 85 minutes
- Country: China
- Languages: Silent; Written Chinese intertitles

The Goddess

The Goddess (Chinese: 神女; pinyin: Shen nu) is a 1934 Chinese silent film released by the Lianhua Film Company (United Photoplay). The film tells the story of an unnamed woman, who lives as a streetwalker by night and devoted mother by day in order to get her young son an education amid social injustice in the streets of Shanghai, China. It stars Ruan Lingyu in one of her final roles, and was directed by Wu Yonggang. Lo Ming Yau produced the film and Hong Weilie was the cinematographer.

The public responded with enthusiasm, largely due to Ruan Lingyu's popularity in Shanghai in the early 1930s. Four years after the original release of The Goddess, Yonggang Wu remade the film as Yanzhi Lei with changes made to the cast, the setting, and parts of the storyline. After Stanley Kwan's revival of Ruan Lingyu's story through the biopic Center Stage (1991) starring Maggie Cheung as Ruan, widespread public interest in the Chinese classic cinema was reinvigorated .

Goddess is considered one of the best-known films of China's cinematic golden age, and was named as one of China's top 100 films by the Hong Kong Film Awards in 2005.

== Plot ==
An unnamed single mother works as a prostitute to support herself and her baby son in 1930s Shanghai. One night, fleeing from a police sweep, she runs into the room of a thug called, "the Boss", who then forces her to have sex with him in exchange for hiding her from the police.

She agrees and later, the Boss, with two of his henchmen, tracks her down and shows up at her place and claims her as his own private property. From then on, he steals all her earnings to finance his gambling habit. The mother attempts to flee, to avoid him and find a respectable job, by moving to a new apartment. However, after pawning her jewelry to buy a toy for her son, she returns home to find out that the Boss tracked her down again. He threatens her, frightening her by claiming to have sold her son and the mother decides to submit to him again to retrieve her son. While living with the thug, she secretly stashes her nights’ earnings behind a hole in the wall, in order to provide her son with an education.

After years, she enrolls her son in a private school. But soon after, other kids at school begin to bully him and call him a "bastard" and the parents also learn that the boy's mother is a prostitute, which leads them to send reproachful letters to the school, demanding the school to expel the boy, complaining that they cannot allow their children to study together with a child from mother with a disreputable profession. Without a choice, the principal pays a visit to the goddess’ home to investigate the accusations of her profession, but the rumors prove to be true. As he sets his mind on expelling the boy, he is swayed by the mother's genuine love for her son and her heartfelt cries, questioning why her son cannot receive what is best for him. Realizing his mistake, the principal goes back to the school to convince other members of the school committee but they do not listen to him. Upon his failure, the principal resigns from his position and the boy's expulsion goes through.

Subsequently, the mother plans to move to a new place with her son where nobody will recognize who they are. When she tries to take out her savings from the hole in the wall, she realizes that the thug has stolen the money to support his gambling habits. When she asks him to return her money, he mocks her and informs that he has already spent it. In a moment of anger, she inadvertently kills the thug by smashing a bottle on his head.

In the end, the mother is convicted of the murder of the thug, the Boss, and sentenced to 12 years in jail. When the school principal reads of this news in a newspaper, he visits her behind prison bars and promises her that he would adopt her son from the orphanage and raise him well, providing a good education. Worried for her son's future and not wanting him to be burdened with his mother's dark history, she asks the principal to tell her son that his mother is dead. After the principal leaves, the young mother smiles as she envisions a bright future for her son, but her smile quickly fades away as she comes back to the cold reality of her life in the prison cell.

== Cast ==
- Ruan Lingyu as the "Goddess", a loving mother who is forced into prostitution in order to provide for her young son.
- Zhang Zhizhi as "Boss" Zhang, a thug who exploits the Goddess and acts as her pimp after he offers her protection from the police.
- Lai Hang as the Goddess's son, who faces discrimination as he grows up because of his mother's occupation.
- Li Junpan as the Principal, a well-meaning older man who stands up for the Goddess' son, after the members of the school board discovers that his mother is a prostitute and want to expel him. The old principal also represents the voice of the Director Wu Yonggang.

== Title ==
The film's title contains several layers of meaning. The word "goddess" is meaningful in that it represents the dual identities of the main character. During the day, the word refers the character as a divine "goddess," a loving mother and guardian for her son, while at night, it refers to her occupation; the Chinese term shennü also serves as an old euphemism for prostitute. At the time of the film's release, this euphemism was particularly relevant as Shanghai was believed to be home to 100,000 women working as prostitutes. Wu's use of the euphemism portrays his views of seeing beyond the stereotype of the fallen women and calls attention to the themes of class struggle and social inequality through the complex character of Ruan Lingyu, who is both victimized and empowered at times. Although she faces the prejudice of the society, she continuously fights against social pressure and attempts to seek justice in the system.

== The Goddess in historical Shanghai ==
In The Goddess, Ruan appears in front of the camera wearing a cheongsam (also called a qipao), a popular style worn by women since the 1920s China. By the 1930s, qipao became the exemplary dress for modern women in urban Shanghai. Well-to-do women, courtesans, dance hostesses, actresses, girl students, and female workers almost all accepted the characteristic style of qipao.

They dressed in qipao along with short bob or permed hair, stockings, high heels, and makeup not so different as seen on the Western flappers. In this sense, Qipao represents the blend of Chinese culture and Western colonization and reflects Shanghai's weakened state. Qipao are also published in pictorial magazines, fashion designs enriched clothing styles. The fetish for appearance and fashion occurred in the cinema together with the female-featured advertisement calendar posters (yuefenpai 月份牌).

As early examples of Chinese commercial advertising, calendar posters exclusively portray women, many wearing Qipao, as the conveyor of modern marketing messages. They include pictures of women seated with crossed legs, a specific bodily posture that, both in China and in the West, can be read both as a signifier of modernity and as a possible reminder of sexual availability. Calendar posters contributed to create a hybrid format of gender representation where women are portrayed simultaneously as both subject and object of market and sexual consumption, and more precisely where "the boundaries of subject and object, active and passive, owner and owned, unique and general, break down in an endless reflexive interplay of consumer and consumed.

Qipao, as a style of the commodified women on the calendar posters reflects a society which objectified female bodies as a source of pleasure and turned them into tradable commodities which led to the rise of prostitution in Shanghai. Based on the data collected from the sociologist Gamble: In 1917, Shanghai had the highest population of prostitutes compared to other cities, such as London, Berlin and Beijing. Records show that in 1935, there was 1 woman out of 9 - 15 female adults who resorted to prostitution in order to make a living. These numbers are the reason why Wu chose Shanghai as the Goddess’ background, to depict Shanghai's submission to foreign forces and the fallen women of Shanghai. On the other hand, prostitutes, as the visual harbinger of Chinese modernity became the negative side of this metropolitan city, as their roles took on meanings of the "victimized" and the "disorderly."

In this film, Ruan played a prostitute, standing on the night street with her long qipao. However, she was not fashioned as sexy in the traditional sense. While the film tells a story about a prostitute, it did not focus on the "erotic implications" of prostitution, not to mention the connection with moral decline. Instead, it focuses on the suffering of Ruan's character from the prejudice of the education system, the humiliation from neighbours and the abuses of the thug. The temporary status of prostitute and implication of qipao together depict the suffering of these fallen women as characterized by Ruan's character.

== Self-censorship ==
During the time period revolving around the goddess, a large fraction of Shanghai's female population had been designated as prostitutes—one-thirteenth of the female population. Having spent his time observing these "street walkers" and the fact that much of Wu Yonggang's early experience in cinema education revolved around the fallen women genre. Wu Yonggang had initially wished to write a screenplay to draw sympathy for them.

Despite Wu's wishes to show more of the realities of the women in Shanghai, he was forced to undergo self-censorship in order to navigate the diffuse and pervasive anxieties about ideology, politics and market confronting China's filmmakers in 1934. This is shown by Wu Yonggang response to contemporary critics, "‘When I first set out to write about the goddesses, I wished to show more of their real lives, but circumstances would not permit me to do so."

The circumstances that he refers to were the strict conservative restrictions and state surveillance in place by China's Kuomintang (KMT) Nationalist Party during the film's production in October and November 1934. When the KMT came to power, they set up the "Film Censorship Law" in 1930, and the Film Censorship committee (FCC) in 1931.

In the 1930s New Life Movement, film makers were encouraged to promote Confucian values, along with ideals of self-sacrifice and discipline in everyday life. Films would have to present their scripts to the FCC to ensure the upholding of New Life Movement values. The New Life Movement also emphasized the censoring of illicit scenes. The female lead of Goddess is a prostitute, but there are never any illicit scenes, and are implied instead (the Goddess’ child). Despite the lack of evidence which pointed to any formal orders requesting changes to Goddess, Wu may still have felt the governmental pressure, as reported by Lianhua's weekly newsletter that New Life organizational committee members, as well as high-ranking government ministers like Chen Gongbo, had paid several visits to the set half-way through the shooting of the Goddess.

== The Confucian convention: motherhood in a patriarchal society ==
This film contains several themes alluding to certain ideas that had been present in China. In a short essay published before the film's release in 1934, Wu writes,

"When starting to write the script, I wanted to focus more on ['the prostitutes’] actual life experiences. But my circumstances made this impossible. To hide this weakness, I shifted to maternal love while consigning prostitution to the background by depicting an illegal prostitute struggling between two lives for the sake of her child. I used an exploitative thug to propel the plot. I also put words of justice into the mouth of an upright school headmaster, letting him expose the social cause of prostitution. I did not offer a solution to the problem."

He intentionally used motherhood as an entry point for a more gritty examination of the conditions for prostitutes in Shanghai in the 1930s.

While this film is reminiscent of the genre conventions seen in the movies containing "fallen woman" figure, it also draws on the questions of motherhood at the front and centre. The film starts with an Art Deco image in the back, with the title superimposed on this image. This image portrays a naked woman with her hands tied behind her back, leaning forward over the naked infant. This portrayal of a woman leaning over the child seems to recall the theme of motherhood to the viewers’ minds. This image reappears as the background for later intertitles, signifying the importance of the motherhood as a theme in this film. "Maternal melodramas", in which mothers sacrifice themselves for their children was a Hollywood staple since the 1920s and China had a similar motivation for this theme; Confucian convention taught women to be a "virtuous wife and good mother" (xianqi linangmu). This model of womanhood was revived by China's Nationalist government which launched its campaign, "New Life Movement" in February 1934.

On the top of this conservative model, another long-standing model of idealized womanhood seems to be at work in this film, and that is the legend of "Mencius's mother." The famous story named "Three Moves", in which Mencius's mother strives to keep her son away from bad influences, explains that Mencius's mother decided to move when she noticed that Mencius started to imitate the actions of the funeral director while they were living near a cemetery and when they moved to a place which was near a marketplace, her son began to imitate the loud voice of salespeople. Therefore, Mencius's mother decided to move to a place which was close to a school. Finally, Mencius began to imitate the students and teachers working on their study.

The film also reflects a strong sense of patriarchy in the way that the problem the mother is facing is resolved. The film portrays the elderly principal, who is a man, stepping in to resolve the dilemma for the mother. He stands up for her son when the school board tries to expel the son. Facing directly the camera, he says, "It's true the child's mother is a streetwalker, but this is due to broader social problems ... Education is our responsibility, and we must rescue this child from adversity." The son is still expelled and the mother ends up in a prison cell, and when it seems there is no hope for the powerless mother, the principal reappears to provide the ultimate solution to her; he offers to become a surrogate father to her son and raise him himself. Film historians have argued that this conclusion and narrative leave the patriarchal system unchanged and assert the primacy of male agency, where the male with a position of respectability and authority tries to correct the wrong and turns into a savior, intervening in the victimized female's situation to offer the ultimate solution to the problem. While one could say that this film is reflecting the reality Chinese people during that particular time experienced in everyday life, it also seems to act as an agency to reinforce the central ideas of patriarchists; the female mother is vulnerable and in need of help from the male principal, who is able to resolve the problems for her.

== Hollywood influence ==
Many early Shanghai-produced films were heavily influenced by Hollywood, a characteristic commonly seen in the filmography of the Lianhua Film Company. Goddess remains one of their most well-known films, and exhibits some of the camera techniques characteristic to Hollywood that can also be identified as part of the Lianhua Film style. Through the use of intertitles, lighting and distinctive close up shots of the protagonist's face, Cinematographer Hong Weilie humanizes the Goddess, creating a strong emotional connection between her character and the audience.

More than just being influenced by cinematic techniques originating in Hollywood, Goddess also borrows generic conventions, particularly from the "fallen woman" films popularized in the 1920s and 30s like Stella Dallas (1925),Stella Dallas (1937), Madame X (1929), The Sin of Madelon Claudet (1931) and Blonde Venus (1932). Some similarities include the Goddess's fall from grace in society, although in contrast to many fallen women films this occurs before the start of the film, and her devotion to her child, willing to make great personal sacrifices to ensure a better life for him. However, while Goddess owes a narrative debt to these earlier Hollywood films, its quality has been enough to immortalize it as a worthy contemporary of them, particularly based on the strength of Ruan Lingyu's performance. In contemporary international film festivals, Ruan Lingyu has been featured alongside other prolific "fallen woman" actresses such as Marlene Dietrich and Barbara Stanwyck, and even nicknamed the "Garbo of the Orient", a reference to Greta Garbo.

== Reception ==
Wu's directorial debut was received well back in 1934. Ruan Lingyu's popularity was cited as an influence, as well as the emotional appeal, with the Cultural Revolution affecting the acceptability of film content and styles. Interest in the "classic" film era for Chinese cinema returned internationally after Maggie Cheung's portrayal of Ruan Lingyu in the biopic Center Stage (1991), which recreates one of its scenes.

== Cinematic techniques ==
=== Montage ===
The film contains montages (rapidly cut images that often condense but sometimes expand time and space).

- Montage of iconic images of the streets: a passing tram car, people on a busy sidewalk in front of a window display of a mannequin in a swimsuit, and a fortune teller. (5:03 - 5:24) The montage here demonstrates that the Night Shanghai is a bustling, lively place where a variety of shops, peddlers are doing business. The fallen woman, Ruan's character, is also trying to make a living similar to the others.
- Rapid montage of the police conducting a sweep on the streets for some unknown reasons. (8:51 - 9:15). This montage indicates the panic and fearfulness of the crowd and Ruan's character as they run, hide and escape in fast paces. It also shows that the residents do not have a positive impression on the police in 1930s China. Instead, they are scared of the police.

Matte image A type of special effect in which one area of the image is filmed, either by shooting a real background directly or painting one and shooting the painting while the remaining area is left blank by blocking a corresponding area of the lens, the blank area is then filled by filming with the opposite area being blocked, after which the two areas are combined in processing. In the perspective of the grinning thug, the Shanghai nightscape appears, and what makes him smile is a vision of the goddess, smiling and radiant over the city of night. (12:26) The matte image, made using the same double-exposure technique used in Laborer's love (1922), juxtaposes city and woman. Seen through the eyes of this lustful man, the city itself is personified as a sexually inviting woman who is out there and available. The matte image also demonstrates the prejudices that the vulnerable fallen women experience in Shanghai as powerful male oppression can perceive them as personal possessions arbitrarily.

Framing The thug is often framed, from a low angle in medium close up, which emphasizes his larger than life presence. He literally takes up more of the screen space. When Ruan's character picks up the broken toy on the floor and looks up at the thug, the camera cuts to a shot of the mother crouching with her child framed between the man's legs. (24:46) Ruan's character's crouching position between the man's legs demonstrates that she, as a victimized, weak woman is unable to escape from the terrifying and powerful man.

Set Design: Show the simplicity of the goddess's living quarters: a bed, a table, a few chairs, a hot water bottle, a couple of dresses and a few other possessions. (2:01 - 2:21) (2:56) When the fat, towering thug is in the room with her, the interior space becomes claustrophobic. (22:25). This indicates that the thug, as a significant figure, invades Ruan and her son, a suffering woman and a poor child's small, personal space as a male oppressor. Set design is stripped down to bare iconography - this is a space in which four nameless people - a woman, her child, a male oppressor and a male savior act out an elemental moral drama.

== Production release ==
- December 7, 1934 Shanghai, China
- April 22, 2014 China (4th Beijing International Film Festival) (restored version)
- June 15, 2014 China (Shanghai International Film Festival) (restored version)
- June 24, 2014 France (French Film archive) (restored version)
- October 14, 2014 British (London Film Festival) (restored version)

== Other release versions ==
- In 2003, a DVD was released of the film, made from 35mm prints provided by The China Film Archive. This version came with a newly composed piano score by Kevin Purrone.
- BFI released the film on DVD for UK Region 2 users in April 2017 with a superbly recorded orchestral score composed by Zou Ye.
- The University of Hong Kong Press repackaged the DVD film in 2005, combining it with a biography of Ruan Lingyu called Ruan Lingyu: The Goddess of Shanghai. While the original film only used Chinese intertitles for the silent film, both 2003 and 2005 versions of the DVD have English intertitles available.
