= Lim Cho-cho =

Chinese Canadian actress (1905–1979)

- Portrait of Lim
- Born: Florence Lim; January 21, 1905; Victoria, British Columbia, Canada
- Died: February 16, 1979 (aged 74); British Hong Kong
- Other names: Lin Chu-chu, Lam Cho-cho, Lam Chor-chor, Lim Cho-cho, Lin Chuchu, Lin Cho-cho, C. C. Lin, Florence Lim
- Spouse: Lai Man-Wai (m. 1920–1953)
- Children: 9
- Relatives: Lai Hang (son)

Chinese name
- Chinese: 林楚楚
Transcriptions
Standard Mandarin
- Hanyu Pinyin: Lín Chǔchǔ
Yue: Cantonese
- Jyutping: Lam^{4} Co^{2} Co^{2}

Original Chinese name
- Chinese: 林美意
Transcriptions
Standard Mandarin
- Hanyu Pinyin: Lín Měiyì
Yue: Cantonese
- Jyutping: Lam^{4} Mei^{5} Ji^{3}

Florence Lim (21 January 1905 – 16 February 1979), better known as Lim Cho-cho, was a Chinese Canadian actress in the cinema of the Republic of China and British Hong Kong from 1925 to 1954. She was the second wife of filmmaker Lai Man-Wai and the mother of actors Lai Hang and Lai Suen. Gigi Lai is her granddaughter.

== Early life ==
Florence Lim was born in Victoria, British Columbia, Canada, where her grandfather, an immigrant from Xinhui (now part of Jiangmen), Guangdong, China, owned a rice shop. Her father died when she was 3. She attended Chinese Public School in Victoria which allowed her to be proficient in both English and Chinese. When she was 9, her widowed mother went to Hong Kong to receive medical treatment, and at age 12 Lim joined her in Hong Kong, having completed primary school. In Hong Kong she enrolled in Ying Wa Girls' School. One of her classmates named Lai Hang-kau (who would later become known as Lai Cheuk-cheuk) introduced her to her uncle Lai Man-Wai. Even though he was 12 years her senior and already married, Lim married him as his second wife in 1920, when she was 15.

== Career ==
Lim's acting career started in Hong Kong when she played the lead role in Rouge (1925), the first film produced by her husband's China Sun Motion Picture Company. In 1926, China Sun relocated to Shanghai, and there Lim continued to star in silent films such as A Poet from the Sea (1927) and Romance of the Western Chamber (1927). Her credits after China Sun became the Lianhua Film Company in 1930 included A Spray of Plum Blossoms (1931), Song of China (1935), National Customs (1935), and Song of a Kind Mother (1937). Lim particularly excelled in mother roles. Her son Lai Hang also appeared in many films around this time. In 1931, she also acted in the Indian film Kamar-Al-Zaman, an adaptation of a tale from the Arabian Nights directed by Shah G. Agha, where she appeared in the role of princess Budur.

During the Second Sino-Japanese War (1937–1945), the Lais first returned to Hong Kong when Japan invaded Shanghai in 1937. In Hong Kong Lim continued to act in films, many patriotic and anti-Japanese in nature. Following Japan's invasion of Hong Kong in 1941, the family escaped to mainland China, first to Chikan, Kaiping, Guangdong, where at one point Lim had to peddle old clothes on the street to make ends meet. When Japanese soldiers overran Kaiping in 1943, they fled again, this time to Guilin, Guangxi, where they ran a photographic studio. After the war ended, the family returned to Hong Kong, and Lim acted again for another 8 years. She retired after her husband's 1953 death to raise their 9 children. She visited mainland China in the 1970s before her death in Hong Kong in 1979.

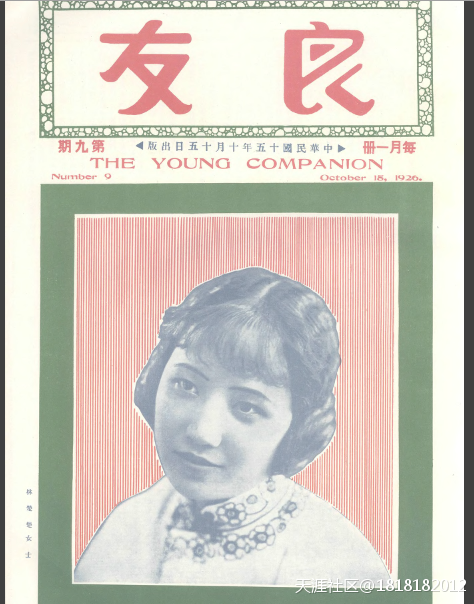
Lim on the cover of The Young Companion, September 1926.

== Filmography ==
Year	English title	Original title	Role	Notes
1925	Rouge	胭脂	Rouge	Lost
1926	Why Not Her	玉潔冰清	Qian Mengqi	Lost
1926	The God of Peace	和平之神		Lost
1927	A Poet from the Sea	海角詩人	Yin Meizhen	Partially lost
1927	A Reviving Rose	復活的玫瑰		Lost
1927	Romance of the Western Chamber	西廂記	Cui Yingying	Partially lost
1928	Avalokitesvara's Way	觀音得道		Lost
1928	Five Revengeful Girls	五女復仇		Lost
1928	The Retrieval of Huang Leung	再世因緣		Lost
1928	Mulan Joins the Army	木蘭從軍		Lost
1930	Dream of the Ancient Capital	故都春夢		Lost
1931	A Spray of Plum Blossoms	一剪梅	Shi Luohua (Sylvia)	
1932	Conscienceless	人道	Wu Ruolian	Lost
1932	Another Dream of the Ancient Capital	續故都春夢		Lost
1933	Night in the City	城市之夜		Lost
1934	Life	人生		Lost
1935	National Customs	國風	Zhang Jie	
1935	A Little Angel	小天使		
1935	Song of China	天倫	Grandmother	
1936	Mother's Love	母愛	Liu Fen	
1936	Gateways of Body and Spirit	靈肉之門		
1937	A New-Comer's Way	新人道		
1937	Song of a Kind Mother	慈母曲	Mother	
1937	The Bomber Wen Shengcai	溫生才炸孚琦		
1938	Love in Wartime	戰雲情淚		
1939	Scent of a Woman	女兒香		
1940	The General	岳飛	Yue Fei's mother	
1940	Flower in a Sea of Blood	血海花		
1941	The Good Father	天涯慈父		
1941	On My Own	陌路妻兒	Madam Chan	
1941	Song of Retribution	正氣歌	Wang Zhiming's mother	
1946	The Storm	大雷雨		
1947	Li Chunhua	麗春花		
1949	Gia Liang Kiang Be My Destiny	靜靜的嘉陵江		
1953	How the Valiant Dog Saved the Pretty Girl	義犬救美		also co-producer
1954	Better Your Better Half	改造太太	Ling Ping's mother	

== In popular culture ==
In the 1991 film Center Stage, Lim is portrayed by Cecilia Yip, who spoke Cantonese, Mandarin and English in her role.
