= Song of China =

- Film poster
- Directed by: Fei Mu; Lo Ming-yau
- Written by: Zhong Shigen
- Produced by: Lo Ming-yau
- Starring: Zheng Junli; Chen Yanyan; Lim Cho-cho; Zhang Yi; Lai Cheuk-cheuk
- Cinematography: Wang Shaofen
- Music by: Wei Zhongle
- Production company: Lianhua Film Company
- Release dates: 6 September 1935 (China); 9 November 1936 (U.S.)
- Running time: 65 minutes
- Country: China
- Language: Mandarin

Song of China (Chinese: 天倫; pinyin: Tiān lún), also known as Filial Piety, is a 1935 Chinese drama film directed by Fei Mu and Luo Mingyou for the Lianhua Film Company.

Unlike earlier Lianhua films that railed against traditional society, Song of China is representative of the New Life Movement of Chiang Kai-shek, which celebrates traditional Confucian values.

Song of China is one of the few Chinese films made in the 1930s to be screened in the United States. The film is available with English translation on YouTube.

== Plot ==
A successful businessman (Zheng Junli) returns to his family home to be with his dying father. On his deathbed, the father imparts final wisdom to his son, urging him to extend the love and devotion he shows to his family toward serving the greater good of society. The father’s dying wish is for his son to use his wealth and position to help others, particularly the poor and disadvantaged.

Inspired by his father’s teachings, the businessman decides to honor this request by relocating his extended family from their comfortable urban life to the countryside. There, he establishes a school for impoverished children who cannot afford education, as well as a sanctuary for elderly people who have no family to care for them. His goal is to create a model community based on traditional Confucian values of filial piety, education, and social responsibility. However, his adult children, accustomed to the conveniences and entertainment of city life, resist this dramatic change. They find rural life boring and restrictive compared to the modern pleasures of urban society. Despite their father’s attempts to instill the same values that his own father had taught him, the children rebel against these traditional teachings and eventually abandon the countryside to return to the city. Left behind but undeterred, the businessman continues his philanthropic work, maintaining the school and sanctuary according to his father’s wishes. When his wayward children eventually return home, having perhaps learned from their experiences in the city, he receives them with patience and understanding. Following the cycle of wisdom passed down through generations, he offers them the same counsel his own father had given him, hoping that they too will eventually embrace the Confucian ideals of duty, compassion, and service to others. The businessman’s grandchildren show more receptiveness to these traditional teachings than their parents had initially demonstrated, suggesting the continuing transmission of moral values across generations.

== Cast ==
- Shang Kwah-Wu as Sun Liting (尚禮庭) - father/grandfather
- Mei Ling as Yutang's wife
- Zheng Junli as Yutang (孫玉堂) - the grandson as a young man
- Zhang Yi as Sun Shaoting (孫紹庭) - the son
- Chen Yen-yen as Sun Ruoyan (孫若燕) - the daughter
- Lim Cho Cho as Mrs. Sun - the mother/ grandmother
- Lai Cheuk-Cheuk as daughter-in-law
- Li Keng as Yutang - the grandson as a child
- Shi Juefei - Sun Liting's father

== Background ==
Song of China was made by Lianhua Film Company, one of the biggest studios in Shanghai in the early 1930s. They didn’t just want to make entertaining movies—they wanted something with meaning. The company's founding motto was "Promote art; spread culture; propagate education for the people; save national industry," reflecting its ambition to use cinema for social and national renewal. Lianhua had a reputation for bringing in talented filmmakers and making films that touched on issues like family, society, even poverty. The film was directed by Fei Mu and Luo Mingyou. Fei Mu later became famous for Spring in a Small Town (1948), which film critics now call one of the greatest Chinese films ever. Even before that, Fei’s early films—including Song of China—show he was interested in how cinema could explore emotional ties and traditional values.

Luo Mingyou was more than a co-director—he also ran Lianhua as its founder and general manager. A Protestant and son of a wealthy businessman, Luo was connected to Guomindang (Chinese Nationalist Party) circles and, by 1930, already owned over twenty cinemas before moving into production. He believed cinema could help shape society, and built Lianhua into a big studio, even buying smaller studios across Shanghai and Hong Kong to do it. The company's structure, integrating production, distribution, and exhibition in a national network, was directly inspired by the Hollywood studio model.

All that matters, because when Song of China came out in 1935, it felt different from some of Lianhua’s other work—it was quieter, traditional, more about family and duty. The film closely aligned with ideals of Chiang Kai-shek's New Life Movement, promoting Confucian values such as filial piety ("老吾老及人之老，幼吾幼及人之幼") as the moral foundation of the nation. It happened to match what the New Life Movement was going for, so while it wasn’t officially propaganda, it fit right in with what public culture was pushing at the time.

== Production and directorial style ==
Song of China was produced by the Lianhua Film Company and co-directed by Fei Mu (sometimes credited as assistant director) and studio founder of Luo Mingyou. As Fei Mu's earliest surviving feature film, it represents an important early work in which the director began developing his distinctive lyrical and ethically oriented style.

== Thematic analysis ==
Scholar Wei Liu analyzes how Song of China spatializes Confucian morality through contrasting chronotypes: the space of propriety (embodied by the grandfather and the rural model community), the space of misconduct (represented by the urbanized younger generation), and the liminal space of moral transformation. This spatial construction extends Confucian ethical values from the individual and family to the larger society.

== Political and social context of 1930s China ==
China was emerging form its early 1930s political disunity and warlordism. During the Northern Expedition, which extended the control of the Nationalists (Guomindang) over much of the country, pangs of political instability and social tension persisted.

Cities like Shanghai were transformed by rapid urbanization. Modernity and traditionalism became increasingly evident in Western consumption culture and new social lifestyles, resulting in a conflict between modern and traditional values.

The movement focused by Chiang Kai-shek in 1934 emphasized Confucian values like filial piety, moral self-cultivation, and social responsibility, while also urging proper behavior in daily life and championing modern nationalism and social discipline. Dirlik argues that the movement was an attempt to mold Chinese society through the ideology education and moral regulation.

Many of the themes that appear in Song of China, such as filial piety, family hierarchy and moral self-cultivation, are similar to many of the values of society that were promoted during the New Life Movement period.

== Audience reactions and legacy ==
Song of China focused on themes of filial piety, family responsibility, and social harmony, values that were widely promoted during the New Life Movement era.

There’s not a lot of detailed box office data, but we do know the film made it to some international screens. Zhang Zhen writes that it was one of the few Chinese films from that period shown in the U.S., where some viewers appreciated its calm and respectful portrayal of Chinese family life. It wasn’t a major commercial success, but it distinguished itself as a quiet, earnest film in an era when such films were not the norm. Rea also notes that it helped shape the perception of China from abroad—at least in terms of cultural exports—before politically driven films took over later years.

Film scholars today tend to look at Song of China as more than just an old moral film. It’s seen as an example of how early Chinese directors tried using movies to express values—like family, care, and doing good for others—instead of just making something fun to watch. Rea points out that this kind of approach is very different from the louder, more political movies that came later on.

The film was also shown outside China and became one of the better-known Chinese Films on its period among international audiences. Rea also notes that it helped shape the perception of China from abroad---at least in terms of cultural exports---before politically driven films took over later years.

== International reception ==
In 1936, Song of China was released in the United States, where it was screened at venues such as the Little Carnegie Playhouse in New York. It was one of the earliest Chinese films marketed to general American audiences and received attention for its restrained performances and calm portrayal of Chinese family life.
