= Zhu Shilin =

Chinese film director

Zhu Shilin (Chinese: 朱石麟; pinyin: Zhū Shílín) (27 July 1899 – 5 January 1967), also romanised as Chu Shek Lin, was a Chinese film director and screenwriter, born in Taicang, Jiangsu, China. Zhu began his career in the thriving film industry of Shanghai, directing actresses like Ruan Lingyu with the Lianhua Film Company. After the war, Zhu moved to Hong Kong, where he founded the Longma Film Company along with fellow Shanghai emigrant Fei Mu.

Between 1930 and 1964, he directed 80 films. Two of his films, Sorrows of the Forbidden City (1948) and Festival Moon (1953) were ranked in the Hong Kong Film Awards' Best 100 Chinese Motion Pictures.
