= Xinhua Film Company =

Chinese film company

The Xinhua or New China Film Company (simplified Chinese: 新华影业公司; traditional Chinese: 新華影業公司; pinyin: Xīnhuà Yǐngyè Gōngsī), was one of the film studios to capitalize on the popularity of the leftist film movement in 1930s Shanghai, that had begun with the Mingxing and Lianhua studios. It is not related to the modern-day Xinhua News Agency. The production company lasted from 1934 until 1942, when it was absorbed into a Japanese-controlled conglomerate, Zhonglian.

== Business history ==
Xinhua was founded and controlled by Shankun Zhang (张善琨), who had previously worked in the Peking opera scene. By 1934, Zhang had made enough money to create his own movie studio named "Xinhua" or "New China." Zhang proved to be an excellent promoter, and within three years, Xinhua had transformed from a minor newcomer to a major industry player. After the Battle of Shanghai in 1937, Xinhua remained the only major production company still active in what became known as the "Solitary Island (zh)" period of Chinese film (in that the foreign concessions of Shanghai were an "island" within the "sea" of Japanese occupation). It was eventually joined by two major competitors, Guohua Film Company (established from the remnants of Mingxing, whose studio had been destroyed by Japanese bombing) and Yan Chuntang's Yihua Film Company, which had closed after the occupation but reopened in May 1938.

In 1938, the film company was split into two subsidiaries, Huacheng and Huaxin because of a franchise agreement with distributors. In 1939, Zhang incorporated Xinhua into an American owned company named Zhongguo lianhe or "China United Pictures" (not to be confused with "United China", a common translation of the unrelated Lianhua Film Company or "China United Productions, Ltd., Xinhua's eventual successor). This was done mainly to escape from Japanese meddling of Xinhua business. As a result of Zhang's business dealings, Xinhua managed to produce twenty-four films in 1939 alone, making it the largest production company in Shanghai. By 1942, however, Xinhua was folded into the Japanese-controlled Zhongguo lianhe zhipian gufen gongsi (China United Productions Ltd. or Zhonglian for short); the result of a Japanese orchestrated merger between Xinhua and eleven other Shanghai studios under Japanese film producer Kawakita Nagamasa. Zhang Shankun's cooperation in this venture would eventually lead to his arrest by Chinese nationalist forces near the end of the war, ironically occurring shortly after he was arrested by the Japanese for suspicion of divided loyalty. Zhang would eventually move to Hong Kong after being freed by the Nationalists after the war.

== Important Xinhua productions ==
- Song at Midnight (1936), dir. Ma-Xu Weibang
- Diao Chan (1938), dir. Bu Wancang
- Mulan Joins the Army (1939), dir. Bu Wancang
- Family (1941), dir. Bu Wancang, Li Pingqian, et al.

== See also ==
- Cinema of China
- List of Chinese production companies (pre-PRC)
