= Ruan Lingyu =

Chinese silent film actress (1910-1935)

- 阮玲玉
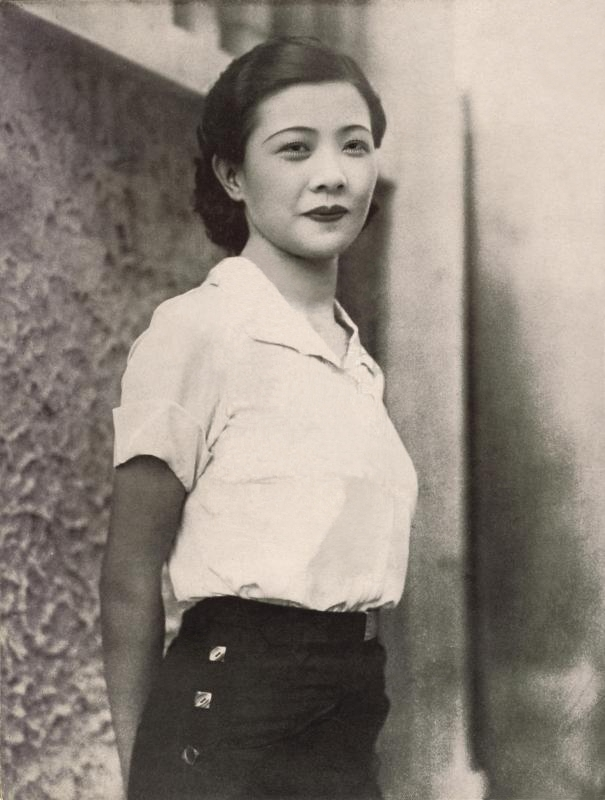
- Ruan in 1935
- Born: Ruan Fenggen (阮鳳根); April 26, 1910; Shanghai, Qing China
- Died: March 8, 1935 (aged 24); Shanghai, Republic of China
- Cause of death: Suicide by barbiturate overdose
- Other name: Lily Yuen
- Occupation: Actress
- Years active: 1927–1935

Chinese name
- Traditional Chinese: 阮玲玉
- Simplified Chinese: 阮玲玉
Transcriptions
Standard Mandarin
- Hanyu Pinyin: Ruǎn Língyù
Yue: Cantonese
- Jyutping: Jyun^{2} Ling^{4}juk^{6}

Alternative Chinese name
- Traditional Chinese: 阮鳳根
- Simplified Chinese: 阮凤根
Transcriptions
Standard Mandarin
- Hanyu Pinyin: Ruǎn Fènggēn
Yue: Cantonese
- Jyutping: Jyun^{2} Fung^{6}gan^{1}

Ruan Ling-yu (Chinese: 阮玲玉; pinyin: Ruǎn Língyù, born Ruan Feng-gen [阮鳳根; Ruǎn Fènggēn]; April 26, 1910 – March 8, 1935), also known by her English name Lily Yuen, was a Chinese actress in silent films. One of the most prominent Chinese film stars of the 1930s, her exceptional acting ability and suicide at the age of 24 led her to become an icon of Chinese cinema.

== Early life ==
Ruan was born to a working class family in Shanghai, and her ancestral home is in Xiangshan, Guangdong. Her father died when she was young, and her mother brought her up working as a housemaid.

== Career ==
=== Early acting career ===
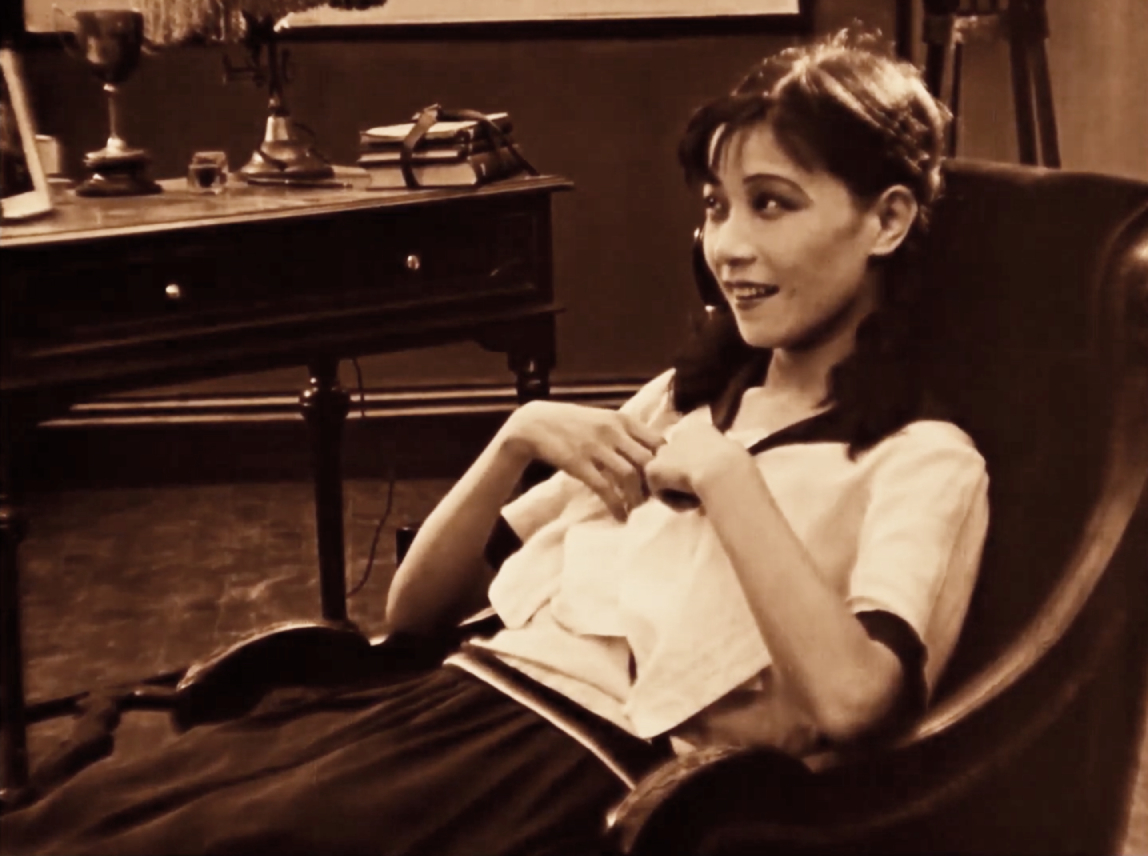
20-year-old Ruan in Love and Duty

In 1926, to help make ends meet, Ruan signed up for the prominent Mingxing Film Company. She made her first film at the age of 16. The film, A Married Couple in Name Only (掛名的夫妻/挂名的夫妻), was directed by Bu Wancang.

Two years later, she was signed by Da Zhonghua Baihe Company (大中華百合公司/大中华百合公司), where she shot six films. Her first big break came in Spring Dream of an Old Capital (故都春夢 or Reminiscences of Beijing, 1930), which was a massive hit in China. It was Ruan's first major work after signing with the newly formed Lianhua Studio in 1930. In it, she played a prostitute by the name of Yanyan.

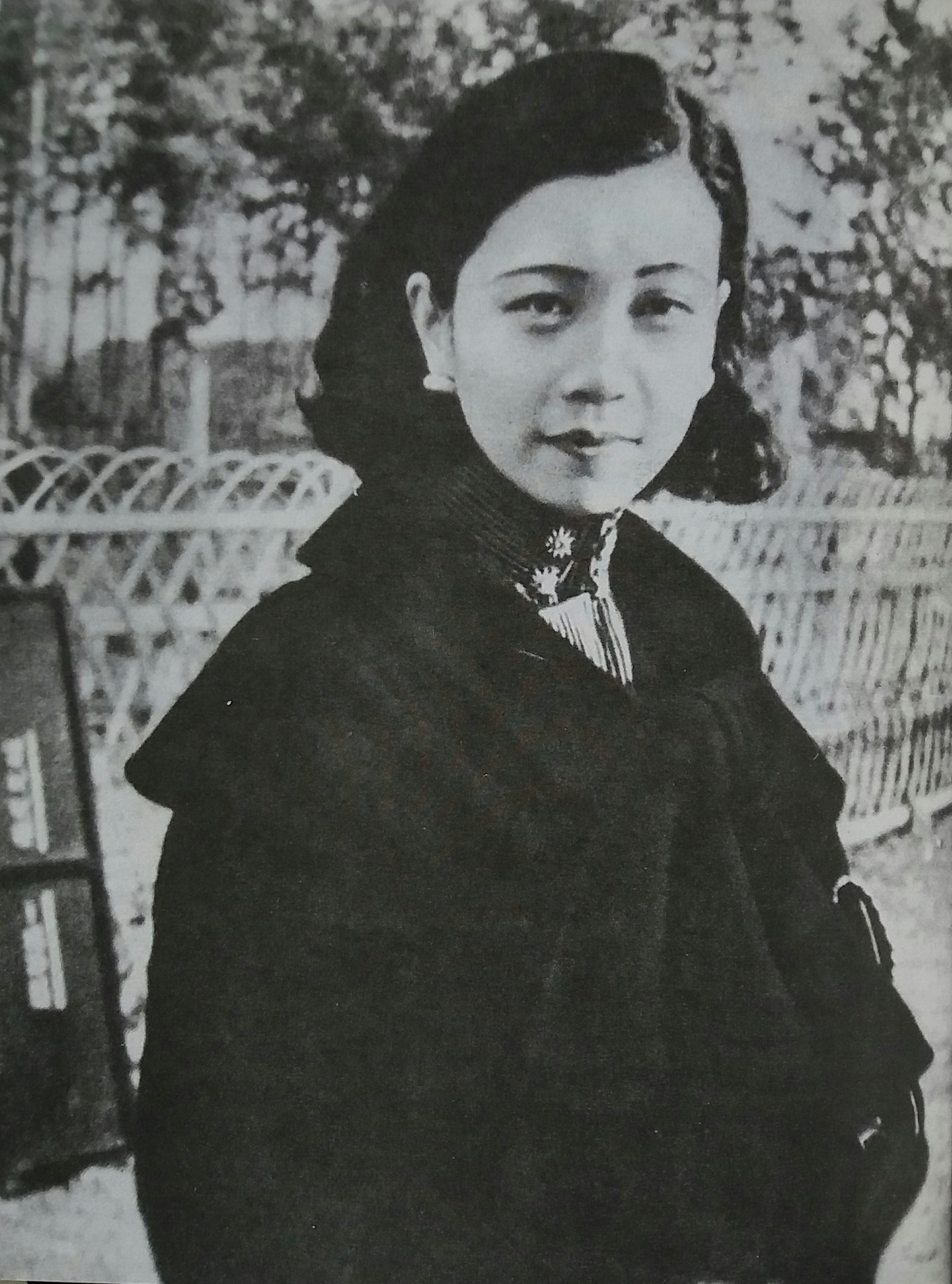
Ruan in 1930s

=== Breakthrough and important films ===
Thereafter, Ruan became Lianhua's major film star. Her most memorable works came after 1931, starting with the melodrama Love and Duty (directed by Bu Wancang). Ruan had by then gained popularity owing to a string of leading roles, and in 1933 she was voted second runner-up in a poll held by Star Daily (明星日報) for China's "movie queen". (Hu Die emerged the winner and Chen Yumei was first runner-up). Beginning with Three Modern Women (1932), Ruan started collaborating with a group of leftist Chinese directors.

In Little Toys (1933), a film by Sun Yu, Ruan played a long-suffering toy-maker. Her next film, The Goddess (1934; dir: Wu Yonggang), is often hailed as the pinnacle of Chinese silent cinema; Ruan sympathetically portrayed a prostitute bringing up a child. Later that year, Ruan made her penultimate film, New Women (directed by Cai Chusheng), in which she played an educated woman forced to death by an unfeeling society. The film was based on the life of actress Ai Xia, who killed herself in 1934. Her final film, National Customs, was released shortly after her death.

One of Ruan's earliest films, Love and Duty (1931), directed by Bu Wancang and long believed to be a lost film, was discovered in Uruguay in 1994.

== Personal life ==
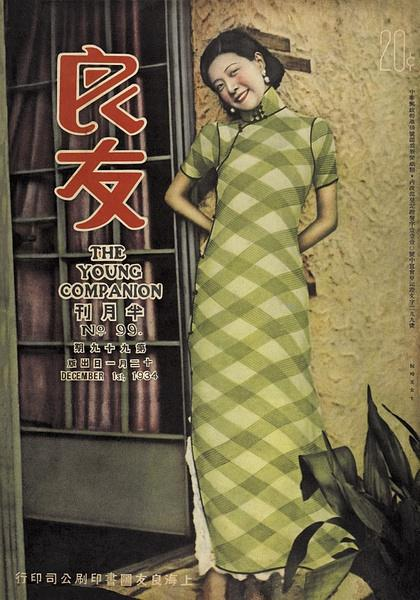
Ruan on the cover of The Young Companion pictorial, December 1934

At the age of 16, Ruan became acquainted with Zhang Damin (张达民/張達民), whose family her mother worked for. Zhang was later driven out of his wealthy family due to his spendthrift ways and became a chronic gambler, supported by Ruan's salary. Unable to tolerate Zhang's gambling, Ruan split with him in 1933.

She then began living with Tang Jishan, a tea tycoon. In 1935, Zhang filed a lawsuit asking for reparations from Ruan. The tabloids seized on this opportunity to probe into Ruan's private life and put her under intense pressure.

Following the completion of New Women, Ruan's life began to unravel. The film opened in Shanghai in 1935. Cai Chusheng was under massive pressure from tabloid reporters, who were extremely hostile, owing to the scathing depiction of the Shanghai tabloids in the movie. Cai was forced to make extensive cuts to the film. Even after that, Ruan's private life was mercilessly seized upon by the tabloids and her lawsuit with her first husband, Zhang Damin, became a source of vindictive coverage.

=== Death ===
Faced with her various public issues and intense private problems, Ruan committed suicide in Shanghai on March 8, 1935, at the age of 24, by taking an overdose of barbiturates. Her suicide note apparently contained a line which says "gossip is a fearful thing" (人言可畏), although recent researchers have doubted the note's authenticity as it appears to have been forged by Tang Jishan. Even China's preeminent intellectual Lu Xun was appalled at the details surrounding Ruan's death and wrote an essay entitled "Gossip is a Fearful Thing", denouncing the tabloids.

Recent researchers believe her deteriorating relationship with Tang Jishan and Zhang Damin's lawsuit were the cause of Ruan's death. It was further intensified by the mob media of China after New Women was released, since the film depicted the life of actress Ai Xia, who committed suicide due to media rumors about her private life. Ruan is also believed to have been physically abused on the evening that she died.

=== Funeral services and subsequent tributes ===
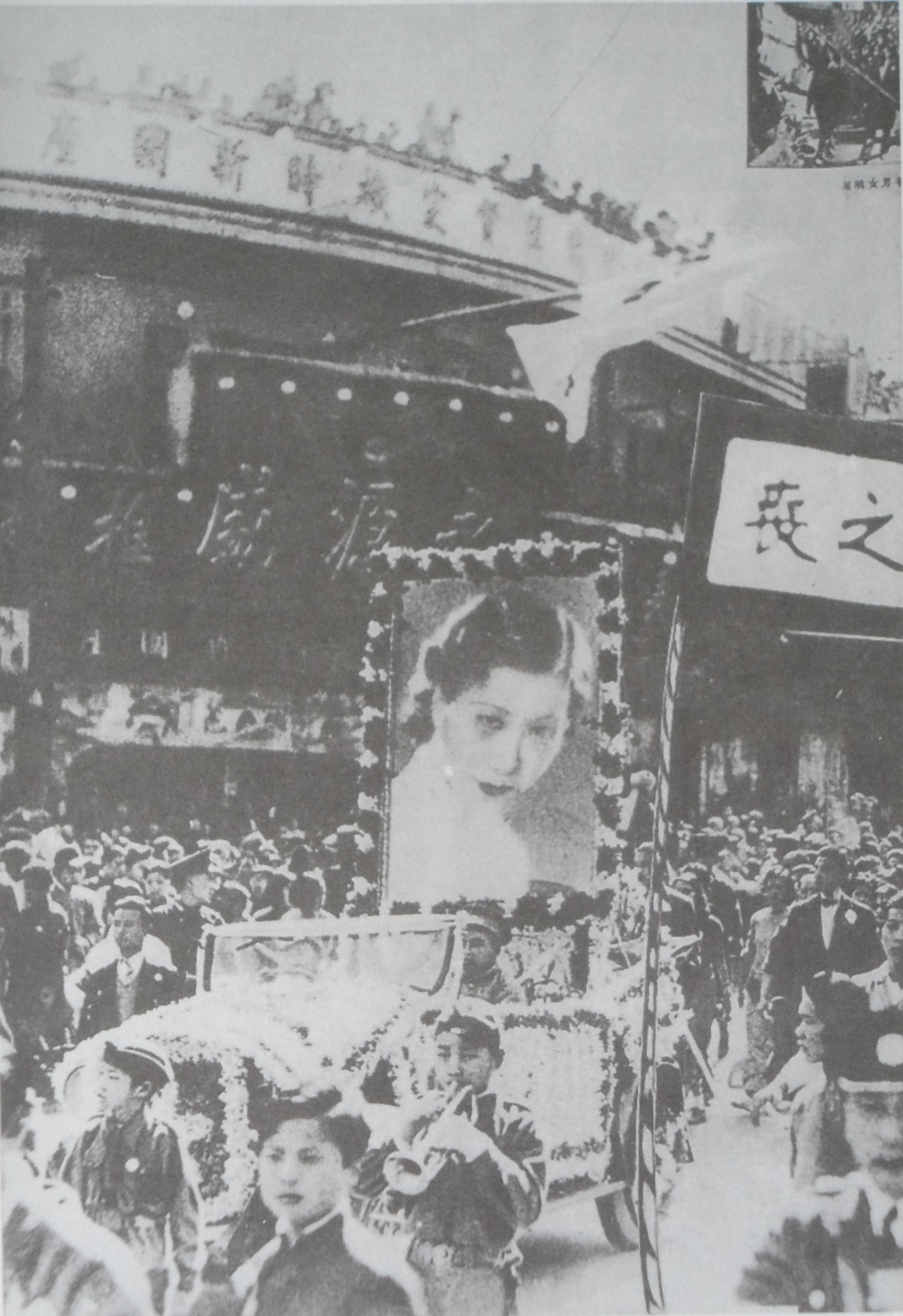
Ruan's funeral procession was reportedly attended by more than 100,000 people.

Her funeral service at the Wanguo Funeral Home lasted for three days. Several well-known film actors and actress attended her funeral, including Wang Renmei, Lin Chuchu and Liang Saizhen, and her pallbearers included some of the leading film directors such as Lai Man-Wai, Fei Mu, Wu Yonggang and Cai Chusheng. After the service, Ruan's casket was taken to a cemetery in Zhabei district.

Her funeral procession was reportedly 3 miles (4.8 km) long, with three women committing suicide during the event. The New York Times called it "the most spectacular funeral of the century".

In 1998, a uniquely designed monument dedicated to her debuted in Fushouyuan Cemetery in Shanghai.

== Suicide notes and alleged forgery ==
Two sets of suicide notes existed that were purportedly written by Ruan Lingyu just before her death.

=== First version ===
The earlier suicide notes were first published in Lianhua Pictorial (聯華畫報) on April 1, 1935, in a commemorative issue on Ruan Lingyu's death, supplied by Tang Jishan with whom Ruan Lingyu was cohabiting at the time of her death.

These suicide notes are now believed to have been forged by Tang Jishan, as Ruan Lingyu was unlikely to have written a letter to the press over her suicide, furthermore with lines like "[my spirit] will watch over you forever and ever" to Tang Jishan.

LETTER TO THE PUBLIC

Once I die, people will surely think I did it [killed herself] out of guilt. But what crime have I committed, that I must feel guilty about? Because I never did Zhang Damin any wrong, not in any way. We shan’t talk about anything else, just this: I even gave him 100 yuan a month after we separated and started living apart.

I'm not making this up, I have proof and the receipts. But he repaid gratitude with revenge, gave resentment for kindness. Moreover, the outside world doesn't know this, he made them think I did him wrong.

So what else can I come up with? I gave it so much thought—only suicide can end it all.

Alas, it's no pity if I die. But gossip is a fearful thing. I'm still afraid people will talk, that's all.

—Ruan Lingyu, last words. Midnight, March 7, 1924.

I can't prove my innocence unless I die. Now that I am dead, he can have his way. Although he didn't kill me himself, I have died because of him. Zhang Damin, let's see how you can escape public censure! You can't set Tang Jishan up now, since you have already driven me to my death!

TO TANG JISHAN, WRITTEN AT MIDNIGHT

Jishan: I never expected death to be separating us so soon. But don't be sad. Every banquet has to end in this world someday. Please don't keep grieving.

I'm really sorry, I let you suffer because of me. Although he did all he could to slander us, things will come to light one day. Justice has its net spread wide and no one can escape. Let's see how that man lives now.

Just before a bird dies, its cry will be plaintive. Just before a person dies, he or she will speak kind words. If my spirit still exists after my death, it will watch over you forever and ever. After I die, please use what remains of my wages to support my mother and Nannan [Ruan Lingyu's adopted daughter]. If the money is not enough, please help! And please be watchful all the time, make sure that my aged mother won't do what I am about to do. I really ask this of you.

If you truly love me, please don't let me down by ignoring my instructions. I have said enough, we shall meet again in our next lives if fate allows it! Please collect my wage arrears from the company and support Mom and Nannan with the money. That's 2,050 yuan in all. This is so important. And that other letter—please publish it in the papers if the outside world comes to know I have killed myself. If they don't know, please don't tell the public.

—Lingyu. Last words. Midnight, March 7, 1924.

=== Second version ===
On April 26, 1935, the Siming Journal of Business (《思明商學報》) published what are now believed to be the real suicide notes of Ruan Lingyu. As the Siming Journal was a journal with an internal circulation of just 1,500 copies, few in China read about this and the article was largely forgotten after its initial publication.

The editor of Siming Journal claimed that Tang Jishan got Liang Saishan (梁賽珊), the sister of his lover Liang Saizhen (梁賽珍), to forge Ruan Lingyu's handwriting and suicide notes, which were then published in Lianhua Pictorial. Pricked by their conscience, Liang Saishan and Liang Saizhen later supplied Siming Journal with Ruan Lingyu's real suicide notes.

The notes were allegedly carelessly written, with many characters stricken off and rewritten, reflecting Ruan Lingyu’s state of mind. Most researchers believe them to be the authentic suicide notes left behind by Ruan.

The suicide notes were republished by Professor Lian Wenguang (连文光) in his 1993 book, Chinese and International Cinemas: History and Anecdotes. Public interest reignited after Shanghai's Xinmin Evening News reported the research of film historian Shen Ji (沈寂) in 2001, which coincided with Lian Wenguang’s findings.

Suicide note 1:

Damin: You drove me to my death, but who will believe that? Think about how I gave you 100 yuan each month after we separated. You have no conscience at all. People will surely think I did this out of guilt? But what crime have I committed, that I must feel guilty about? I only deeply regret being a trophy fought over by the two of you. But it's too late now! You don't have to cry! I'll be dead! You don't have to repent either, since it has already come to this.

Suicide note 2:

Jishan: If you weren't infatuated with XXX [left blank upon publication, allegedly Tang Jishan’s other lover, Liang Saizhen 梁賽珍], if you hadn't hit me that evening and again this evening, I probably wouldn't be doing this! After I die, people will surely call you a demon and on top of that, call me a soulless woman. But by then, I'll be gone from this world. You can suffer alone!

Zhiyun in the past [Tang Jishan’s former actress girlfriend 張織雲], me today—I'm sure you know who it will be tomorrow. When I'm dead, I won't dare to hate you. I hope you will treat Mom and little Nannan [Ruan Lingyu’s adopted daughter] well.

And Lianhua owes me wage arrears of 2,050 yuan. Please use the money to take care of them. And please look after them attentively, since they can only depend on you!

Without me, you can do what you like. I'm very happy.

== Portrayal in popular culture ==
=== Films ===
Zhang Damin, who tried to tell his story regarding Ruan's suicide (and profit financially), agreed in 1935 to star as himself in a film titled Tears of Love (情淚). The film was aborted following angry backlash. Zhang did not give up, however. In 1937, a Hong Kong film titled Who's to Blame? (誰之過) directed by Shum Kat-sing (沈吉誠) appeared, starring Zhang as himself and Tam Yuk Lan (譚玉蘭) as Ruan; this may have been the same film as Tears of Love. In 1938, Zhang starred in yet another Hong Kong film, Wife of a Friend (朋友之妻), written and directed by Mak Tai-fung (麥大豐). This film did not invoke Ruan's name, but the reference cannot be more obvious: according to a handbill, the film told about an immoral womanizer who abandons his own wife to seduce his friend's, with the friend's wife committing suicide in the end. Neither film appears to have survived, and Zhang died from an illness later in 1938 in Hong Kong, apparently penniless.

In 1991, Hong Kong director Stanley Kwan made a movie about her life, Center Stage, starring Maggie Cheung as Ruan. Cheung won the Berlin Film Festival Silver Bear for Best Actress. Zhang Damin and Tang Jishan are portrayed by Lawrence Ng and Chin Han respectively. The film is credited to have revived public interest in Ruan Lingyu and her films.

=== TV series ===
In 1985, Cecilia Wong (黃杏秀) played Ruan in a 20-episode TV series aired on Asia Television, titled Ruan Lingyu/The Stardust Memories.

In 2005, Jacklyn Wu Chien-lien played Ruan in a 30-episode Chinese TV series, also titled Ruan Lingyu.

Kong Lingjie (孔令洁) played Ruan Lingyu in the 1996 Chinese TV series Movie Queen Butterfly (影后胡蝶).

Ruan Lingyu's name was discussed throughout the HK TVB series - The 'W' Files (衛斯理) in 2003; however, there was no character portrayal. It was fitting to mention her name in the series since the plot was set in Shanghai during the 1930s, and she was a notable figure during that time.

Comics

Ruan Lingyu was a character in the Assassin’s Creed: Templars (also simply known as Templars) comics, written by Fred Van Lente and illustrated by Dennis Calero; it was published by Titan comics and ran from March 2016 - January 2017.

== Filmography ==
Year	English title	Original title	Role	Notes
1927	A Married Couple in Name Only	掛名的夫妻	Shi Miaowen	Lost
1927	The Tablet of Blood and Tears	血淚碑	Liang Sibao	Lost
1927	Yang Kwei Fei of Peking	北京楊貴妃	Yang Xiaoyue	Lost
1927	The Heart of Women	婦人心		Lost
1928	The Luoyang Bridge	蔡狀元建造洛陽橋	Wang Yongxu	Lost
1928	The White Cloud Pagoda	白雲塔	Pu Lüji	Lost
1929	The Pearl Crown	珍珠冠		Lost
1929	Warnings for the Lovers	情欲寶鑑		Lost
1929	Lonely Swan After the Calamity	劫後孤鴻		Lost
1929	Attacking Nine-Dragon Mountain	大破九龍山		Lost
1929	Burning Nine-Dragon Mountain	火燒九龍山		Lost
1929	The Flower of the Silver Screen	銀幕之花		Lost
1930	Dream of the Ancient Capital	故都春夢		Lost
1930	Suicide Contract	自殺合同		Lost
1930	Wild Flowers by the Road	野草閒花	Lilian	Lost?
1931	Love and Duty	戀愛與義務	Yang Naifan; Huang Guanying	
1931	A Spray of Plum Blossoms	一剪梅	Hu Zhilu (Julia)	
1931	The Peach Girl	桃花泣血記	Miss Lim	
1931	Yu Tang Chun	玉堂春		Lost
1932	Another Dream of the Ancient Capital	續故都春夢		Lost
1933	Three Modern Women	三个摩登女性	Zhou Shuzhen	Lost
1933	Night in the City	城市之夜	Daughter	Lost
1933	Little Toys	小玩意	Sister Ye	
1934	Life	人生		Lost
1934	Coming Home	歸來		Surviving reels are unedited
1934	Goodbye, Shanghai	再會吧，上海		Partially survived, missing 3 reels
1934	A Sea of Fragrant Snow	香雪海		Lost
1934	The Goddess	神女	Prostitute	
1935	New Women	新女性	Wei Ming	
1935	National Customs	國風	Zhang Lan	

== See also ==
- Cinema of China
- Jin Yan
- Zhou Xuan

== Bibliography ==
- Richard J. Meyer (2005). Ruan Ling-Yu: The Goddess of Shanghai. Hong Kong University Press. ISBN 962-209-395-7.
