= Lai Man-Wai =

Chinese actor and director (1893–1953)

Lai Man-wai
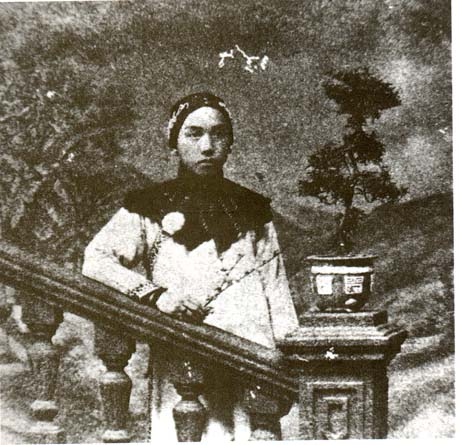
- Lai in 1913 in Zhuangzi Tests His Wife
- Born: 25 September 1893; Yokohama, Japan
- Died: 26 October 1953 (aged 60); Hong Kong
- Occupation: Film director
- Known for: Father of Hong Kong Cinema
- Spouses: Yan Xianxian; Lim Cho-cho
- Children: Lai Hang (1928-1965); Lai Suen (b.1931)
- Relatives: Lai Cheuk-cheuk (niece); Gigi Lai (grand-daughter)

Chinese name
- Traditional Chinese: 黎民偉
- Simplified Chinese: 黎民伟
Transcriptions

Lai Man-wai (Chinese: 黎民偉; pinyin: Li Minwei; September 25, 1893 – October 26, 1953), also romanised as Lay Min-wei or M.W. Ray, considered the "Father of Hong Kong Cinema", was the director of the first Hong Kong film Zhuangzi Tests His Wife in 1913. In the film, Lai played the role of the wife, partly due to the reluctance of women to participate in show business at the time.

Born in Yokohama, Japan, of Xinhui, Guangdong origin and raised in Hong Kong, he joined Sun Yat-sen's Kuomintang party in 1911 and helped make anti-warlord movies.

== Biography ==
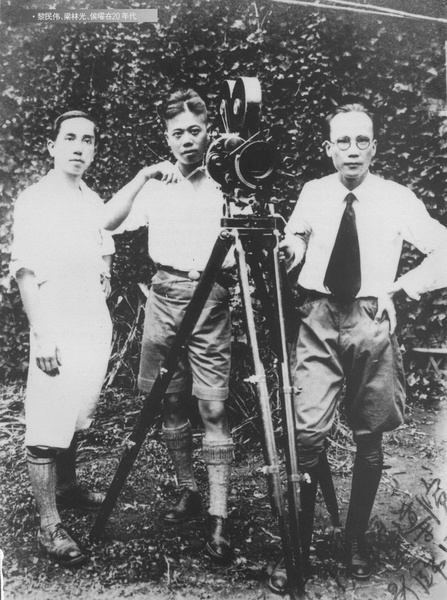
Lai Man-Wai (left), with photographer Liang Linguang (middle) and director Hou Yao (right), in the 1920s

Lai was born in 1893 in Yokohama, Japan to Chinese parents. He grew up in Hong Kong. Liu's earliest exposure to cinema was watching a newsreel from the Russo-Japanese War.

In 1913, Lai founded a drama troupe in Hong Kong. He collaborated with Ukrainian-American filmmaker Benjamin Brodsky in the production of two short fiction films.

Lai was a member of Sun Yat-sen's Revolutionary Alliance.

In 1921, Lai founded a film exhibition company. In 1922, he founded the production company Minxin. Because Lai believed that cinema in China should serve the country's revolution and modernization, Minxin's early productions focused on documentaries dealing with educational, current affairs, and cultural topics. In 1925, Lai relocated Minxin from Hong Kong to Shanghai.

Sun Yat-sen and the Kuomintang became a major focus of Minxin's films. Lai recorded Sun's public announcement of the Northern Expedition, and documented Chiang Kai-shek's consolidation of power after Sun's death, including filming the progress of the Northern Expedition. Initially, Minxin released film from this period as news reels. Later, Lai compiled footage into an eighty-minute film which the KMT branch in Shanghai approved as the only long format film for party propaganda, making the film one of the earliest party films in China.

Prior to Chiang's anti-communist purge, Lai maintained strong political relationships with both anti-communists and communists. He continued working across the political spectrum thereafter.

In 1930, he co-founded one of the "Big Three" studios of the 1930s, Lianhua Film Company, with Lo Ming-yau. Lianhua, together with other leading Shanghai studios, was destroyed when the Empire of Japan attacked Shanghai in 1937. Lai returned to Hong Kong in 1938 and retired.

He was married to Lim Cho-cho, a Canada-born actress. His daughter Lai Suen and granddaughter Gigi Lai are both actresses.

== Memory ==
His story was documented in Lai Man-wai: Father of Hong Kong Cinema by Choi Kai-kwong in 2001.

Lai Man-wai is portrayed in Stanley Kwan's 1991 biopic of actress Ruan Lingyu, Center Stage, by Hong Kong actor, Waise Lee.

== Partial filmography ==
- Zhuangzi Tests His Wife (1913)
- Romance of the Western Chamber (1927) – Directed with Hou Yao
- The Desert Island (1936) – Producer
- The Battle of Shanghai (1937)
- A Page of History (1941) – Documentary. Lai Man-wai followed Sun Yat-sen during the 1920s.
