= United Photoplay Service =

Chinese film production company

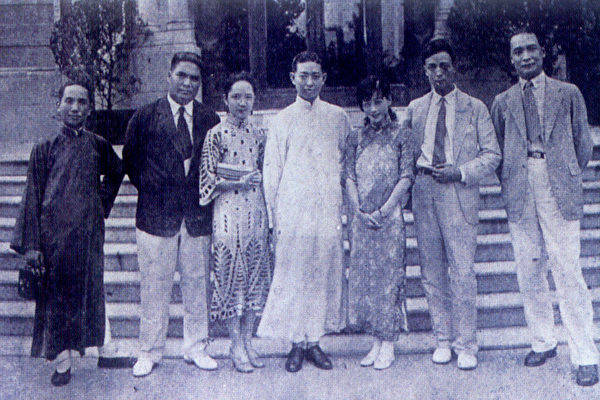
Key people of United Photoplay Service (left to right): Lai Man-Wai, Lo Ming Yau, Lim Cho Cho, Mei Lanfang, Ruan Lingyu, Sun Yu, and Jeffrey Y.C. Huang (黃漪磋).

The United Photoplay Service Company (traditional Chinese: 聯華影業公司; simplified Chinese: 联华影业公司; pinyin: Liánhuá yǐngyè gōngsī; lit. 'United China Film Company') was one of the three dominant production companies based in Shanghai, China during the 1930s, the other two being the Mingxing Film Company and the Tianyi Film Company, the forerunner of the Hong Kong–based Shaw Brothers Studio.

== Names ==
The original name of the company was Lianhua Productions. It is also known by a large number of translated names, notably China Film Company, United China Film Company and United Photoplay Service. The full name of the limited company later on was called "Lianhua Film Production and Processing Company, Ltd."

== History ==
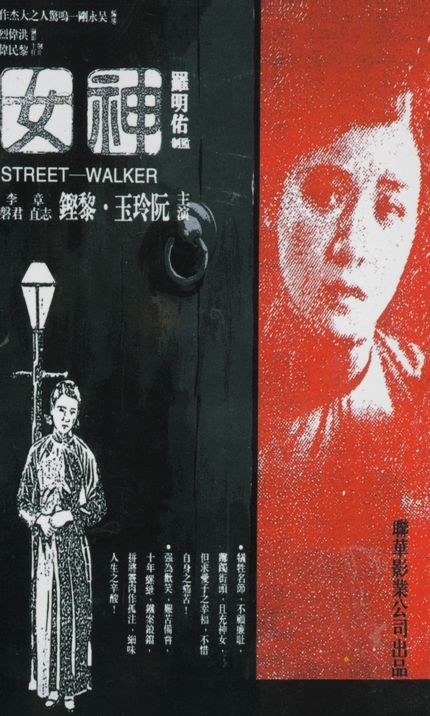
One of Lianhua's most famous films, The Goddess (1934)

Lianhua was formally registered in March 1930 in Hong Kong by Luo Mingyou (Law Ming-yau) and his partner, director Li Minwei (Lai Man-Wai). In order to resist the invasion of American films that dominated the box office in Shanghai and other cities, Luo realized he would have to produce films that were equally attractive artistically and equally rigorous in the business of production and distribution. The Company put advertisements in movie trade journals that proclaimed it was a modern company that aimed to create a Chinese Hollywood. Luo's plan was to build studios in Beijing, Shanghai and Hong Kong, to open a school to give up to date training for both technicians and actors, and to integrate the management of all these elements into a vertical organization on the Hollywood model.

In 1931, the entire enterprise transferred operations to the bustling city of Shanghai. That same year the Bright Moonlight Song and Dance Troupe, founded by Li Jinhui, would integrate with the film company. It is the first time a Chinese popular music group of any sort becomes part of the movie industry. The company would later prove to be instrumental in the rise of the first generation of shidaiqu music. Among the company's leading stars were the actresses Wang Renmei, Li Lili, and Chen Yen-yen, who appeared in many box office successes.

The studio itself consisted of four branches studios: China Sun (which was also founded by Li Minwei), Dazhonghua Baihe, Shanghai Yingxi, and Xianggong Yingye; all four had been independent studios during the 1920s before being co-opted by Luo in the early 1930s.

By the mid-1930s, however, Lianhua's fortunes had declined, as the war with the Japanese took its toll on both the company and the city. Japanese bombardment destroyed numerous Lianhua holdings including its Studio No. 4, and soon the company was losing money with each film produced. By 1936, Luo had left Lianhua's management, and Li Minwei had reformed Minxin as an independent studio using Lianhua's Studio No. 1. When the Nationalist forces withdrew from Shanghai in late 1937, it signaled the final collapse of the company. By the end of the war, Lianhua had generally been supplanted by other film companies, notably the Xinhua Film Company.

With the end of the war, several of Lianhua's directors returned to Shanghai from Chongqing, Hong Kong, and other cities. Most notably was Cai Chusheng, who returned in 1946 and set about to revive the Lianhua name. Thus, the Lianhua Film Society was formed. Eventually, this new Lianhua would turn into the Kunlun Film Company (崑崙影片公司), which would go on to produce many of the most significant films of the 1940s, including The Spring River Flows East (Dir. Cai Chusheng, Zheng Junli, 1947), and Crows and Sparrows (Dir. Zheng Junli 1949).

== Notable films ==
Like its competition, Lianhua employed directors who were part of the leftist film movement, and while in existence, produced and premiered many of the most significant films of the period; these included:

- Two Stars in the Milky Way (dir. Shi Dongshan, 1931)
- Love and Duty (Dir. Bu Wancang, 1932)
- Wild Rose (Dir. Sun Yu 1932)
- Night in the City (Dir. Fei Mu, 1933)
- The Big Road (Dir. Sun Yu, 1934)
- The Goddess (Dir. Wu Yonggang, 1934)
- Song of the Fishermen (Dir. Cai Chusheng, 1934)
- New Women (Dir. Cai Chusheng, 1935)
- Song of China (Dir. Fei Mu, Luo Mingyou 1935)
- Blood on Wolf Mountain (Dir. Fei Mu, 1936)
- Lianhua Symphony (anthology, 1937)

== Talent ==
Lianhua, like other early studios had an in-house talent pool of directors, actors, actresses, and screenwriters. Many, in fact, had been talent under contract with one of the four branch studios while they were still independent (such as Ruan Lingyu who was with Dazhonghua Baihe). The following is an incomplete list of such talent.

=== Directors ===
- Bu Wancang
- Cai Chusheng
- Fei Mu
- He Mengfu
- Shen Fu
- Shi Dongshan
- Situ Huimin
- Sun Yu
- Tan Youliu
- Wu Yonggang
- Zhu Shilin

=== Actors and Actresses ===
- Jiang Qing
- Li Lili
- Ruan Lingyu
- Mei Lin
- Jin Yan
- Zheng Junli

== See also ==
- Cinema of China
- List of Chinese Production Companies (Pre-Communist)

== Bibliography ==
- Fu, Poshek (2003), Between Shanghai and Hong Kong: The Politics of Chinese Cinemas, Stanford University Press, ISBN 0-8047-4518-8
- Pang, Laikwan (2002), Building a New China in Cinema: The Chinese Left-Wing Cinema Movement, 1932-1937, Rowman & Littlefield Publishers, Inc., ISBN 0-7425-0946-X
- Rea, Christopher (2021), Chinese Film Classics, 1922-1949, Columbia University Press, ISBN 9780231188135
