= Romance of the Western Chamber (TV series) =

Chinese historical romantic comedy

- Traditional Chinese: 西廂記
- Simplified Chinese: 西厢记
- Hanyu Pinyin: Xīxiāngjì
- Genre: Historical, romantic comedy
- Based on: Romance of the Western Chamber
- Written by: Chen Baohua
- Directed by: Lu Qi
- Starring: Zhou Qiqi; Zhang Xiaochen; Deng Jiajia
- Country of origin: China
- Original language: Mandarin
- No. of seasons: 1
- No. of episodes: 30

Production
- Executive producer: Li Xiaoming
- Production location: Furong Garden
- Production company: China International Television Corporation

Original release
- Network: CCTV-8
- Release: January 30 – February 7, 2013

Romance of the Western Chamber (Chinese: 西厢记) is a 2013 Chinese historical romantic comedy directed by Lu Qi and written by Chen Baohua. It stars Zhou Qiqi, Zhang Xiaochen and Deng Jiajia. The TV series is an adaptation of Wang Shifu's work of the same name.

== Cast ==
=== Main ===
- Zhou Qiqi as Cui Yingying, the daughter of the Prime Minister
- Zhang Xiaochen as Zhang Gong, the young scholar.
- Deng Jiajia as Hongniang, a servant of Ying Ying

=== Supporting ===
- Song Jia as Mrs. Cui, Yingying's mother
- Sun Jian as Zheng Heng
- Qi Ji as Du Que
- Wang Huichun as Zheng Deze
- Shi Dasheng as Cui Yu, the Prime Minister, father of Yingying
- Ma Xiaowei as monk Huiming
- Ma Jingwu as the Emperor
- Wang Ji as the Empress
- Zheng Siren as the son of the Emperor
- Fu Jia as Sun Feihu

== Production ==
Most of the film was shot on locations in Datang Furong Garden, Small Wild Goose Pagoda, Xingqing Park, and Heyang.

== Music ==
No.	Title	Lyrics	Music	Singers	Length
1.	"A Sight of You (看了你一眼)" (Opening theme)	Ji Chuchen	Xu Xiangrong	Ding Wei and Yong De
