= Romance of the Western Chamber (disambiguation) =

Romance of the Western Chamber is a late 13th-century/early 14th-century Chinese play by Wang Shifu. It may also refer to:

- Romance of the Western Chamber (film), a 1927 Chinese film based on the play
- Romance of the Western Chamber (TV series), a 2013 Chinese TV series based on the play
