= Pu Shunqing =

Chinese screenwriter and actress

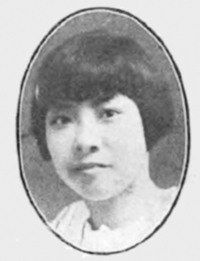
- Born: 1902; Yuhang, Zhejiang, China
- Died: Unknown
- Spouse: Hou Yao

Pu Shunqing (Chinese: 濮舜卿; 1902 – ?) was a Chinese screenwriter, playwright, assistant director, and actress. A feminist writer and champion of women's liberation, she is considered the first female screenwriter in China. Her husband Hou Yao was also a Chinese film pioneer and advocate for gender equality, and the couple influenced each other's style.

== Life and career ==
Pu Shunqing attended Southeast University in Nanjing, Jiangsu Province, majoring in political economy. At the university she formed the "Southeast Drama Society" with her classmate, and later, husband Hou Yao. She wrote the well-known three-act play, Paradise on Earth, which adds a female character named "Wisdom" to the plot of the Book of Genesis. Wisdom prods Eve to eat the apple and build a paradise on earth. Pu called for women's liberation through the mouth of Wisdom, who declares that "if you don't believe in God, he will disappear."

In 1924, Pu starred in the film The World Against Her directed by Hou; this was their first collaboration. She wrote the screenplay for Cupid's Puppets in 1925, making her the first Chinese female screenwriter; it was made into a film that same year. Playwright Hong Shen noted that Pu and her husband mutually influenced each other's style and moralism. Both Pu and Hou were concerned with stories that focused on women, and Pu likely had an influence on her husband's advocacy of women's rights.

Pu, along with her husband, joined the China Sun Motion Picture Company in 1926. She helped Hou edit the film God of Peace in that year. In 1927, she served as the assistant director and scriptwriter for the film Way Down West. Paradise on Earth, a collection of her plays, was published in 1928. She would write the scripts for Cai Gongshi and Mulan Joins the Army before the China Sun Motion Picture Company would go bankrupt. She also wrote the screenplays Hibiscus Tears and Her New Life, but they were never made into films. Pu's film career ended when China Sun was acquired by the Lianhua Film Company in 1930.

She was labeled as a May Fourth playwright since she was heavily influenced by the movement.

In the late 1930s, she became a lawyer based in Tianjin and had her own legal advice column in the newspaper Shen Bao. After World War II she ran for congress but did not win.

== Personal life ==
She married her schoolmate, director Hou Yao in 1926. Hou later moved to Hong Kong and became de facto married to his assistant scriptwriter Wan Hoi-ling, but probably never formally divorced Pu. He was killed by the Japanese in Singapore, during the Sook Ching massacre of 1942.

== Filmography ==
as Screenwriter and Assistant Director

- Way Down West (1927)

as Screenwriter

- Cupid's Puppets (1925)
- Hibiscus Tears (1926)
- Her New Life (1927)
- Divorcee Comedies (1927)
- Cai Gongshi (1928)
- Mulan Joins the Army (1928)

as Actress

- The World Against Her (1924)

== Theatrical works ==
- The Plaything of the Goddess of Love
- Paradise on Earth (1928)

== See also ==
- Cinema of China
