= Deng Jiajia =

Chinese actress

- 邓家佳
- Born: Deng Jia (邓嘉); 17 May 1983 (age 43); Neijiang, Sichuan, China
- Education: Communication University of China (BLitt)
- Occupation: Actress
- Years active: 2001–present
- Spouse: Yu Yan (m. 2009–2019)

Chinese name
- Traditional Chinese: 鄧家佳
- Simplified Chinese: 邓家佳
Transcriptions
Standard Mandarin
- Hanyu Pinyin: Dèng Jiājiā

Deng Jiajia (Chinese: 邓家佳; born 17 May 1983) is a Chinese actress.

Deng is noted for playing Tang Youyou in the sitcom television series IPartment, which enjoyed the highest ratings in China when it was broadcast.

== Early life ==
Deng was born in a military family in Neijiang, Sichuan on May 17, 1983. Her father is good at singing and dancing, thus inspiring Deng from an early age to be a star. At the age of four, Deng sang and danced on the Spring Festival evening party of Neijiang city. Deng started learning using electronic organ by age six. Deng became the student in charge of entertainment in her class during her school-days.

Deng began her career by attending the reality show Holiday Story (假日总动员) when she was a senior high school student, she won the championship.

Deng received a Bachelor of Literature with a major in performing arts from the Communication University of China in 2005.

== Acting career ==
Deng began her career by appearing in small roles in several wuxia television series, such as Ode to Gallantry, Chinese Paladin and The Legend of Chu Liuxiang.

In 2011, Deng rose to fame for her role in IPartment 2, which was one of the most watched ones in mainland China in that year. Deng also filmed in a number of successful sequels to IPartment.

In 2013, Deng starred in Silent Witness, a crime thriller film; and received critical acclaim for her performance. She won the Best Supporting Actress awards at the Hundred Flowers Awards and Golden Rooster Awards.

In 2018, Deng starred in the critically acclaimed crime drama Burning Ice.

In 2019, Deng starred in the historical drama Empress of the Ming, portraying Hu Shanxiang. For her role as Hu Shanxiang, she was nominated as a Best Actress in a Supporting role for the 2020 Magnolia Awards.

== Filmography ==
=== Film ===
| Year | English title | Chinese title | Role | Notes/Ref. |
|---|---|---|---|---|
| 2007 | | 除却巫山 | Yun | |
| 2008 | | 飓风之舞 | Xiaoyu | |
| 2008 | Almost Perfect | 十全九美 | Nangong Yan | |
| 2009 | The Message | 风声 | | Cameo |
| 2009 | Visitors From The Sui Dynasty | 隋朝来客 | Zhu Xiaoxiao | |
| 2009 | Panda Express | 熊猫大侠 | A Hao | |
| 2010 | The Double Life | A面B面 | Dongfang Ying | |
| 2010 | Don Quixote | 魔侠传之堂吉诃德 | | Cameo |
| 2011 | I Phone You | 爱封了 | | Cameo |
| 2012 | Any Other Side | 夜店诡谈 | Xiaolu | |
| 2012 | The Story of Shanghai | 上海故事 | Fang Yao | |
| 2012 | Double Trouble | 宝岛双雄 | Jing Wen | |
| 2013 | Seven Days Before the Break Up | 分手前那7天 | Yo Yo | |
| 2013 | Mysterious Island 2 | 孤岛惊魂2 | Zhou Qing/ Zhou Xi | |
| 2013 | Sweet Summer Love | 夏日示爱 | Su Jialin | |
| 2013 | Silent Witness | 全民目击 | Lin Mengmeng | |
| 2016 | Lost in White | 冰河追凶 | Wuxue | |
| 2016 | Foolish Plan | 槑计划 | An Jing | |
| 2018 | Chosen | 杀无赦 | Tao Lu | |
| 2018 | Love Apartment | 爱情公寓 | Tang Youyou | |
| 2021 | Be Somebody | 扬名立万 | Su Mengdie | |
| 2024 | To Gather Around | 胜券在握 | Fangfang | |
| TBA | God of Practice | 遇神 | | |

=== Television series ===
| Year | English title | Chinese title | Role | Notes/Ref. |
|---|---|---|---|---|
| 2002 | Ode to Gallantry | 侠客行 | Shi Jian | |
| 2005 | Chinese Paladin | 仙剑奇侠传 | Du'niangzi | |
| 2007 | The Legend of Chu Liuxiang | 楚留香传奇 | Zhangsun Hong/ Yun Zhu | |
| 2008 | | 敌营十八年 | Luo Maoli | |
| 2009 | Go Around the World | 闯荡 | Mao Yanyan | |
| 2009 | Four Women Conflict | 锁清秋 | Kuang Chunni | |
| 2010 | Romance of the Western Chamber | 西厢记 | Hongniang | |
| 2010 | Infernal Lover | 无间有爱 | Hua'er | |
| 2011 | iPartment 2 | 爱情公寓2 | Tang Youyou | |
| 2011 | Family Property | 家产 | Li Muzi | |
| 2012 | IPartment 3 | 爱情公寓3 | Tang Youyou | |
| 2013 | | 狂奔的左左 | Zuo Zuo | |
| 2013 | Romantic Kitchen | 浪漫满厨 | Shui Ruobing | |
| 2013 | Liao Zhai New Compilation | 聊斋四 | Yun Lei | |
| 2014 | iPartment 4 | 爱情公寓4 | Tang Youyou | |
| 2014 | Where is Happiness | 幸福在哪里 | Mi Duo | |
| 2014 | Winter Flowers | 冬暖花会开 | Lan Suxin | |
| 2015 | Think Before You Marry | 想明白了再结婚 | Man Yi | |
| 2016 | Edge of Happiness | 缘来幸福 | Su Xiaoxiao | |
| 2016 | Fury Hero | 怒火英雄 | Guan Shuang | |
| 2017 | Burning Ice | 无证之罪 | Zhu Huiru | |
| 2017 | With Elite | 我不是精英 | Wei Jing | |
| 2019 | Empress of the Ming | 大明风华 | Hu Shanxiang | |
| 2020 | My Dearest | 最亲最爱的人 | Zhen Jie | |
| 2020 | Hunting | 猎狐 | Yu Xiaohui | |
| 2021 | New Generation: Bomb Disposal Expert | 我们的新时代 | Bai Yan | |
| 2022 | | 回廊亭 | Jiang Yuanxing | |
| 2022 | Babe | 通天塔 | Cui Shan | |
| 2022 | | 致勇敢的你 | An Yu | |
| 2023 | | 灿烂的转身 | An Ning | |
| 2024 | Frozen Surface | 黑土无言 | Wang Ping | |
| TBA | Love Express | 爱情也包邮 | Lin Xiaohe | |
| TBA | Player | 玩家 | Zhou Zhishu | |
| TBA | Hui Lang Ting | 回廊亭 | Jiang Yuanxing | |
| TBA | Babel | 通天塔 | Cui Shan | |

== Awards and nominations ==
| Year | Event | Category | Nominated work | Result | Ref. |
|---|---|---|---|---|---|
| 2020 | 26th Shanghai Television Festival | Best Supporting Actress | Empress of the Ming | Nominated | |
| 2020 | 7th The Actors of China Awards | Best Actress (Sapphire) | —N/a | Nominated | |
