= Romance of the Western Chamber (film) =

1927 film by Hou Yao

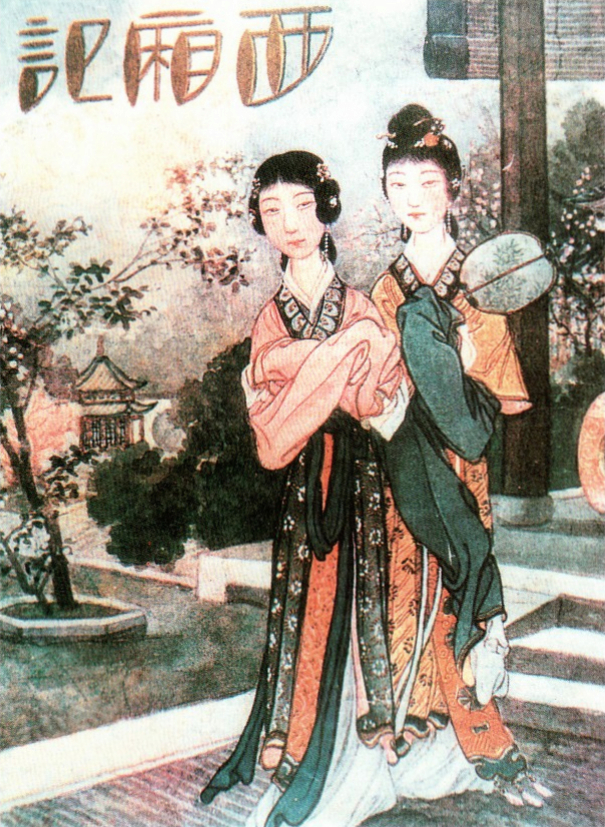
- 1927 Chinese movie poster
- Directed by: Hou Yao; Lai Man-Wai
- Written by: Hou Yao; Play: Wang Shifu
- Produced by: Lai Man-Wai
- Cinematography: Liang Linguang
- Production company: China Sun Motion Picture Company (Shanghai)
- Release dates: 8 September 1927 (Hangzhou Theater, China)
- Running time: 42 min. (orig.); 45 min. (2007 DVD release)
- Country: China
- Languages: Silent film Written Chinese and French intertitles

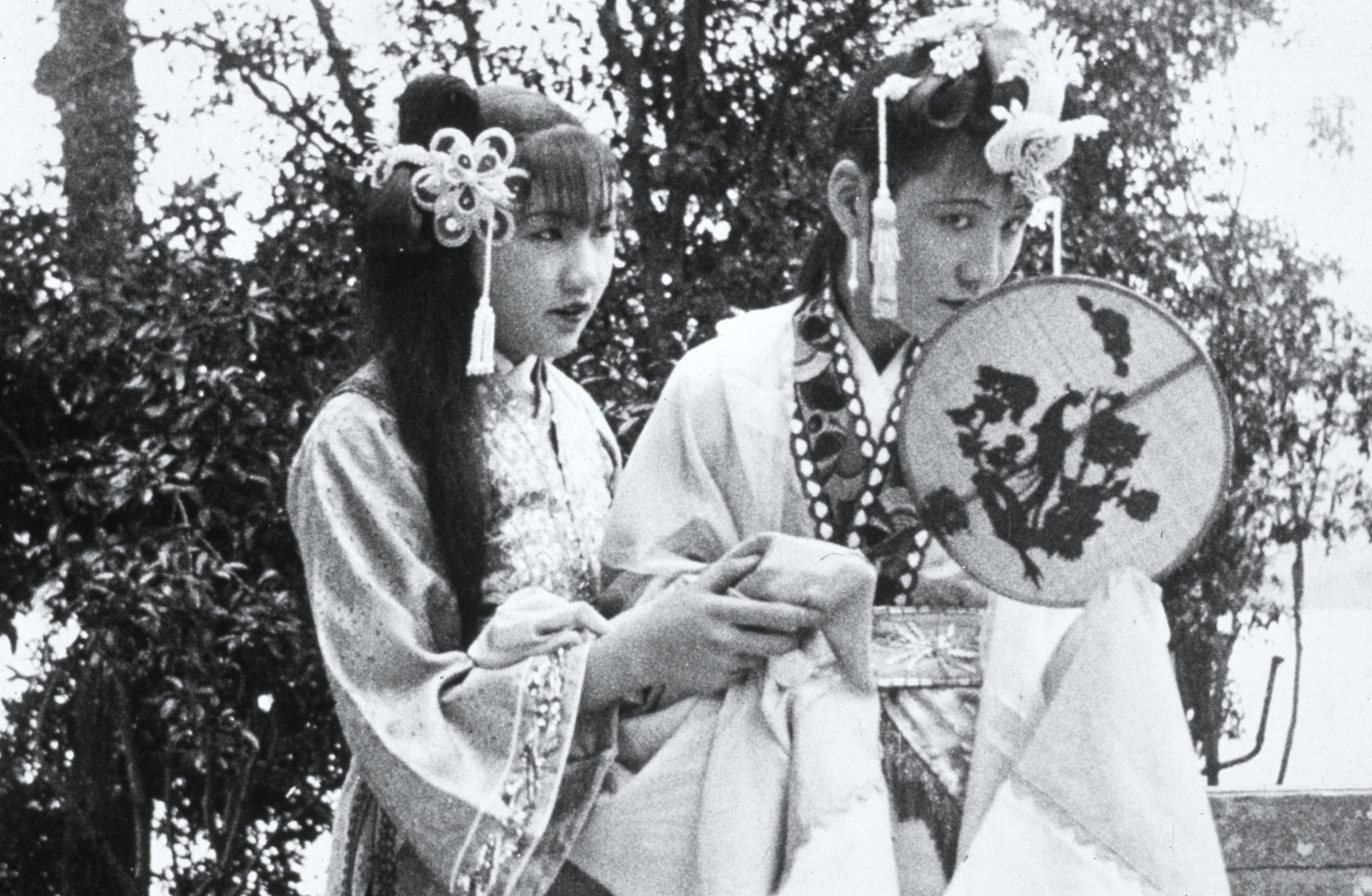
Scene from the film.

Romance of the Western Chamber (Chinese: 西廂記; pinyin: xīxiāngjì), also known as Way Down West, is a 1927 silent Chinese drama film directed by Hou Yao and Lai Man-Wai.

The film is an adaption of the classic Chinese dramatic work Romance of the Western Chamber by Wang Shifu.

Originally consisting of ten film reels, only five have survived.

The 2007 USA DVD release by Cinema Epoch has an additional original musical score composed by Toshiyuki Hiraoka.

== Cast ==
- Lim Cho Cho - as Cui Yingying, the daughter of the late Prime Minister
- Li Dandan - as Hongniang, the maidservant of yingying
- He Minzhuang (M. C. Noo) - as Madame Cui, the mother of Yingying
- T. K. Kar - as wise student Zhang Gong
- Tsao Yao Dein - as an old monk Fa Pen
- Lee Wha Ming/Li Huamin - as Sung Fei Fu (Tiger Sun), the bandit king
- Lu Ying Lang/Li Yinlan - as monk Wei Hing, the messenger with bō staff
- Wang Longxi - as clever monk
- Hu Chichang - as the White Horse General
- Zhu Yaoting - as the stupid monk
- Huang Ke - as the boy servant
