= Lee Ya-Ching =

Chinese Actress and Aviator

Lee Ya-Ching 李霞卿
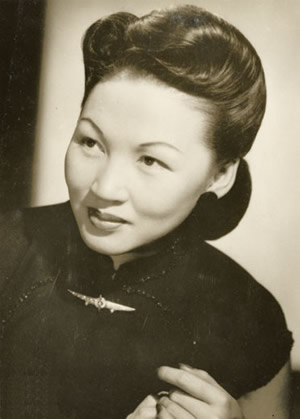
- Born: 16 April 1912; Haifeng County, Guangdong, China
- Died: 28 January 1998 (aged 85); Oakland, California, United States
- Known for: First Chinese civilian aviator; co-founder of first Chinese civilian flying school; actress
- Spouse: Paifong Robert Cheng aka Baifeng Zheng (1929-1935; divorced)

Lee Ya-Ching (Chinese: 李霞卿; pinyin: Lǐ Xiáqīng; 16 April 1912 – 28 January 1998), also known by her stage name Li Dandan (李旦旦), was a Chinese film actress, pioneering aviator, and philanthropist. She was the first Chinese woman to be granted a civil aviation license in China, in 1936, and also co-founded its first civilian flying school. As an actress, she starred in Romance of the Western Chamber, and played the lead in an early adaptation of Mulan for the screen. Lee Ya-Ching is an Anglicized version of her Chinese name.

== Aviator ==
At the age of sixteen, Li witnessed an airshow in Paris, which left a strong impression on her. In 1943, looking back on the start of her flying career, she explained that she had been troubled by Japanese aggression towards China and decided that she could best serve her country through flying. Li began training at the Contran École d'Aviation in Switzerland, where she was the first female student to receive a pilot's license.

In 1935, she enrolled in the Boeing School of Aviation in Oakland, California for advanced training. Later that year, she returned to China, where she was commissioned by the Chinese government to make a 30,000 mile survey of potential air routes. Li also helped found the Shanghai Municipal Air School and worked there as a flight instructor until civilian flights were grounded.

== Filmography ==
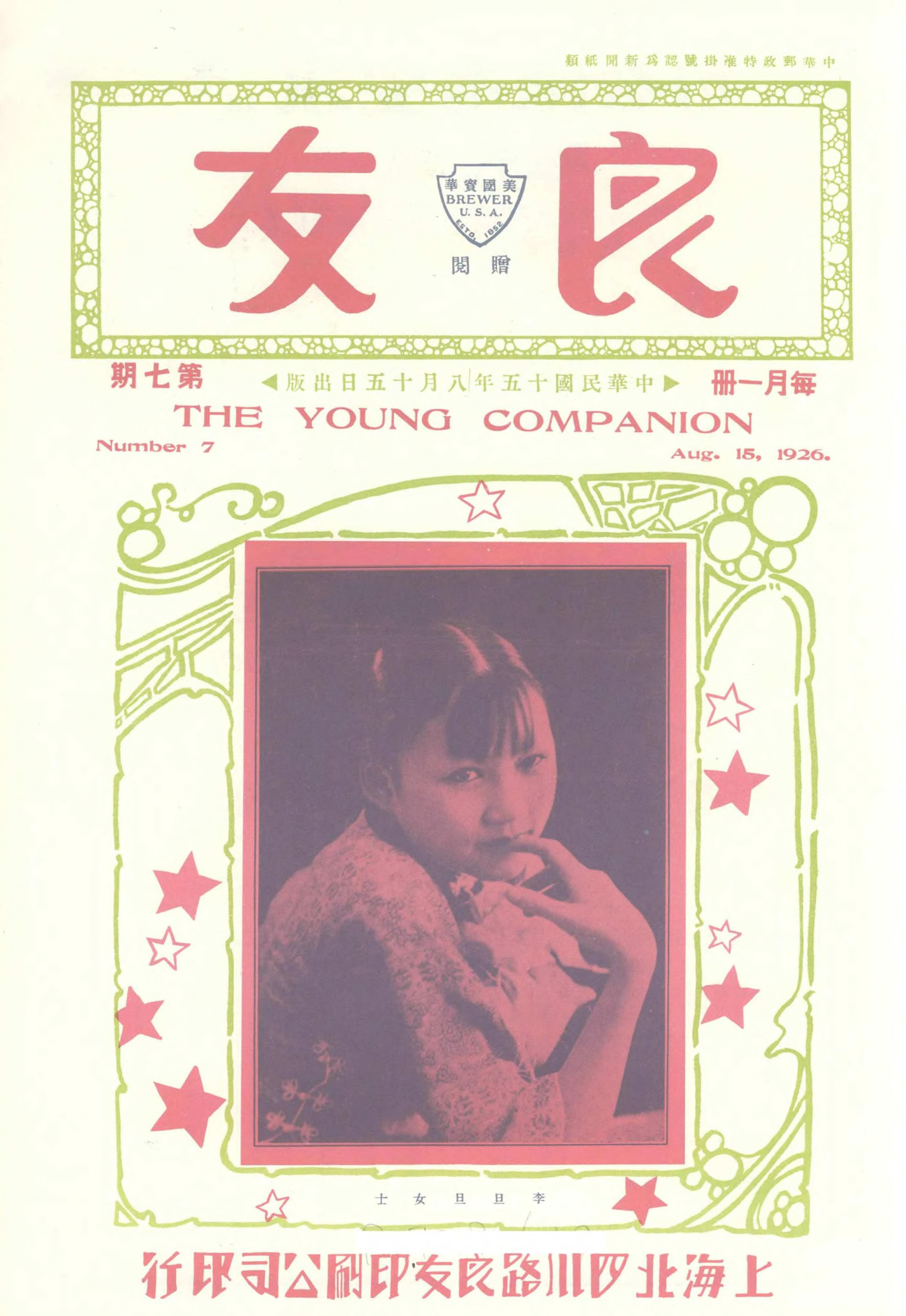
Cover of the Young Companion issue 7, 1926, featuring actress Li Dandan on the cover.

- The God of Peace (和平之神) (1926) - Lin Cuiwei
- Why Not Her (玉潔冰清) (1926) - Kong Qiongxian
- A Wandering Songstress (天涯歌女) (1927) - Li Lingxiao
- A Poet from the Sea (海角诗人) (1927) - Liu Tsan Ying
- Romance of the Western Chamber (西廂記) (1927) - Hongniang
- Five Avenging Women (五女復仇) (1928)
- Mulan Joins the Army (木蘭從軍) (1928) - Hua Mulan
- Don't Change Your Husband (情海重吻) (1929)
- Disputed Passage (1939) - Aviatrix (credited as Ya-Ching Lee)

== See also ==
- Fung Joe Guey
- Hazel Ying Lee
- Hilda Yen
- John Huang Xinrui
- Kwon Ki-ok
