= A Poet from the Sea =

1927 film

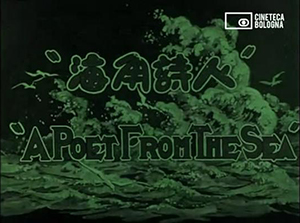
- Traditional Chinese: 海角詩人
- Simplified Chinese: 海角诗人
- Hanyu Pinyin: Hǎijiǎo Shīrén
- Jyutping: Hoi^{2}-gok^{3} Si^{1}-jan^{4}
- Directed by: Hou Yao
- Written by: Hou Yao
- Produced by: Y.S. Lee; Lai Man-Wai
- Starring: Hou Yao; Lee Dan Dan; Lim Cho Cho; Mi Tsong
- Cinematography: L.K. Liang
- Production company: China Sun Motion Picture Company
- Release date: 14 March 1927
- Running time: ~20 minutes (incomplete)
- Country: Republic of China
- Languages: Silent film, with Chinese and English intertitles

A Poet from the Sea is a 1927 Chinese silent film written and directed by Hou Yao, starring himself as a quixotic poet who tried to escape from the constraints of modernity. Filmed in Stanley, Hong Kong, it contains one of the earliest footages of Hong Kong. Like most Chinese silent films, it features both Chinese and English intertitles.

A fragment of the film was recovered in Europe and is currently stored in Italy's Cineteca di Bologna.

== Cast ==
- Hou Yao as Meng Ih Bing, a poet
- Lee Dan Dan as Liu Tsan Ying, a girl woodcutter
- S.D. Dju as Liu Yung, Liu Tsan Ying's younger brother
- Xing Banmei as Ms. Yang, Liu Tsan Ying's mother
- Lim Cho Cho as Yin Meizhen, Meng Ih Bing's cousin
- Mi Tsong as Ting Bung, Meng's neighbor and a farmer
- Sing Yee as Chang Tien Pao, a local bully
- S.M. Ying as Tsian Er, Chang Tien Pao's subordinate
- Huang Guanqun as Yang Yi, fisherman
- Ge Cihong as Shi Shaoqiu, a general's son
- Ou Xizhang as Guo Yongnian, a wealthy playboy
- Zhang Qilong as Wen Yuyuan, a journalist
- Xin Xin as Jin Dayou, a banker
