= Yingying's Biography =

Tang dynasty chuanqi tale

- Traditional Chinese: 鶯鶯傳
- Simplified Chinese: 莺莺传
Transcriptions
Standard Mandarin
- Hanyu Pinyin: Yīngyīng zhuàn
- Wade–Giles: Ying^{1}-ying^{1} chuan^{4}
- IPA: [íŋ.íŋ ʈʂwân]
Yue: Cantonese
- Yale Romanization: Āng'āng jyuhn
- Jyutping: Ang1-ang1 zyun6
- IPA: [ɐŋ˥.ɐŋ˥ tsyn˨]

A page from a printed copy of Yingying's Biography by Yuan Zhen

The Biography of Ying-ying (traditional Chinese: 鶯鶯傳; simplified Chinese: 莺莺传; pinyin: Yīngyīng zhuàn), also translated as The Tale of Yingying or The Story of Yingying, by Yuan Zhen, is a Tang dynasty chuanqi tale. It tells the story of a relationship conflicted between love and duty between a 16-year-old girl and a 21-year-old student. It is considered to be one of the most well-known works of fiction in Chinese literature.

== Role in history of Chinese literature ==
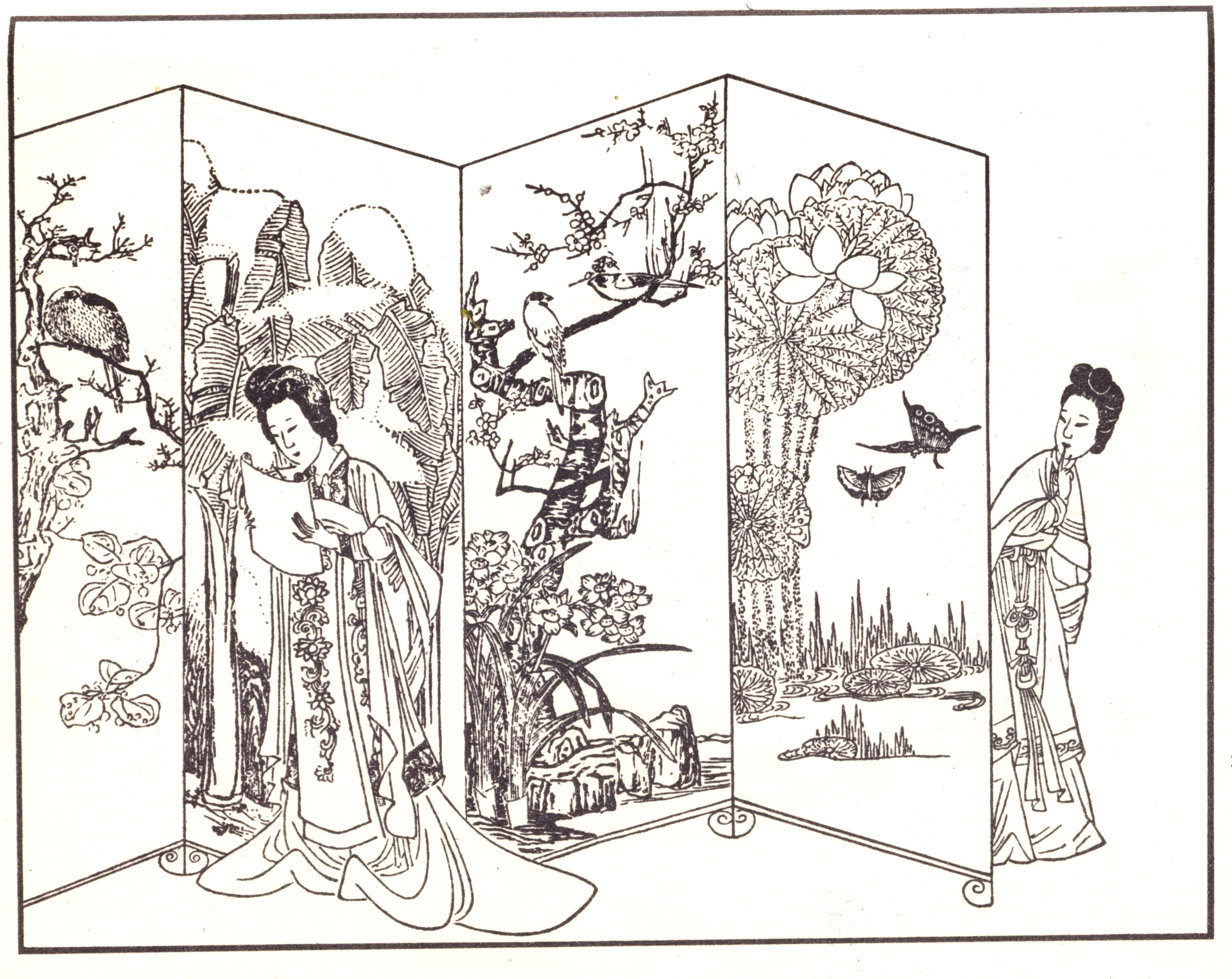
Scene from Romance of the Western Chamber, an opera inspired by the story of Yingying

Yuan Zhen pioneered psychological exploration and possibilities of plot development. His tale mixed narration, poetry and letters from one character to another to demonstrate emotion rather than describe it, making it in one sense an epistolary novel. The work was also innovative because its characters, in the terms suggested by E.M. Forster, are "round" rather than "flat", that is, unlike the characters in the earlier zhiguai or zhiren tales, are not built around a single idea or quality, but have the power to surprise readers. Recent critic Gu Mingdong suggests that with this tale, Chinese fiction "came of age", and the story provided themes for later plays, stories, and novels.

Yingying's Biography was one of three Tang dynasty works particularly influential in the development of the caizi-jiaren (scholar and beauty novels).

Among other works which it inspired was the Romance of the Western Chamber.

== Plot ==
During the Zhenyuan period of the Tang Dynasty there lived a young man called Zhang, who was handsome and gentle in nature with a remarkable sense of restraint. Whilst his peers behaved improperly with women, Zhang remained steadfast in his principles, claiming he had encountered no one so beautiful that they would tempt his resolve. By the time he reached his early 20's, Zhang was still a virgin.

When Zhang is living in a rented dwelling in a Buddhist compound, he becomes acquainted with Mrs. Cui, a widow who briefly stops at the compound on her way to the nearby city, Pu-zhou. Zhang and Mrs. Cui determine that Mrs. Cui, as well as her son and daughter, are distantly related to Zhang. Mrs. Cui and her entourage make their way to Pu-zhou, but find themselves in danger when the troops stage a mutiny, plunging the city into chaos. Zhang, having friendly connections with some influential men in the city, arranges a guard be posted at Mrs. Cui's lodgings. Because Zhang's actions ensured the safety of Mrs. Cui and her group, she holds a banquet to express her gratitude.

Mrs. Cui invites her children to thank Zhang for the kindness he has done for the family. The daughter, Cui Yingying, initially refuses, and only joins the family when her mother demands she pay her respects to the man who saved her life. Yingying appears deliberately unkempt and behaves in a most petulant and churlish manner, ignoring Zhang's attempts to engage her in conversation and taking leave as soon as the banquet concludes. Nevertheless, she appears gloriously beautiful to Zhang and he is infatuated, desperate to confess his love to Yingying. There is no indication whatsoever that he has loving parents, siblings, or anyone in his life who is more to him than a mere acquaintance. He is immediately infatuated with this young woman who is so different from the young women who entertained his companions in the capital.

Zhang cannot contact Yingying directly, so he confesses his feelings for her to her maid, Hongniang, who is alarmed by his admission and flees. When Zhang sees the maid again, he apologizes for his untoward behavior. Hongniang asks Zhang why he does not ask Mrs. Cui for her daughter's hand in marriage, reasoning that his offer would likely be accepted due to the protection he afforded the family in the past. Zhang says that he is so infatuated with Yingying that he could not withstand the amount of time the traditional matchmaking process required before he could be united with his wife. Zhang asks Hongniang how he might gain Yingying's favor. The maid advises that Yingying is extremely pious, but she has an affinity for poetry, so Zhang might write a love poem to seduce her. He arranges for Hongniang to deliver two "vernal" poems that the author of the story indicates would have conveyed no indecent propositions. Yingying responds with a poem that indicates romantic interest in "my lover", and invites him to come to her quarters after midnight. The student Zhang thinks that "his salvation [is] at hand", i.e., that he will at last find an end to the long dearth of affection in his life. However, when he keeps the appointment Yingying scolds him for his inappropriate messages and says that she lured Zhang here with the explicit purpose of telling him to cease his seduction attempts. Zhang is devastated.

Several nights later, Yingying visits Zhang without prior arrangement and initiates intercourse with him. She says not a single word to him from the time she arrives to the time she leaves the next day, at dawn. Zhang does not hear from Yingying for several days afterwards and he sends her another love poem detailing their encounter. It is only then that Yingying allows him to see her again, and before long they establish a routine in which Zhang sneaks into her dwelling each night, and sneaks back out at dawn. Despite her daughter entertaining a virile man every night, the Mrs. Cui does not intervene. When Zhang asks Yingying her mother's opinion on their affair, Yingying says that the Mrs. Cui wishes Zhang would formalize their relationship, but is aware there is nothing she can do about their current arrangement.

Another later printed edition

After some months, Zhang has to go to the capital to take the civil service examination that will determine whether he will be able to get a good job in the government. He reassures Yingying of his love for her, and Yingying is visibly devastated by Zhang's departure, but does not make her feelings known to him. Zhang does not pass the examination and returns to the Cui's compound, where he remains for several months.

Yingying had exceptional talent in calligraphy and wrote poetry, but would not share her talents with others. Even when Zhang wrote Yingying poetry, encouraging a response, she refused to engage. Yingying rarely expressed her emotions, rarely speaking to Zhang and maintaining an external impression of indifference. She had melancholic episodes, but it was nearly impossible to tell because she was so reserved. The only instance Yingying's despair was evident to Zhang was when he heard her playing a sad song on the harp, believing she was alone. She ceased playing as soon as Zhang made his presence known. This only heightened Zhang's affections for her.

Different translations present different descriptions of Yingying's behavior and demeanor. Some portray Yingying as dismissive and entitled, accepting Zhang's affections whilst refusing to engage with him in any meaningful way. Others portray Yingying as depressed and resigned, unable to express her feelings to Zhang without burdening him with her despair.

When Zhang has to leave for examinations once again, he does not tell Yingying of his departure nor his anguish that he must leave her. Nevertheless, Yingying senses his inner turmoil and, suspecting Zhang will not return to her this time, reassures him that he must feel no guilt or sorrow about abandoning her, as their improper relationship could only ever end in separation. To make him feel better, Yingying finally agrees fulfill Zhang's request that she play the harp for him. She begins to play "The Rainbow Robe and Feather Skirt" (also referred to as "Coats of Feathers, Rainbow Skirts" or "Rainbow Skirts and Feather Jackets"), but becomes so distraught that the song becomes unrecognizable and she eventually stops playing altogether, throwing down the harp and fleeing in tears. Zhang does not see Yingying again before he leaves the following morning.

Zhang fails the examinations again and must remain in the capital, so he sends gifts and a letter to Yingying to reassure her of his devotion. Yingying responds, thanking Zhang for the gifts and his continued affections and expressing that, while she understands it is in his best interest to remain in the capital, she cannot help but feel abandoned and describes how depressed she has been since his departure. Recounting the beginning of their affair, Yingying laments how she innocently believed that Zhang would one day legitimize the relationship. Now, she recognizes that the affair is why the relationship will never be legitimized, as Yingying has been defiled and is unsuited to be Zhang's wife. Yingying writes that marrying Zhang is her greatest wish, but she knows that his career and social standing are far too important to jeopardize by making an improper connection.

Yingying encloses several items which she claims symbolize her feelings and act as tokens of her love. She sends a jade bracelet for Zhang to wear, willing him to be firm and true like jade, and have a love unbroken as a bracelet. She also includes tangled thread to symbolize the mess of her unhappy thoughts and a tea grinder made of mottled bamboo whose pattern mimics the marks of her tears.

Yingying concludes that though she does not know when they will meet again, their love transcends the material forces that separate them. She bids that he take care of himself and not spend too much time pining over her.

Zhang shows Yingying's letter to a friend, Yang Ju-yuan, who writes a short poem about the tragic woman. Here, the author of the story, Yuan Zhen, inserts his own continuation of the unfinished verse Zhang wrote for Yingying following their first sexual encounter, called "Encounter with an Immortal" (also referred to as "Meeting the Holy One" or "Meeting a Fairy").

Yingying's passionate letter moved every one of Zhang's acquaintances who read it, but Zhang ultimately ended the affair. Author Yuan Zhen reports that when he asked Zhang why he did this, Zhang reasoned that beautiful women like Yingying were destined to destroy themselves or others. He claims that, had Yingying married a wealthy, powerful man, she could use her feminine charms to take advantage of his wealth and power, much like the wives of King Xin of Shang and King You of Zhou, whose influence over their husbands brought entire kingdoms to ruin. Zhang, recognizing his inability to resist Yingying's charm, resolved to end their relationship to ensure he would never be destroyed under her influence.

Years later, Yingying marries another man and Zhang, too, finds a wife. Whilst passing through the area of Yingying's new home, Zhang attempts to visit her. Yingying refuses to see him, and Zhang is visibly upset by her rejection. Hearing of his reaction, Yingying secretly sends Zhang a poem explaining that she refused him because she is embarrassed of how she looks, as she is no longer the beautiful young woman he fell in love with but a deeply depressed, haggard woman.

Later, as Zhang is about to leave the area, he receives a farewell poem from Yingying, in which she encourages him to turn any love he once held for her onto his new wife. Zhang never heard from Yingying again.

Zhang was praised by his peers and contemporaries of the time for rectifying the mistake he had made in starting an affair with Yingying by ending the relationship with her altogether.

== Translations ==
- James Hightower, "The Story of Yingying", in Minford, John; Lau, Joseph S. M., eds. (2000). Classical Chinese Literature: An Anthology of Translations I. From Antiquity to the Tang Dynasty. New York; Hong Kong: Columbia University Press; The Chinese University Press. ISBN 0231096763. pp. 1047–1057.
- Patrick Moran, "The Biography of Ying-ying — Enthrallment to Beauty, Destruction by Desire (includes Chinese text), .
- Owen, Stephen, "Yingying's Story", in Stephen Owen, ed. An Anthology of Chinese Literature: Beginnings to 1911. New York: W. W. Norton, 1997. p. 540-549 (Archive (Archive).
- Arthur Waley, "The Story of Ts'ui Yingying", More Translations From Chinese (1919) Sacred Texts (also in the Anthology of Chinese Literature by Cyril Birch, vol. I. (ISBN 0-8021-5038-1);
- "The Story of Cui Yingying" (Archive" (Archive), Indiana University.

== References and further reading ==
- Hightower, James (1973). "Yuan Chen and the 'Story of Yingying'". Harvard Journal of Asiatic Studies. 33: 90–123. doi:10.2307/2718886. JSTOR 2718886.
- Luo, Manling, "The Seduction Of Authenticity: 'The Story Of Yingying'." (Archive." (Archive). Nan Nü 7.1. Brill, Leiden, 2005. p. 40-70.
- Song, Geng (2004). The Fragile Scholar: Power and Masculinity in Chinese Culture. Hong Kong: Hong Kong University Press. ISBN 9622096204.
- Yu, Pauline. "The Story of Yingying" (Archive" (Archive). In: Yu, Pauline, Peter Bol, Stephen Owen, and Willard Peterson (editors). Ways with Words: Writing about Reading Texts from Early China (Volume 24 of Studies on China). University of California Press, 2000. ISBN 0520224663, 9780520224667. p. 182-185.
