= Be Somebody (2021 film) =

- Traditional Chinese: 揚名立萬
- Simplified Chinese: 扬名立万
- Hanyu Pinyin: Yángmínglìwàn
- Directed by: Liuxun Zimo
- Written by: Chen Si; Zhang Benyu; Ke Da; Liuxun Zimo
- Produced by: Han Han
- Starring: Yin Zheng; Deng Jiajia; Yu Entai; Yang Haoyu; Zhang Benyu; Ke Da
- Music by: Eunike Tanzil
- Production companies: Tianjin Maoyan Weiying Culture Media; Beijing Wanhe Tianyi Film and Television Culture Co., Ltd. PMF Pictures
- Distributed by: Tianjin Maoyan Weiying Culture Media; Beijing Wanhe Tianyi Film and Television Culture Co., Ltd. PMF Pictures
- Release date: 11 November 2021
- Running time: 123 minutes
- Country: China
- Language: Mandarin
- Box office: US$145.7 million

Be Somebody (Chinese: 扬名立万) is a 2021 Chinese comedy mystery film directed by Liuxun Zimo and produced by Han Han. The film stars Yin Zheng, Deng Jiajia, Yu Entai, Yang Haoyu, Zhang Benyu, and Ke Da. The film follows the story of a group of frustrated filmmakers who gather to plan on a new film about a notorious criminal case. The film premiered in China on 11 November 2021.

== Cast ==
- Yin Zheng as Li Jiahui
- Deng Jiajia as Su Mengdie
- Yu Entai as Zheng Qianli
- Yang Haoyu as Guan Jingnian
- Zhang Benyu as Qi Leshan
- Ke Da as Chen Xiaoda
- Chen Minghao as Lu Ziye
- Qin Xiaoxian as Da Hai
- Deng Enxi as Ye Ying
- Yu Ailei as Man in black
- Bai Ke as worker
- Winston Chao as boss

== Songs ==
No.	Title	Lyrics	Music	Singer(s)	Length
1.	"Lonely Blank (寂寞留白)" (Promotion song)			Pan Yun'an, Quan Qing, Zhe Qian
2.	"July, August and September (七八九月)" (Ending song)	Han Han	Akiyama Sayuri	Zhang Benyu

== Release ==
Be Somebody was released on 11 November 2021 in China.

=== Reception ===
Douban, a major Chinese media rating site, gave the drama 7.6 out of 10.

=== Box office ===
Be Somebody earned a total of ¥300 million ($46.93 million) in its first 9 days of release. On 27 November, it grossed more than ¥500 million ($78.22 million) at the box office. As of November 27, the film's accumulated grossed reached 500 million yuan ($78.22 million). As of January 30, 2022, the film has accumulated a gross of 927 million CNY ($145.7 million).
