= Nightclub School Hospital =

- Directed by: Fang Yaxi
- Written by: Fang Yaxi
- Starring: Chrissie Chau; Van Fan; Qi Yuwu; Deng Jiajia; Yida Huang
- Release date: February 10, 2012
- Running time: 86 minutes
- Country: China
- Language: Mandarin

Nightclub School Hospital, or Any Other Side, is a 2012 Chinese horror film.

== Plot ==
The story of the movie "Ghost Stories of the Nightclub" takes place in a bustling nightclub. The nightclub owner and staff, in an effort to attract more customers, decide to host an extraordinary party. On the night of the party, the nightclub is packed with a variety of people, and the atmosphere is lively. However, as the night progresses, a series of eerie events begin to unfold.

First, a customer mysteriously disappears in the restroom. Soon after, the club's lighting and sound equipment start malfunctioning, frightening everyone. The nightclub owner, along with key characters including a DJ played by Van Fan, a bartender played by Deng Jiajia, a mysterious guest played by Chrissie Chau, and a nightclub security guard played by Huang Yida, decide to investigate and uncover the truth behind these strange occurrences.

As their investigation deepens, they discover that the nightclub was previously an old theater, where a devastating fire occurred many years ago, resulting in numerous deaths. The spirits of the deceased may still be haunting the place, unable to find peace. Each character seems to have their own secrets and past, which gradually come to light, revealing their unusual connections to the nightclub.

Faced with a series of horrifying events and eerie phenomena, the characters must confront not just external horrors but their inner fears and guilt as well. They need to find a way to resolve these issues in order to escape this nightmare of a night.

"Ghost Stories of the Nightclub" delivers a heart-pounding viewing experience with its tense and thrilling plot development and chilling scenes. The film explores themes of human nature and fear, while also unveiling the dark side of modern urban life.

== Cast ==
- Chrissie Chau
- Van Fan
- Qi Yuwu
- Deng Jiajia
- Yida Huang
