= Hou Yao =

Chinese film director, screenwriter, and film theorist

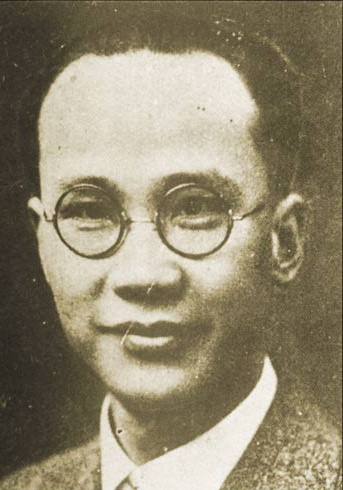
- Born: 1903; Panyu, Guangdong, Qing Empire
- Died: February 15, 1942 (aged 38–39); Japanese-occupied Singapore
- Education: Southeast University
- Spouses: Pu Shunqing; Wan Hoi-ling (尹海靈)

Chinese name
- Chinese: 侯曜
Transcriptions
Standard Mandarin
- Hanyu Pinyin: Hóu Yào

Hou Yao (1903–1942) was a pioneering Chinese film director, screenwriter, and film theorist. He wrote and directed many films including The Discarded Wife (1924), Romance of the Western Chamber (1927), the first Chinese film shown in Western countries, and Mulan Joins the Army (1928). He wrote Techniques of Writing Shadowplay Scripts, the first theory book on Chinese filmmaking. He founded the Culture Film Company, which was merged into a predecessor of the Shaw Brothers Studio. He has been called the Chinese Henrik Ibsen for his advocacy for gender equality, which he shared with his wife Pu Shunqing.

After the Empire of Japan invaded China in 1937, Hou Yao wrote and directed a series of patriotic films against Japanese aggression. In 1942, he was murdered by the Japanese during the Sook Ching massacre in Singapore.

== Biography ==
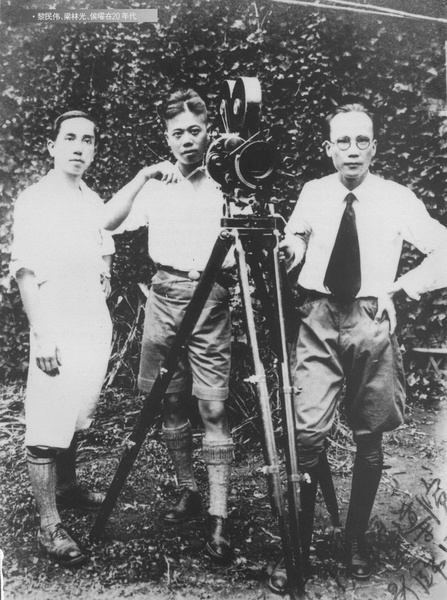
Hou Yao (right), with Li Minwei (left) and photographer Liang Linguang (middle), in the 1920s

Hou Yao was born in 1903 in Panyu, Guangdong province. In the 1920s, he attended Nanjing Advanced Normal School (now Southeast University) in Nanjing, Jiangsu province, majoring in education. He joined the influential Literary Association (文学研究会) at the school, and wrote the stage play The Discarded Wife.

After graduating in 1924, Hou joined the Great Wall Film Company in Shanghai, where he adapted The Discarded Wife into a film, which he co-directed with Li Zeyuan. It was Great Wall's first film. He then wrote the scripts for the films In the Dream of Loved Ones (1925) and The Star-Plucking Girl (1925), and directed Cupid's Dolls (1925, co-directed with Mei Xuechou) and The Hypocrite (1926). Each of his films of this period sought to reflect a social issue, such as women's rights, marriage, and war. Along with his wife Pu Shunqing, he was a strong advocate for gender equality, acknowledged as the Chinese Henrik Ibsen.

In 1925, Hou Yao published Techniques of Writing Shadowplay Scripts, the first theory book on Chinese filmmaking. In the same year, he joined the China Sun Motion Picture Company founded by Li Minwei. He directed Peace of God in 1926 and Romance of the Western Chamber in 1927. The latter was the first Chinese film shown in Western countries. He directed and starred in A Poet from the Sea (1927), a film that featured elaborate cinematography. In 1928 he directed Mulan Joins the Army.

Hou went to Tianjin in 1929 and worked as a teacher for a time. He then briefly worked for the Beijing branch of Li Minwei's Lianhua Film Company, where he produced Sad Song from an Old Palace in 1932. He later moved to Hong Kong, and established his own studio, Culture Film Company. In 1933, he made the film The Fool Pays Respects for Zhenye Film Company.

In 1937, the Second Sino-Japanese War erupted. The next year, Hou merged his Culture Company into the Nanyang Film Company, a predecessor of the Shaw Brothers Studio, and directed and wrote a number of "national defence" films against Japanese aggression, including Great Wall of Blood and Flesh (1938), The Last Minute Call (1938), and Storm Over the Pacific (1939). Storm Over the Pacific, adapted from a novel he wrote himself, envisioned the outbreak of the Pacific War and the defeat of the Empire of Japan by the United States and the Soviet Union.

In 1940, Hou moved to Singapore, where he continued to work for the Shaw Brothers. After the outbreak of the Pacific War in 1941, Japan defeated Britain and occupied Singapore. Because of his history of anti-Japanese activism, the Japanese murdered Hou Yao in 1942, at the beginning of the Sook Ching massacre.

== Legacy ==
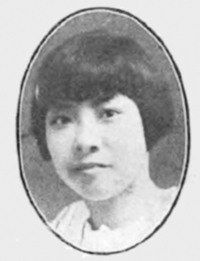
Pu Shunqing, Hou's first wife

Hou Yao is considered a pioneer of Chinese cinema, and his extant films and publications are critical for the study of early Chinese film history. A String of Pearls, a 1926 film he scripted, and Romance of the West Chamber were long thought to be lost, but rediscovered in the 1990s. A Poet from the Sea was rediscovered in Europe.

Hou Yao's assistant Fei Mu later became one of China's most celebrated directors.

== Personal life ==
Hou Yao married twice, and both his wives became women film pioneers. He was first married to Pu Shunqing, his schoolmate at Southeast University. A playwright and screenwriter who worked with Hou on many projects, Pu is considered China's first woman screenwriter. In the 1930s, he married his assistant scriptwriter Wan Hoi-ling (Chinese: 尹海靈), who became one of Hong Kong's first women directors, but probably never formally divorced Pu.

== Bibliography ==
- Bettinson, Gary (2015). Directory of World Cinema: CHINA 2. Bristol: Intellect Books. ISBN 978-1-78320-400-7.
- Rojas, Carlos; Chow, Eileen (2013). The Oxford Handbook of Chinese Cinemas. Oxford University Press. ISBN 978-0-19-976560-7.
- Wang, Lingzhen (2013). Chinese Women's Cinema: Transnational Contexts. Columbia University Press. ISBN 978-0-231-52744-6.
- Ye, Tan; Zhu, Yun (2012). Historical Dictionary of Chinese Cinema. Rowman & Littlefield. ISBN 978-0-8108-6779-6.
- Zhang, Yingjin (2012). A Companion to Chinese Cinema. John Wiley & Sons. ISBN 978-1-4443-3029-8.
