= Burning Ice =

- Burning Ice
- 无证之罪
- Genre: Crime, Drama, Thriller
- Based on: The Untouched Crime by Zijin Chen (紫金陈)
- Directed by: Xing LV
- Presented by: iQiyi
- Starring: Hao QIN, Jiajia DENG, Lu YAO, Xu DAI, Li NING
- Country of origin: People's Republic of China
- Original language: Chinese (Mandarin)
- No. of seasons: 1
- No. of episodes: 12

Production
- Executive producer: Sanping HAN
- Producers: Jiang BIAN, Kang QI
- Production companies: Beijing Thriving Pictures Co., Ltd., Eternity Pictures Corporation Limited, 529 Media Cooperation

Original release
- Release: September 6, 2017

Burning Ice (simplified Chinese: 无证之罪; traditional Chinese: 無證之罪) is a Chinese original crime drama television series, adapted from the novel The Untouched Crime by the author Zijin Chen (紫金陈), broadcast on iQiyi in September 2017.

== Series summary ==
Guo Yu, a member of a radicalized group called the "Ant Tribe," gets drawn into a homicide case involving his ex-girlfriend, Zhu Huiru. She's accused of murder, with evidence suggesting a link to a past serial killer known as The Snowman. Ex-cop Luo Wen, implicated in both cases, inadvertently aids Huiru and Yu by covering up evidence.

Crooked cop Yan Liang takes on the case to regain trust but faces a dilemma as his ex-partner, Luo Wen, is implicated. As Yu and Huiru race to clear their names, they encounter obstacles from both the real killer and a copycat. With tough choices ahead, including sacrificing each other to save themselves, their bond is tested.

Navigating the underworld, they uncover the truth but face limited options. As they confront the conclusion, sacrifices must be made for their survival.

== Characters ==
=== Yan Liang (Qin Hao) ===
Born into a family of detectives with a storied history, Liang was the typical mischievous teenager, at times forgetting who his family was, but always still able to fall into trouble. Under his father's aggressive guidance, and watchful eyes, he graduated from the police academy at the top of his class. After a few years on the force, the “rule breaking” attitude from his youth came back. But now directed towards his superiors, Liang was eventually demoted for an “aggressive” behavior coupled with “extra-curricular” activities while on duty. While trying to regain trust from the police department, he stumbles upon a mysterious “cold-case” that has similarities to a killer he has been chasing, who calls himself “The Snowman." He pursues the theory that they are.

=== Zhu Huiru (Deng Jiajia） ===
Huiru is a woman seeking freedom from her family and hometown, and exit to a calmer life. Beauty, coveted by many women, brought her the wrong type of attention, becoming a catalyst to events that forever change her life. Dragged against her will into a world she doesn't, and cannot, control... bridged together by past relationships with men and a homicide investigation, while under the watchful eyes of a serial killer.

=== Luo Wen (Yao Lu) ===
A gifted forensic medical examiner and ex-cop, and who also happened to be Yan Liang's ex-partner in the police force. Many years ago his wife and daughter went missing while he was away on a business trip, and now he is hell-bent on finding out the truth, and revenge towards who is responsible. Without the bodies or any clear evidence, the police declare it as a missing person case, and consider it closed due to lack of evidence. Not satisfied with the outcome of the investigation, he decides to investigate on his own. When an unknown fingerprint, suppressed in the original investigation, is found at his home, he discovers similarities to his case and the infamous Snowman killer.

=== Guo Yu (Dai Xu) ===
Guo Yu is a typical member of an “Ant Tribe” - a group of radicalized low-income college graduates – as a college-educated graduate trying to find his own place in a city he barely recognizes anymore. Then one day, his already fragile world is turned upside-down when he is accidentally drawn into a homicide case through his ex-girlfriend, who he is still madly in love with, even though she might not share the same feelings as he does. In a race against time to clear their names, his human nature is challenged as he faces his own demons of greed, vanity, and reckless ambition.

=== Li Fengtian (Ning Li) ===
Li Fengtian is a loner with a dark past. He works as a mortician by day, and by night he solves problems for the underworld. From collecting debts, to making sure problems disappear. Hired to collect one debt, he discovers a journal that brings a cash windfall for the people he works for, including answers to his son's suicide. This pulls him into the middle of a complex mystery of murder and deception. While he plots revenge against those responsible for his son's death, it might unexpectedly also lead to the identity of the mysterious serial killer- The Snowman.

== Episodes ==
=== EP.1 The Snowman Reappears ===
The mysterious and unsolved “Snowman” murder case rattles the city, with the killer taunting the police with notes saying “Come to catch me” at the crime scenes. With a last hope of breaking the case, the chief calls back the dismissed and rogue detective, Yan Liang. While the local public defender, Guo Yu, has a chance reencounter with his high school love, Zhu Huiru, as she gets embroiled in a homicide case.

=== EP.2 A Key Witness ===
Detective Yan discovers some interesting details about “The Snowman” case while scrutinizing one of the crime scenes. He finds out about a local hoodlum that goes by the name of Blondie, who says he caught a glimpse of the killer.

Without knowing anything about the underworld, local lawyer Yu pays Blondie to act as a mediator for Huiru in negotiating with the gangsters. Come the night of the planned meeting and “negotiation”, Yu and Huiru accidentally kill Blondie in a struggle for their lives.

=== EP.3 Mysterious Man ===
Yu and Huiru unravel after the killing of Blondie. A mysterious man appears to help them clean the crime scene, erasing all the evidence of them being there. When Blondie's body is found by the police, Yu and Huiru automatically become suspects because they were the last people seen with him. Without any concrete proof, the police have to let them go.

=== EP.4 The Snowman Revelation ===
Without any new evidence or suspects, Detective Yan has no choice but to start over from the beginning. Luo Wen, a former forensic medical examiner, and Yan's ex-partner, enters the picture.

=== EP.5 Wen’s Past ===
A series of murders for a missing journal puts the city on edge. The infamous The Snowman killer reappears, and complicates matters for everyone. Murder suspects Zhu Huiru and Guo Yu navigate a world they don't understand.

=== EP.6 The Detective and the Suspects ===
Detective Yan makes a bold move. With a surprise encounter between Yu and Huiru and Detective Yan that turns into an impromptu interrogation, Yu breaks down. He confesses everything under the extreme pressure of the questioning. Another murder case is reported. Local gangster Zhang Bing is killed by “The Snowman”.

=== EP.7 Blackmail ===
Cold-blooded thug Li Fengtian collects debts for local gangsters. Murder suspect Yu's boss, Mr.Jin, owes a lot of money to some very bad people. In trying to save himself, Mr.Jin attempts to blackmail his young protégé.

=== EP.8 Wen meets his ex-partner ===
Detective Yan gets some unfortunate news about his ex-partner, Wen. Yan comes up with an elicit ruse to trap Wen in one of his lies. It works. Wen confesses to everything, but refuses to provide any evidence.

While Yu finds a way to escape being blackmailed by his boss, he soon realizes that he has become the target of the underworld fixer, Li Fengtian.

=== EP.9 And the Final Answer, is… ===
Li Fengtian catches up to Yu.

His ex-partner Wen, who was in police custody, escapes and is now on the run.

Detective Yan comes close to completing the puzzle that is “The Snowman” investigation.

The truth becomes clear for the first time.

=== EP.10 The Villain ===
Alongside the series of murders shaking the city, the search for the journal continues. Survival has Zhu Huiru facing betrayal from those she trusted, as the real killers responsible are revealed. As the end nears, an unlikely partnership helps to make sense of why “The Snowman” killer reappeared.

=== EP.11 Battle, Alone… ===
After two long years, Detective Yan is still working the case, as it becomes clear Huiru is his last real hope.

As Huiru and Yu finally clear their names, and they can finally get married, conflicts and suspicions still remain between them. Huiru chooses to believe Detective Yan as she is desperate for the truth about her brother's death. While Yu hires Li Fengtian to kill Detective Yan.

=== EP.12 The Ultimate Answer ===
Huiru tricks Yu into telling her the truth about her brother's death. Fengtian suddenly reappears, to erase any last links tying him to the recent string of murders.
