= Mysterious Island 2 =

- Directed by: Rico Chung
- Written by: Fong Sze-hang
- Produced by: Chris Liu
- Starring: Deng Jiajia; Julian Chen; Wei Yuhai; Gao Zhilie
- Cinematography: Parkie Chan
- Edited by: Chan Ki-hop
- Music by: An Wei
- Production company: Beijing East Light Film
- Release date: January 26, 2013 (China)
- Running time: 93 minutes
- Country: China

Mysterious Island 2 (Chinese: 孤岛惊魂2) is a 2013 Chinese horror film directed by Rico Chung. The film is set in present-day Bangkok where Zhou Qing (Deng Jiajia) tells her psychiatrist (Leung Wan-yi) about recurring nightmares about a female ghost and a killer lorry on a highway. Zhou's younger sister Zhou Xi (Deng Jiajia) finds Zhou Qing missing and on looking for her finds her house deserted and full of horrific paintings and newspaper clippings about a murder spree.

The film is largely unrelated to the plot and cast of Mysterious Island (2011), but shares many key crew members including the producer and director.

== Release ==
Mysterious Island 2 was released in China on January 26, 2013. It did not have as strong box office returns in China as the original film did grossing only a fifth of the amount that Mysterious Island did.

== Reception ==
Film Business Asia gave the film a score of four out of ten, stating that "as the script abandons any attempt at coherence, and the direction, jazzy camerawork and feverish editing follow suit, the only mystery about this Island is how it ever came to be thrown together in the first place."
