= Cui Yingying =

Fictional character from Yingying's Biography

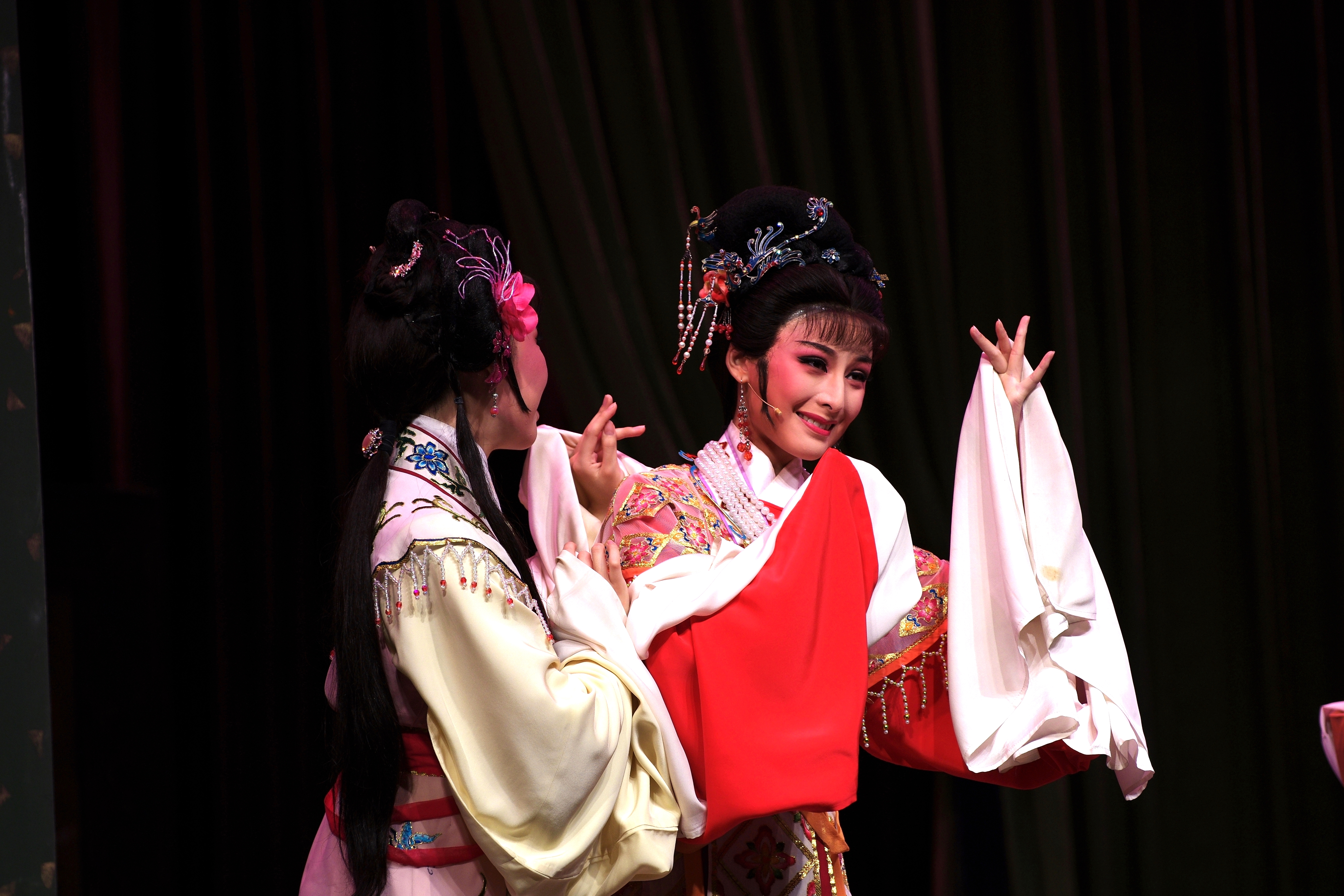
- Actress Chen Minjuan (陈敏娟) portraying Cui Yingying (right) in a 2016 Yue opera performance in Tianchan Theatre, Shanghai.
- Traditional Chinese: 崔鶯鶯
- Simplified Chinese: 崔莺莺
Transcriptions
Standard Mandarin
- Hanyu Pinyin: Cuī Yíngyíng
- Wade–Giles: Ts'ui^{1} Ying^{2} Ying^{2}

Cui Yingying
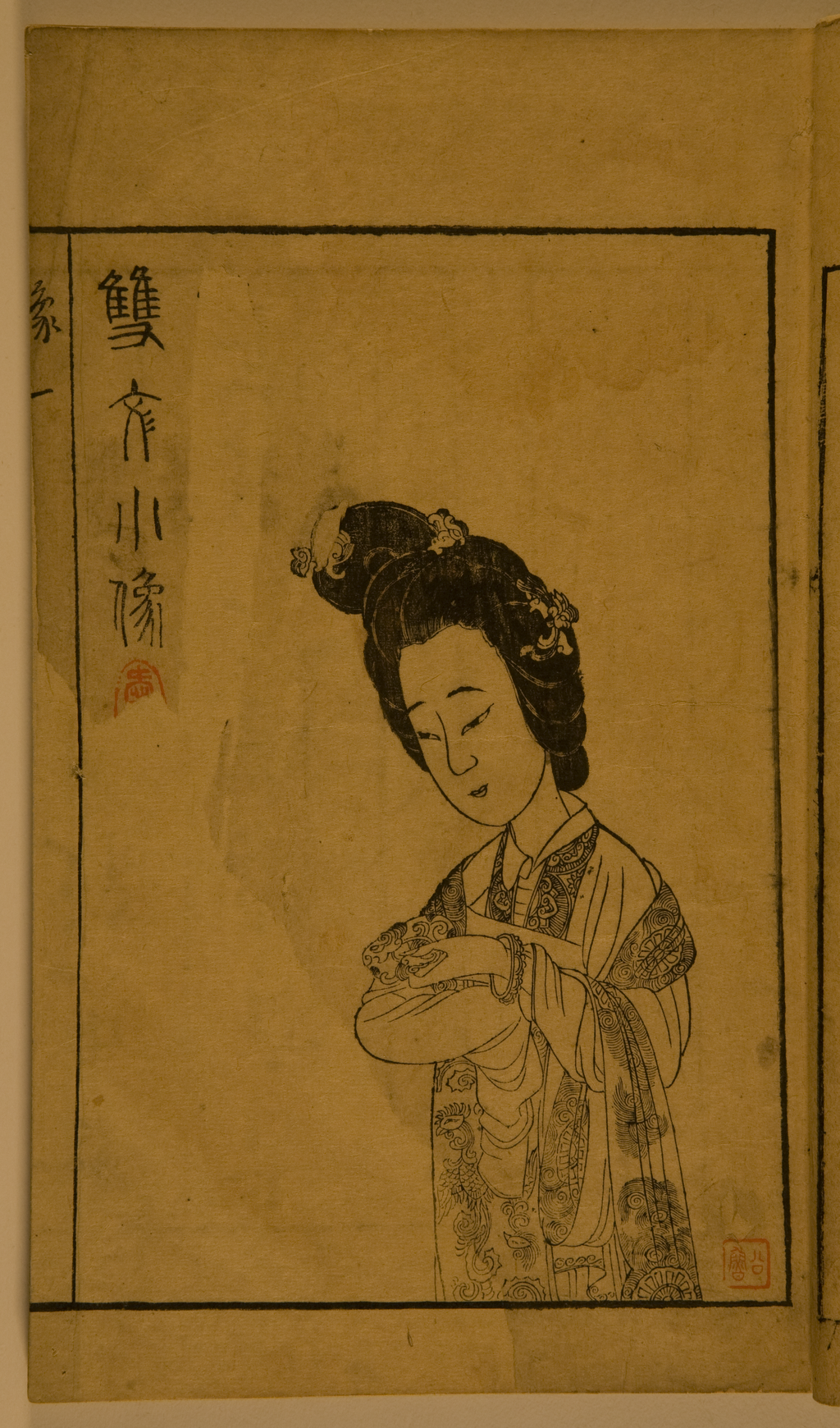
- An illustration by Chen Hongshou
- Created by: Yuan Zhen

In-universe information
- Spouse: Mr. Zhang
- Nationality: Tang
- Mother: Lady Zheng (鄭氏)
- Maid: Hongniang

Cui Yingying is a fictional character from "Yingying's Biography", a Chinese story by Yuan Zhen (779–831), and Romance of the Western Chamber, a Chinese play by Wang Shifu (1250–1337?). In these two versions, Cui Yingying has different characteristics and personal fate evolvements. In "Yingying's Biography", her insecure characteristic leads to her lack of confidence in love. But in "Romance of the Western Chamber", her highly influential and powerful family makes her confident and active in pursuing her love and happiness.

== Role in the Plays ==
Yingying's Biography:

The story began in Pujiu Temple, where Zhang Sheng lived with Yingying's aunt's family. The family hold a feast for appreciation after Zhang Sheng rescued Yingying's aunt, Madam Zheng. In the feast, Zhang Sheng first met his cousin Cui Yingying. He fell in love with Yingying because of her beauty and talents. Zhang Sheng started writing poems to pursue Yingying. Yingying rejected him at first, and even played some tricks to blame Zhang Sheng's behavior for disobeying the moral rules. But finally, Yingying wrote poems to Zhang Sheng and actively facilitated the development of their relationship. After that, Zhang Sheng went to the capital for a civil service examination, but he failed and was stuck in the city. Even though he kept writing letters to Yingying during that time, he cheated Yingying with some excuses of humiliating women. One year later, both Yingying and Zhang Sheng married another person. Once Zhang Sheng passed Yingying's home, he asked to meet Yingying as her brother, Yingying rejected him.

Romance of the West Chamber:

Romance of the West Chamber was adapted from Yingying's Biography in Zaju, a version of Chinese Opera. This adaptation is most popular and even performed on today’s stage.

Prime Minister Cui, who is Cui Yingying's father, died because of illness. Cui Yingying and her mother were on their way to their hometown to bury him. But they were stuck in the Pujiu Temple. Zhang Sheng, a scholar who was going to participate in a civil service examination, also lived in this temple. He fell in love with Yingying when he met her at the temple. Therefore, he intentionally approached Yingying's maid Hong Niang to get information about Cui Yingying. Even though thinking his behavior disobeyed the moral rules, Hong Niang still chose to tell Yingying in details. Hong Niang realized that Yingying also crushed on Zhang Sheng.

After a while, Zhang Sheng rescued Cui Yingying's family from a bandit called Sun Feihu. And Madam Cui, who is Yingying's mother, promised that she would marry Yingying to Zhang Sheng. But when Madam Cui held a feast to appreciate Zhang Sheng, she broke off the engagement, and made Yingying and Zhang Sheng to be sister and brother. Hong Niang decided to help Zhang Sheng and Yingying. She told Zhang Sheng that Yingying would pay homage to the moon at night, and asked him to play the zither secretly. At the moon night, when Yingying heard the sound of zither, it triggered her deep affection.

Zhang Sheng got ill after that moon night, so Yingying asked Hong Niang to visit him. Hong Niang acted as mailman between Zhang Sheng and Yingying during that time. Even though Yingying wrote down the time and location of the next date, she still blamed Zhang Sheng's behavior when they met in person. After that, Zhang Sheng's illness became worse and worse. Even Madam Cui noticed his illness and sent Hong Niang to visit him again. That night, Hong Niang brought Yingying to Zhang Sheng's room. Zhang Sheng recovered immediately when he met with Yingying.

However, Madam Cui finally noticed the affection between Yingying and Zhang Sheng. Hong Niang tried her best to persuade Madam Cui, so in the end Madam Cui agreed with their marriage with the requirement that Zhang Sheng had to be the No.1 in civil service examination.

Finally, Zhang Sheng got the first place and sent a letter to tell Yingying about the good news. Yingying was worried about whether Zhang Sheng would still like to marry her after his success. In coincidence, Madam's nephew, who is Yingying's previous fiancé, lied to Yingying that Zhang Sheng cheated her, and persuaded Madam Cui to marry Yingying to him. Fortunately, Zhang Sheng returned to Pujiu Temple on time and broke the lie. In the end, Cui Yingying married Zhang Sheng, and they lived happily ever after.

== Characteristic Development ==
From Yingying's Biography to Romance of the West Chamber, from Tang Dynasty to Yuan Dynasty, the social and cultural changes influenced the adaptation in Cui Yingying's Characteristics. And scholars generally compared Cui Yingying's image among different versions of her stories.

The Development of Family Backgrounds and Social Status

In Yingying's Biography, it only pointed out that Yingying's family is rich, but described nothing about Yingying's father's position. This hints that Yingying may not have been born in a family with high social status. The aristocratic families of the Tang Dynasty maintained a deep sense of social hierarchy, so Yingying's family cannot offer support to Zhang Sheng in his future career path. Not to mention that her father had already passed away, leaving only her mother and younger brother at home.

However, in Romance of the West Chamer, author adapted Cui Yingying to be Prime Minister's daughter, and her uncle is Minister Zheng. Shifu Wang also pointed out that Yingying and her mother went to Boling to bury her father. The Cui family in Boling was a distinguished lineage from Han dynasty to Tang dynasty, and it produced sixteen Prime Ministers just during the Tang period. The development of Yingying's identity and social status provides her confidence and support to pursue love and happiness.

From Insecure and Timid to Determined and Rebellious

In Yingying's Biography, Cui Yingying was born in a noble but declining family, which formed her insecure characteristics, and lack of confidence in love. When Zhang Sheng expressed love to her, even though she also crushed on him, she cannot tell Zhang Sheng her feelings, but just kept playing the zither to show her sorrow. Even in the end, Zhang Sheng cheated her, she still felt it was due to her backgrounds and status. However, in the Romance of the West Chamber, Cui Yingying was born in a highly influential and powerful family, she was confident and active in pursuing her love and happiness. She led Zhang Sheng to pursue her, and when confronted family's opposition, she did not accept the fate, but expressed the absurdity of this arrangement, which hints her rebellion against feudal society.
