= Mulan Joins the Army (1928 film) =

1928 film

- 木蘭從軍
- Directed by: Hou Yao
- Based on: Ballad of Mulan
- Starring: Li Dandan
- Production company: China Sun Motion Picture Company
- Release date: 1928
- Country: China
- Language: Silent
- Budget: 30,000 yuan

Mulan Joins the Army (Chinese: 木蘭從軍; pinyin: Mulan Congjun) is a 1928 Chinese film directed by Hou Yao for the China Sun Motion Picture Company. China Sun invested 30,000 yuan to send a 20-member crew to Northern China to make use of four hundred soldiers during filming. Unfortunately for China Sun, the film was beaten to release in 1927 by competitor Tianyi Film Company's Hua Mulan Joins the Army (Hua Mulan Congjun), which was directed by Li Pingqian and starred Hu Shan, the younger sister of the famed Hu Die.

This film is believed to be a lost film.

== Cast ==
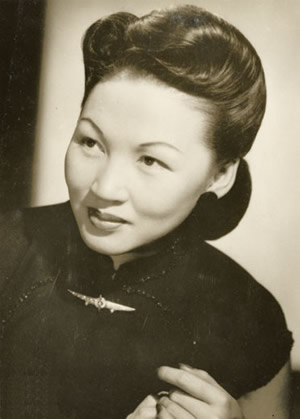
Li Dandan

- Li Dandan as Hua Mulan
- Liang Menghen (梁夢痕)
- Lim Cho Cho (林楚楚)
