= Bachelor of Literature =

Bachelor's degree in literature studies in China

A Bachelor of Literature (Chinese: 文学学士; B.Lit.) is one of thirteen (Note: The thirteen statutory undergraduate academic degrees in China are respectively: Bachelor of Philosophy; Bachelor of Economics; Bachelor of Laws; Bachelor of Education; Bachelor of Literature; Bachelor of History; Bachelor of Science; Bachelor of Engineering; Bachelor of Agriculture; Bachelor of Medicine, Bachelor of Management; Bachelor of Military Science; and Bachelor of Fine Arts.) statutory undergraduate academic degrees in China. The basic duration of study is four years.

The undergraduate Literature degree course consists of three major categories, with a total of 72 majors. The three major categories are Chinese Language and Literature, Foreign Languages and Literature, and Journalism and Communication. Subordinate undergraduate majors include Chinese language and literature, Chinese language, Chinese as a foreign language, Chinese minority languages and literature, classical philology, English, Russian, German, French, translation, business English, journalism, advertising, and communication, totaling seventy-two majors.

Unlike the Bachelor of Arts degree awarded to college graduates with majors in arts and sciences in many countries and regions, China's Bachelor of Literature degree is only awarded to college graduates majoring in language studies, journalism, and communication.

== Undergraduate majors ==
There are three major categories and 72 majors under the undergraduate Literature degree category, according to the Ministry of Education of China.

=== Chinese Language and Literature ===
- Chinese Language and Literature
- Chinese Language
- Chinese as a Foreign Language
- Languages and Literatures of Chinese Minorities
- Classical Philology

=== Foreign Languages and Literatures ===
- English
- Russian
- German
- French
- Spanish
- Arabic
- Japanese
- Persian
- Korean
- Filipino
- Sanskrit and Pali
- Indonesian
- Hindi
- Khmer
- Lao
- Burmese
- Malay
- Mongolian
- Sinhala
- Thai
- Urdu
- Hebrew
- Vietnamese
- Hausa
- Swahili
- Albanian
- Bulgarian
- Polish
- Czech
- Slovak
- Romanian
- Portuguese
- Swedish
- Serbian
- Turkish
- Greek
- Hungarian
- Italian
- Tamil
- Pashto
- Esperanto
- Bengali
- Nepali
- Croatian
- Dutch
- Finnish
- Ukrainian
- Norwegian
- Danish
- Icelandic
- Irish
- Latvian
- Lithuanian
- Slovenian
- Estonian
- Maltese
- Kazakh
- Uzbek
- Zulu
- Latin
- Translation
- Business English

=== Journalism and Communication ===
- Journalism
- Radio and Television Studies
- Advertising Studies
- Communication Studies
- Editing and Publishing Studies
