= Zhenyuan =

Zhenyuan may refer to:

== Places in China ==
- Zhenyuan County, Gansu, a county in Gansu
- Zhenyuan County, Guizhou, a county in Qiandongnan Miao and Dong Autonomous Prefecture, Guizhou
- Zhenyuan Yi, Hani and Lahu Autonomous County, a county in Yunnan
- Zhenyuan, Shaanxi (贞元), a town in Wugong County, Shaanxi
- Zhenyuan Subdistrict (真源街道), a subdistrict in Luyi County, Henan

== Historical eras ==
- Zhenyuan (貞元, 785–805), era name used by Emperor Dezong of Tang
- Zhenyuan (貞元, 1153–1156), era name used by Wanyan Liang, emperor of the Jin dynasty

== Other uses ==
- Chinese ironclad Zhenyuan, a Qing dynasty turret ship which was captured by the Japanese during the Sino-Japanese War (1894)
- Zhenyuan (真圓, 1579-1648), a Chinese monk who traveled to Japan
