= Hongniang =

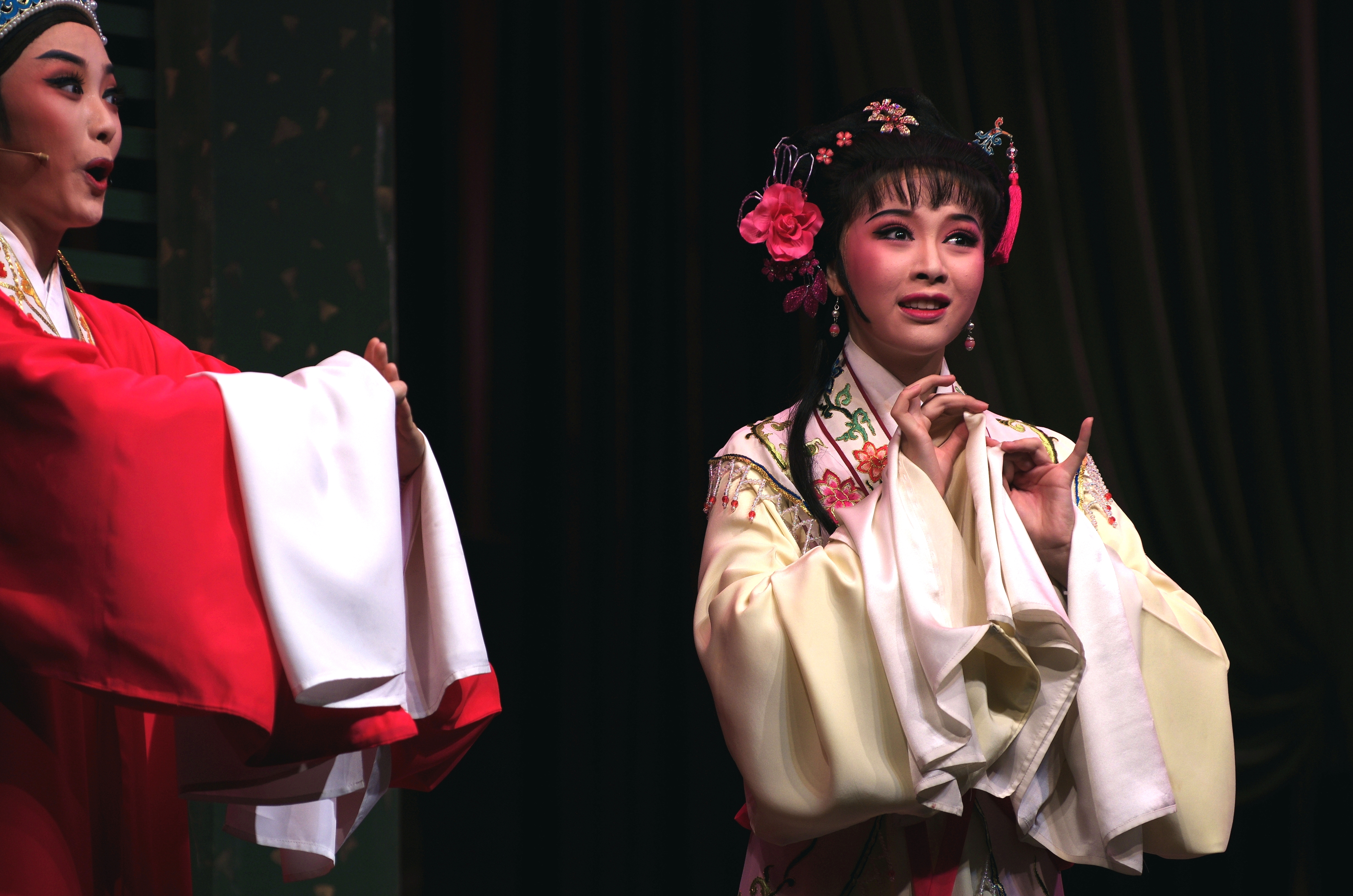
- Actress Chen Xinyu (陈欣雨) portraying Hongniang in a 2016 Yue opera performance in Tianchan Theatre, Shanghai.
- Traditional Chinese: 紅娘
- Simplified Chinese: 红娘
Transcriptions
Standard Mandarin
- Hanyu Pinyin: Hóngniáng
- Wade–Giles: Hung^{2} Niang^{2}

Hongniang, or Scarlet, is a fictional character from Yingying's Biography, a Chinese story by Yuan Zhen (779–831), and Romance of the Western Chamber, a Chinese play by Wang Shifu (1250–1337?). She is the maidservant of Cui Yingying. The character of Hongniang became increasingly important from Yuan Zhen's story to Wang Shifu's play and later versions, eventually becoming the protagonist in the one-act play Hongniang.

In Wang Shifu's play, Hongniang plays a key role as a witty, cunning, and righteous character who facilitates the love affair between Cui Yingying and Scholar Zhang (Zhang Gong). Hongniang has entered modern Chinese vocabulary as a synonym for a (female) matchmaker.
