= Minxin =

Chinese film studio

Minxin Film Company (Chinese: 民新影片公司; pinyin: Mínxīn Yǐngpiàn Gōngsi), also known as China Sun Motion Picture Company Ltd. (1923–1930), was one of the earliest movie studios in the history of Chinese cinema and Hong Kong cinema.

== History ==
Minxin was founded in 1922 by Lai Manwai. Because Lai believed that cinema in China should serve the country's revolution and modernization, Minxin's early productions focused on documentaries dealing with educational, current affairs, and cultural topics. In 1925, Lai relocated Minxin from Hong Kong to Shanghai.

Sun Yat-sen and the Kuomintang became a major focus of Minxin's films. Lai recorded Sun's public announcement of the Northern Expedition, and documented Chiang Kai-shek's consolidation of power after Sun's death, including filming the progress of the Northern Expedition. Initially, Minxin released film from this period as news reels. Later, Lai compiled footage into an eighty-minute film which the KMT branch in Shanghai approved as the only long format film for party propaganda, making the film one of the earliest party films in China.

By the end of the 1920s the company was in dire financial straits, as it struggled to compete with the much larger Mingxing Film Company as well as other studios, such as the Shaw brothers' Tianyi Film Company. It was ultimately saved by Lai's old friend Luo Mingyou, who suggested a pooling of resources to create a new company - the famous Lianhua Studios. Thus, in 1930, China Sun Motion Picture Company was absorbed into the newly formed Lianhua.

By 1936, however, Lai split off from the now declining Lianhua in control of Lianhua's Studio No. 1. This studio then formed the basis of a newly independent "Minxin Film Company."

== Notable films ==
- A Poet from the Sea (1927)
- Romance of the Western Chamber (1927)
- Mulan Joins the Army (1928)
