= Wang Shifu =

Yuan dynasty dramatist and playwright

Wang Shifu (traditional Chinese: 王實甫; simplified Chinese: 王实甫; pinyin: Wáng Shífǔ) (1250-1337?), courtesy name of Wang Dexin (Chinese: 王德信), was a Chinese dramatist and playwright of the Yuan dynasty. He is a representative of “Wencaipai” (Literal talent group) in Chinese opera literature. He was born in Dadu (present-day Beijing), the capital of the Yuan dynasty. His ancestral home was in Hebei province, Baoding city. Wang was born into a noble family. His father was a general who worked for Genghis Khan. Under the impact of his elder generation, Wang started his officialdom career as a county official. He was then promoted to the investigating censor of Shanxi Province due to his brilliant talent and achievement. However, due to his characters and dispositions, he finally chose to escape from the officialdom and devoted himself to literature creation.

There are 14 plays attributed to Wang and only three are extant. The extant three are Romance of the Western Chamber, Li Chun Hall, and Po Yao Ji. His Romance of the Western Chamber (Xi Xiang Ji) is one of the most famous Chinese plays and is still popular today. It is an amplified zaju (雜劇/杂剧), a then-popular theatrical form.

Wang Shifu's writing features in depicting the emotional changes of characters euphemistically and delicately to shape the image of the characters. He also focused on the use of foreshadowing to make twists and turns in the plot in order to create unexpected dramatic effects and depict the complex reality in life.

Wang shifu also developed a brand-new writing format compared with the orthodox Yuan Dynasty zaju repertoire, which was a cycle of five linked pieces. From dramatizing and recomposing a love story already popular in the twelfth century and sharing plots with other zaju, Wang invented his own writing style. This angle of view after popular success suggested that Wang may have been an experienced professional in the first age of Chinese theatre.
