= Two Stars in the Milky Way =

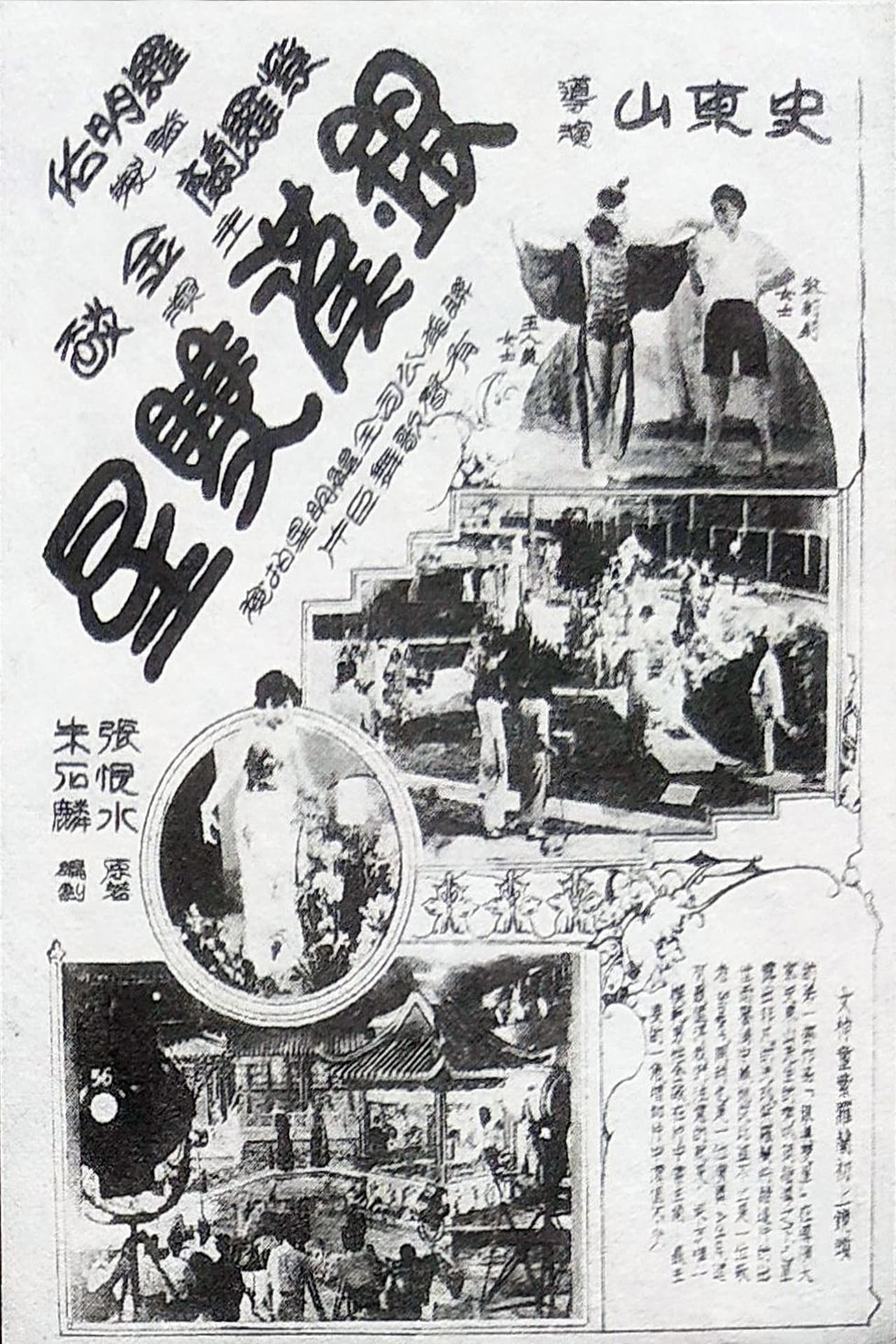
- Magazine advertisement
- Traditional Chinese: 銀漢雙星
- Simplified Chinese: 银汉双星
Transcriptions
Standard Mandarin
- Hanyu Pinyin: Yínhàn Shuāngxīng
- Wade–Giles: Yin^{2}han^{4} Shuang^{1}hsing^{1}
- Directed by: Shi Dongshan
- Screenplay by: Zhu Shilin
- Based on: Two Stars in the Milky Way by Zhang Henshui
- Produced by: Lo Ming-yau
- Starring: Violet Wong; Jin Yan
- Cinematography: Zhou Ke
- Production company: United Photoplay Service
- Release date: 13 December 1931 (China)
- Running time: 86 minutes
- Country: Republic of China
- Languages: Silent; Chinese and English intertitles

Two Stars in the Milky Way (simplified Chinese: 银汉双星; traditional Chinese: 銀漢雙星; pinyin: Yínhàn Shuāngxīng), also translated Two Stars on the Silver Screen and known as An Actor and an Actress, is a 1931 film directed by Shi Dongshan for the United Photoplay Service (UPS). Based on the eponymous novel by Zhang Henshui, it stars Violet Wong as a country girl who, after being discovered by the Milky Way Film Company, rises to stardom through a Cantonese opera. She begins a romance with her co-star, portrayed by Jin Yan, who pushes her aside after being reminded of his filial obligations.

The first sound film produced by UPS, Two Stars in the Milky Way featured extensive scenes of music and dance, with dialogue presented through intertitles and songs recorded to a separate medium. The screenplay, adapted by Zhu Shilin, featured several departures from the novel in its setting and plot. It also featured elements of metafilm, presenting a self-reflexive take on the filmmaking process as well as cameos by UPS's crew and talent. After six months of production and an extensive advertising campaign, the film premiered on 13 December 1931. It is one of few surviving works of early Chinese cinema, though its soundtrack has been lost.

== Plot ==
The composer Li Xudong lives in a rural villa with his daughter Yueying. One day, a production crew from the Milky Way Film Company arrives in the area to shoot their new film. They overhear Yueying singing to her father, and follow the sound of her voice to the family home. Director Gao Qi, enchanted by her voice, suggests that she be cast in a future production. Under the premise of using the home as a shooting location, the crew make the family's acquaintance. Over the coming days, Yueying grows intrigued by the film's star, Yang Yiyun.

Milky Way sends director Wang to attend a charity performance in which Yueying will perform. Greatly impressed, he offers her a starring role in his upcoming film Love's Sorrow in the Eastern Chamber. The Lis relocate to Shanghai, where Yueying begins work. Taking the role of Consort Mei, she is cast alongside Yang Yiyun as Emperor Xuanzong, her character's romantic interest. After they finish filming the climactic opera, the crew rushes onstage in celebration.

After the conclusion of the shoot, Yueying and Yiyun realize that they have fallen in love. He invites her to dine at the Cathay Sports Club, after which they go mini-golfing. On the course, Yiyun is approached by a woman who claims to have been searching for him, much to Yueying's dismay. When she strikes Yueying with a golf ball, they begin fighting, and Yueying storms off. Yiyun later explains that the woman, Chunping, was merely an old friend. Yueying makes him promise to avoid such women in the future.

Several months later, Yiyun takes Yueying to a banquet commemorating the première of Love's Sorrow in the Eastern Chamber. The two open the festivities with a tango, with Milky Way's crew and talent musing that they are a perfect match. Later, Yiyun and Yueying embrace in the garden. News of this spreads rapidly, greatly pleasing Yueying's father. Gao Qi, however, takes Yiyun aside and warns him against continuing the relationship, reminding him that he has already taken a wife chosen by his mother.

Yiyun realizes that, regardless of his romantic feelings, he could never make Yueying a second wife. He heads home, where is visited by the spectre of his mother, who reminds him of his filial duty to honour his parents' wishes. He thus calls Chunping, asking her to make a sacrifice. When the Lis arrive at Yiyun's home, they see the two kissing. A heartbroken Yueying is consoled by her father, who says that they will leave the evils of the city and return to the countryside.

Years later, an aged Yiyun travels to Yueying's countryside home. He stares at the door, but dares not enter, as she sings a mournful song by her father's empty rocking chair.

== Production ==
Between May and September 1931 at Shanghai Studio Two, United Photoplay Service (UPS) adapted the novel Two Stars in the Milky Way by Zhang Henshui, which had been serialized in the Huabei Huabao between 1928 and 1929. Shi Dongshan served as director; he had previously produced a series of melodramas and costume dramas. Zhu Shilin served as screenwriter, while Zhou Ke was cinematographer.

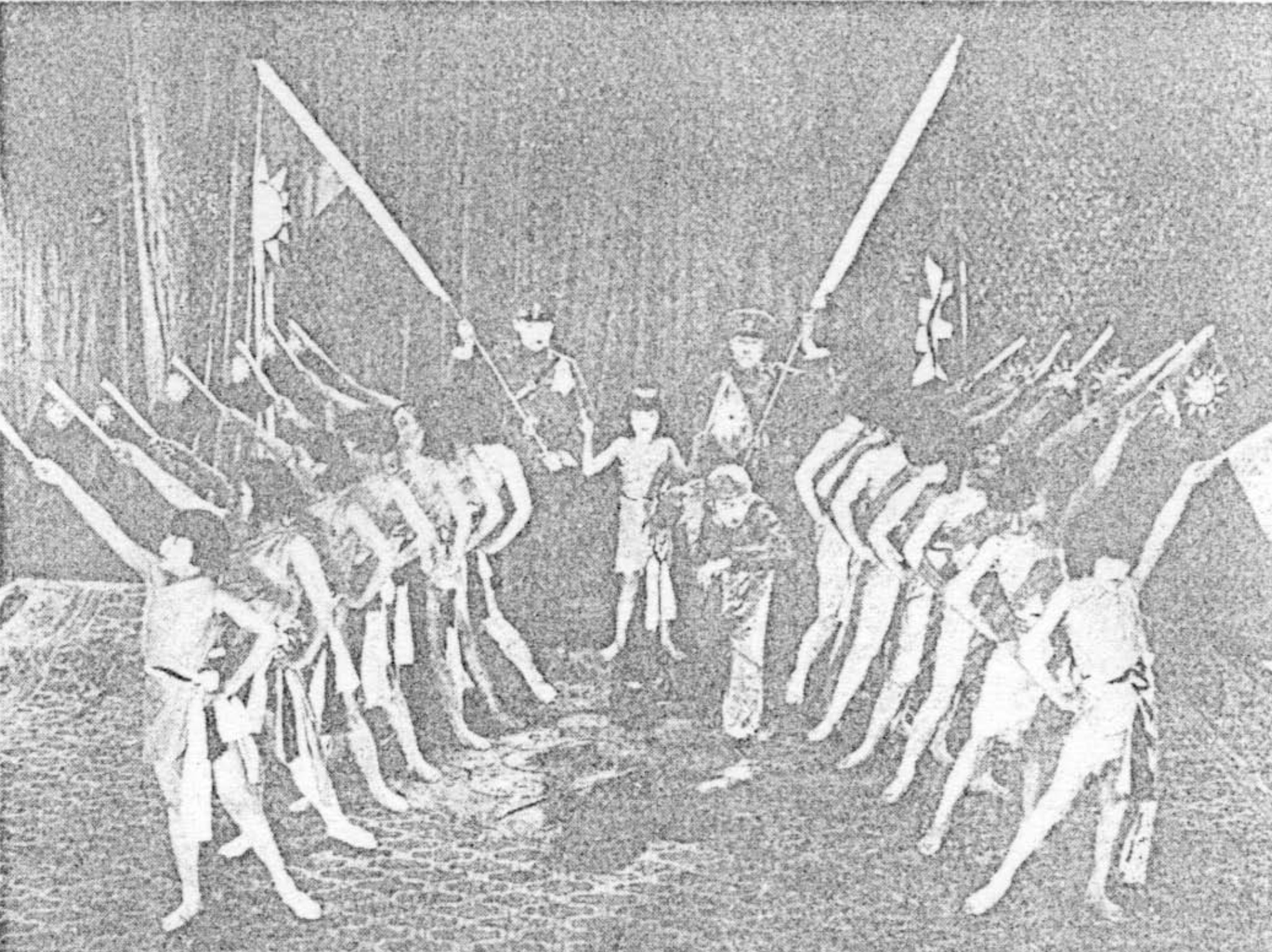
The UPS Follies featured in the film's revue sequence.

Two Stars in the Milky Way was UPS's first attempt to make a sound film. Sound technology had gained popularity through imported works, and the Mingxing Film Company had recently employed it for Sing-Song Girl Red Peony (1931). Ultimately, UPS employed a hybrid of silent and sound techniques. Intertitles, presented in an art deco font, were provided in Chinese and English to provide exposition and communicate dialogue. Sound-on-disc technology, meanwhile, was used for the soundtrack, with phonographic recordings being played at certain points during screening. As with other early Chinese sound films, particular prominence was given to singing; while dialogue was presented through intertitles, songs were presented with audio.

Four musicians were credited as musical advisors for Two Stars in the Milky Way. The film's Cantonese items were overseen by Gao Yupeng, a prominent yangqin musician. Western-style music was provided by Li Jinhui and used for the two revue scenes as well as the tango; he also provided the film's theme music. Further music was provided by Xiao Youmei, the president of the National Institute for Music. The tango was accompanied by the Carlton Theatre Orchestra, under conductor A. Richter. Support was provided by a singing-and-dancing troupe called the UPS Follies; this troupe was trained by Li Jinhui's daughter, Minghui, and had begun as the Bright Moon Song and Dance Troupe. It consisted mostly of girls between the ages of fifteen and nineteen.

The lead female role was played by Violet Wong, a singer who had toured with the Lis. Screenwriter Zhu recalled that Wong had greatly resembled the "innocent young protagonist who gains fame through her distinctive singing and dancing", such that viewers perceived the film as a biopic. In an interview, Wong described herself as having worked tirelessly researching Cantonese opera, as a result of which UPS described her as "breathing new life and voice into the show". Yang Yiyun was portrayed by Jin Yan, who had previously appeared in such UPS films as Love and Duty and The Peach Girl (both 1931) and gained a reputation for his debonair good looks. Further credits for the film included Wang Cilong, a director with UPS, as the eponymous Director Wang; Gao Zhanfei as Director Gao; Ye Juanjuan as Chunping; Zong Weigeng, credited as V. K. Chang, as Li Xudong; and Liu Jiqun as an assistant director.

Set pieces, designed by Fang Peilin, mixed art deco with traditional Chinese motifs. Contemporary reviews reported that 6,000 yuan (equivalent to ¥536,000 in 2019) had been spent on set design, more than the total budgets of some contemporary films. Costumes varied, and included imperial garb as well as modern qipao.

== Analysis ==
=== Adaptational differences ===
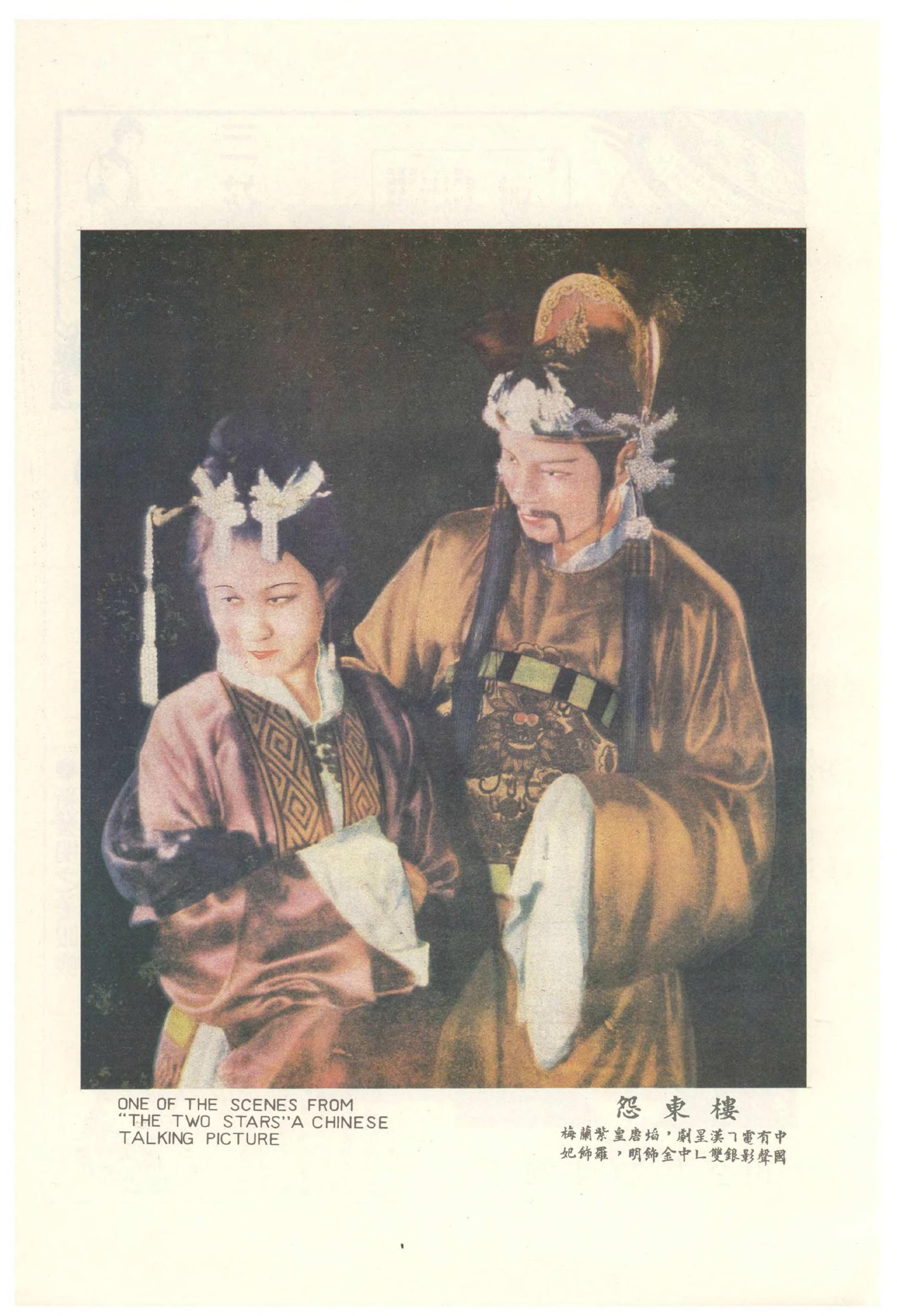
A promotional still, depicting Li Yueying as Consort Mei and Yang Yiyun as Emperor Xuanzong of Tang; the inclusion of a Cantonese opera was new to the film

Two Stars in the Milky Way was adapted from the eponymous novel by Zhang Henshui, a popular writer with the Mandarin Ducks and Butterflies school. As with earlier adaptations of novels in Chinese cinema, modifications were made during the process. Unlike in the novel, which began in Beijing, the film depicted its main characters as originating from southern China. This departure, underscored through the performance of the Cantonese-language song "Raindrops on a Banana Leaf" in the opening as well as other Cantonese music, capitalized on the popularity of the genre in contemporary China. It was also influenced by Luo Mingyou, the Hong Kong-born co-founder of UPS, as well as the touring experiences of the Lis' Bright Moon Troupe. Wong was herself Cantonese.

Two Stars in the Milky Way also departed from its source material in its framing. Where the novel had presented Li Yueying as coming from Beijing and drawing inspiration from popular media, the film has her discovered during location shooting in a rural area. This, Kristine Harris writes in her exploration of Two Stars in the Milky Way as a metafilm, emphasized the character's innate talent; the feminist scholar Qilun Han notes that it also allowed the film to draw from the cultural notions associated with these locales. At the same time, although the rural setting was more naturalistic, elements of foreign culture remain present, including a piano and a bust of Ludwig van Beethoven. A chorus line of majorettes led by Li Lili paired with an Egyptian-style dance, collectively replacing the novel's immortal fairy maiden performance, further highlights the cosmopolitanism of the setting. Such elements, the film scholar Bo Cheng writes, reflect a general tendency in early Chinese cinema to Europeanize novels during the adaptation process.

The types of films featured in Two Stars in the Milky Way also differed in the adaptation. Whereas the novel had depicted Li Yueying starring in modern melodramas, the film adaptation centred around the production of a Cantonese opera, scenes of which occupy ten minutes of the film's runtime. Such an adaptation, Harris notes, allowed the film to capitalize on the popularity of costume dramas while still maintaining its emphasis on modernity. It also offered the benefit of incorporating opera, a popular performance genre that was showcased in early Chinese sound films. The adapted opera, a romance based on the story of Emperor Xuanzong, had been widely performed in the two decades prior to the film's production, including by Wong during her time as a stage performer, and contemporary audiences would have recognized the parallels between Consort Mei and Li Yueying.

As with the novel, Two Stars in the Milky Way centred on its female protagonist and maintained her as a sympathetic figure. The stories differed, however, in their treatment of the male protagonist Yang Yiyun, who is depicted not as a philandering womanizer but rather as a man burdened by his moral obligations. This is emphasized, according to the film historian Qijun Han, by the inclusion of an arranged marriage that Yang must maintain which under the tenets of filial piety, despite not having any romantic interest in his wife. Rather than take Li as his second wife, he spurns her, pushing her away to protect her despite his true feelings. Such adaptations, according to Harris, not only allowed the film to better meet the expectations of censors but also ensured that all characters were presented sympathetically.

=== Self-reflexivity and metafilm ===
Two Stars in the Milky Way has been described as a "movie about moviedom". Such films had been produced in the United States since at least 1908, and contemporary productions such as Show People (1928) and Showgirl in Hollywood (1930) had been imported to the Republic of China. Similar productions had been made locally by Mingxing (A Passionate Actress, 1926; An Amorous History of the Silver Screen, 1931) and Tianyi (The Female Movie Star, 1926; A Female Star, 1933). The link between Two Stars in the Milky Way and Show People was drawn explicitly, with UPS identifying its film as "China's Show People". Two Stars in the Milky Way thus included a level of self-reflexivity. Harris notes parallels between the film's protagonists and the father–daughter team of Li Jinhui and Li Minghui, who had gained prominence in 1920s Shanghai through their collaborations on stage and in recordings. Further reflexivity is evident in the film's cameos, which included not only the UPS directors Cai Chusheng, Sun Yu, and Wang Cilong, but also the actresses Chen Yanyan, Li Lili, Tang Tianxiu, and Wang Renmei.

The film scholar Anne Kerlan describes Two Stars in the Milky Way as providing "a visual manifesto" for UPS. The film included a scene wherein the board of directors announces, "We in the film industry have a mission to fulfill, that of propagating the virtues of our people and of imparting knowledge to the public through the screen". UPS's fictional corollary, Milky Way, is presented as modern through its communication technologies while still maintaining traditional morals and Confucian values. Through such presentations, Kerlan argues, UPS offered itself as a "perfect world" wherein "professionalism and modern spirit [are combined] with a sense of duty and respect for cultural traditions". Harris notes that, through the narrative, UPS also emphasized its own nationalism, as seen in its dedication to social transformation as well as its depiction of majorettes.

=== Sound and music ===
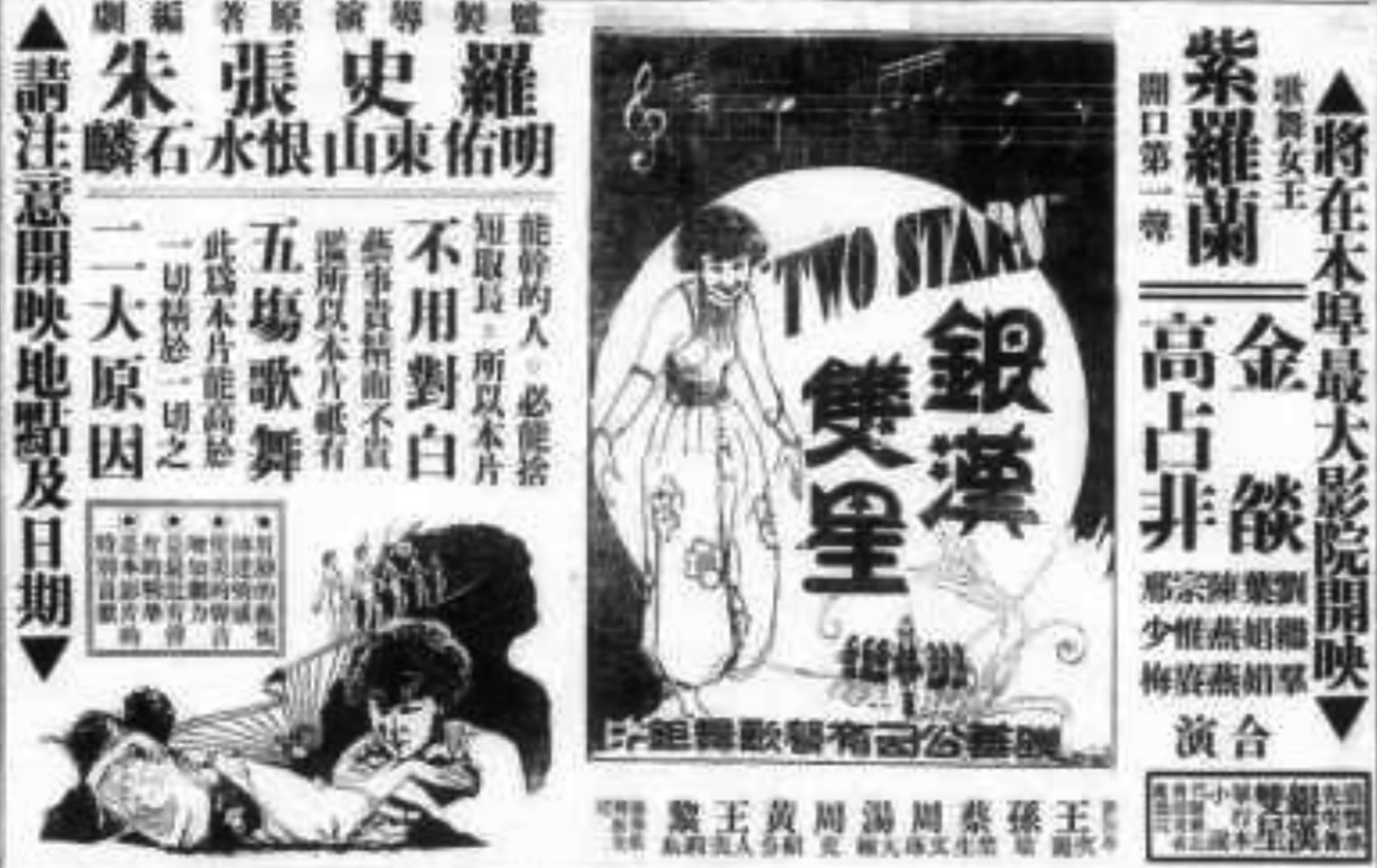
Advertisements for Two Stars in the Milky Way emphasized its musical content.

Two Stars in the Milky Way placed great emphasis on its musical performances. Advertisements described the film with phrases such as "Dance and Sound Mega-Film", and although the soundtrack has been lost, reviews of contemporary coverage have allowed a reconstruction. The film is known to have included six musical interludes. Its first song is "Raindrops on a Banana Leaf", performed by Yueying for her father in the comfort of their home. A later sequence, in which the Milky Way crew attend a revue, includes a march set to the tune of Li Jinhui's "Strive" (努力) and performed by the Follies, which is followed immediately by Yueying's Egyptian-style dance. Static shots in long takes are used, intermixed with cross-cuts to the ecstatic crew. A fourth sequence is a five-minute solo performed by Yueying as Consort Mei, shot in takes that last up to eighty seconds. The fifth sequence, the tango, is presented in the film as being conducted by Nie Er and interspersed with cross-cuts to UPS crew and talent. The final sequence occurs towards the end of the film, in which an aged Yueying reprises "Rain on a Banana Leaf", unknowingly overheard by Yiyun.

The film scholar Jean Ma describes Two Stars in the Milky Way as using explicitly staged musical performances as "a compelling diegetic pretext for the inclusion of musical attractions". Viewers are at times transported to the opera and the revue stage, providing a varied mise-en-scène that highlights the film's intermedia characteristics. Conversely, the first "Raindrops on a Banana Leaf" sequence employs dynamic shots that alternate between inside and outside the Li family home. At the same time, it is set apart by its effects, as it "literally stops the two actors in their tracks and thus brings to a halt the film shoot that is in process." Such sequences are expanded by depictions of sound media, including phonographs and radio broadcasts, and further enhanced by the rhythmic physicality of visual activities such as footsteps and a rocking chair.

As the sound-on-disc technology used for Two Stars in the Milky Way required the manual synchronization of the film and its soundtrack, audience experiences would have varied between venues and showings. To facilitate synchronization, the recorded music and vocals were compressed from 78 rpm to 33⅓ rpm – equivalent to the 24 fps of film projection – though this came with a loss of audio quality. Nonetheless, true synchronization could not be guaranteed, and thus none of the singing scenes were shot as close-ups.

== Release and reception ==
Two Stars in the Milky Way was advertised heavily for several months. Part of the advertising campaign was a reissue of the novel, with a new foreword by Zhu Shilin about the adaptation process. Advertisements emphasized the source novel, with its author Zhang Henshui prominent in both marketing material and the opening credits. The film premièred at the Nanjing Theatre in Shanghai on 13 December 1931, and was billed as UPS's first sound film. Phonographic recordings of Wong's performances were released through the Great China Record Company.

Critical reviewers generally praised Wong's vocal performance, but found that the overall sound quality was lower than that of earlier domestic productions. Wong was praised in Yingxi Zazhi magazine for her rendition of "Raindrops on a Banana Leaf", described as "a lyrical invocation of the romantic beauty of the south". Response to the opera scene was mixed, with some reviewers deeming the work to have been well-integrated into the film, while others decried it as forced and dull. A review in the Dajing Bao described the film as lacking, writing, "the structure is not good, the scenes are not good, the photography is not good, and the expressions of the actors are not good".

Two Stars in the Milky Way is one of the few early Chinese films to have survived into the present day; most have been lost. Its original soundtrack, recorded separately, has been lost. The sinologist Christopher G. Rea described Two Stars in the Milky Way as deserving special mention for its artistic and historical significance, and the Taiwanese filmmaker Ang Lee identified the film as a major influence on his Father Knows Best trilogy. The film has seen several releases on home video. A VCD edition, without audio, was released in China in 2000. A DVD edition of the film was later issued, with a new soundtrack. A double feature edition, in which the film was paired with Bu Wancang's A Spray of Plum Blossoms (1931), was released by the Los Angeles-based Cinema Epoch in 2007. This edition featured a soundtrack by Toshiyuki Hiraoka, with the opera scenes overdubbed with excerpts from Bai Guang's performance of "Ten Sighs".

== Works cited ==
- "A Spray of Plum Blossoms; Two Stars in the Milky Way". WorldCat.
- "A Talented Child Actress: Violet Wong, A Tragedienne in the Teens". The North-China Herald and Supreme Court & Consular Gazette. 8 September 1928. p. 435. ProQuest 1371399455.
- Cheng, Bo (2023). "The Occurrence of Cross-Media and Cross-Cultural Anxiety: Two Stars in the Milky Way from the Perspective of Meta Film". Journal of Chinese Film Studies. 3 (3): 543–562. doi:10.1515/jcfs-2023-0064.
- Fu, Yongchun (2019). The Early Transnational Chinese Cinema Industry. London and New York: Routledge. ISBN 978-0-429-95378-1.
- Han, Qijun (2015). "The Portrayal of Family in Early Chinese Melodrama Films". Critical Arts. 29 (3): 419–436. doi:10.1080/02560046.2015.1059557.
- Harris, Kristine (2012). "Two Stars on the Silver Screen: The Metafilm as Chinese Modern". In Henriot, Christian; Yeh, Wen-hsin (eds.). History in Images: Pictures and Public Space in Modern China. China Research Monograph. Vol. 66. Berkeley: Institute of East Asian Studies. pp. 191–244. ISBN 978-155729-155-4.
- Jones, Andrew F. (2001). Yellow Music. Durham, North Carolina: Duke University Press. doi:10.1515/9780822380436. ISBN 978-0-8223-8043-6.
- Kerlan, Anne (2021). "Wishful Images: Three Cinematographic Portraits of a National Film Company" (PDF). Journal of Chinese Cinemas. 15: 1–21. doi:10.1080/17508061.2021.1926637.
- Luo, Dan; Ye, Tan; Zhu, Yun (2024). Historical Dictionary of Chinese Cinema. Lanham, Maryland: Rowman & Littlefield. ISBN 978-1-5381-5730-5.
- Luo, Ting (2024). "From Self-Promotion to Demystification: Self-Reflexivity and Realism in Chinese Cinema". Journal of Film and Video. 76 (4): 5–18. doi:10.5406/19346018.76.4.02.
- Ma, Jean (2015). "Listening to Early Chinese Sound Film: Two Stars in the Milky Way" (PDF). Cine-Files. 8: 1–5. Archived from the original (PDF) on 24 September 2021.
- Ma, Jean (2015). Sounding the Modern Woman: The Songstress in Chinese Cinema. Durham, North Carolina: Duke University Press. ISBN 978-0-8223-5865-7.
- Rea, Christopher (2021). Chinese Film Classics, 1922–1949. New York: Columbia University Press. ISBN 978-0-231-18813-5.
- Shi Dongshan (2007). Two Stars in the Milky Way (DVD). Los Angeles: Cinema Epoch. OCLC 182625756.
- Yeh, Yueh-Yu (2002). "Historiography and Sinification: Music in Chinese Cinema of the 1930s". Cinema Journal. 41 (3): 78–97. doi:10.1353/cj.2002.0012. JSTOR 1225700.
- Zhang, Ling (2023). "Mental Hearing of Sound: The Evocation and Mediation of Acoustic Experience in Two Stars in the Milky Way (1931)". In Barham, Jeremy (ed.). The Routledge Companion to Global Film Music in the Early Sound Era. London and New York: Routledge. pp. 517–529. ISBN 978-0-429-50447-1.
- Zhang Wei (張偉) (2008). 昨夜星光燦爛: 民國影壇的28位巨星 [Stars Shining in the Night: 28 Superstars in the Film Industry of the Republic of China] (in Chinese). Vol. 1. Taipei: Showway Publishing. ISBN 978-986-221-078-9.
