= C-pop =

Chinese popular music genre

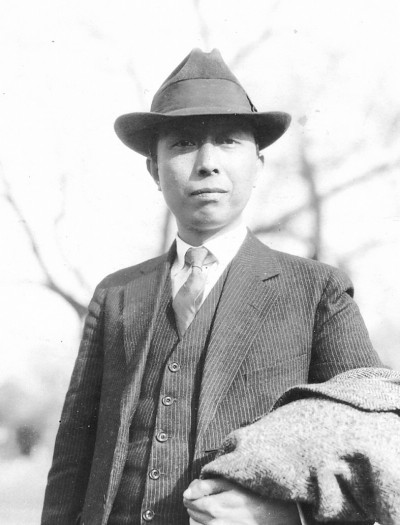
- Li Jinhui, known as the father of Chinese pop
- Native name: 中文流行音乐 中文流行音樂
- Cultural origins: 1920s China
- Derivative forms: R&B; ballads; Chinese rock; Chinese hip hop; Chinese ambient music

Subgenres
- Mandopop, Cantopop, Hokkien pop, Hakkapop

C-pop is an abbreviation for Chinese popular music (simplified Chinese: 中文流行音乐; traditional Chinese: 中文流行音樂; pinyin: zhōngwén liúxíng yīnyuè; Jyutping: zung1man4 lau4hang4 jam1ngok6), a loosely defined musical genre by artists originating from mainland China, Hong Kong, Macau and Taiwan (the Greater China region). This also includes countries where Chinese languages are used by parts of the population, such as Singapore and Malaysia. C-pop is used as an umbrella term covering not only Chinese pop but also R&B, ballads, Chinese rock, Chinese hip hop and Chinese ambient music, although Chinese rock diverged during the early 1990s.

There are currently three main subgenres within C-pop: Cantopop, Mandopop and Hokkien pop. The gap between Cantopop and Mandopop has been narrowing in the new millennium. Hokkien pop, initially strongly influenced by Japanese enka, has been re-integrating into C-pop and narrowing its trend of development towards Mandopop.

Chinese popular music in China was initially a vehicle for the Cultural Revolution and Maoist ideologies; however, during the country's extensive political and cultural changes of the past 50 years, it has lost much political significance; and now closely resembles the styles of Taiwanese Mandopop, Cantopop, K-pop and J-pop, from Taiwan, Hong Kong, South Korea, and Japan, respectively.

== History ==
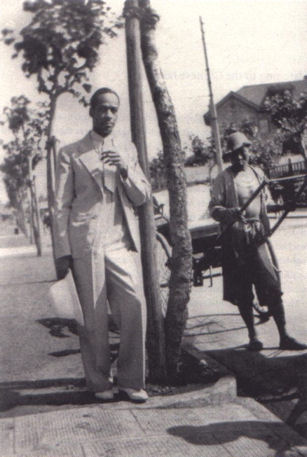
Buck Clayton, the American who helped bring Jazz influence to Shanghai.

The term shidaiqu (meaning "music of the era" or "popular music") is used to describe all different types of music sung in Mandarin and other Chinese dialects recorded in China from 1920 to 1952, then in Hong Kong until the 1960s. Shanghai was the main hub of the Chinese popular music recording industry, and an important name of the period is composer Li Jinhui. Buck Clayton is credited with bringing American jazz influence to China and the music gained popularity in hangout quarters of nightclubs and dancehalls of major cities in the 1920s. A number of privately run radio stations from the late 1920s to the 1950s played C-pop. Around 1927, Li Jinhui composed "Drizzle", sung by his daughter Li Minghui (黎明暉), and this song is generally regarded as the first Chinese pop song. It fuses jazz and Chinese folk music – the tune is in the style of a traditional pentatonic folk melody, but the instrumentation is similar to that of an American jazz orchestra. The Bright Moon Song and Dance Troupe founded by him was known as the cradle of C-pop.

Around the time of the Japanese invasion of Manchuria, and the Chinese Civil War, pop music was seen as a leftist undisturbed distraction. After the Second Sino-Japanese War and World War II C-pop has been marketed, produced and branded regionally. The Chinese Communist Party (CCP) established the People's Republic of China in 1949. One of its first actions was to label the genre "Yellow Music" (the color is associated with pornography). The Shanghai pop music industry then took pop music to Hong Kong and in the 1970s developed Cantopop. The Kuomintang, relocated to Taiwan, discouraged the use of native Taiwanese Hokkien dialect from the 1950s to the late 1980s. As a result, mandopop became the dominant musical genre in Taiwan.

In 2000 EolAsia.com was founded as the first online C-pop music portal in Hong Kong. The company survived the dot-com bubble and offered online legal music downloads in February 2005, backed by EMI, Warner Music and Sony BMG. It primarily targets consumers in Hong Kong and Macau: some songs require Hong Kong Identity Cards to purchase.

In August 2008 Norman Cheung, father of HK singer Ronald Cheng, acquired the remaining portion of EMI Music Asia when EMI, which had entered China in the early 20th century, withdrew from the Chinese market. Typhoon music made the purchase for an estimated HK$100 million.

In February 2008 mainland China's top search engine Baidu.com was sued by local industry groups for providing music listening, broadcasting and downloading without approval. Piracy continues to exist in China but Google have since announced a cooperation deal offering free listening and genuine music copies. Top100.cn was founded by basketball star Yao Ming, agent Zhang Mingji and music insider Chen Ge via a 20 million yuan investment. Google mp3 became available in March 2009. The future of C-pop in mainland China is slowly emerging. However, the Chinese government's banning of the highly popular show Super Girl for one year in 2008 and 2012 still a very controversial for the mainland China market.

In the early years of modern mainland China, emphasis on collectivist and party values, would predominantly set the theme for the music that was produced. Chinese officially sanctioned music schools, teaching popular music usually involves praising China's national culture through song lyrics that echo the official orientation of the PRC. The way in which popular music is taught in the school system relates to Chinese patriotic verses and traditional Chinese culture. The educational policy is heavily influenced by the government, and the "... Chinese government still uses traditional Chinese culture and values to enhance its legitimacy and consolidate its authority" (Ho, 2012, p1).

After the Cultural Revolution that isolated China from the rest of the world for more than a decade, the country opened up, especially under the leadership of premier Deng. Global economic development offered all sorts of opportunities for Chinese businessmen and the opening up of east coast regions to outside economic interests served to boost significantly cross-cultural exchange between China and other nations, including the United States. Globalization and China's joining the World Trade Organization, with the implication of a move to make institutions within the country more compatible with those of the rest of the world, and the surge in international trade all contributed to bringing not only increased economic activity but also social exposure to foreign cultural standards. Although the new openness affected relations with a broad range of foreign countries, the United States was especially important as it was a major trading partner, and globalization has helped both nations to develop a healthy relationship for future growth.

The openness to trade and other exchanges with the United States, including the growing number of Chinese students seeking admission to educational establishments in the US, facilitated familiarity with American popular music. Although this was not the first exposure to foreign music for China, as there had been a growing awareness of the unique brand of western influenced popular music in Hong Kong, known as Cantopop, the influences of American rock, and African American rebellious hip hop and rap music were undoubtedly a lot more accepted by Chinese youth compared to their parent's generation. Nowadays mainland singers like Hua Chenyu, one of the most influential young pop-rock singers in China today, sold out an Olympic sized stadium concert in two minutes and 58 seconds, demonstrating the homegrown pop music of China are at the stage of strong mass appeal. (Rupke & Blank, 2009). The globalization of popular music impacted other East Asian countries, especially Korea and Japan, and this in turn has influenced developments in China, as "pop-culture excursions between (the) three countries" are deemed significant (Tricks, 2014, p. 4).

In September of 2021, the Chinese government officially banned all reality talent shows including idol survival shows. This was the country's biggest attempt to crackdown on the "chaotic" fan culture and the controversies around them. The ban was also used to eliminate the idol aesthetic of "sissy or flamboyant" men or anything outside of normal; along with saturated influencers and celebrities. The overall goal was to promote morality and patriotism using the entertainment industry.

== Genres ==
Genre	Subgenres	Location
Chinese popular music	Mandarin popular music	Mainland China, Taiwan, Singapore, Malaysia
Chinese popular music	Cantonese popular music	Hong Kong, Macau, Guangdong, Malaysia
Chinese popular music	Hokkien popular music	Taiwan, Fujian, Malaysia
Chinese popular music	Hakka popular music	Guangdong, Fujian, Malaysia, Singapore, Taiwan

== Notable artists ==
In 1999, Malaysia's Nanyang Siang Pau compiled a list of the top 100 most influential C-pop artists in the 20th century. The top 30 are in this order: Teresa Teng, Zhou Xuan, Yoshiko Ōtaka, Samuel Hui, Bai Guang, Paula Tsui, Alan Tam, Jacky Cheung, Anita Mui, Leslie Cheung, Faye Wong, Liu Wen-cheng, Chyi Yu, Lee Yee (李逸), Danny Chan, Dave Wong, Julie Su, Roman Tam, Beyond, Eric Moo, Chyi Chin, Yao Surong, Wu Yingyin, Tsin Ting, Yao Lee, Tsui Ping, Tsai Chin, Lo Ta-yu and Jonathan Lee.

At the end of 2007 RTHK began promoting a tribute called "Immortal Legends" (不死傳奇) in honor of the singers who died a legend in the industry. The honor was given to Roman Tam, Anita Mui, Teresa Teng, Leslie Cheung, Wong Ka Kui (founder of Beyond), and Danny Chan. All six pop stars played a major role in developing the Hong Kong or Taiwan music industry.

In 2010, the Chinese Music Awards recognized the top 30 C-pop artists since 1980. They are, approximately in the order of their birth years: Liu Jia-chang, Li Guyi (李谷一), George Lam, Sam Hui, Paula Tsui, Roman Tam, Alan Tam, Liu Wen-cheng, Julie Su, Teresa Teng, Fong Fei Fei, Jenny Tseng, Lo Ta-yu, Fei Yu-ching, Leslie Cheung, Danny Chan, Chyi Yu, Tsai Chin, Chyi Chin, Anita Mui, Jonathan Lee, Jacky Cheung, Cui Jian, Liu Huan, Tat Ming Pair, Beyond, Sandy Lam, Faye Wong, Eason Chan, and Jay Chou.

At the end of 2010, Vietnam's Hoa Học Trò Magazine proclaimed a list of the top 5 C-pop boybands of the 2000s decade, all are from Taiwan. They are: F4, 183 Club, 5566, Fahrenheit (Fei Lun Hai), and Lollipop (Bang Bang Tang).

== See also ==
- Cantopop
- Mandopop
- Shidaiqu
- Taiwanese pop
- Chinese style music
- Gangtai
- Taiwanese wave
- Music of China
- Music of Hong Kong
- Music of Taiwan
- Music of Macau
- Music of Malaysia
- Music of Singapore
- Chinese television drama
- Hong Kong television drama
- Taiwanese drama
