= The Big Road =

1934 Chinese film

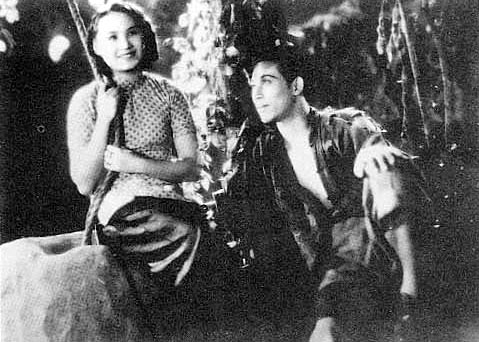
- Ding Xiang in The Great Road with Little Luo
- Directed by: Sun Yu
- Written by: Sun Yu
- Produced by: Lu Jie; Lo Ming-yau
- Starring: Jin Yan; Li Lili; Zheng Junli; Chen Yen-yen
- Cinematography: Hong Weilie; Qiu Yi-hua
- Music by: Nie Er; Sun ShiYi
- Production company: Lianhua Film Company
- Release date: 1935
- Running time: 104 minutes
- Country: China
- Language: Mandarin Chinese

The Big Road

The Great Road (Chinese: 大路; pinyin: Dàlù), also known as The Big Road and The Highway, is a 1934 Chinese film directed by Sun Yu, produced in 1934 and released on January 1, 1935. The film stars Jin Yan and Li Lili, and was produced by Sun Yu specifically for Li Lili to capitalize on her image and rising popularity. The Great Road is a silent film with music and sound effects added in post-production. Along with Wild Rose (1931) and Little Toys (1933) the film is part of the National Defense Cinema with anti-Japanese elements. While it was critically dubbed as a "hard film", Sun Yu made no explicit references to the fact that "the enemy nation" in the film was Japan, and the film contained no direct confrontation with "the enemy" on a battlefield, under the Kuomintang government's censorship policy designed to prevent provoking the Japanese. Instead, he used the building of a road to defeat "the enemy" invaders to express the spirit of the Second Sino-Japanese War in an "elegant and romantic" way. Sun Yu called The Great Road his "representative work".

The Great Road was named the 30th greatest Chinese film ever made by the Hong Kong Film Awards in 2004.

== Plot ==
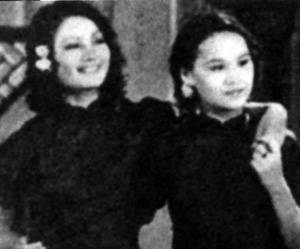
Jasmine(Li Lilli) and Ding Xiang(Chen Yen-yen) in the film

During a famine in China, a family attempts to escape from their village for a better life. The mother does not survive the journey and dies of exhaustion on the side of the road. It is now up to the husband to take care of his son, named Jin, and make it through. He does his best to raise his son while working as a road construction worker. However, ten years later, he too eventually dies of fatigue, leaving the boy alone.

Twenty years later, in the 1930s, Jin has grown up and continued in his father's footsteps as a road construction worker with his friends Old Zhang, Zhang Da, Little Luo, and Zheng Junli. As they search for employment, they meet Little Six, a former thief whom the group takes under their wing. The men decide to travel into the interior to find work in road construction and contribute to building roads to aid in the resistance to foreign invaders.

During their travels, the group befriends two vivacious and attractive women at a roadside restaurant – Ding Xiang (Orchid) and Jasmine. The group jokes around, and flirts, sings, shares meals while enjoying each other's company. As the roadwork comes closer to the front, the situation grows more intense, requiring workers and soldiers to stay up all night together to construct the road.

The group's antics are interrupted when Hu, a local strong man, approaches the group and attempts to bribe Brother Jin and his friend with foreign currency to stop building the road during a banquet at his estate. When they refuse Hu's bribe, all six workers are beaten, tortured and imprisoned in Hu's dungeon.

Dingxiang and Jasmine suspect something may have happened when the men do not return to the restaurant the following day. The pair attempt to infiltrate Hu's estate to discover what has happened to their men. After getting Hu drunk and seducing him as a distraction, the women locate the dungeon by threatening a servant with a pair of scissors. Jasmine throws the scissors to Brother Jin to cut himself free as Ding Xiang retreats to get help from Chief Liu and the army. Brother Jin frees his friends, but before he can cut Old Zhang free, a guard throws a knife and mortally wounds Old Zhang. The construction crew and army rally and storm Hu's house to complete the rescue. The women prove Hu's betrayal by exposing his possession of the large sum of foreign currency.

With the group's victory over the conniving Hu, work on the road resumes. However, an enemy plane appears and strafes the road crew killing many of the workers, along with Brother Jin and all his friends. After the carnage, Ding Xiang stands alone with her father as the spirits of her dead friends rise and continue their labour while joyfully singing.

== Cast & Character Introduction ==
Actor	Character	Description
Jin Yan 金焰	Brother Jin	Brother Jin is a strong, hard-working man who is the leader of the road construction group. He has his own ideas and is both humorous and confident, and he is never intimidated by any difficulties. As a child, his family travelled to escape famine, and his mother died on the road. He then followed his father (whose role was also played by Jin Yan) to do road hammering work. After his father's death, he continues to be a road builder who later builds roads for military use.
Zhang Yi 张翼	Old Zhang	Old Zhang is one of Brother Jin's companions who is very strong and muscular. He looks pessimistic and silent on the outside, but in contrast, he is brave and overcomes obstacles with great fortitude.
Zheng Junli 郑君里	Zheng Jun	Zheng Jun is one of Brother Jin's companions. He was a university student who fled from Dong Bei province; he is very well-educated, nationalistic and intelligent. He composes the songs for the crew members to sing during their working time.
Luo Peng 罗朋	Little Luo	Little Luo is one of Brother Jin's companions who is young and strong. He admires Brother Jin very much and has a romantic relationship with Ding Xiang. He has always dreamed about operating a road steamer and achieves this at the end of the film, but was killed shortly after by the "enemies".
Zhang Zhizhi 章志直	Big Zhang	Big Zhang is one of Brother Jin's companions who is big and reckless. He sometimes misbehaved and was criticized by Brother Jin and Zheng Jun. They have even fought against each other but still remained close afterwards.
Han Langen 韩蓝根	Little Six	Little Six is a former thief who became Brother Jin's companion. He is full of ideas and only chose to become a thief when he was desperate and out of food. After Brother Jin saved him, he also became a road builder.
Liu Qiong 刘琼	Big Liu	Big Liu is a road builder who likes to drive machines.
Li Lili 黎莉莉	Jasmine	Jasmine works at Ding Fu Ji restaurant with Ding Xiang and was once a flower drum singer. She is extroverted, bold and displays masculine qualities throughout the film. Her braveness and cleverness are shown when she helps Brother Jin and his companions escape Hu's dungeon. She shares a romantic bond with Brother Jin that is revealed at the end of the film by holding hands.
Chen Yen-yen 陈燕燕	Ding Xiang	Ding Xiang (Orchid) is the daughter of the Ding Fu Ji restaurant's owner and is excellent at cooking stir-fried vinegar fish. She is close friends with Jasmine, though she is more like a little sister to Jasmine. She is shy, introverted and gentle. She shares a romantic bond with Little Luo. At the end of The Big Road, she and her father are the only two people who survive the air raid.
Liu Jiqun 刘继群	Ding Xiang's father	Ding Xiang's father is the owner of Ding Fu Ji restaurant. He appreciates the road builder's hard work and thinks it's okay for them to have some fun in their spare time.
Shang Guanwu 尚冠武	Deputy Hu	Deputy Hu is a wealthy landlord who later collaborates with the enemies and intends to use money to induce Brother Jin and others to leave the construction site and stop building that important military transportation line. After being rejected by Brother Jin, he ordered the thugs to imprison them in the dungeon, which resulted in Old Zhang's death. But he was later arrested as a traitor.
Hong Jingling 洪警铃	Old Hong	Old Hong is the manager/housekeeper of Deputy Hu, who introduces Brother Jin and the rest to Hu and helps Hu come up with wicked ideas. Jasmine seemingly respects him but makes funny faces when she turns away. Brother Jin messes with him by "taking him to ride an airplane," which is, in fact, lifting Hong to his shoulders and turning him around rapidly, which leaves Hong feeling dizzy and embarrassed.

== Critical reception ==
The Great Road is generally thought to be a leftist film for characteristics such as opposition against invasion and suppression, positive portray of lower classes, and collective violence. Director Sun Yu was a member of an underground film team headed by Xia Yan formed by the Chinese Communist Party – the team following the Soviet model after 1917. The scholar Chris Berry compares the Chinese leftist films of the thirties, including The Big Road, to the third cinema for their similar characteristics of anti-imperialism and lower class portrayals. The film uses popular entertainment – songs, slapstick comedy and romance – to rally audiences to the leftist cause, and it is the first Chinese film that features workers as the protagonists. The names of the characters alone show strong tight to the people of the grassroot class.

The Big Road was among leftist films criticized or denounced by left-wing filmmakers and critics of the day due to depictions of pre-Japanese aggression of country life as peaceful. Leftists felt the film whitewashed the evils of the KMT government. For example, shots of the KMT government flag and KMT troops fight the Japanese invaders. As Situ Huimin recalls: "We denounced him as surrendering to the KMT as he [Sun Yu] did not clearly show his anti-KMT position in the film".

Scholar Hye Seung Chung suggests that The Big Road is an allegory of Sino-Korean unity, founded upon a common resistance against the Japanese Empire when the film's Chinese release. Actor Jin Yan (Kim Yôm) embodies the anticolonial spirit through his performance in resistance films such as The Big Road. The film provided Kim with an alternative avenue to express anti-Japanese sentiments held by Koreans whose freedom of speech, native language, and historical traditions were lost or forbidden in occupied Korea.

Director Sun Yu endowed his characters with romantic sentiments, optimism, and an enterprising spirit through their collective action as road workers and used struggle, optimism and belief in victory to coordinate their spirit. The films patriotic narrative produces constant tension with the visual pleasure in Sun's films after 1933 (The Little Toys (Playthings), Queen of Sports (Sports Queen), The Big Road), diverting the woman's bodily display from the intimate space of heterosexuality to a more open site. Women's bodies became a public site of propaganda. Under the struggle between patriotic discourse and visual pleasure, women characters in these films went far beyond the male (as the subject) and female (as the object) binary gender matrix.

Chris Berry relates the "oddball figure" of Li Lili's character, Moli, in Big Road to her character in Such Luxury and suggests that Moli can be read as a partly unprecedented type, as well as a re-inscription of types like the Wudan, the female warrior of opera in China. On the other hand, Ding Xiang represents a classic filial daughter that is consistent with traditional Chinese value.

This film takes a bold attempt in gender perspective, where it shows shots of male bodies through a woman's eyes. In these scenes, the filmmakers twist the conventional position of male being the "subject" and female the "object" on the screen. In addition, the film includes a vague implication of homosexuality between women, represented in the scene where Jasmine and Ding Xiang hug and kiss each other when lying in the same chair. However, the message may be delusive since their dialogue consists of topics about the males. These unconventional approaches of Sun Yu's "Chop Suey" style are thought to show western influence.

There are two types of love portrayed in the film: the explicit love between Xiao Luo and Ding Xiang, and the implicit and more restrained love between Brother Jin and Jasmine. The latter is vaguely shown at the very end of the film when they finally held hands after death. Moreover, the Chinese concept of family is firmly anchored in two relationships in the film – the individual-family relationship and the nation-family relationship.

== Music ==
The film includes four dubbed songs that are pre-recorded, then played on the spot during screenings. The theme song, "Song of the Great Road" (大路歌) is composed by Nie Er, with lyrics by Sun Yu; however, it is not an entirely new song as it is an adaptation of a Hollywood version of a Russian folk song in The Volga Boatman. Aside from expressing the tramps of the road builders, they believe the song should emphasize more on the vigorous spirit of the fight for freedom and liberation of the contemporary youth with a heavy responsibility. The theme song is repeated multiple times throughout the film as a transition between scenes of road construction. At the end of the film, "Song of the Great Road" reemerges as the dead workers are brought back to life as joyful and lively spectral beings.

When the road builders and the villagers are gathered in the inn, Jasmine sings for them a traditional folk song about the hardships and suffering of the ordinary Chinese people, titled "New Song of Fengyang" (新凤阳歌).

Aside from the theme song "Song of the Great Road", each song has its lyrics as subtitles at the base of the frame in Chinese characters. This allowed audiences to read the lyrics while the characters sang them, as is the convention in Chinese film.

In the film, "Roadbuilding Pioneers" (開路先鋒) and "Song of the Great Road" (大路歌) are declarative new songs sung by road workers, while "New Song of Fengyang"(新鳳陽歌) and "Yanyan's Song" (燕燕歌) are stylistically closer to traditional folk melodies sung by female voices, clearly distinguishing a difference in gender roles. However, this did not mean that the new collective voice or musical figure was male-dominated – the new voice of women, especially working-class women, was heard in sound cinema at this time. Although Jasmine represents a female voice by singing "New Song of Fengyang" (新鳳陽歌), she also joins the road workers in the climactic battle against foreign invaders while "Song of the Big Road" plays, sounding like an anthem in the background.

== Original soundtrack ==
Song title	Type	Lyricist	Composer
Roadbuilding Pioneers(开路先锋)	Overture	Sun ShiYi(孙师毅)	Nie Er(聂耳)
Song of the Great Road(大路歌)	Theme	Sun Yu(孙瑜)	Nie Er(聂耳)
Yanyan's Song (燕燕歌)	Interlude	An E(安娥)	Ren Guang(任光)
New Song of Fengyang(新凤阳歌)	Interlude	An E(安娥)	Ren Guang(任光)

== Reputation ==
The Great Road was sent to the (1935) Moscow International Film Festival as one of China's first films to participate in. However, to avoid the obstruction of the northeast Japanese invaders, the movie was detoured in Moscow, and could not be in the film festival. ("Song of The Fishermen" was delivered on time and won the "honorary award"). The unique artistic style of "The Great Road" has won the attention and praise of foreign audiences and critics. For example, at the China Film Retrospective Exhibition held in London in 1985, The Big Road was promoted by the British industry. History proves that "The Big Road" is an exemplary film in Classical Chinese cinema.

The film expresses a strong patriotic message, but due to national policy for advocating peace and tolerance, the film cannot directly address Japan as their enemy. In order to avoid the censorship of the film by the two government censorship agencies in Nanjing and Shanghai. The script of The Great Road tried to avoid the prohibited words, and writes "Japanese imperialism" as "enemy country", "Japanese aggression invades China" as "advancing artillery fire", and changes "Chinese land" to "the land of weak nations" ", writing "resistance against Japan and salvation" as "resistance for self-rescue", "war for survival of the nation", prompting "a large area of land" to the occupied Northeast China, etc. Despite this, the patriotic sentiment of the film is also very incisive, the message remain clear, and the national song composer Nie Er made several songs for the film.

== English translations ==
The film is available on YouTube with English subtitles.

The film was released as The Big Road in the United States on Region 0 DVD on May 8, 2007 by Cinema Epoch. The disc featured English subtitles and also included Sun Yu's Queen of Sports.

== See also ==
- List of Chinese films of the 1930s
- Nudity in film (East Asian cinema since 1929)
- Long March (related to The Big Road)
- Second Sino-Japanese War
- Burma Road (a highway constructed during the Second Sino-Japanese War)
