= Drizzle (disambiguation) =

Drizzle is a light liquid precipitation.

Drizzle may also refer to:

- Drizzle (image processing), a digital image processing method
- Drizzle (database server), a database management system
- "Drizzle" (song), a 1927 Mandarin-language song
