= Li Minghui =

Chinese actress (1909–2003)

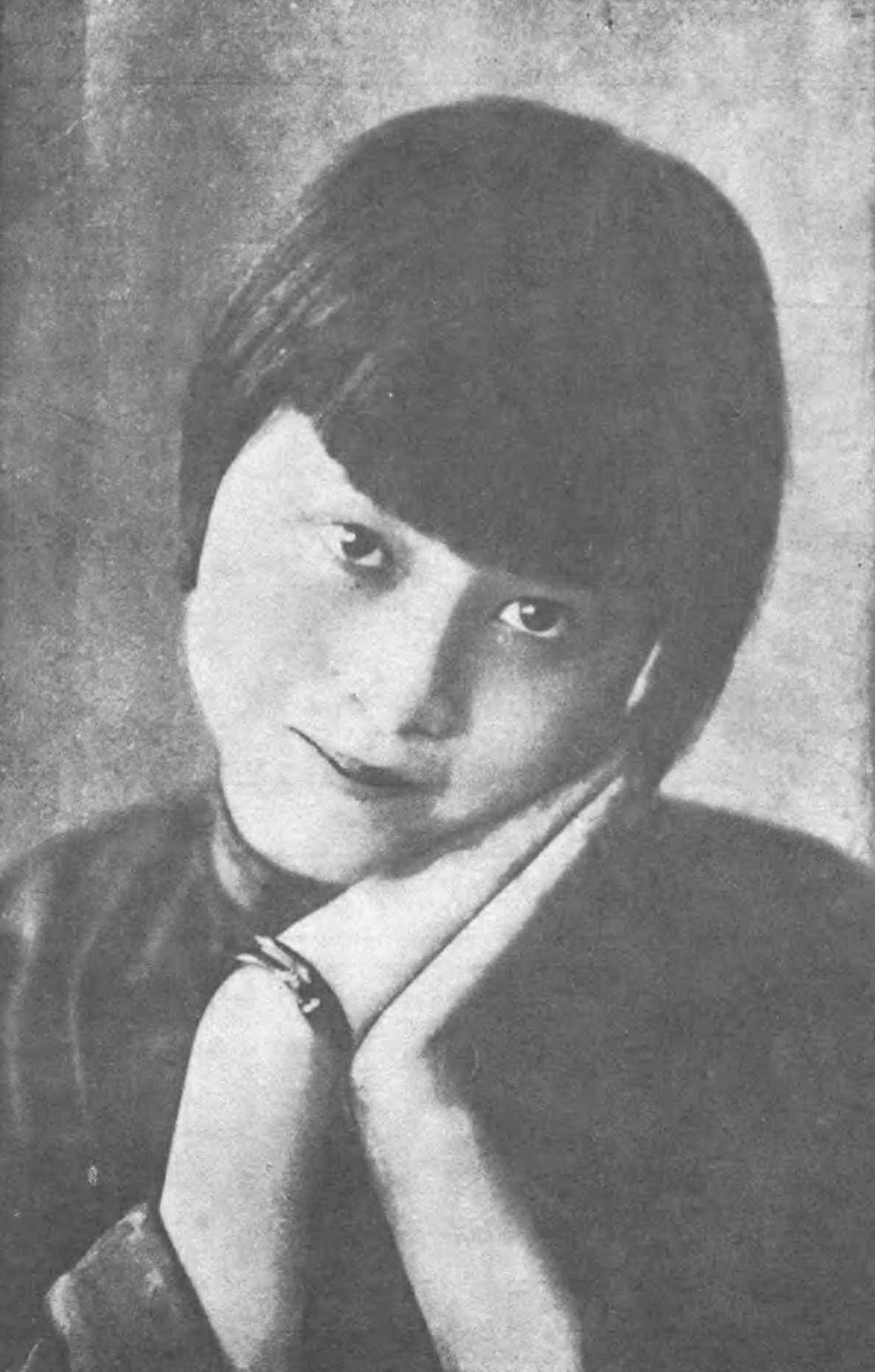
- Li, 1926
- Born: 1909; Xiangtan, Hunan, Qing China
- Died: 9 December 2003 (aged 94); Shanghai, China

Chinese name
- Traditional Chinese: 黎明暉
- Simplified Chinese: 黎明晖
Transcriptions
Standard Mandarin
- Hanyu Pinyin: Lí Mínghuī
- Wade–Giles: Li^{2} Ming^{2}hui^{1}
- IPA: [lǐ mǐŋ.xwéɪ]

Li Minghui (simplified Chinese: 黎明晖; traditional Chinese: 黎明暉; pinyin: Lí Mínghuī, 1909 – 9 December 2003) was a Chinese actress, dancer, and singer. The daughter of Li Jinhui, she featured in his musicals from a young age, despite tradition expecting female roles to be played by men. By the age of eighteen she had appeared in numerous films, stage dramas, and phonograph records, taking a hiatus in 1928 to tour Southeast Asia with her father's Bright Moon Song and Dance Troupe. After returning to China, she worked for the United Photoplay Service and continued her singing and acting through 1938.

== Biography ==
Li was born in Xiangtan, Hunan, in 1909. Her father, Li Jinhui, was a noted composer and professor at Beijing University. Having organized his own touring troupe, he trained Minghui in singing and dancing from a young age. She and her parents lived in Beijing in 1916, moving to Shanghai in 1921. There, she studied at the Liangjiang Women's Normal School. Around this time, she began to feature in musicals staged by her father, which included Sparrows and Children, Moonlit Night, and Ms. Orchid. The appearance of twelve-year-old Li in the last play was controversial, as tradition held that female roles should be played by men, and a young woman on stage would be improper and sexually provocative.

By her teenage years, Li had gained popularity for her song and dance performances. She gained acclaim for her fairy maiden dances, appeared in stage dramas, and released numerous gramophone records, including several meant for children. She also appeared in some nine silent films, beginning with The Little Factory Boss in 1925; other films included No Looking Back and A Full Moon and a Beautiful Flower. In April 1926, she appeared on the cover of The Young Companion's third issue. In her stage performances, she presented herself as a confident modern woman fluent in Mandarin and able to set her own course; however, she continued to face accusations that she promoted "licentious singing and lurid dancing."

Through 1927, Li gained increased popularity with audiences, which her father used to popularize his school for musically inclined youth. She recorded the song "Drizzle", penned by her father, with Pathé Records in 1928. Fusing traditional and Western elements, the song called for a free-choice love that rejected Confucian values. Its nasal falsetto was widely emulated in subsequent works of shidaiqu, a genre of music it precipitated. A new version, which extensively featured western instruments such as the trombone and saxophone, was released in 1934. The author Lu Xun was critical of the song, deeming Li to sound like "the cacophony produced by a hanged cat".

Through 1928 and 1929, Li travelled Southeast Asia with her father's China Song-and-Dance Troupe, which later became the Bright Moon Song and Dance Troupe. Although the tour was popular, it was not a financial success. The troupe had returned to China by 1931, being hired by Luo Mingyou of the United Photoplay Service in April. The company had acquired the rights to Zhang Henshui's Two Stars in the Milky Way, and despite the role being based on Li's experiences, Violet Wong was cast in the lead. Li, meanwhile, took a coaching role, serving as the trainer for Bright Moon – newly renamed the UPS Follies. The follies appeared in several short films for UPS, with Li taking a starring role, but these were never released. Li remained active through 1938, with one of her later films – Lucky Money (1937) – casting her as a songstress whose talents bring her misery.

Li moved to Beijing in 1951, where she did health work with the Beijing Peixin Preschool. She served as personal secretary to Zhang Shizhao at the Central Research Institute of Culture and History beginning in 1971; later, she became a member of the Academy of Literature and History. She left Beijing in 2000, moving to Shanghai with her son. She was interviewed by CCTV in November 2003 as part of a series exploring the past century of popular music in China. She died later that year, on 9 December 2003.

== Works cited ==
- Cheng, Ya-Hui (2023). The Evolution of Chinese Popular Music: Modernization and Globalization, 1927 to the Present. London: Taylor & Francis. ISBN 978-1-000-86672-8.
- Harris, Kristine (2012). "Two Stars on the Silver Screen: The Metafilm as Chinese Modern". In Henriot, Christian; Yeh, Wen-hsin (eds.). History in Images: Pictures and Public Space in Modern China. China Research Monograph. Vol. 66. Berkeley: Institute of East Asian Studies. pp. 191–244. doi:10.2307/jj.7762603. ISBN 978-155729-155-4.
- Hao, Yuchong (3 September 2024). "How 1920s Shanghai Birthed the Modern Female Idol". Sixth Tone. Archived from the original on 4 September 2024.
- He, Qiliang (2018). Feminism, Women's Agency, and Communication in Early Twentieth-Century China: The Case of the Huang-Lu Elopement. Berlin: Springer. ISBN 978-3-319-89692-2.
- Jones, Andrew F. (2001). Yellow Music: Media Culture and Colonial Modernity in the Chinese Jazz Age. Durham, North Carolina: Duke University Press. ISBN 978-0-8223-8043-6.
- 黎明晖 [Li Minghui]. Shanghai Times. Shanghai Library and Shanghai Institute of Scientific and Technical Information. Archived from the original on 12 January 2025.
- 一百年的歌声 [One Hundred Years of Songs] (in Chinese). CCTV. 19 May 2005. Archived from the original on 5 January 2025.
- Pickowicz, Paul; Shen, Kuiyi; Zhang, Yingjin (2013). "Introduction". Liangyou, Kaleidoscopic Modernity and the Shanghai Global Metropolis, 1926–1945. Leiden: Brill. pp. 1–17. ISBN 978-90-04-26338-3.
- 上海大辞典: 人物篇, 附录 [Shanghai Dictionary: Characters, Appendix] (in Chinese). Vol. 3. Shanghai: Shanghai Dictionary Publishing House. 2007. ISBN 978-7-5326-2330-3.
