= Drizzle (song) =

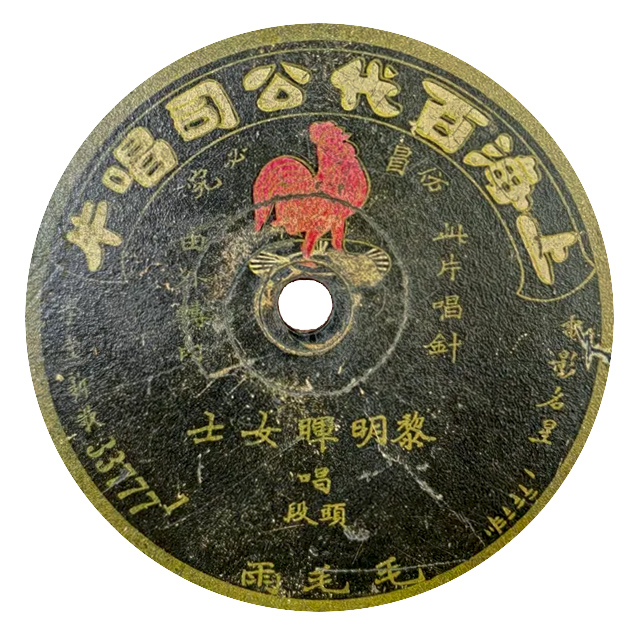

Song by Li Minghui
- Released: 1928
- Label: Pathé Records
- Songwriter(s): Li Jinhui

"Drizzle" (Chinese: 毛毛雨; pinyin: Máomáo Yǔ) is a Mandarin-language song written by Li Jinhui in 1927 and recorded by his daughter Minghui in 1928. Blending traditional Chinese folk music with western influences, the song lyrically promotes romantic love. After the success of the original recording, in 1934 Li Minghui recorded a new version with a faster tempo and heavier jazz influences. The song has been described as one of the earliest works of Chinese popular music, as well as a pioneer of the shidaiqu genre.

== Writing ==
Li Jinhui, the writer of "Drizzle", produced numerous popular and children's songs in the Mandarin language, seeking to facilitate its adoption throughout the Republic of China as a national language.

"Drizzle" blended diverse influences, including traditional Chinese strings, jazz-inspired woodwinds, and elements of Jewish klezmer. These influences are attributed by the music historian Andrew Jones to the presence of Russian Jews in Pathé Records' house band; they had emigrated to China after the Russian Revolution and found work in Shanghai. Melodies drew from contemporary theatre.

The original 1928 release employed more traditional instruments, mostly handled by Li's Bright Moon Song Troupe. The 1934 release drew more from western instruments. The latter included trombone, saxophone, trumpet, and a cymbal and wood block for percussion. It used a faster tempo, drawing from the popularity of ballroom music. In its 1934 iteration, "Drizzle" opened with an instrumental introduction that was derived from the vocal melody.

== Lyrics ==
"Drizzle" consists of four verses, each of which consists of a quatrain divided into two stanzas. Each stanza ends with the same poetic prosody. In Mandarin, each line in the first verse ends with the sound [iŋ], while the lines in the second verse end with the sound [in]. The structure of the composition blends elements of Chinese cadence with Western phrase structure.

The lyrics to "Drizzle" are described by the feminist scholar Qiliang He as emphasizing the importance of romantic love and individual freedom, as well as contemporary Chinese youths' vitality commitment to the values espoused by the May Fourth Movement. In a retrospective, Li wrote that he had sought to combine the vocabularies of foreign love songs with those of classical love poems, thereby presenting "a romance with an implicit Chinese character".

Chinese

毛毛雨，下个不停，
微微风，吹个不停，
微风细雨柳青青，
哎哟哟，柳青青。

小亲亲，不要你的金，
小亲亲，不要你的银，
奴奴只要你的心，
哎哟哟，你的心。

毛毛雨，不要尽为难，
微微风，不要尽麻烦，
雨打风吹行路难，
哎哟哟，行路难。

年轻的郎，太阳刚出山，
年轻的姐，荷花刚展瓣，
莫等花残日落山，
哎哟哟，日落山。

English

The drizzle keeps falling
The breeze keeps blowing
Drizzle and breeze amid willows of green
Oh-o-o, willows of green.

Dearest, I don't want your gold.
Dearest, I don't want your silver.
All I want is your heart.
Oh-o-o, only your heart.

Drizzle, don't be a burden.
Breeze, don't cause trouble.
Amid the drizzle and breeze, a challenging road to walk
Oh-o-o, a challenging road to walk.

Young men, suns arising.
Young women, lotus ablossoming.
Wait not for the sun to set.
Oh-o-o, for the sun to set.

== Release ==
Sheet music for "Drizzle" was published in 1927, and a pressing with Li Minghui on vocals was released by Pathé Records in 1928. At the time of the song's production, its performer Li Minghui was popular in Chinese cinema. The daughter of Li Jinhui, Li Minghui drew on traditional Chinese opera as well as a vocal style known contemporaneously as "little sister" or "little girl". She employed what the music historian Ya-Hui Cheng described as "a nasally, falsetto sonority" with a "high-pitched tone colour". At the time, contemporary Chinese culture disapproved of public performances by women, which were considered licentious. Consequently, this vocal style served to minimize potential accusations of lewdness.

"Drizzle" found success among audiences, who were attracted to its simultaneously familiar and foreign elements. Consequently, in 1934 Pathé Records had Li Minghui to record a new version of the song. The song also faced criticism. The writer Lu Xun was critical of the record, likening its vocals to "the cacophony produced by a hanged cat". The terms of endearment used in the song were criticized as overly familiar.

== Impact ==
"Drizzle" was popular as sheet music, and consequently after 1929 Li Jinhui began writing more love songs. Similarly, numerous other songs by other writers adopted the same style, taking advantage of advances in radio technology to reach broader audiences.

"Drizzle" has been identified variously as the first work of shidaiqu, the first C-pop hit, and the first Chinese modern song. The genre that followed "Drizzle", blending Chinese folk music and jazz, was rejected in the early People's Republic of China, which deemed it "yellow music". The music critic Wang Yuhe described "Drizzle" and similar songs as part of a "veritable plague of pornographic song and dance numbers" that "poison[ed] the masses" in the 1920s. However, in later years songs of this genre gained renewed popularity, having been imported from Hong Kong and Taiwan.

== Works cited ==
- Chen, Szu-Wei (2005). "The Rise and Generic Features of Shanghai Popular Songs in the 1930s and 1940s". Popular Music. 24 (1): 107–125. doi:10.1017/S0261143004000297. JSTOR 3877596.
- Cheng, Ya-Hui (2023). The Evolution of Chinese Popular Music: Modernization and Globalization, 1927 to the Present. London: Taylor & Francis. ISBN 978-1-000-86672-8.
- Hao, Yuchong (3 September 2024). "How 1920s Shanghai Birthed the Modern Female Idol". Sixth Tone. Archived from the original on 4 September 2024.
- He, Qiliang (2018). Feminism, Women's Agency, and Communication in Early Twentieth-Century China: The Case of the Huang-Lu Elopement. Berlin: Springer. ISBN 978-3-319-89692-2.
- Jones, Andrew F. (2001). Yellow Music: Media Culture and Colonial Modernity in the Chinese Jazz Age. Durham, North Carolina: Duke University Press. ISBN 978-0-8223-8043-6.
- Zagorski-Thomas, Simon; Jones, Andrew (23 February 2019). "How the World Changed Music: Mao Mao Yu – Li Minghui" (Podcast). BBC World Service. Archived from the original on 15 January 2025.
