= Jin Yan =

Chinese actor

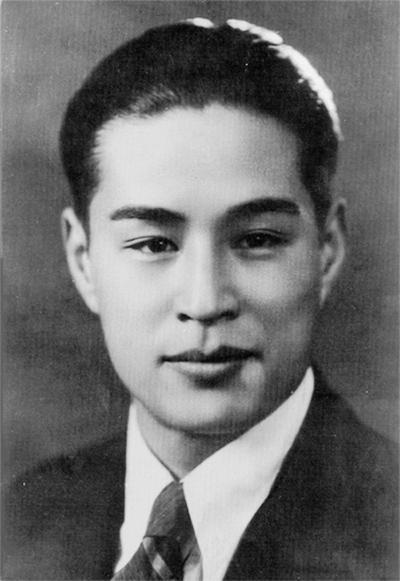
- Born: Kim Duk Rin (김덕린; 金德麟); April 7, 1910; Hanseong, Korea
- Died: December 27, 1983 (aged 73); Shanghai, China
- Other names: Raymond King
- Years active: 1928–1958
- Spouse(s): Wang Renmei (1934–44); Qin Yi (1947–83)
- Children: Jin Jie (son); Jin Feiheng (step-daughter)

Chinese name
- Chinese: 金焰
Transcriptions
Standard Mandarin
- Hanyu Pinyin: Jīn Yàn
- Wade–Giles: Chin Yen

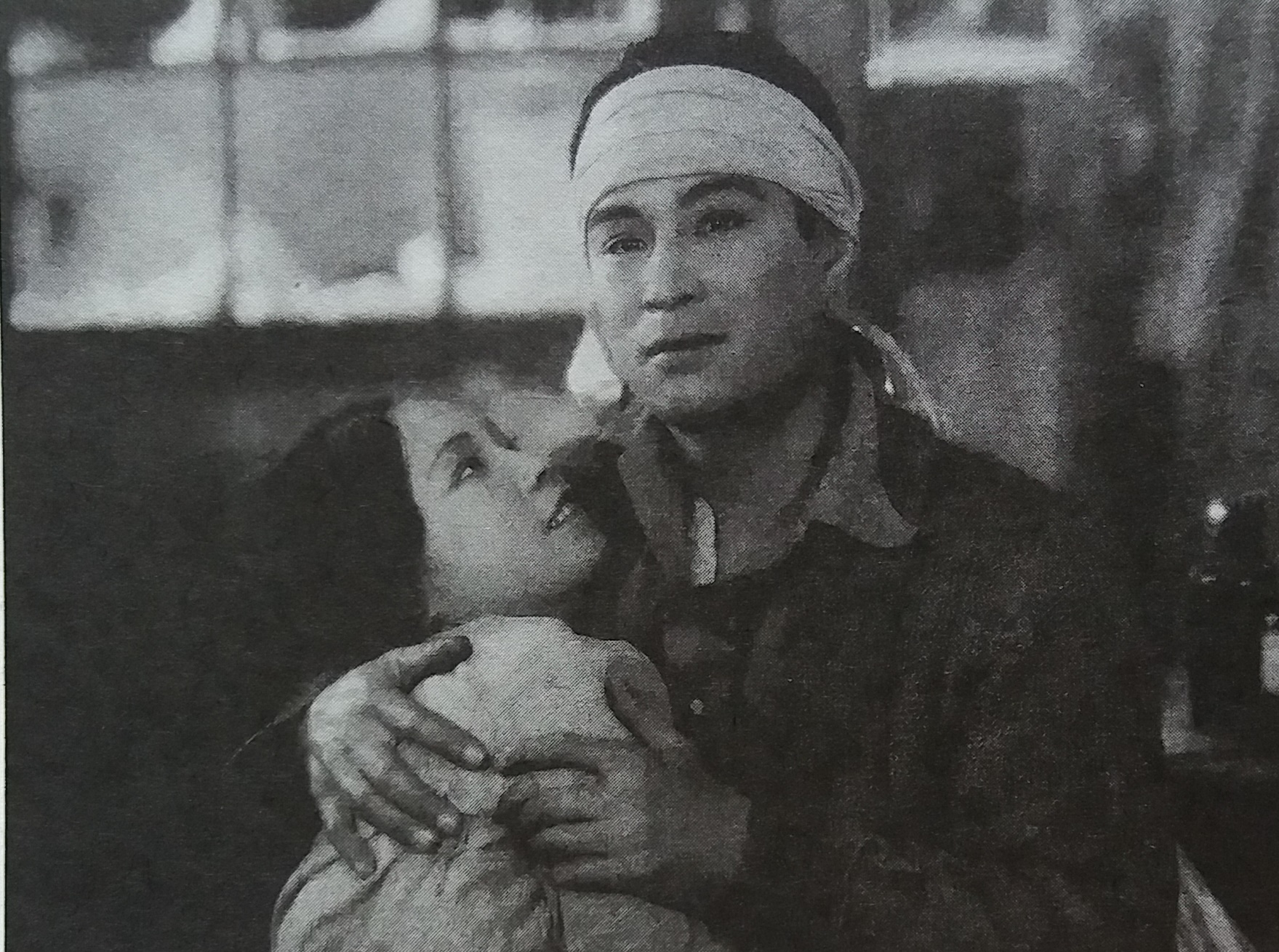
Jin Yan with first wife Wang Renmei in the movie Wild Flowers (1930 film)

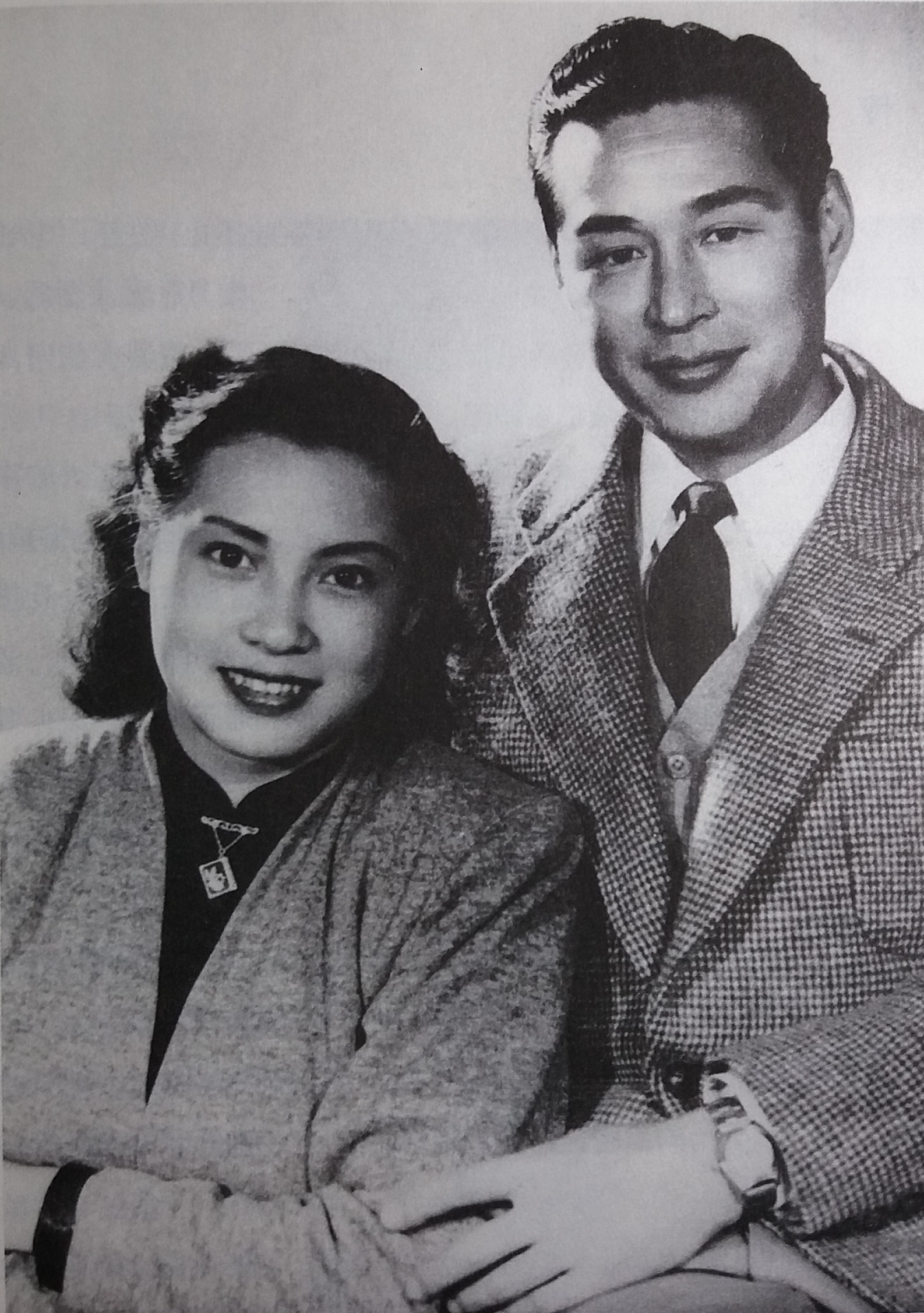
Jin Yan with Qin Yi, his second wife

Jin Yan (Chinese: 金焰; April 7, 1910 – December 27, 1983), also known by his English name Raymond King, was a Korean-born Chinese actor who gained fame during China's golden age of cinema, based in Shanghai. His acting talents and good looks gained him much popularity in the 1930s. He was dubbed the "Film Emperor" and the "Rudolph Valentino of Shanghai".

== Filmography ==
Year	Film	Chinese Title	Character Portrayed
1928	Mulan Joins the Army	花木蘭從軍	Soldier
1929	Four Heroes of the Wang Family II	王氏四俠-續集	Wang Zhang Yun (王長雲)
1929	Romantic Swordsman	風流劍客	Long Fei (龍飛)
1930	Wild Flowers	野草閒花	Huang Yun (黃雲)
1931	Love and Duty	戀愛與義務	Li Zu Yi (李祖義)
1931	A Spray of Plum Blossoms	一剪梅	Hu Lun Ting (胡倫廷) [Valentine]
1931	The Peach Girl	桃花泣血記	Jin De En (金德恩)
1931	Two Stars in the Milky Way	銀漢雙星	Yang Yi Yun (楊倚雲)
1932	Wild Roses	野玫瑰	Jiang Bo (江波)
1932	Confront the National Crisis Together	共赴國難	Volunteer Soldier
1932	Humanity	人道	Zhao Min Jie
1932	A Music Teacher	海外鵑魂	Zhong Zhi Gang
1933	Three Modern Women	三個摩登女性	Zhang Yu
1933	Night in the City	城市之夜	
1933	The Light of Maternal Instinct	母性之光	Jia Hu (家瑚)
1934	Golden Age	黄金时代	Zeng Zhang Chun
1934	The Big Road	大路	Jin Ge (金哥)
1935	The New Peach Blossom Fan	新桃花扇	Fang Yu Min
1936	Soaring Aspiration	壯志凌雲	Shun Er (Young Adult) (順兒青年)
1936	Waves Washing the Sand	浪淘沙	Ah Long
1936	Return to Nature	到自然去	Ma Long
1938	Unexpected Tears of Blood	情天血淚	
1938	Wu Song and Pan Jin Lian	武松與潘金蓮	Wu Song
1939	Lin Chong, the Outlaw	林沖雪夜殲仇記	
1940	The Vast Sky		Jin Wan Li
1947	Ideal Son-in-Law	乘龍快婿	Situ Yan (司徒炎)
1947	Spring Melody	迎春曲	Dong Fan Xi
1949	Lost Love	失去的愛情	
1950	The World Bright Again	大地重光	Lao Shen (老沈)
1954	The Great Beginning	偉大的起點	Department Head Nie (聶部長)
1956	Mother	母親	Lao Deng (老鄧)
1957	Brave Eagle in the Rainstorm	暴風雨中的雄鷹	Lao Ba Er (老巴爾)
1958	Red Flag at the Sea	海上紅旗	Secretary Tang (唐書記)
1958	Love the Factory as a Home	愛廠如家	Industrial Department Head (工業部長)

== Bibliography ==
- Meyer, Richard J. (2009). Jin Yan: The Rudolph Valentino of Shanghai. Hong Kong University Press. ISBN 978-962-209-586-1.
- Rea, Christopher (2021). Chinese Film Classics, 1922-1949. Columbia University Press. ISBN 9780231188135.
