= Violet Wong =

Chinese actress (fl. 1916–1948)

- 紫羅蘭
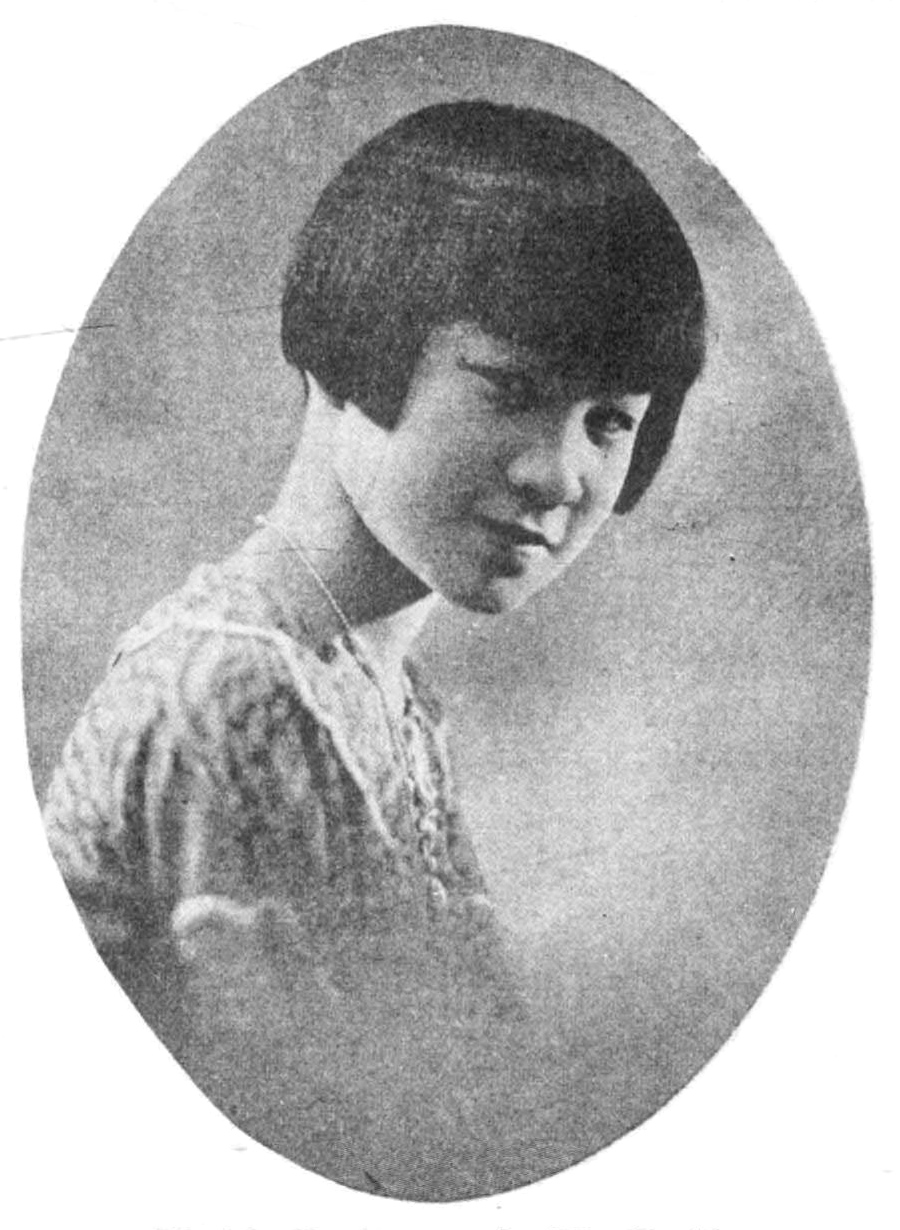
- Wong, 1927
- Born: c. 1916; Guangdong, Republic of China
- Occupation: Actress
- Notable work: Two Stars in the Milky Way

Violet Wong (traditional Chinese: 紫羅蘭; simplified Chinese: 紫罗兰; pinyin: Zǐluólán; lit. 'violet', fl. 1916–1948) was a Chinese actress. Born in Guangdong, she began singing and dancing as a child, catching the attention of General Chiang Kai-shek. She made her feature film debut in Two Stars in the Milky Way (1931), where she portrayed a young woman who became a movie star.

== Biography ==
Wong was born in Guangdong c. 1916. She joined the Bright Moon Song and Dance Troupe, headed by Li Jinhui, at a young age. She was soon recognized for her dancing skills, being deemed a "queen of southern songs and dances". She performed in Guangdong for General Chiang Kai-shek and Wang Jingwei in 1926 prior to the launch of the Northern Expedition, being invited to banquets and gaining praise for her performance. She was rewarded by Chiang with a gold watch, as well as a promise that she could perform in Beijing should the National Revolutionary Army capture the city. She appeared on the cover of The Young Companion in November of that year.

In subsequent years Wong toured central and southern China, Thailand, and Malaya, gaining a reputation for her tragic performances. Reviewing her performance as Consort Mei at the Isis Theatre in Shanghai, the North-China Herald described her as able to "melt a heart of stone", with powerfully directed scorn at the woman stealing the affections of Emperor Tang Ming Huang from her. Other performances in her repertoire included stories based on Xiaoqing, Hua Mulan, and the novel Dream of the Red Chamber. A comedy, "A Young Man's Proposal", was also sometimes performed.

Wong made her screen debut in 1931 with Two Stars in the Milky Way, a film produced by the United Photoplay Service (UPS). The Bright Moon troupe were retained by the studio and rebranded the United Photoplay Service Follies. While other members of the troupe, such as Li Lili, were chosen for a chorus line of majorettes, Wong was selected to play the protagonist Li Yueying, a young woman who rises to stardom after being discovered in her rural home. She performed several songs, including a Cantonese opera and a rendition of the Cantonese song "Rain on a Banana Leaf", as well as an Egyptian-themed dance. Reviewers generally praised Wong's vocal performance.

On 4 April 1932, Wong married Long Qichang, the son of a Guizhou province government official. (Note: Ta Kung Pao states that the marriage occurred on Children's Day in the 21st year of the Republic, which is 4 April 1932 (Han 2007).) She retired before 1933, having been active on screen only briefly; the magazine Ling Long listed her as among several stars, including Wang Hanlun and Yang Naimei, who had left the industry in recent years. The couple had a three-year-old daughter, and a baby by 1935, at which time Wong decided to return to film. She worked on some films for the Tianyi Film Company and UPS.

By 1940, Wong and Long had divorced. While living in Hong Kong, she gained renewed popularity as an actress and a Cantonese opera performer. She continued acting as late as 1948, when she appeared in the film Uncompromising Fellow.
