= Christopher G. Rea =

Literary historian (born 1977)

Christopher G. Rea (born 1977) is a literary and cultural historian, and Professor of Chinese in the Department of Asian Studies at the University of British Columbia. The author, editor, and translator of several books, he is best known for his study The Age of Irreverence: A New History of Laughter in China (California, 2015), which won the Association for Asian Studies Joseph Levenson Book Prize (post-1900 China) in 2017. He is also author of Chinese Film Classics, 1922-1949 (Columbia, 2021) and co-author of Where Research Begins: Choosing a Research Project That Matters to You (and the World) (Chicago, 2022).

== Education ==
Rea attended Berkeley High School in Berkeley, California and majored in Chinese language and literature at Dartmouth College, graduating in 1999. He earned an M.A. (2004) and Ph.D. (2008) in Modern Chinese Literature from the Department of East Asian Languages and Cultures of Columbia University, where his advisor was David Der-wei Wang. He was a Fulbright Scholar in Taipei, Taiwan (2004–2005), where he conducted research at the Institute of Chinese Literature and Philosophy of the Academia Sinica. During the final two years of his doctorate, he was a visiting fellow at the Department of East Asian Languages and Cultures at Harvard University.

== Career ==
Rea is currently Professor of Chinese in the Department of Asian Studies at the University of British Columbia, having been hired as an assistant professor in 2008. He has also served as Associate Head of the Department of Asian Studies and as director of the UBC Centre for Chinese Research. In 2012, he was a postdoctoral research fellow at the Australian Centre on China in the World at the Australian National University. From 2014-2015, he was a visiting scholar at the Academia Sinica.

Rea is a literary and cultural historian whose research focuses on the modern Chinese-speaking world. Rea is known as a specialist in the literary, cinematic, and cultural history of the late Qing dynasty and the Republic of China, having written several well-received studies of the period, including The Age of Irreverence, which focuses on Chinese comic culture between the 1890s and 1930s. His books since the 2000s have focused on a variety of subjects, including Chinese cinema, comedy, celebrities, swindlers, cultural entrepreneurs, and the scholar-writers Qian Zhongshu and Yang Jiang.

He has edited and translated the works of authors such as Qian Zhongshu, Yang Jiang, Wen Yuan-ning, Xu Zhuodai 徐卓呆, Lee Kuo-Hsiu 李國修, Wang Chen-ho 王禎和, and Zhang Letian. He has also translated over two dozen Chinese films, including the earliest surviving Mulan film, and co-translated the earliest known Chinese collection of stories about fraud, The Book of Swindles (ca. 1617).

To accompany his study Chinese Film Classics, 1922-1949, Rea created the Chinese Film Project, an award-winning translation, research, and teaching initiative whose goal is "to mak[e] early Chinese films and cinema history more accessible." The website and accompanying YouTube channel feature the world's largest free collection of early Chinese films with English subtitles, as well as an online course about early Chinese contributions to cinema.

Rea is also co-author of a general advice book on research methods, co-authored with Stanford professor of history Thomas S. Mullaney, entitled Where Research Begins: Choosing a Research Project That Matters to You (and the World), published by the University of Chicago Press in 2022.

== Bibliography ==
Thomas S. Mullaney and Christopher Rea. Where Research Begins: Choosing a Research Project That Matters to You (and the World). Chicago: University of Chicago Press, 2022.

Christopher Rea. Chinese Film Classics, 1922-1949. Columbia University Press, June 2021.

Christopher Rea, trans. and intro. China’s Chaplin: Comic Stories and Farces by Xu Zhuodai. Ithaca, NY: Cornell East Asia Series, March 2019.

Lei Qinfeng 雷勤風 (Christopher Rea). Da bujing de niandai: Jindai Zhongguo xin xiaoshi 大不敬的年代: 近代中國新笑史 (The Age of Irreverence: A New History of Laughter in China). Hsu Hui-lin 許暉林, trans. 436 pages. Taipei: Rye Field Publishing, 2018.

Wen Yuan-ning and others. Imperfect Understanding: Intimate Portraits of Modern Chinese Celebrities. Christopher Rea, ed. Amherst, NY: Cambria Press, 2018.

Zhang Yingyu. The Book of Swindles: Selections from a Late Ming Collection. Christopher Rea and Bruce Rusk, trans and intro. New York: Columbia University Press, 2017.

Christopher Rea. The Age of Irreverence: A New History of Laughter in China. Oakland, CA: University of California Press, 2015.

Christopher Rea, ed. China’s Literary Cosmopolitans: Qian Zhongshu, Yang Jiang, and the World of Letters. Leiden: Brill, 2015.

Christopher Rea and Nicolai Volland, eds. The Business of Culture: Cultural Entrepreneurs in China and Southeast Asia, 1900-65. Foreword by Wang Gungwu. Vancouver, BC: UBC Press, Jan. 2015; Hong Kong: Hong Kong University Press, Feb. 2015.

Qian Zhongshu. Humans, Beasts, and Ghosts: Stories and Essays. Christopher G. Rea, ed. New York: Columbia University Press, 2011.
