= Wang Renmei =

Chinese actress and singer

- 王人美
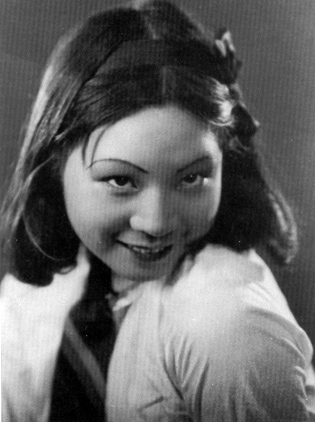
- Wang in the 1930s
- Born: December 1914; Changsha, Hunan, China
- Died: 2 April 1987 (aged 72); Beijing, China
- Other name: Wang Shuxi (王庶熙)
- Occupations: Actress, singer
- Notable work: Wild Rose; Song of the Fishermen
- Political party: Chinese Communist Party
- Spouse(s): Jin Yan (1934–1944); Ye Qianyu (1955–1987)

Wang Renmei (Chinese: 王人美; Wade–Giles: Wang Jen-mei; December 1914 – 2 April 1987) was a famous Chinese actress and singer nicknamed the "Wildcat of Shanghai". She was mainly active during the 1930s, and her most notable film was the 1934 Song of the Fishermen (available online with English subtitles) directed by Cai Chusheng, which was the first Chinese film to win an international prize. In 2005, she was chosen as one of the 100 best actors of the 100 years of Chinese cinema.

Wang was married to Jin Yan, the Korean-born "Emperor of Chinese Cinema", and later to Ye Qianyu, a prominent artist.

== Early life and career beginnings ==
Wang Renmei was born and grew up in Changsha, the capital of Hunan province, where her father Wang Zhengquan (王正权) was a mathematics teacher at the Changsha No. 1 Normal School. Born Wang Shuxi (王庶熙), she was the youngest of seven children. One of her father's students was Mao Zedong, a fellow Hunan native who would become China's top leader. As a young man, Mao lived in Wang's house and saw the child Renmei on a daily basis. Later Mao was director of the school that Wang Renmei attended.

When Wang Renmei was seven, her mother died of a stroke. In 1926, Wang entered the Changsha No. 1 Normal School. However, her father died that year after a wasp sting developed into a fatal infection. Without financial support from their father, the Wang children left their hometown to seek a living elsewhere. They first went to Wuhan, but after the fall of Wang Jingwei's government in 1927, they fled east to Wuxi near Shanghai.

== Bright Moon Song and Dance Troupe ==
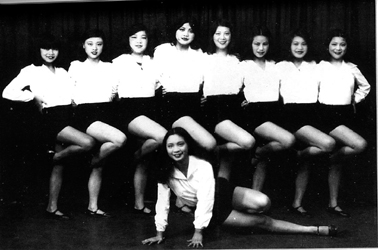
The Bright Moon Troupe, with Wang Renmei in front

In early 1928, Wang Renmei's second oldest brother Wang Renlu brought Renmei and her third oldest brother Renyi to Shanghai. Renlu's former colleague Li Jinhui, another Hunan native who is now considered the "Father of Chinese pop music", had founded the Meimei School in Shanghai. Meimei was a special school for singing and dancing which became the famous China Song and Dance Troupe, later renamed Bright Moon Song and Dance Troupe. Renmei and Renyi both enrolled at the school, with Renmei focusing on singing and dancing, while her brother studied mandolin. Wang Renmei proved to be a talented singer and became one of the "Four Divas" of the troupe, along with Li Lili, Xue Lingxian (薛玲仙), and Hu Jia (胡笳). Starting in May 1928, the troupe spent ten months touring southeastern Asian cities including Bangkok, Singapore, Kuala Lumpur, Malacca, and Jakarta. They also toured and performed in Beijing, Tianjin, and Manchuria.

== Rise to stardom ==
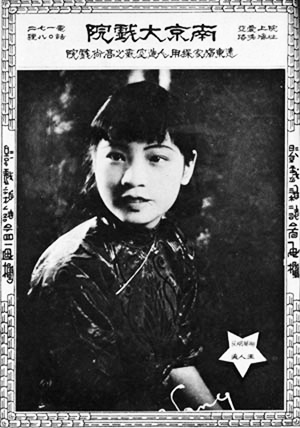
Wang Renmei on a Nanking Theatre poster

In 1931, with the advent of sound film, the Bright Moon Song and Dance Troupe was acquired by the Lianhua Film Company, which needed the skills of the troupe's singers for the new era. In 1932 she starred in her first film Wild Rose (available online with English subtitles), which was written by director Sun Yu specifically for the 17-year-old Wang Renmei. Playing opposite the famous star Jin Yan, her debut was well received by critics and audiences alike, and she was hailed as the newest star in the Hollywood of Asia.

In 1934, Wang starred in her most famous film Song of the Fishermen, directed by Cai Chusheng. She also sang the film's eponymous theme song. The film was a runaway success: it was played in Shanghai for a record 84 days and seen by almost a million people. In 1935 it became the first Chinese film to win an international award, at the inaugural Moscow International Film Festival. Wang Renmei acquired the nickname "Wildcat" from her unrestrained performance as the girl named "Little Cat" in the film.

Wang Renmei, together with Li Lili and Xu Lai, her former colleagues at the Bright Moon Troupe, were the earliest stars to portray the energetic, wholesome, and sexy "country girl" prototype, which became one of the most popular figures in Chinese cinema, and later inherited by the cinema of Hong Kong.

== Marriage with Jin Yan ==
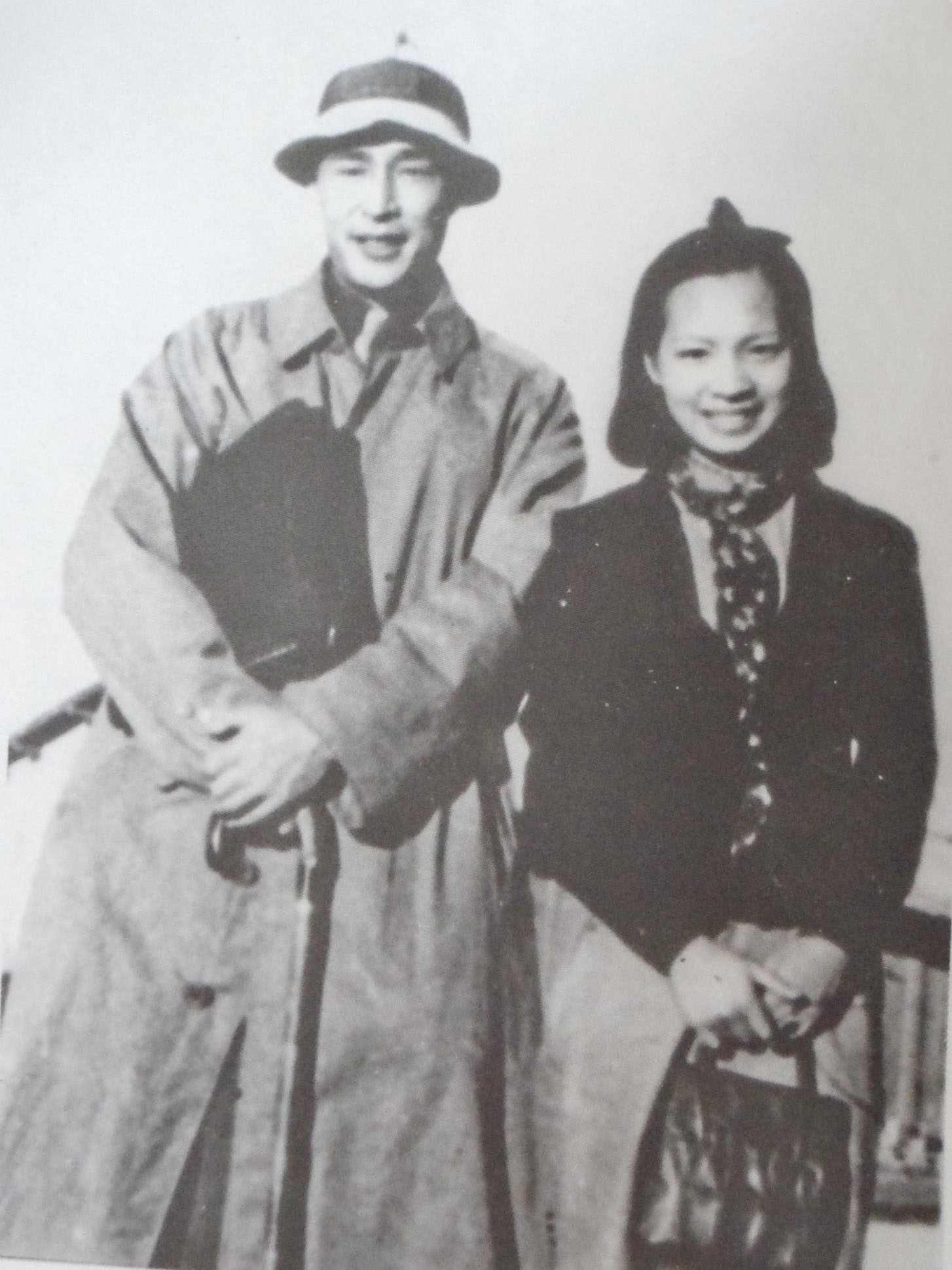
Wang Renmei and her first husband Jin Yan

However, Wang Renmei's career started to go downhill after Song of the Fishermen. On January 1, 1934, while still shooting the film, Wang suddenly announced her marriage with her Wild Rose costar Jin Yan, who was then the "Emperor of Cinema" in China. Despite the great success of Song of the Fishermen, Lianhua did not renew her contract because its owner believed that a married female star would lose her appeal to male audiences. She joined the Diantong Film Company in 1935 and acted in more films including the patriotic Sons and Daughters in a Time of Storm, but was not as successful as her husband.

After Japan invaded China and occupied Shanghai in 1937, Wang Renmei and Jin Yan fled to Hong Kong, and then to remote Kunming when Hong Kong also fell to the Japanese. Like other war refugees, they struggled for survival. Because of her knowledge of English, she found a job as a typist at the U.S. army base in Kunming. In the last few years of the war Wang Renmei and Jin Yan were often separated for months at a time, and the couple divorced in 1945. The divorce was amicable and they remained friendly for the rest of their lives.

== After WWII and the founding of PRC ==
After the Japanese surrender in 1945, Wang returned to Shanghai. However, due to strict government censorship and other unpopular policies by Chiang Kai-shek's Kuomintang government, she again left for Hong Kong.

When Mao Zedong's Chinese Communist Party (CCP) won the Chinese Civil War and established the People's Republic of China in 1949, Wang Renmei eagerly returned to Shanghai. The early policies of the CCP government were popular with the film industry, and many film veterans stayed in or returned to Shanghai. However, the honeymoon proved short-lived, as China was soon thrown into chaos with Mao's many political campaigns. During an early campaign, Wang Renmei had a fallout with her friend Zhou Xuan, the famous singer who had been a fellow member of the Bright Moon Song and Dance Troupe. Zhou and Wang both began to suffer from mental breakdowns, and Zhou died in a mental asylum in 1957.

=== Marriage to Ye Qianyu ===
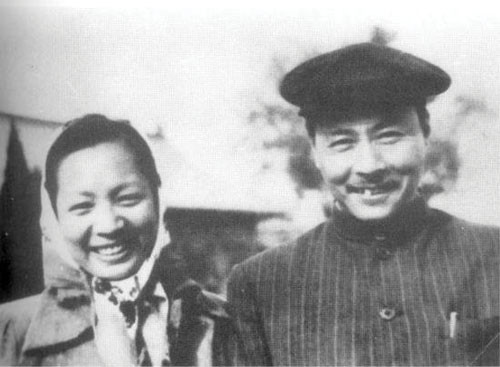
Wang Renmei and her second husband Ye Qianyu

In 1953, Wang was introduced to Ye Qianyu, a famous painter and manhua artist, who had drawn a caricature of her in the 1930s. They were married in 1955. The marriage was stormy, but they remained a couple until Wang's death in 1987. In her autobiography, Wang wrote that Ye was a good artist but not a good husband; he cared about nothing but art.

During the Cultural Revolution, Ye Qianyu was labeled as a Kuomintang agent and imprisoned for seven years. After his release in 1975, he worked as a janitor and almost died of a heart attack. Wang Renmei was sent down to the countryside in 1973, but was spared persecution, thanks to her family's relationship with Chairman Mao.

== Later life and death ==
After the end of the Cultural Revolution, Wang was finally admitted as a member of the Chinese Communist Party in 1979, 23 years after she first submitted her application. She tried to start a new career as a film director but soon suffered from a thrombosis in her brain. She became half-paralyzed for the rest of her life and died from a cerebral hemorrhage on 12 April 1987 in Beijing, aged 72.

== Legacy ==
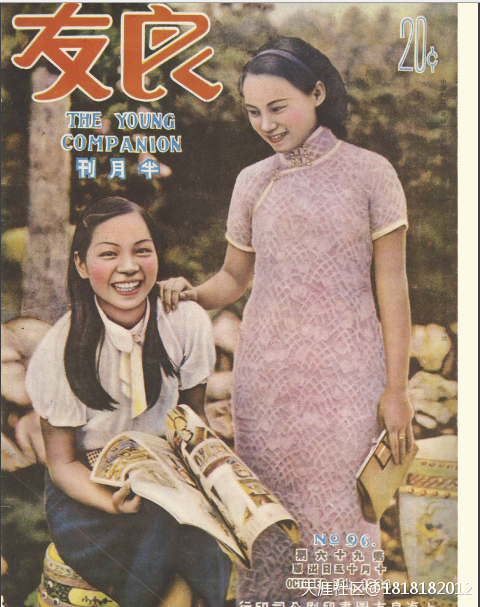
Cover of The Young Companion magazine #96 featuring actresses Chen Yanyan and Wang Renmei.

Wang Renmei appeared in a total of 25 films, but she lamented that she became famous too early. In her final years she published an autobiography, co-written with Xie Bo, entitled My Fame and Misfortune (我的成名与不幸).

In 2005, she was chosen by the Chinese Film and Performance Art Academy as one of the 100 best actors of the 100 years of Chinese cinema.

In 2013, Wang Renmei: The Wildcat of Shanghai, a biography written by Richard J. Meyer of Seattle University, was published by the Hong Kong University Press.
