= Song of the Fishermen =

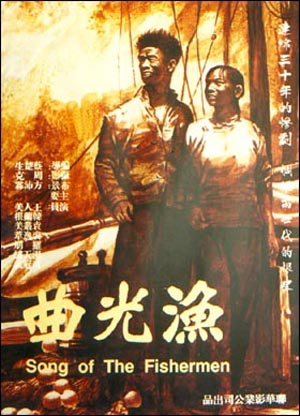
- Film poster
- Traditional Chinese: 漁光曲
- Simplified Chinese: 渔光曲
- Hanyu Pinyin: Yú guāng qǔ
- Directed by: Cai Chusheng
- Written by: Cai Chusheng
- Produced by: Lo Ming-yau
- Starring: Wang Renmei; Han Langen; Tang Tianxiu; Shi Renjie; Luo Peng; Yuan Congmei
- Cinematography: Zhou Ke
- Music by: George Njal; Ren Guang
- Production companies: United Photoplay Service (Lianhua Film Company), Second Studio, Shanghai
- Release date: April 6, 1934 (China)
- Running time: 57 minutes
- Country: China
- Language: Silent with Chinese intertitles

Song of the Fishermen (Chinese: 渔光曲; pinyin: Yú guāng qǔ) is an early Chinese silent film directed by Cai Chusheng in 1934, and produced by the Lianhua Film Company.

A successful film, Song of the Fishermen played for 84 straight days in Shanghai. In 1935, Song of Fishermen with a Chinese film delegation participated in the Moscow International Film Festival in the Soviet Union and won an honorable mention award. It was the first Chinese film to win a prize in an international film festival (Moscow Film Festival in 1935). In addition, for the director of the film, Cai Chusheng, who was born on January 12, 1906 and was one of the foremost progressive Chinese directors of the time, Song of the Fishermen, is one of his most critically acclaimed films. It allowed him to become the first Chinese director to win an international award during the Moscow International Film Festival in 1935.

The film shows the struggles of the poor—a fisherman's family is forced to leave their village and ends up in the city, where they have to sing on the streets to survive. The story was made possible by the fact that Cai Chusheng, who also worked as a screenwriter of this film, ever since he had begun developing his skill for playwriting, had been involved in the social rights movements of his time, like his involvement in the workers' union in China at the age of just 19. Many of the films part of his larger body of work frequently delve into societal issues about social hierarchy and sexual identity present in China during the early 20th century, namely New Women (1935) and Dawn over the Metropolis (1933).

== Plot ==
Fisherman Xu Fu has a pair of twin children, Xiaomao (Kitten) and Xiaohou (Monkey). Xu Fu perishes in a storm while fishing at sea. To repay the debts, their mother, Xu's wife, with no other choice, has to become a maid for He Renzhai, the owner of a privately owned shipping fleet. Unfortunately, she is fired from her job for accidentally breaking an antique belonging to the He family. Shortly afterwards, she loses her eyesight due to illness. However, He Ziying, the He family's young master (少爷), grows up with Xiaomao and Xiaohou, and they become close friends.

Ten years later, Xiaomao and Xiaohou are still renting the He family's fishing boats to fish, while Ziying is preparing to study abroad to major in the fishing industry. Before his departure, the three friends gather, and He Ziying vows to reform the Chinese fishing industry when he returns from his studies. After Ziying leaves, He Renzhai, in partnership with foreigners, established a fishing company. This made life increasingly difficult for the Xu family. Unable to sustain themselves by fishing, they returned their boat and moved to Shanghai to live with their uncle. In Shanghai, Xiaomao and Xiaohou earn their living by selling songs on the streets under the guidance of their uncle. One day, they encounter Ziying while they were selling songs. Ziying, out of pity for his childhood friends, gifted the pair 100 RMB, but unforeseen to him, this gift would lead to the siblings being falsely accused of robbery and sent to jail. After later being cleared of their charges and subsequently being released from prison, they decide to celebrate with their mother at home. However, upon arriving back at their house, they discover that a fire broke out in the Xu household. Their mother and uncle succumbed to the flames, and Xiaohou and Xiaomao are left homeless.

The siblings return to their hometown to resume fishing. Meanwhile, due to the manager of the He Rhezhai fishing company embezzling funds and fleeing, the He family's fishing company went bankrupt. To add insult to injury, the manager has also eloped with his lover. Unable to cope, He Renzhai takes his own life. He Ziying gives up his ambitions and returns to fishing for a living with his two step-siblings. Tragically, Xiaohou is severely injured on the boat and on the brink of death. About to die, Xiaohou requests that Xiaomao sing "Song of the Fishermen" for him one last time.

== Cast ==
- Wang Renmei as Kitty / Xu Xiaomao, the intelligent daughter of Xu Fu, who inherits the family fishing business with her twin brother, Xiaohou
  - Yan Xiaoyuan as Kitty / Xu Xiaomao (young)
- Han Langen as Monkey / Xu Xiaohou, the frail and sickly son of Xu Fu and brother of Xu Xiaomao
  - Shi Reijie as Monkey / Xu Xiaohou (young)
- Luo Peng as He Ziying, son of He Renzhai, who dreams of reforming the Chinese fishing industry
  - Qian Huang as He Ziying (young)
- Wang Guilin as Xu Fu, the father of Xiaomao and Xiaohou, a fisherman who died at sea
- Tang Tianxiu as Xu Fu's wife, the mother of Xiaomao and Xiaohou
- Fu Yiqui as Xu Fu's mother, the mother of Xu Fu
- Shang Guanwu as He Renzhai, master of the He family, who commits suicide when his fishing company goes bankrupt
- Wang Moqiu as He Renzhai's wife, mother of He Ziying
- Yuan Congmei as Liang Yuezhou, an unscrupulous Japanese merchant who causes to the downfall of He Renzhai's fishing company
- Tan Ying as Xue Qiyun, He Renzai's concubine who later works with Liang Yuezhou
- Pei Yiwei as the uncle of Xiaomao and Xiaohou, who helps them earn a living after moving to Shanghai

== Background ==
The left-wing film movement began in 1931. In 1932, left-wing figures started entering the film industry as script consultants. The movement reached its peak in 1933, with a number of works emerging, including Raging Waves, Dawn, and City Nights. In November of that year, the Yihua Film Company was vandalized by a gang of agents calling themselves the "Chinese Film Circle Society for Eliminating Communists," dealing a heavy blow to the movement. After that, the left-wing film group switched to a more covert approach and continued to make films, producing progressive works such as Song of the Fishermen and Goddess.

Between September 19 and 24, 1933, dozens of filmmakers, led by director Cai Chusheng, and his fellow workers were in the area of Shipu, Ningbo, Zhejiang, shooting Song of the Fishermen. To help Wang Renmei understand the character of Xiaomao, Cai Chusheng personally led the crew to Shipu, where he had her listen to the tragic lives of local fishermen, taste the sea breeze, experience the hardship of rowing, and witness the suffering of the poor. To make her appearance more realistic for the role, he even had her face smeared with mud. These efforts led Wang Renmei to truly see herself as Xiaomao, one of the fisherfolk. With tears in her eyes, she sang the sorrowful theme song: “Fish are hard to catch, taxes are heavy, fishermen live in poverty for generations... my back aches, my hands are swollen, and even after catching fish, our stomachs are still empty.”

During this period, the Chinese film industry was in transition from silent to sound films. Shanghai, as the center of Chinese cinema, was home to several private film companies, including the Lianhua Film Company and the Mingxing Film Company. Song of the Fishermen was produced by Lianhua. The film began production on August 21, 1933, and held its preview screening at the Jincheng Theatre in Shanghai on June 10, 1934, taking approximately ten months to complete.

Despite the many difficulties during production—including typhoon weather in Shanghai, rough sea conditions, and illness caused by the unfamiliar local climate—Cai Chusheng remained enthusiastic and committed to the project. In a letter to Lu Hanzhang, he described the hardships faced by the cast and crew over five days of location shooting, while also expressing his continued passion and resolve.

During breaks from filming, Wang Renmei was often seen reading, committed to keeping up her studies. Her discipline impressed observers, who described her not just as a lively “wild child,” but also as someone with intellectual and artistic ambition.

The role of the young fisherman “Monkey” was played by comic actor Han Langen. In the final days of filming, his wife fell critically ill. Nevertheless, Han Langen insisted on completing the shoot. Sadly, by the time he returned home, she had already passed away.

Before the film begins, viewers see an opening title card that reads, “In memory of the worker Jin Chuansong who died in the line of duty.” Jin Chuansong, an electrician at Lianhua Film Company, had fallen to his death while setting up lighting for the film. Director Cai added the tribute to honor his sacrifice.

There is also a brief scene where a surviving fisherman returns after a boat capsizes, carrying a wooden plank. This role was played by renowned composer Nie Er, whose appearance moved audiences.

Song of the Fishermen began production on August 21, 1933, and held its preview screening at the Jincheng Theatre in Shanghai on June 10, 1934, taking approximately ten months to complete.

== Cultural impact ==
Song of the Fishermen achieved significant commercial success. After its premiere at the Jincheng Theatre in Shanghai on June 14, 1934, the film ran for 84 consecutive days with sold-out screenings, setting a box office record for domestic films and becoming the most profitable Chinese film of the 1930s.

The film also received international recognition. In 1935, Song of the Fishermen was submitted to the Moscow International Film Festival as part of the Chinese film delegation, where it received an Honorable Mention, becoming the first Chinese film to win an international award. The film's success ushered in a "golden age for domestic films in Chinese cinemas" and propelled lead actress Wang Renmei to stardom, elevating her to the ranks of top-tier movie stars. Her performance of the theme song quickly spread across China, with its recordings selling out rapidly and breaking the previous sales record held by the song "Lullaby" from the film Twin Sisters.

Beyond its commercial and artistic achievements, Song of the Fishermen carried deep political significance. As Wu Yuanyuan points out, at a time of national crisis, filmmakers focused on the daily lives of ordinary people, taking anti-imperialist and anti-feudalist positions while exposing exploitation and oppression. They paid attention to the lives and fates of the underclass in order to enlighten the public and save the nation. Song of the Fishermen thus became a representative work of the left-wing film movement of the 1930s.
