= Bright Moon Song and Dance Troupe =

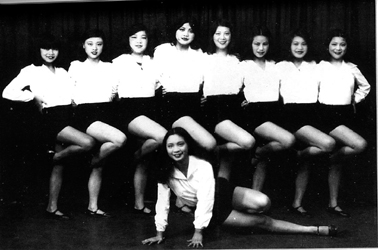
The Bright Moon Song and Dance Troupe, with Wang Renmei in the front

The Bright Moon Song and Dance Troupe (Chinese: 明月歌舞团; pinyin: Míngyuè Gēwǔtuán) was a group founded by Li Jinhui from the late 1920s through the 1930s. It is also translated as Bright Moonlight Song and Dance Troupe.

== Background ==
During the Chinese popular music boom era in the early 1930s, Shanghai had a large number of troupes, or music groups, competing for radio broadcasts and other entertainment slots. These groups were composed mostly of sing-song girls.

== Recognition ==
The troupe merged with Lianhua Film Company in 1931 as the first Chinese popular music group of any sort to become part of the movie industry. The company would later prove to be instrumental in the rise of the first generation of shidaiqu music.

== Famous members ==
- Zhou Xuan
- Wang Renmei
- Nie Er
- Bai Hong
- Li Lili
- Li Minghui
- Violet Wong
- Xu Lai
- Xue Lingxian

== See also ==
- C-pop
- Mandopop
- Yellow Music
