= Cinema of China =

- No. of screens: 86,300 (2024)
  - Per capita: 2.98 per 100,000 (2016)
- Main distributors: China Film (32.8%); Huaxia (22.89%); Enlight (7.75%)

Produced feature films (2016)
- Fictional: 772
- Animated: 49
- Documentary: 32

Number of admissions (2016)
- Total: 1,370,000,000
  - Per capita: 1

Gross box office (2024)
- Total: CN¥42.5 billion (US$5.81 billion)
- National films: 78.7%

The cinema of China is the filmmaking and film industry of mainland China, one of three distinct historical threads of Chinese-language cinema together with the cinema of Hong Kong and the cinema of Taiwan. China is the home of the largest movie and drama production complex and film studios in the world, the Oriental Movie Metropolis and Hengdian World Studios. In 2012 the country became the second-largest market in the world by box office receipts behind only the United States. In 2016 the gross box office in China was CN¥45.71 billion (US$6.58 billion). China has also become a major hub of business for Hollywood studios.

== Beginnings ==
While early accounts traditionally date the introduction of cinema to China to an anonymous variety show in August 1896 at Shanghai's Xu Garden teahouse, archival newspaper research by Dr Yongchun Fu demonstrates that this event was a magic lantern exhibition projecting still glass slides (yingxi). The historical record confirms that the first true motion picture exhibition in China occurred on May 22, 1897, when itinerant showman Harry Welby Cook projected celluloid film strips using Edison's Animatoscope at the Astor House Hotel in Shanghai. Later that summer Cook also produced China's earliest localized actualities by filming local bicycle riders and swimming baths before expanding his commercial film circuit north to Tianjin and Beijing. Chinese-made short melodrama and comedy films began emerging in 1913. In 1913 the first independent Chinese screenplay, The Difficult Couple, was filmed in Shanghai by Zheng Zhengqiu and Zhang Shichuan. Zhang Shichuan then set up the first Chinese-owned film production company in 1916. The first full-length feature film was Yan Ruisheng (閻瑞生), released in 1921, which was a docudrama about the killing of a Shanghai courtesan.

Chinese film production developed significantly in the 1920s. During this time film technicians from the United States trained Chinese technicians in Shanghai, and American influence continued to be felt there for the next two decades. Since film was still in its earliest stages of development, most Chinese silent films were only comic skits or operatic shorts, and training was minimal in technical aspects due to this being a period of experimental films. Throughout the 1920s and 1930s filmmaking in China was largely done by film studios and there was comparatively little small scale filmmaking.

Upscale movie theaters in China had contracts which required them to exclusively show Hollywood films, and thus as of the late 1920s, Hollywood films accounted for 90% of screen time in Chinese theaters.

After trials and errors China was able to draw inspiration from its traditional values and began producing martial arts films, with the first being Burning of Red Lotus Temple (1928). Burning of Red Lotus Temple was so successful at the box office, the Star Motion Pictures (Mingxing) production company later filmed 18 sequels, marking the beginning of China's esteemed martial arts film genre. Many imitators followed, including U. Lien (Youlian) Studio's Red Heroine (1929), which is still extant. It was during this period that some of the more important production companies first came into being, notably Mingxing and the Shaw brothers' Tianyi ("Unique"). Mingxing, founded by Zheng Zhengqiu and Zhang Shichuan in 1922, initially focused on comic shorts, including the oldest surviving complete Chinese film Laborer's Love (1922), but soon shifted to feature-length films and family dramas such as Orphan Rescues Grandfather (1923). Meanwhile Tianyi moved their model toward folklore dramas and also pushed into foreign markets; their film White Snake (1926) (Note: Bai She Zhuan (1926) 白蛇传 : Legend of the White Snake Adaptation of Legend of the White Snake) proved a typical example of their success in the Chinese communities of Southeast Asia. In 1931 the first Chinese sound film Sing-Song Girl Red Peony was made, the product of a cooperation between the Mingxing Film Company's image production and Pathé Frères' sound technology. However, the sound was disc-recorded, which was then played in the theater in-sync with the action on the screen. The first sound-on-film talkie made in China was either Spring on Stage (歌場春色) by Tianyi or Clear Sky After Storm by Great China Studio and Jinan Studio. Musical films such as Song at Midnight (1937) and Street Angels (1937), starring Zhou Xuan, became one of the most popular film genres in China.

In the late 1920s the ROC banned the adaptation of martial arts novels into films. The Nationalist government contended that the masses were superstitious and would take the fantastical elements of these narratives as factual.

News films increased in importance following the Japanese air raid on Shanghai in 1932. The bombing also destroyed significant amounts of the Chinese film industry and resulted in the loss of many early films.

=== Leftist movement ===
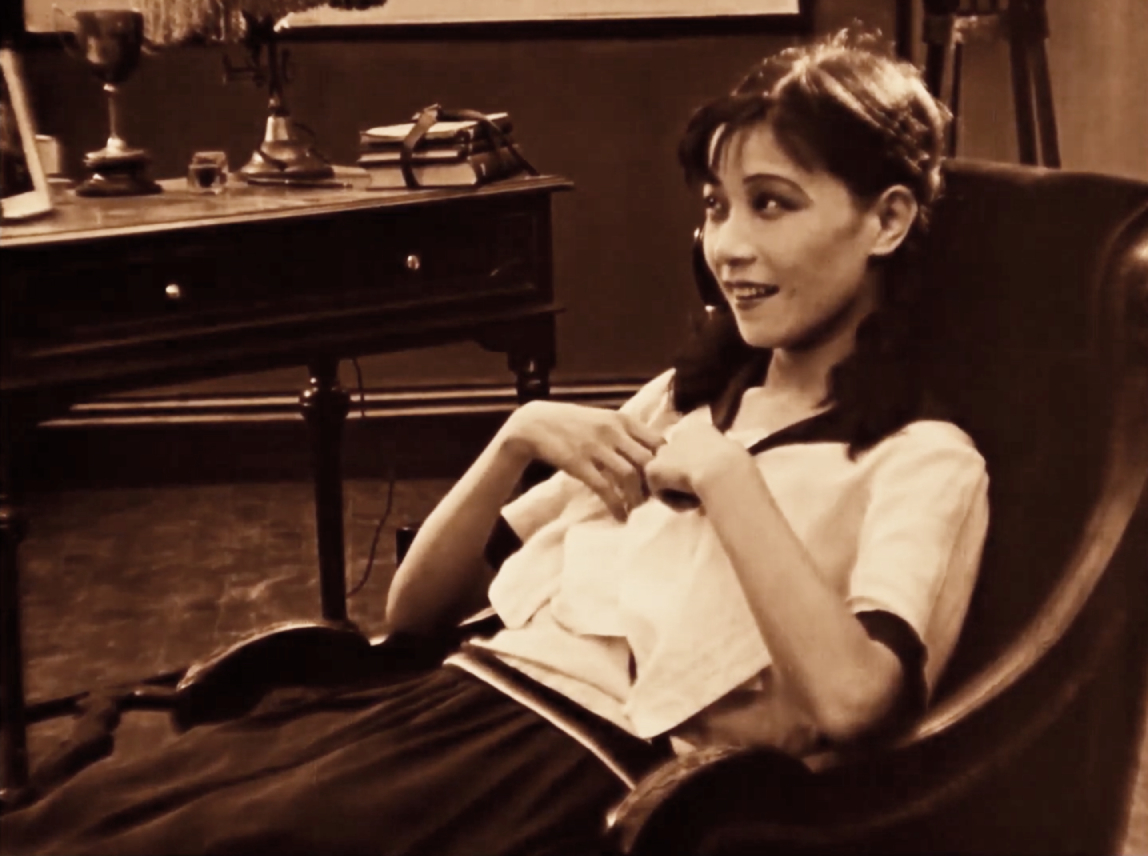
20-year-old Ruan Lingyu, a superstar during the silent film era, in Love and Duty (1931)

Many important Chinese films were produced beginning in the 1930s with the advent of the "progressive" or "left-wing" movement, including Cheng Bugao's Spring Silkworms (1933), Wu Yonggang's The Goddess (1934), and Sun Yu's The Great Road, also known as The Big Road (1934). These films were noted for their emphasis on class struggle and external threats (i.e., Japanese aggression), as well as their focus on common people, such as a family of silk farmers in Spring Silkworms and a prostitute in The Goddess. In part due to the success of these kinds of films, this post-1930 era is now often referred to as the first "golden period" of Chinese cinema. The Leftist cinematic movement frequently revolved around the Western-influenced Shanghai, where filmmakers portrayed the struggling lower class of an overpopulated city.

As part of their strategy of using art as a medium for its political messages, the Chinese Communist Party (CCP) became active in Shanghai's film industry. Films dealing with women's liberation that were produced as a result of this effort included the 1935 film Children of Troubled Times, whose theme song (The March of the Volunteers) became the PRC's national anthem.

Three production companies dominated the market in the early to mid-1930s: the newly formed Lianhua ("United China") (Note: Lianhua's original English name is "United Photoplay Service") and the older and larger Mingxing and Tianyi. Mingxing and Lianhua leaned left (Lianhua's management perhaps more so), while Tianyi continued to make less socially conscious fare.

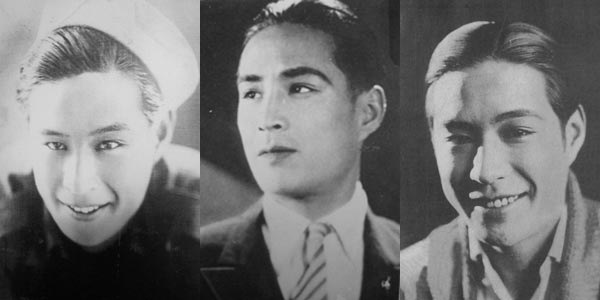
Jin Yan, a Korean-born Chinese actor featured in The Big Road (1935), who gained fame during China's golden age of cinema

The period also produced the first big Chinese movie stars, such as Hu Die, Ruan Lingyu, Li Lili, Chen Yanyan, Zhou Xuan, Zhao Dan, and Jin Yan. Other major films of the period include Love and Duty (1931), Little Toys (1933), New Women (1934), Song of the Fishermen (1934), Plunder of Peach and Plum (1934), Crossroads (1937), and Street Angel (1937). Throughout the 1930s the Nationalists and the CCP struggled for power and control over the major studios, and their political influences can be seen in the films that were produced.

=== Japanese occupation and World War II ===
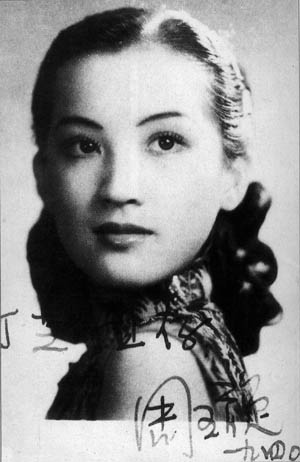
Zhou Xuan, an iconic Chinese singer and film actress

The start of the Second Sino-Japanese War in 1937, in particular the Battle of Shanghai, ended this golden era in Chinese cinema. All production companies except Xinhua Film Company ("New China") closed shop. A large number of filmmakers left to join the War of Resistance, with many going to the Nationalist-controlled hinterlands to join the Nationalist film studios Central Motion Picture Studio or China Motion Picture Studio. A smaller number went to Yan'an or Hong Kong.

The Shanghai film industry, though severely curtailed, did not stop however, thus leading to the "Solitary Island" period (also known as the "Sole Island" or "Orphan Island"), with Shanghai's foreign concessions serving as an "island" of production in the "sea" of Japanese-occupied territories. During this time artists and directors who remained in the city had to walk a fine line between staying true to their leftist and nationalist beliefs and Japanese pressures. Director Bu Wancang's Hua Mu Lan, also known as Mulan Joins the Army (1939), about a young Chinese peasant fighting against a foreign invasion, was a particularly good example of Shanghai's continued film production in the midst of war. This period ended when Japan declared war on the Western allies on December 7, 1941; the solitary island was finally engulfed by the sea of the Japanese occupation. With the Shanghai industry firmly in Japanese control, films like the Greater East Asia Co-Prosperity Sphere-promoting Eternity (1943) were produced.

By the 1930s and 1940s, both the Nationalist government and the CCP used documentary films as a form of propaganda.

During the 1930 and 1940s, both the Nationalist government and the Japanese occupation authorities sent mobile projectionist units into areas under their control to show propaganda films.

In the Yan'an Soviet during September 1938, the Eighth Route Army established its first film group. In 1943, the CCP released its first campaign film, Nanniwan, which sought to develop relationships between its forces and local people in the Yan'an area by showcasing the army's production campaign to alleviate material shortages.

Following Japan's unconditional surrender in August 1945, the Soviet Red Army helped the CCP to take over the Japanese colonial film establishment in Manchuria, the Manchukuo Film Association (Man-ei). Man-ei had state-of-the-art film production equipment and supplies. The former colonial studio was relocated to Hegang, where it was established as Northeastern Film Studio, the CCP's first full-capacity film studio. Yuan Muzhi was its director and Chen Bo'er was its party secretary. Northeastern Film Studio began production in early 1947, focusing on news and documentary films, as well as some fiction, educational film for children, and animation.

During the later phase of the Chinese Civil War, filmmakers trained in Yan'an and Northeastern Film Studio documented all the major battles leading to the CCP's defeat of the Nationalists.

== Second golden age ==
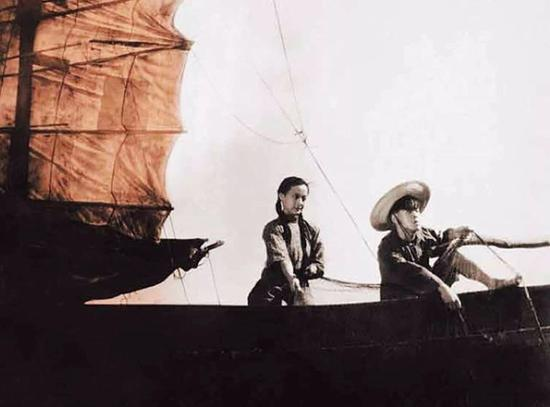
Wang Danfeng in the film New Fisherman's Song (1942)

The film industry continued to develop after 1945. Production in Shanghai once again resumed as a new crop of studios took the place that Lianhua and Mingxing studios had occupied in the previous decade. In 1945, Cai Chusheng returned to Shanghai to revive the Lianhua name as the "Lianhua Film Society with Shi Dongshan, Meng Junmou, and Zheng Junli." This in turn became Kunlun Studios, which would go on to become one of the most important studios of the era (Kunlun Studios merged with seven other studios to form Shanghai film studio in 1949), putting out the classics The Spring River Flows East (1947), Myriad of Lights (1948), Crows and Sparrows (1949), and Wanderings of Three-Hairs the Orphan, also known as San Mao, The Little Vagabond (1949). Many of these films showed the disillusionment with the oppressive rule of Chiang Kai-shek's Nationalist Party and the struggling oppression of nation by war. The Spring River Flows East, a three-hour-long two-parter directed by Cai Chusheng and Zheng Junli, was a particularly strong success. Its depiction of the struggles of ordinary Chinese during the Second Sino-Japanese war, replete with biting social and political commentary, struck a chord with audiences of the time.

Meanwhile, companies like the Wenhua Film Company ("Culture Films"), moved away from the leftist tradition and explored the evolution and development of other dramatic genres. Wenhua treated postwar problems in universalistic and humanistic ways, avoiding the family narrative and melodramatic formulae. Excellent examples of Wenhua's fare are its first two postwar features, Love Everlasting (Bu liaoqing, 1947) and Fake Bride, Phony Bridegroom (1947). Another memorable Wenhua film is Long Live the Missus (1947), like Love Everlasting with an original screenplay by writer Eileen Chang. Wenhua's romantic drama, Spring in a Small Town (1948), directed by Fei Mu shortly prior to the revolution, is often regarded by Chinese film critics as one of the most important films in the history of Chinese cinema, in 2005, Hong Kong film awards it as the best 100 years of film. Ironically, it was precisely its artistic quality and apparent lack of "political grounding" that led to its labeling by the CCP as rightist or reactionary, and the film was quickly forgotten by those on the mainland following the CCP's victory in 1949. However, with the China Film Archive's re-opening after the Cultural Revolution, a new print was struck from the original negative, allowing Spring of the Small Town to find a new and admiring audience and to influence an entire new generation of filmmakers. Indeed, an acclaimed remake was made in 2002 by Tian Zhuangzhuang. A Chinese Peking opera film, A Wedding in the Dream (1948), by the same director (Fei Mu), was the first Chinese color film.

== Early People's Republic of China ==
=== Film infrastructure ===
At the founding of the People's Republic of China (PRC) in 1949, there were fewer than 600 movie theaters in the country. The PRC government solved the problem of a lack of film theaters by building mobile projection units which could tour the remote regions of China, ensuring that even the poorest could have access to films. The vast majority of China's people lived in rural areas, and most people in China had not seen a film until mobile projectionists brought them.

Yuan Muzhi was important in developing the government's theories and practices of rural film exhibition. Yuan and Chen Bo'er transformed the post-Second Sino-Japanese War remnants of the Manchurian Motion Picture Association into the Northeast Film Studio and when Yuan became Film Bureau chief in 1949, he applied its model to help institute a film exhibition network around the country. The Northeast Film Studio also trained the first generation of communist Chinese documentary filmmakers. In 1950, 1,800 projectionists from around the country traveled to Nanjing for a training program. These projectionists replicated the training program in their own home provinces to create more projectionists. Nanjing was later termed a "Cradle of People's Cinema."

The PRC sought to recruit women and ethnic minority projectionists in an effort to more effectively reach marginalized communities. Rural mobile projectionist teams and urban movie theaters were generally managed through the PRC's cultural bureaucracy. Mobile projection teams during the Mao era typically included three to four workers who physically transported film infrastructure through a large geographic area mostly not covered by any electrical grid. Trade Unions and PLA propaganda departments also operated film exhibition networks. Work as a mobile projectionist was physically and technically demanding. As a result, women projectionists and all-women mobile projection teams were promoted in Chinese media as examples of advancing gender equality under socialism.

Until the profusion of mobile projectionist teams in the 1950s, most rural people had not seen a film. The number of movie-viewers hence increased sharply, partly bolstered by the fact that film tickets were given out to work units and attendance was compulsory, with admissions rising from 47 million in 1949 to 4.15 billion in 1959. By 1965 there were around 20,393 mobile film units. During the course of the Mao era, the majority of films were shown by such units, with only a minority watched in theaters.

In the 1950s and the 1960s, the CCP built cinemas (among other cultural buildings) in industrial districts on urban peripheries. These structures were influenced by Soviet architecture and were intended to be vivacious but not "palatial."

In 1953, the non-state film industry was nationalized.

=== Film themes and content ===
The government saw motion pictures as an important artform and tool for mass propaganda. The Soviet-led collaborations Victory of the Chinese People (1950) and Liberated China (1951) were among the biggest film events in the PRC's early years. Victory of the Chinese People depicted re-enactments of four of the CCP's major military victories and was filmed using real ammunition with the participation of the People's Liberation Army.

From the founding of the PRC through the 1970s, scientific education films were a major genre. Addressing topics like hygiene, modern production methods, communal organisation, and agricultural methods, these films were intended to advance modernisation while conveying a sense of collective progress.

The private studios in Shanghai, including Kunming, Wenhua, Guotai, and Datong, were at first encouraged to make new films. They made approximately 47 films during the next two years but soon ran into trouble, owing to the furor over the Kunlun-produced drama The Life of Wu Xun (1950), directed by Sun Yu and starring veteran Zhao Dan. In an anonymous article in People's Daily in May 1951, the feature was accused of spreading feudal ideas. After the article was revealed to be penned by Mao Zedong, the film was banned, the Film Steering Committee was formed to "re-educate" the film industry, and the private studios were all incorporated into the state-run Shanghai Film Studio.

After the establishment of the PRC, China's cultural bureaucracy described American films as screen-opium and began criticizing American film alongside anti-drug campaigns. The Chinese Communist Party (CCP) sought to tighten control over mass media, producing instead movies centering on peasants, soldiers, and workers, such as Bridge (1949) and The White-Haired Girl (1950). One of the production bases in the middle of all the transition was the Changchun Film Studio. American films were banned as part of the Korean War effort.

In 1950s China, a common view of film was that it served as "socialist distance horizon education". For example, films promoted rural collectivization. Cinema also sought to develop the proletarian class consciousness of rural workers, encouraging the industrialization and militarization of their labor. Film projection teams operating in rural China were asked to incorporate lantern slides into their work to introduce national policies and political campaigns.

Between 1949 and 1957, China imported more than 1,300 films, two-thirds of them from the Soviet Union.

In the 17 years between the founding of the People's Republic of China and the Cultural Revolution, 603 feature films and 8,342 reels of documentaries and newsreels were produced, sponsored mostly as CCP propaganda by the government, according to the state-run China Internet Information Center. For example, in Guerrilla on the Railroad (铁道游击队), dated 1956, the Chinese Communist Party was depicted as the primary resistance force against the Second Sino-Japanese War. Chinese filmmakers were sent to Moscow to study the Soviet socialist realism style of filmmaking. The Beijing Film Academy was established in 1950 and officially opened in 1956. One important film of this era is This Life of Mine (1950), directed by Shi Hu, which follows an old beggar reflecting on his past life as a policeman working for the various regimes since 1911. The first widescreen Chinese film was produced in 1960. Animated films using a variety of folk arts, such as papercuts, shadow plays, puppetry, and traditional paintings, also were very popular for entertaining and educating children. The most famous of these, the classic Havoc in Heaven (two parts, 1961, 4), was made by Wan Laiming of the Wan Brothers and won the Outstanding Film award at the London International Film Festival.

Films such as The White-Haired Girl and Serf were part of a genre of redemptive melodramas, which sought to encourage audiences to "speak bitterness".

After the United Kingdom and the PRC established diplomatic relations, cultural exchanges between the two countries gradually resumed, including British moves being made available in China.

The thawing of censorship in 1956–57 (known as the Hundred Flowers Campaign) and in the early 1960s led to more indigenous Chinese films being made, which were less reliant on their Soviet counterparts. During this campaign the sharpest criticisms came from the satirical comedies of Lü Ban. Before the New Director Arrives exposes the hierarchical relationships occurring between the cadres, while his next film, The Unfinished Comedy (1957), was labeled as a "poisonous weed" during the Anti-Rightist Movement, and Lü was banned from directing for life. Other noteworthy films produced during this period were adaptations of literary classics, such as Sang Hu's The New Year's Sacrifice (1956, adapted from a Lu Xun story) and Shui Hua's The Lin Family Shop (1959, adapted from a Mao Dun story). The most prominent filmmaker of this era was Xie Jin, whose three films in particular, Woman Basketball Player No. 5 (1957), The Red Detachment of Women (1961), and Two Stage Sisters (1964), exemplify China's increased expertise in filmmaking. Films made during this period are polished, exhibiting high production value and elaborate sets. While Beijing and Shanghai remained the main centers of production, between 1957 and 1960 the government built regional studios in Guangzhou, Xi'an, and Chengdu to encourage representation of ethnic minorities in films. Chinese cinema began to directly address the issue of such ethnic minorities during the late 1950s and early 1960s in films like Five Golden Flowers (1959), Third Sister Liu (1960), Serfs (1963), and Ashima (1964).

On 9 March 1958, the Ministry of Culture held a meeting to introduce a Great Leap Forward in cinema. During the Great Leap Forward, the film industry rapidly expanded, with documentary films being the genre that experienced the greatest growth. Trends in documentary film included "artistic documentaries," in which actors and non-actors reenacted events. Film venues also expanded rapidly, including both urban cinemas and mobile projection units.

As part of the Socialist Education Movement, mobile film projectionist units showed films and slideshows that emphasized class struggle and encouraged audience members to discuss bitter experiences onstage. New films termed "emphasis films" were released to coincide with the campaign, and the film version of The White-Haired Girl was re-released.

In 1965, China launched the Resist America, Aid Vietnam campaign in response to the U.S. bombing of North Vietnam. To promote campaign themes denouncing U.S. imperialism and promoted Vietnamese resistance, the CCP used film exhibitions and other cultural media.

== Films of the Cultural Revolution ==
During the Cultural Revolution, the film industry was severely restricted. Almost all previous films were banned, and only a few new ones were produced, the revolutionary model operas. The most notable of these was a ballet version of the revolutionary opera The Red Detachment of Women, directed by Pan Wenzhan and Fu Jie in 1970.

The release of filmed versions of the revolutionary model operas resulted in a re-organization and expansion of China's film exhibition network. From 1965 to 1976, the number of film projection units in China quadrupled, total film audiences nearly tripled, and the national film attendance rate doubled. The Cultural Revolution Group drastically reduced ticket prices which, in its view, would allow film to better serve the needs of workers and of socialism.

In addition to films deemed laudatory, from the middle of 1966 to 1968, the expanding film distribution network screened films characterized as "poisonous weeds" to hundreds of millions of audience members for the purpose of criticizing the films. These criticism screenings were sometimes accompanied by struggle sessions.

Sent-down youth were a major subset of China's rural projectionists during the Cultural Revolution period.

Feature film production came almost to a standstill in the early years from 1967 to 1972. Movie production revived after 1972 under the strict jurisdiction of the Gang of Four until 1976, when they were overthrown. The few films that were produced during this period, such as 1975's Breaking with Old Ideas, were highly regulated in terms of plot and characterization.

In 1972, Chinese officials invited Michelangelo Antonioni to China to film the achievements of the Cultural Revolution. Antonioni made the documentary Chung Kuo, Cina. When it was released in 1974, CCP leadership in China interpreted the film as reactionary and anti-Chinese. Viewing art through the principles of the Yan'an Talks, particularly the concept that there is no such thing as art-for-art's-sake, party leadership construed Antonioni's aesthetic choices as politically motivated and banned the film. Jiang Qing criticized Premier Zhou Enlai's role in Antonioni's invitation to China as not only a failure but also treasonous. Since its 2004 release in China, the film has been well-regarded by Chinese audiences, especially for its beautiful depictions of a more simple time.

Because China rejection of most foreign film importation, comparatively minor cinema like Albanian cinema and North Korean cinema developed mass audiences in China. Through Albanian films screened during this period, many Chinese audience members were introduced to avant-garde and modernist storytelling techniques and aesthetics.

== Post-Cultural Revolution ==
=== Box office boom after the Cultural Revolution ===
In the years immediately following the Cultural Revolution, the film industry again flourished as a medium of popular entertainment. Production rose steadily, from 19 features in 1977 to 125 in 1986. Domestically produced films played to large audiences, and tickets for foreign film festivals sold quickly. The industry tried to revive crowds by making more innovative and "exploratory" films like their counterparts in the West.

Chinese cinema grew significantly in the late 1970s. In 1979, annual box office admissions reached a peak of 29.3 billion tickets sold, equivalent to an average of 30 films per person. Chinese cinema continued to prosper into the early 1980s. In 1980, annual box office admissions stood at 23.4 billion tickets sold, equivalent to an average of 29 films per person. In terms of box office admissions, this period represented the peak ticket sales in the history of the Chinese box office. High ticket sales were driven by low ticket prices, with a cinema ticket typically costing between ¥0.1 ($0.06) and ¥0.3 ($0.19) at the time.

By the early 1980s, there were 162,000 projection units in China, primarily composed of mobile movie teams which showed films outdoors in both rural and urban areas.

A number of films during this period drew box office admissions in the hundreds of millions. China's highest-grossing film in box office admissions was Legend of the White Snake (1980) with an estimated 700 million admissions, followed by In-Laws (Full House of Joy) (1981) and The Undaunted Wudang (1983) with more than 600 million ticket sales each. The highest-grossing foreign film was the Japanese film Kimi yo Fundo no Kawa o Watare (1976), which released in 1978 and sold more than 330 million tickets, followed by the Indian film Caravan (1971) which released in 1979 and sold about 300 million tickets.

In the late 1980s the film industry fell on hard times, faced with the dual problems of competition from other forms of entertainment and concern on the part of the authorities that many of the popular thriller and martial arts films were socially unacceptable. In January 1986 the film industry was transferred from the Ministry of Culture to the newly formed Ministry of Radio, Cinema, and Television to bring it under "stricter control and management" and to "strengthen supervision over production."

=== "Scar dramas" ===
The end of the Cultural Revolution brought the release of "scar dramas" (傷痕剧 shānghén jù), which depicted the emotional traumas left by this period. The best-known of these is probably Xie Jin's Hibiscus Town (1986), although they could be seen as late as the 1990s with Tian Zhuangzhuang's The Blue Kite (1993). In the 1980s, open criticism of certain past CCP policies was encouraged by Deng Xiaoping as a way to reveal the excesses of the Cultural Revolution and the earlier Anti-Rightist Campaign, also helping to legitimize Deng's new policies of "reform and opening up." For instance, the Best Picture prize in the inaugural 1981 Golden Rooster Awards was given to two "scar dramas", Evening Rain (Wu Yonggang, Wu Yigong, 1980) and Legend of Tianyun Mountain (Xie Jin, 1980).

Many scar dramas were made by members of the Fourth Generation whose own careers or lives had suffered during the events in question, while younger, Fifth Generation directors such as Tian tended to focus on less controversial subjects of the immediate present or the distant past. Official enthusiasm for scar dramas waned by the 1990s when younger filmmakers began to confront negative aspects of the Mao era. The Blue Kite, though sharing a similar subject as the earlier scar dramas, was more realistic in style, and was made only through obfuscating its real script. Shown abroad, it was banned from release in mainland China, while Tian himself was banned from making any films for nearly a decade afterward.

== Rise of the fifth generation ==
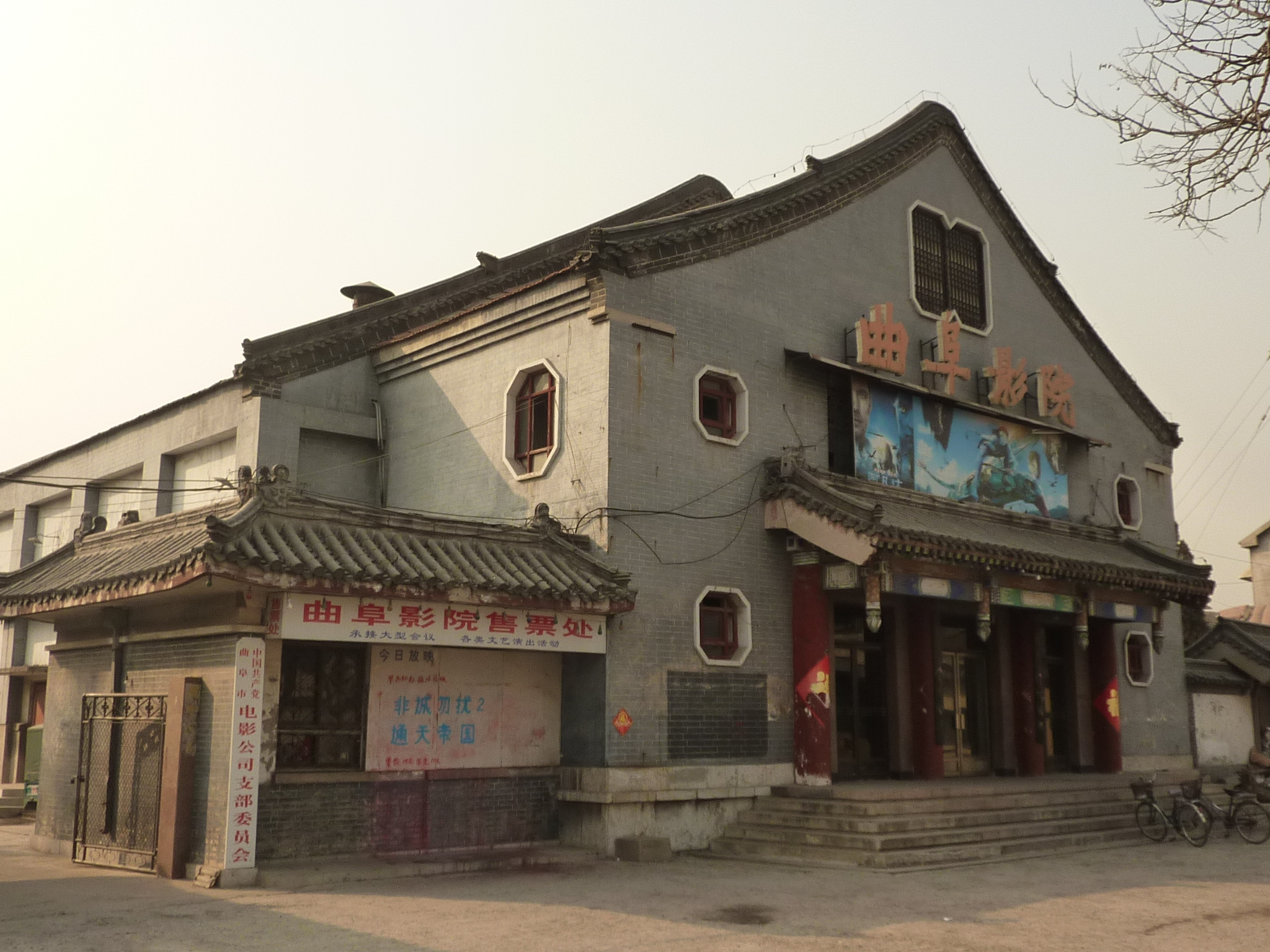
A movie theater in Qufu, Shandong

Beginning in the mid-late 1980s during the New Enlightenment movement in China, the rise of the so-called fifth generation of Chinese filmmakers brought increased popularity of Chinese cinema abroad. Most of the filmmakers who made up the Fifth Generation had graduated from the Beijing Film Academy in 1982 and included Zhang Yimou, Tian Zhuangzhuang, Chen Kaige, Zhang Junzhao, Li Shaohong, Wu Ziniu and others. These graduates constituted the first group of filmmakers to graduate since the Cultural Revolution and they soon jettisoned traditional methods of storytelling and opted for a more free and unorthodox symbolic approach. After the so-called scar literature in fiction had paved the way for frank discussion, Zhang Junzhao's One and Eight (1983) and Chen Kaige's Yellow Earth (1984) in particular were taken to mark the beginnings of the Fifth Generation. (Note: Notably Zhang Yimou served as cinematographer for both films.) Yellow Earth became one of the first Chinese art films to attract international attention.

The most famous of the Fifth Generation directors, Chen Kaige and Zhang Yimou, went on to produce celebrated works such as King of the Children (1987), Ju Dou (1989), Raise the Red Lantern (1991) and Farewell My Concubine (1993), which were not only acclaimed by Chinese cinema-goers but by the Western arthouse audience. Tian Zhuangzhuang's films, though less well known by Western viewers, were well noted by directors such as Martin Scorsese. It was during this period that Chinese cinema began reaping the rewards of international attention, including the 1988 Golden Bear for Red Sorghum, the 1992 Golden Lion for The Story of Qiu Ju, the 1993 Palme d'Or for Farewell My Concubine, and three Best Foreign Language Film nominations from the Academy Awards. All these award-winning films starred actress Gong Li, who became the Fifth Generation's most recognizable star, especially to international audiences.

Diverse in style and subject, the Fifth Generation directors' films ranged from black comedy (Huang Jianxin's The Black Cannon Incident, 1985) to the esoteric (Chen Kaige's Life on a String, 1991), but they share a common rejection of the socialist-realist tradition worked by earlier Chinese filmmakers in the Communist era. Other notable Fifth Generation directors include Wu Ziniu, Hu Mei, Li Shaohong and Zhou Xiaowen. Fifth Generation filmmakers reacted against the ideological purity of Cultural Revolution cinema. By relocating to regional studios, they began to explore the actuality of local culture in a somewhat documentarian fashion. Instead of stories depicting heroic military struggles, the films were built out of the drama of ordinary people's daily lives. They also retained political edge, but aimed at exploring issues rather than recycling approved policy. While Cultural Revolution films used character, the younger directors favored psychological depth along the lines of European cinema. They adopted complex plots, ambiguous symbolism, and evocative imagery. Some of their bolder works with political overtones were banned by Chinese authorities.

These films came with a creative genres of stories, new style of shooting as well, directors utilized extensive color and long shots to present and explore history and structure of national culture. As a result of the new films being so intricate, the films were for more educated audiences than anything. The new style was profitable for some and helped filmmakers to make strides in the business. It allowed directors to get away from reality and show their artistic sense.

The Fourth Generation also returned to prominence. Given their label after the rise of the Fifth Generation, these were directors whose careers were stalled by the Cultural Revolution and who were professionally trained prior to 1966. Wu Tianming, in particular, made outstanding contributions by helping to finance major Fifth Generation directors under the auspices of the Xi'an Film Studio (which he took over in 1983), while continuing to make films like Old Well (1986) and The King of Masks (1996).

The Fifth Generation movement ended in part after the 1989 Tiananmen Square protests and massacre, although its major directors continued to produce notable works. Several of its filmmakers went into self-imposed exile: Wu Tianming moved to the United States (but later returned), Huang Jianxin left for Australia, while many others went into television-related works.

In the late 1980s, a more commercialized and entertainment-focused cinema developed, influenced by the restructuring of state-owned film studios. Red Sorghum is often considered as the most prominent example of a transitional film between the modernist style of the Fifth Generation and the more commercial approach that developed.

=== Main melody dramas ===
During the late 20th century, a period when socialist dramas were beginning to lose viewership, the Chinese government began to involve itself deeper into the world of popular culture and cinema by creating the official genre of the "main melody" (主旋律 zhǔxuánlǜ), inspired by Hollywood's strides in musical dramas. In 1987, the Ministry of Radio, Film and Television issued a statement encouraging the making of movies which emphasizes the main melody to "invigorate national spirit and national pride". The expression main melody refers to the musical term leitmotif, which translates to the 'theme of our times', which scholars suggest is representative of China's socio-political climate and cultural context of popular cinema. These main melody films, still produced regularly in modern times, try to emulate the commercial mainstream by the use of Hollywood-style music and special effects. A significant feature of these films is the incorporation of a "red song", which is a song written as propaganda to support the People's Republic of China. By revolving the film around the motif of a red song, the film is able to gain traction at the box office as songs are generally thought to be more accessible than a film. Theoretically, once the red song dominates the charts, it will stir interest in the film that which it accompanies.

Main melody dramas are often subsidized by the state and have free access to government and military personnel. The Chinese government spends between "one and two million RMBs" annually to support the production of films in the main melody genre. August First Film Studio, the film and TV production arm of the People's Liberation Army, is a studio that produces main melody cinema. Main melody films, which often depict past military engagements or are biopics of first-generation CCP leaders, have won several Best Picture prizes at the Golden Rooster Awards. Some of the more famous main melody dramas include the ten-hour epic Decisive Engagement (大决战, 1991), directed by Cai Jiawei, Yang Guangyuan and Wei Lian; The Opium War (1997), directed by Xie Jin; and The Founding of a Republic (2009), directed by Han Sanping and Fifth Generation director Huang Jianxin. The Founding of an Army (2017) was commissioned by the government to celebrate the 90th anniversary of the People's Liberation Army, and is the third instalment in The Founding of a Republic series. The film featured many young Chinese pop singers that are already well-established in the industry, including Li Yifeng, Liu Haoran, and Lay Zhang, so as to further the film's reputation as a main melody drama.

In contrast to state‑endorsed “main melody” productions, Fifth Generation filmmakers also produced critically acclaimed works that explored personal identity, historical trauma, and social marginalization. One of the most influential examples is Farewell My Concubine (1993), directed by Chen Kaige, a leading figure of the Fifth Generation. Set against the political upheavals of 20th‑century China, the film examines blurred boundaries between performance and self, as well as themes of sexuality, gender identity, and loyalty. Though initially censored in mainland China due to its portrayal of homosexuality and the Cultural Revolution, the film achieved major international recognition, jointly winning the Palme d’Or at the 1993 Cannes Film Festival and becoming one of the most internationally celebrated Chinese films of the late 20th century.

=== The sixth generation ===
When faced with the complexity of real society, their hands and feet quiver, and they deliriously shoot a bunch of childish fairy tales

— The sixth generation director Jia Zhangke's accusation of China's older filmmakers in an essay.

The post-1990 era has been labeled the "return of the amateur filmmaker" as state censorship policies after the 1989 Tiananmen Square protests produced an edgy underground film movement loosely referred to as the Sixth Generation. Owing to the lack of state funding and backing, these films were shot quickly and cheaply, using materials like 16 mm film and digital video and mostly non-professional actors and actresses, producing a documentary feel, often with long takes, hand-held cameras, and ambient sound; more akin to Italian neorealism and cinéma vérité than the often lush, far more considered productions of the Fifth Generation. Unlike the Fifth Generation, the Sixth Generation brings a more individualistic, anti-romantic life-view and pays far closer attention to contemporary urban life, especially as affected by disorientation, rebellion and dissatisfaction with China's contemporary social marketing economic tensions and comprehensive cultural background. Many were made with an extremely low budget (an example is Jia Zhangke, who shoots on digital video, and formerly on 16 mm; Wang Xiaoshuai's The Days (1993) was made for US$10,000). The title and subjects of many of these films reflect the Sixth Generation's concerns. The Sixth Generation takes an interest in marginalized individuals and the less represented fringes of society. For example, Zhang Yuan's hand-held Beijing Bastards (1993) focuses on youth punk subculture, featuring artists like Cui Jian, Dou Wei and He Yong frowned upon by many state authorities, while Jia Zhangke's debut film Xiao Wu (1997) concerns a provincial pickpocket. While many Fifth Generation filmmakers have become darlings of mainstream Chinese culture, Sixth Generation filmmakers have often experienced harsh treatment by the state's censorship and regulatory system, despite their success at international film festivals and arthouse markets.

As the Sixth Generation gained international exposure, many subsequent movies were joint ventures and projects with international backers, but remained quite resolutely low-key and low budget. Jia's Platform (2000) was funded in part by Takeshi Kitano's production house, while his Still Life was shot on high-definition video (HD). Still Life was a surprise addition and Golden Lion winner of the 2006 Venice International Film Festival. Still Life, which concerns provincial workers around the Three Gorges region, sharply contrasts with the works of Fifth Generation Chinese directors like Zhang Yimou and Chen Kaige who were at the time producing House of Flying Daggers (2004) and The Promise (2005). It featured no star of international renown and was acted mostly by non-professionals.

Many Sixth Generation films have highlighted the negative attributes of China's entry into the modern capitalist market. Li Yang's Blind Shaft (2003) for example, is an account of two murderous con-men in the unregulated and notoriously dangerous mining industry of northern China. (Li refused the tag of Sixth Generation, although admitted he was not Fifth Generation). Jia Zhangke's The World (2004) emphasizes the emptiness of globalization in the backdrop of an internationally themed amusement park.

Some of the more prolific Sixth Generation directors to have emerged are Wang Xiaoshuai (The Days, Beijing Bicycle, So Long, My Son), Zhang Yuan (Beijing Bastards, East Palace West Palace), Jia Zhangke (Xiao Wu, Unknown Pleasures, Platform, The World, A Touch of Sin, Mountains May Depart, Ash Is Purest White), He Jianjun (Postman) and Lou Ye (Suzhou River, Summer Palace). One director of their generation who does not share most of the concerns of the Sixth Generation is Lu Chuan (Kekexili: Mountain Patrol, 2004; City of Life and Death, 2010).

==== Notable Sixth Generation directors ====
In the 2018 Cannes Film Festival, two of China's Sixth generation filmmakers, Jia Zhangke and Zhang Ming – whose grim works transformed Chinese cinema in the 1990s – showed on the French Riviera. While both directors represent Chinese cinema, their profiles are quite different. The 49-year-old Jia set up the Pingyao International Film Festival in 2017 and on the other hand is Zhang, a 56-year-old film school professor who spent years working on government commissions and domestic TV shows after struggling with his own projects. Despite their different profiles, they mark an important cornerstone in Chinese cinema and are both credited with bringing Chinese movies to the international big screen. Chinese director Jia Zhangke's latest film Ash Is Purest White has been selected to compete in the official competition for the Palme d'Or of the 71st Cannes Film Festival, the highest prize awarded at the film festival. It is Jia's fifth movie, a gangster revenge drama that is his most expensive and mainstream film to date. Back in 2013, Jia won Best Screenplay Award for A Touch of Sin, following nominations for Unknown Pleasures in 2002 and 24 City in 2008. In 2014, he was a member of the official jury and the following year his film Mountains May Depart was nominated. According to entertainment website Variety, a record number of Chinese films were submitted this year but only Jia's romantic drama was selected to compete for the Palme d'Or. Meanwhile, Zhang will make his debut at Cannes with The Pluto Moment, a slow-moving relationship drama about a team of filmmakers scouting for locations and musical talent in China's rural hinterland. The film is Zhang's highest profile production so far, as it stars actor Wang Xuebing in the leading role. The film was partly financed by iQiyi, the company behind one of China's most popular online video browsing sharing sites. Diao Yinan is also a notable member of the sixth generation whose works include Black Coal Thin Ice, Wild Goose Lake, Night Train and Uniform which have premiered at festivals such as Cannes and received acclaim abroad.

== Other directors ==
He Ping is a director of mostly Western-like films set in Chinese locale. His Swordsmen in Double Flag Town (1991) and Sun Valley (1995) explore narratives set in the sparse terrain of West China near the Gobi Desert. His historical drama Red Firecracker, Green Firecracker (1994) won a myriad of prizes home and abroad.

Recent cinema has seen Chinese cinematographers direct some acclaimed films. Other than Zhang Yimou, Lü Yue made Mr. Zhao (1998), a black comedy film well received abroad. Gu Changwei's minimalist epic Peacock (2005), about a quiet, ordinary Chinese family with three very different siblings in the post-Cultural Revolution era, took home the Silver Bear prize for 2005 Berlin International Film Festival. Hou Yong is another cinematographer who made films (Jasmine Women, 2004) and TV series. There are actors who straddle the dual roles of acting and directing. Xu Jinglei, a popular Chinese actress, has made six movies to date. Her second film Letter from an Unknown Woman (2004) landed her the San Sebastián International Film Festival Best Director award. Another popular actress and director is Zhao Wei, whose directorial debut So Young (2013) was a huge box office and critical success.

The most highly regarded Chinese actor-director is undoubtedly Jiang Wen, who has directed several critically acclaimed movies while following on his acting career. His directorial debut, In the Heat of the Sun (1994) was the first PRC film to win Best Picture at the Golden Horse Film Awards held in Taiwan. His other films, like Devils on the Doorstep (2000, Cannes Grand Prix) and Let the Bullets Fly (2010), were similarly well received. By the early 2011, Let the Bullets Fly had become the highest grossing domestic film in China's history.

== Generation-independent movement ==
There is a growing number of independent seventh or post-Sixth Generation filmmakers making films with extremely low budgets and using digital equipment. They are the so-called dGeneration (for digital). These films, like those from Sixth Generation filmmakers, are mostly made outside the Chinese film system and are shown mostly on the international film festival circuit. Ying Liang and Jian Yi are two of these generation filmmakers. Ying's Taking Father Home (2005) and The Other Half (2006) are both representative of the generation trends of the feature film. Liu Jiayin made two dGeneration feature films, Oxhide (2004) and Oxhide II (2010), blurring the line between documentary and narrative film. Oxhide, made by Liu when she was a film student, frames herself and her parents in their claustrophobic Beijing apartment in a narrative praised by critics. An Elephant Sitting Still, considered one of the greatest film debuts in Chinese cinema, is also the only film by the late Hu Bo.

== New documentary movement ==
Two decades of reform and commercialization have brought dramatic social changes in mainland China, reflected not only in fiction film but in a growing documentary movement. Wu Wenguang's 70-minute Bumming in Beijing: The Last Dreamers (1990) is now seen as one of the first works of this "New Documentary Movement" (NDM) in China. Bumming, made between 1988 and 1990, contains interviews with five young artists eking out a living in Beijing, subject to state authorized tasks. Shot using a camcorder, the documentary ends with four of the artists moving abroad after the 1989 Tiananmen Square protests and massacre. Dance with the Farm Workers (2001) is another documentary by Wu.

Another internationally acclaimed documentary is Wang Bing's nine-hour tale of deindustrialization Tie Xi Qu: West of the Tracks (2003). Wang's subsequent documentaries, He Fengming (2007), Crude Oil (2008), Man with no name (2009), Three Sisters (2012) and Feng ai (2013), cemented his reputation as a leading documentarist of the movement.

Li Hong, the first woman in the NDM, in Out of Phoenix Bridge (1997) relates the story of four young women, who moving from rural areas to the big cities like millions of other men and women, have come to Beijing to make a living.

The New Documentary Movement in recent times has overlapped with the dGeneration filmmaking, with most documentaries being shot cheaply and independently in the digital format. Xu Xin's Karamay (2010), Zhao Liang's Behemoth, Huang Weikai's Disorder (2009), Zhao Dayong's Ghost Town (2009), Du Haibing's 1428 (2009), Xu Tong's Fortune Teller (2009) and Li Ning's Tape (2010) were all shot in digital format. All had made their impact in the international documentary scene and the use of digital format allows for works of vaster lengths.

== Animation ==
=== Before the 1950s ===
Inspired by the success of Disney animation, the self-taught pioneers Wan brothers, Wan Laiming and Wan Guchan, made the first Chinese animated short in the 1920s, thus inaugurating the history of Chinese animation. (Chen Yuanyuan 175) Many live-action films of the Republican era also included animated sequences.

In 1937, the Wan brothers decided to produce 《铁扇公主》 Princess Iron Fan, which was the first Chinese animated feature film and the fourth, after the American feature films Snow White, Gulliver's Travels, and The Adventures of Pinocchio. It was at this time that Chinese animation as an art form had risen to prominence on the world stage. Completed in 1941, the film was released under China United Pictures and aroused a great response in Asia. Japanese animator Osamu Tezuka once said that he gave up medicine after watching the cartoon and decided to pursue animation.

=== 1950s–1980s ===
During this golden era, Chinese animation had developed a variety of styles, including ink animation, shadow play animation, puppet animation, and so on. Some of the most representative works are 《大闹天宫》 Havoc in Heaven, 《哪吒闹海》 Nezha's Rebellion in the Sea and《天书奇谈》 Heavenly Book, which have also won lofty praise and numerous awards in the world.

=== 1980s–1990s ===
After Deng Xiaoping's Reform Period and the "opening up" of China, the movies《葫芦兄弟》 Calabash Brothers, 《黑猫警长》Black Cat Sheriff, 《阿凡提》Avanti Story and other impressive animated movies were released. However, at this time, China still favored the Japanese's more unique, American and European-influenced animated works over the less-advanced domestic ones.

=== 1990s–2010s ===
In the 1990s, digital production methods replaced manual hand-drawing methods; however, even with the use of advanced technology, none of the animated works were considered to be a breakthrough film. Animated films that tried to cater to all age groups, such as Lotus Lantern and Storm Resolution, did not attract much attention. The only animated works that seemed to achieve popularity were the ones for catered for children, such as Pleasant Goat and Big Big Wolf《喜羊羊与灰太狼》.

=== 2010s–present ===
During this period, the technical level of Chinese domestic animation production has been established comprehensively, and 3D animation films have become the mainstream. However, as more and more foreign films (such as ones from Japan, Europe, and the United States) are being imported into China, Chinese animated works is left in the shadows of these animated foreign films.

It was only with the release of 《西游记之大圣归来》Monkey King: Hero Is Back in 2015, a computer-animated film, that Chinese animated works took back the rein. The film was a huge hit and broke the record for Chinese domestic animated movies with CN¥956 million at China's box office. After the success of Journey to the West, several other high-quality animated films were released, such as《大鱼海棠》 Big Fish and Begonia and 《白蛇缘起》 White Snake. Though none of these movies made headway in regards to the box office, they did make filmmakers more and more interested in animated works.

This all changed with the breakthrough animated film, 《哪吒之魔童降世》Ne Zha. Released in 2019, it became the second highest-grossing film of all time in China, the highest-grossing animated non-English film, and the highest-grossing animated film in a single territory. It was with this film that Chinese animated films, as a medium, broke the notion in China that domestic animated films are only for children. With Nezha, and a spinoff, Jiang Ziya, Chinese animation has now come to be known as a considerable source of entertainment for all ages.

== New models and the new Chinese cinema ==
=== Commercial successes ===
With China's liberalization in the late 1970s and its opening up to foreign markets, commercial considerations have made its impact in post-1980s filmmaking. Traditionally arthouse movies screened seldom make enough to break even. An example is Fifth Generation director Tian Zhuangzhuang's The Horse Thief (1986), a narrative film with minimal dialog on a Tibetan horse thief. The film, showcasing exotic landscapes, was well received by Chinese and some Western arthouse audiences, but did poorly at the box office. Tian's later The Warrior and the Wolf (2010) was a similar commercial failure.

Prior to these, there were examples of successful commercial films in the post-liberalization period. One was the romance film Romance on the Lu Mountain (1980), which was a success with older Chinese. The film broke the Guinness Book of Records as the longest-running film on a first run. Jet Li's cinematic debut Shaolin Temple (1982) was an instant hit at home and abroad (in Japan and the Southeast Asia, for example). Another successful commercial film was Murder in 405 (405谋杀案, 1980), a murder thriller. Feng Xiaogang's The Dream Factory (1997) was heralded as a turning point in Chinese movie industry, a hesui pian (Chinese New Year-screened film) which demonstrated the viability of the commercial model in China's socialist market economy. Feng has become one of the most successful commercial director in the post-1997 era. Almost all his films made high returns domestically while he used ethnic Chinese co-stars like Rosamund Kwan, Jacqueline Wu, Rene Liu and Shu Qi to boost his films' appeal. In the decade following 2010, owing to the influx of Hollywood films (though the number screened each year is curtailed), Chinese domestic cinema faces mounting challenges. The industry is growing and domestic films are starting to achieve the box office impact of major Hollywood blockbusters. However, not all domestic films are successful financially. In January 2010 James Cameron's Avatar was pulled out from non-3D theaters for Hu Mei's biopic Confucius, but this move led to a backlash on Hu's film. Zhang Yang's 2005 Sunflower also made little money, but his earlier, low-budget Spicy Love Soup (1997) grossed ten times its budget of ¥3 million. Likewise, the 2006 Crazy Stone, a sleeper hit, was made for just 3 million HKD/US$400,000. In 2009–11, Feng's Aftershock (2009) and Jiang Wen's Let the Bullets Fly (2010) became China's highest grossing domestic films, with Aftershock earning ¥670 million (US$105 million) and Let the Bullets Fly ¥674 million (US$110 million). Lost in Thailand (2012) became the first Chinese film to reach ¥1 billion at the Chinese box office and Monster Hunt (2015) became the first to reach CN¥2 billion.

As of 2021, 9 of the top 10 highest-grossing films in China are domestic productions. On 8 February 2016, the Chinese box office set a new single-day gross record, with CN¥660 million, beating the previous record of CN¥425 million on 18 July 2015. Also in February 2016, The Mermaid, directed by Stephen Chow, became the highest-grossing film in China, overtaking Monster Hunt. It is also the first film to reach CN¥3 billion.

Under the influence of Hollywood science fiction movies like Prometheus, published on 8 June 2012, such genres especially the space science films have risen rapidly in the Chinese film market in recent years. On 5 February 2019, the film The Wandering Earth directed by Frant Gwo reached $699.8 million worldwide, which became the third highest-grossing film in the history of Chinese cinema.

=== Chinese international cinema and successes abroad ===
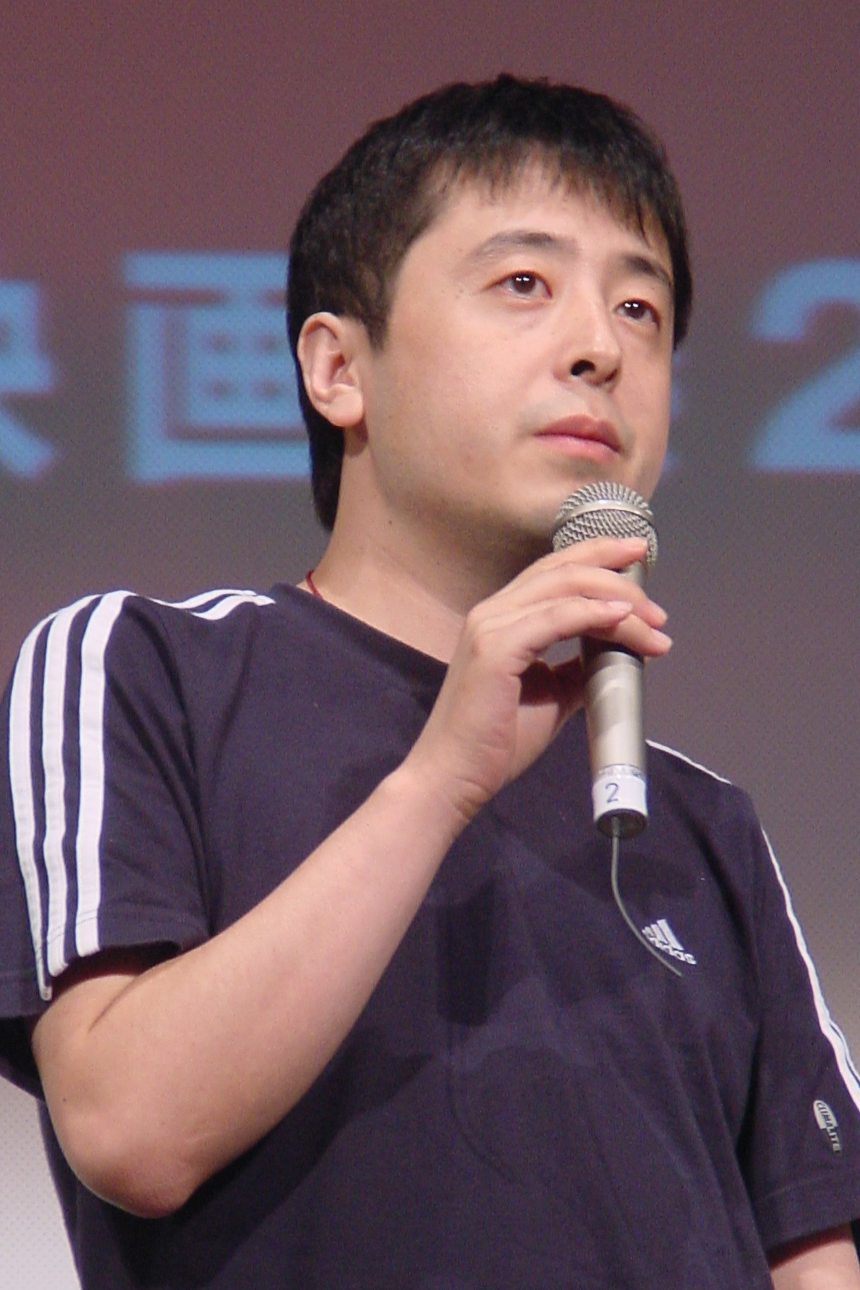
Director Jia Zhangke at the Skip City International D-Cinema Festival in Kawaguchi, Saitama, Japan, 22 July 2005

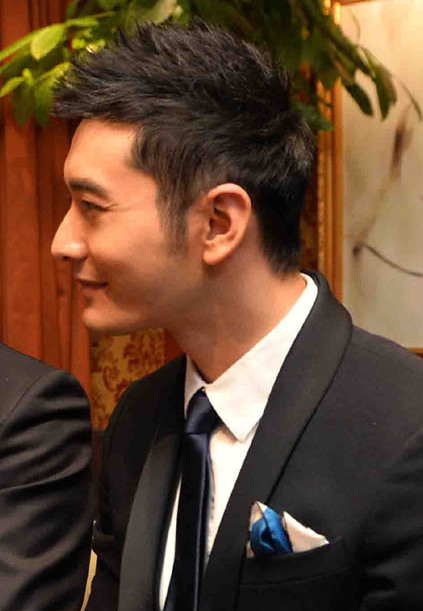
Huang Xiaoming, a Chinese actor, singer, and model

Since the late 1980s and progressively in the 2000s, Chinese films have enjoyed considerable box office success abroad. Formerly viewed only by cineastes, its global appeal mounted after the international box office and critical success of Ang Lee's period wuxia film Crouching Tiger, Hidden Dragon which won Academy Award for Best Foreign Language Film in 2000. This multi-national production increased its appeal by featuring stars from all parts of the Chinese-speaking world. It provided an introduction to Chinese cinema (and especially the wuxia genre) for many and increased the popularity of many earlier Chinese films. To date Crouching Tiger remains the most commercially successful foreign-language film in U.S. history.

In 2002, Zhang Yimou's Hero was another international box office success. Its cast featured famous actors from mainland China and Hong Kong who were also known to some extent in the West, including Jet Li, Zhang Ziyi, Maggie Cheung and Tony Leung Chiu-Wai. Despite criticisms by some that these two films pander somewhat to Western tastes, Hero was a phenomenal success in most of Asia and topped the U.S. box office for two weeks, making enough in the U.S. alone to cover the production costs.

Other films such as Farewell My Concubine, 2046, Suzhou River, The Road Home and House of Flying Daggers were critically acclaimed around the world. The Hengdian World Studios can be seen as the "Chinese Hollywood", with a total area of up to 330 ha. and 13 shooting bases, including a 1:1 copy of the Forbidden City.

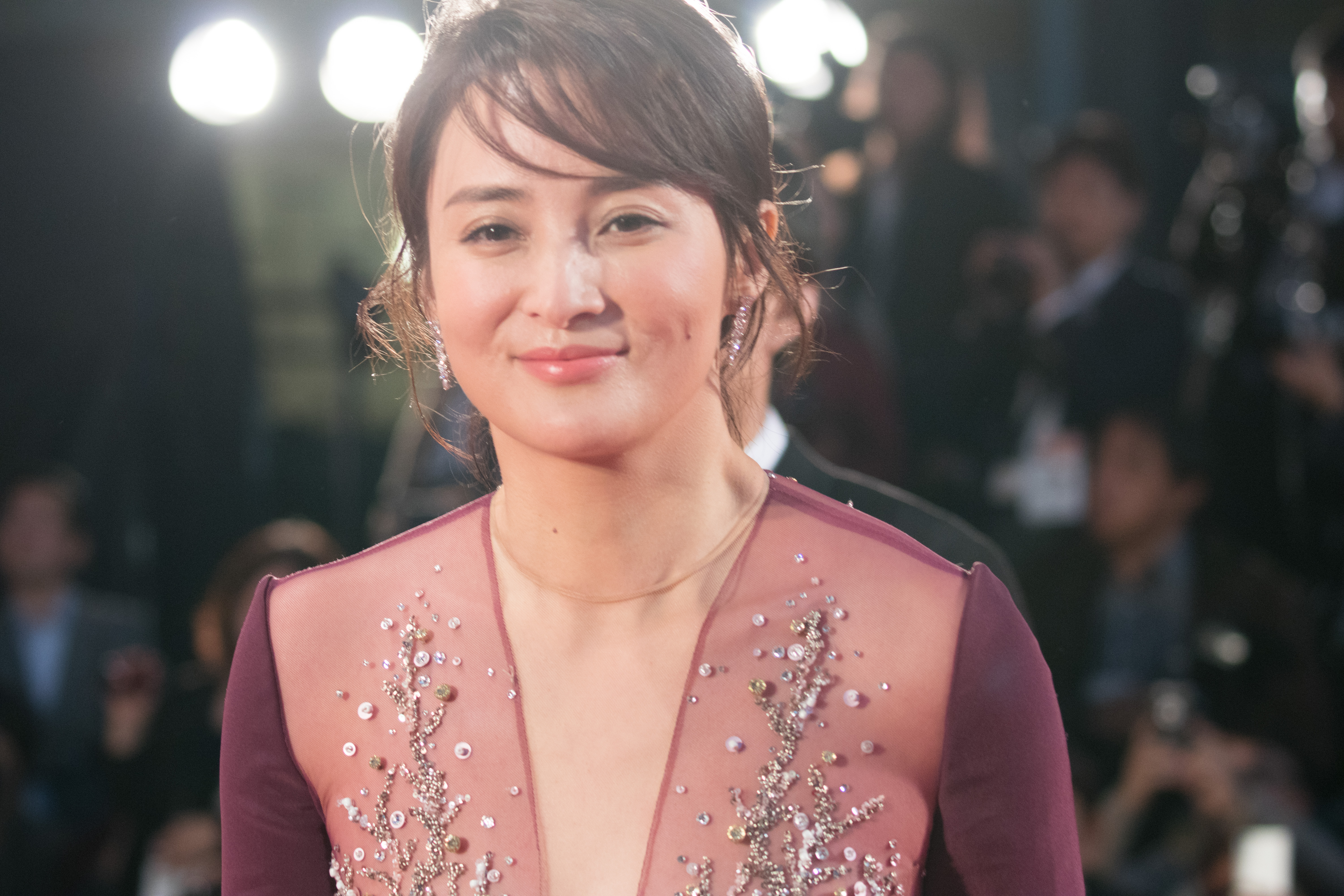
Jiang Qinqin at Opening Ceremony of the Tokyo International Film Festival 2016

The successes of Crouching Tiger, Hidden Dragon and Hero make it difficult to demarcate the boundary between "Mainland Chinese" cinema and a more international-based "Chinese-language cinema". Crouching Tiger, for example, was directed by a Taiwanese director (Ang Lee) who works often in Hollywood. Its pan-Chinese leads include mainland Chinese (Zhang Ziyi), Hong Kong (Chow Yun-Fat), Taiwan (Chang Chen) and Malaysian (Michelle Yeoh) actors and actresses; the film was co-produced by an array of Chinese, American, Hong Kong, and Taiwan film companies. Likewise, Lee's Chinese-language Lust, Caution (2007) drew a crew and cast from mainland China, Hong Kong and Taiwan, and includes an orchestral score by French composer Alexandre Desplat. This merging of people, resources and expertise from the three regions and the broader East Asia and the world, marks the movement of Chinese-language cinema into a domain of large scale international influence. Other examples of films in this mold include The Promise (2005), The Banquet (2006), Fearless (2006), The Warlords (2007), Bodyguards and Assassins (2009) and Red Cliff (2008–09). The ease with which ethnic Chinese actresses and actors straddle the mainland and Hong Kong has significantly increased the number of co-productions in Chinese-language cinema. Many of these films also feature South Korean or Japanese actors to appeal to their East Asian neighbours. Some artistes originating from the mainland, like Hu Jun, Zhang Ziyi, Tang Wei and Zhou Xun, obtained Hong Kong residency under the Quality Migrant Admission Scheme and have acted in many Hong Kong productions.

== Industry ==
=== Box office and screens ===
In 1983, there were 162,000 projection units in China, up from less than 600 at the 1949 founding of the PRC.

In 1998, the Ministry of Culture revived the practice of mobile rural cinema as part of its 2131 Project which aimed to screen one movie per month per village in rural China and upgrade analog equipment to digital projectors. In 2003, the central government provided more than 400 film projection vans to Tibet and Xinjiang to show films in an effort to oppose what the government viewed as separatism and Westernization.

In 2010, Chinese cinema was the third largest film industry by number of feature films produced annually. In 2013, China's gross box office was ¥21.8 billion (US$3.6 billion), the second-largest film market in the world by box office receipts. In January 2013, Lost in Thailand (2012) became the first Chinese film to reach ¥1 billion at the box office. As of May 2013, 7 of the top 10 highest-grossing films in China were domestic productions. As of 2014, around half of all tickets are sold online, with the largest ticket selling sites being Maoyan.com (82 million), Gewara.com (45 million) and Wepiao.com (28 million). In 2014, Chinese films earned ¥1.87 billion outside China. By December 2013 there were 17,000 screens in the country. By 6 January 2014, there were 18,195 screens in the country. Greater China has around 251 IMAX theaters. There were 299 cinema chains (252 rural, 47 urban), 5,813 movie theaters and 24,317 screens in the country in 2014.

The country added about 8,035 screens in 2015 (at an average of 22 new screens per day, increasing its total by about 40% to around 31,627 screens, which is about 7,373 shy of the number of screens in the United States. Chinese films accounted for 61.48% of ticket sales in 2015 (up from 54% last year) with more than 60% of ticket sales being made online. Average ticket price was down about 2.5% to $5.36 in 2015. In 2015, there was 48.7% increase in the box office, with the country's population of 1.35 billion going to the movies an average of 0.8 times that year. Chinese films grossed US$427 million overseas in 2015. During the week of the 2016 Chinese New Year, the country set a new record for the highest box office gross during one week in one territory with US$548 million, overtaking the previous record of US$529.6 million of 26 December 2015 to 1 January 2016 in the United States and Canada. Chinese films grossed CN¥3.83 billion (US$550 million) in foreign markets in 2016.

In 2020, China's market for films surpassed the U.S. market to become the largest such market in the world.

Since the early 2020s, Chinese cinema has faced growing competition from duanju (short vertical dramas). In 2024, industry reports indicated that the duanju market surpassed the national film box office for the first time, generating over 50 billion yuan compared to 47 billion for traditional cinema. This shift reflects evolving viewing habits, especially among younger audiences.

Year	Gross (in billions of yuans)	Domestic share	Tickets sold (in millions)	Number of screens
2003	less than 1			
2004	1.5			
2005	2	60%	157.2	4,425
2006	2.67		176.2	3,034 or 4,753
2007	3.33	55%	195.8	3,527 or 5,630
2008	4.34	61%	209.8	4,097 or 5,722
2009	6.21	56%	263.8	4,723 or 6,323
2010	10.17	56%	290	6,256 or 7,831
2011	13.12	54%	370	9,286
2012	17.07	48.5%	462	
2013	21.77	59%	612	18,195
2014	29.6	55%	830	23,600
2015	44	61.6%	1,260	31,627
2016	45.71	58.33%	1,370	41,179
2017	55.9	53.8%	1,620	50,776
2018	60.98	62.2%	1720	60,000
2019	64.27	64.1%		69,787
2020	20.42	83.7%		75,581
2021	47.26	84.5%		82,248
2022	30.07	84.9%		
2023	54.92	83.8%		86,310
2024	42.50	78.7%		90,968

=== Film companies ===
As of April 2015, the largest Chinese film company by worth was Alibaba Pictures (US$8.77 billion). Other large companies include Huayi Brothers Media (US$7.9 billion), Enlight Media (US$5.98 billion) and Bona Film Group (US$542 million). The biggest distributors by market share in 2014 were: China Film Group (32.8%), Huaxia Film (22.89%), Enlight Pictures (7.75%), Bona Film Group (5.99%), Wanda Media (5.2%), Le Vision Pictures (4.1%), Huayi Brothers (2.26%), United Exhibitor Partners (2%), Heng Ye Film Distribution (1.77%) and Beijing Anshi Yingna Entertainment (1.52%). The biggest cinema chains in 2014 by box office gross were: Wanda Cinema Line (US$676.96 million), China Film Stellar (393.35 million), Dadi Theater Circuit (378.17 million), Shanghai United Circuit (355.07 million), Guangzhou Jinyi Zhujiang (335.39 million), China Film South Cinema Circuit (318.71 million), Zhejiang Time Cinema (190.53 million), China Film Group Digital Cinema Line (177.42 million), Hengdian Cinema Line (170.15 million) and Beijing New Film Association (163.09 million).

==== Notable independent (non-state-owned) film companies ====
Independent films in China increased in the 1990s and again in the early 2000s.

Huayi Brothers is China's most powerful independent (i.e., non state-owned) entertainment company, Beijing-based Huayi Brothers is a diversified company engaged in film and TV production, distribution, theatrical exhibition, as well as talent management. Notable films include 2004's Kung Fu Hustle; and 2010's Aftershock, which had a 91% rating on Rotten Tomatoes.

Beijing Enlight Media focuses on the action and romance genres. Enlight usually places several films in China's top 20 grossers. Enlight is also a major player in China's TV series production and distribution businesses. Under the leadership of its CEO Wang Changtian, the publicly traded, Beijing-based company has achieved a market capitalization of nearly US$1 billion.

=== Law ===
In November 2016, China passed a film law banning content deemed harmful to the "dignity, honor and interests" of the People's Republic and encouraging the promotion of core socialist values, approved by the National People's Congress Standing Committee. Since 2017, the industry is regulated by the Film Industry Promotion Act.

== See also ==
- List of highest-grossing films in China
- Cinema of Asia
- East Asian cinema
- Chinese animation
- Chinese art
- Kung Fu film
- Movie Town Haikou
- Oriental Movie Metropolis
- August First Film Studio
- Chinese cinema in Nigeria

=== Lists ===
- List of Chinese actors
- List of Chinese actresses
- List of Chinese directors
- List of Chinese films
- List of Chinese film production companies (pre-PRC)
- List of highest-grossing films in China
- List of film production companies by country#China
- List of highest-grossing non-English films
