= Crossroads (1937 film) =

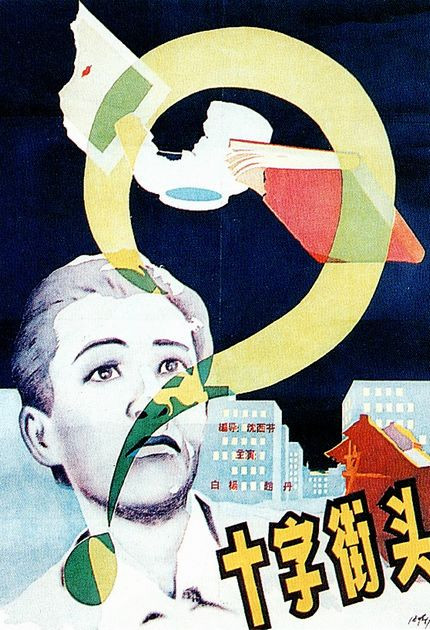
- Film poster
- Traditional Chinese: 十字街頭
- Simplified Chinese: 十字街头
- Hanyu Pinyin: Shízì jiētóu
- Directed by: Shen Xiling
- Written by: Shen Xiling
- Starring: Zhao Dan; Bai Yang
- Cinematography: Zhou Shimu; Wang Yuru
- Edited by: Qian Xiaozhang
- Music by: He Luting
- Production company: Mingxing Film Company
- Release date: 15 April 1937 (China)
- Running time: 110 minutes
- Country: China
- Language: Mandarin Chinese

Crossroads is a 1937 Chinese seriocomedy film directed by Shen Xiling, starring Bai Yang and Zhao Dan. The film exemplified the growing trend of Chinese films by the mid-1930s of incorporating references (both veiled and explicit) to the war with Japan. In this way, Crossroads joins films like Blood on Wolf Mountain by Fei Mu and The Big Road by Sun Yu.

Crossroads has its background in the Great Depression of the 1930s. Produced by Mingxing Film Company, the film also represented an expansion by Mingxing into the leftist film market that had been dominated by its rival Lianhua Film Company, due to a flagging financial situation.

In 2001, a sequel was made, despite the half-century gap, entitled New Crossroads.

== Plot ==
Crossroads begins at a dock at Shanghai, where college graduate Xu is contemplating suicide because he cannot find a job. His friend Zhao (Zhao Dan) stops him and leads him back to their rented apartment. We learn that the four graduate friends are all jobless. Zhao serenades to Xu and dissuades him from thoughts of suicide, asking him to concentrate on his freelance translation job instead. Xu tells Zhao he has decided to sell his degree in order to raise funds to see his mother in the countryside. His other friend Tang comes to celebrate his own birthday with a fourth friend, Liu.

A female college graduate Yang (Bai Yang) comes to Shanghai to look for a job, and rents the room beside Zhao's. Meanwhile, Zhao finds a job in the press. Jubilant, he washes his laundry and hangs them up on a pole that extends into his neighbour's room. Yang is napping, and the wet laundry drips her pillow wet. Yang's friend comes in and bangs a few nails for her to hang her clothes, and Zhao's framed photos fall off at the opposite side of the wall.

Zhao comes home from work in the morning, while Yang goes to work as a trainer at a textile factory. Zhao leaves a bag in the tram he has just alighted, but fortunately, Yang helps retrieve it for him through the window. When Zhao gets home, he sees his scattered photos on the floor back in his apartment and retaliates by hitting the nails through to the other side and flinging rubbish to the other room. The girls hit back in the night, when he is not around, and write him a note of warning. Hence begins a lighthearted feud that swings backward and forth between the two parties.

Zhao meets Yang again in the tram and helps her retrieve something she dropped outside the window. He goes to her textile company to find materials to write his journalistic report and helps fight a hooligan who is harassing Yang. The two arrange to meet at a park nearby a couple of days later for his interview. By then, Yang has already realized he is the tenant next door. After the interview, Zhao does a series of write-ups entitled "the sad life-story of a female worker".

One day, Yang finally knocks on Zhao's door and reveals to him who she really is. She tells him she is only disclosing this secret because she is leaving Shanghai – the factory she works in has recently closed down. Zhao stops her and tells her that he will support her in Shanghai. However, after he goes to work, Yang goes through a dilemma, and finally decides to leave so as not to be a financial burden on him. When Yang's friend realizes they are pining for each other, she decides to bring the couple together again.

By then, Zhao has received news that he, too, has been dismissed from his job. He and Tang walk towards the pier, where they meet Yang and her friend, who are also out of work. They read in the newspaper that their friend Xu has committed suicide because he is unemployed. Zhao and Tang conclude that Xu is too weak and that they must be optimistic like their other friend Liu in facing their paths in life. As the film comes to an end, the four friends walk forward side by side with their arms entwined.

== Cast ==
- Dan Zhao as Zhao
- Yang Bai as Miss Yang
- Ban Lü as Ban Lu

== DVD release ==
Crossroads was released on Region 0 DVD in the United States on May 8, 2007, by Cinema Epoch. The disc features English subtitles and also includes Sun Yu's Daybreak.
