= Blood on Wolf Mountain =

1936 film

- Film poster
- Traditional Chinese: 狼山喋血記
- Simplified Chinese: 狼山喋血记
- Hanyu Pinyin: Láng shān dié xuě jì
- Directed by: Fei Mu
- Written by: Fei Mu
- Produced by: Wu Xingzai
- Starring: Lan Ping; Li Lili; Zhang Yi
- Cinematography: Zhou Daming
- Music by: Ren Guang
- Production company: Lianhua Film Company
- Release date: November 1936
- Running time: 70 minutes
- Country: China
- Language: Mandarin

Blood on Wolf Mountain, also known as The Wolf Hill, Bloodbath in Langshan, and Bloodshed on Wolf Mountain, is a Chinese film directed by acclaimed Shanghainese film director Fei Mu. Made just prior to the commencement of full-scale war with Imperial Japan, the film itself is often considered an allegory of conflict between China and Japan that had been going on intermittently since the Invasion of Manchuria in 1931. The film was produced by the Lianhua Film Company and was released in November 1936.

== Plot ==
The film tells the story of a village that is beset by a pack of wolves. Though the symbolism was clear, the Japanese themselves refused to acknowledge that they could be represented by blood-thirsty wolves.

== Cast ==
Blood on Wolf Mountain starred actresses Li Lili, and Lan Ping (who later in life would adopt the name Jiang Qing and gain notoriety as the wife of Mao Zedong and a member of the Gang of Four).

== See also ==
- Second Sino-Japanese War, the political background behind Blood on Wolf Mountain
- Cinema of China
- The first episode of BBC documentary Can't Get You Out of My Head by Adam Curtis is called "Bloodshed on Wolf Mountain".
