= Barbara Fei =

Hong Kong opera singer (1931–2017)

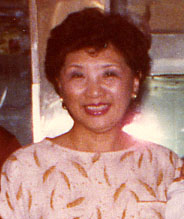
- Barbara Fei in 1983

Background information
- Also known as: Barbara Fei Ming-yi,
- Born: 8 July 1931; Tianjin, China
- Origin: Hong Kong
- Died: 3 January 2017 (aged 85) Hong Kong, China
- Genres: Chinese folk music Opera
- Occupation: Opera singer
- Instrument: Vocal
- Years active: 1951–2016

Barbara Fei (Chinese: 費明儀; pinyin: Fèi Míngyí; 8 July 1931 – 3 January 2017), also known as Barbara Fei Ming-yi, was a Hong Kong soprano opera singer. She was founder of a choral group, Allegro Singers, which performed for over 50 years.

== Biography ==
Fei was born in 1931 in Tianjin, China, at the outset of the Second Sino-Japanese War. At age four, she performed from memory "The Family Song", from a film directed by her father, Fei Mu, one of China's top film directors.

Fei studied piano and vocal music at the Nanjing Conservatory in the late 1940s, before relocating to Hong Kong with her family in 1949. She made her debut at a 1951 concert, presented by the Sino-British Orchestra, inaugurating the new hall at Queen's College (Hong Kong).

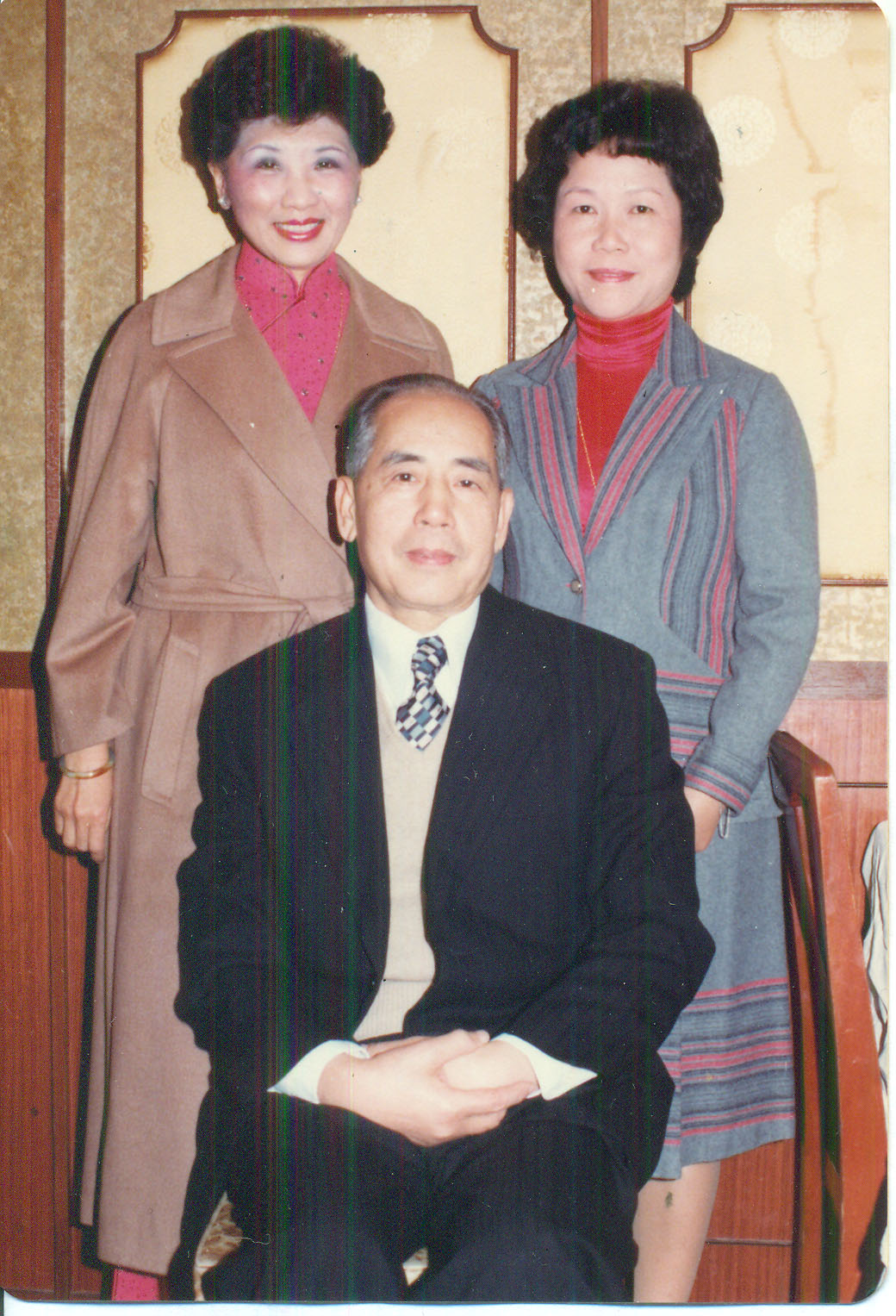
Fei (left, standing) in Hong Kong, 1982 with Mezzo-Soprano Cecilia Chu and composer Hwang Yau-tai (seated).

In 1956, Fei joined the Sino-British Orchestra to perform in Guangzhou, and, later that year, flew to Paris to study under European soprano Lotte Schöne for three years. She founded the Allegro Singers in 1964 and commissioned Chinese composers to arrange folk songs for chorus, which she did for every annual concert up to 2016.

Fei was awarded the Bronze and a Silver Bauhinia Medal in 2001 and 2012. She was a long-time member of the Hong Kong Arts Development Council, serving also as head of music until late 2016. Despite plans for a January 2017 Taipei performance, Fei's final one was in November 2016, when she conducted the Allegro Singers at a concert series presented by the Chinese Women Composers' Association, of which she was honorary president.

== Death ==
Fei died on 3 January 2017, aged 85, at the Hong Kong Sanitorium and Hospital. She was survived by two sons.
