= Film Industry Promotion Act =

2017 law in China

- Simplified Chinese: 电影产业促进法
- Traditional Chinese: 電影產業促進法
Transcriptions
Standard Mandarin
- Hanyu Pinyin: Diànyǐng Chǎnyè Cùjìn Fǎ

The Film Industry Promotion Act is a 2017 Chinese law related to topics such as film production, film distribution, and film screening. It has been described as the most significant Chinese national level act related to filmmaking up to that date ("the first Chinese film law"), marking the first time the country codified the regulation and development of its film industry.

The act legalized the previously informal practice of imposed a professional ban on filmmakers who sent their films abroad to compete at an international film festival without obtaining a prior approval from a relevant government agency.
