= Dadi Theater Circuit =

Chinese cinema chain

- Industry: Film
- Headquarters: China

Dadi Theater Circuit (Chinese: 大地院线) is a Chinese cinema chain. In 2014 it was the 3rd largest cinema chain in China, with US$378.17 million in box office gross, behind Wanda Cinema Line and China Film Stellar. As of December 2015, it was China's second-largest cinema chain, with 276 cinemas operating 1,300 screens. As of 2016, it had 1,911 screens in 350 cinemas.
