= Fei Mu =

Chinese film director

- Born: October 10, 1906; Shanghai, China
- Died: January 31, 1951 (aged 44); British Hong Kong
- Occupation(s): Director, screenwriter, film producer
- Years active: 1933-1951
- Children: Barbara Fei

Chinese name
- Traditional Chinese: 費穆
- Simplified Chinese: 费穆
Transcriptions
Standard Mandarin
- Hanyu Pinyin: Fèi Mù

Fei Mu (October 10, 1906 – January 31, 1951), also romanised as Fey Mou, was a Chinese film director of the pre-Communist era. His Spring in a Small Town (1948) was declared the greatest Chinese film ever made by the Hong Kong Film Critics Society.

== Biography ==
Fei Mu's ancestral hometown is Suzhou, Jiangsu Province. He was born in Shanghai, China in 1906. Before becoming a director, he worked as an assistant of the film pioneer Hou Yao.

Known for his artistic style and costume dramas, Fei made his first film, Night in the City (1933), produced by the Lianhua Film Company), at the age of 27, and he was met with both critical and popular acclaim; the film is now lost. Continuing to make films with Lianhua, Fei directed films throughout the 1930s and became a major talent in the industry, with films like Blood on Wolf Mountain (1936) which is often seen as an allegory on the war with Japan, and Song of China (1935), a glorification of traditional values that was part of the New Life Movement. Later, Song of China became one of the few films that had a limited release in the United States.

Fei's legacy as one of China's greatest directors was sealed with Spring in a Small Town (1948) about a love triangle in post-war China (it was later remade by Tian Zhuangzhuang in 2002 as Springtime in a Small Town). Director Wong Kar-wai called him the only film poet he knew in China. In 2005, Spring in a Small Town was declared the greatest Chinese film ever made by the Hong Kong Film Critics Society. Fei remained active in this so-called "Second Golden Age" and also directed China's first color film A Wedding in the Dream (1948), which incorporated Beijing Opera and starred Mei Lanfang. Following the Communist revolution in 1949, Fei Mu, along with many other artists and intellectuals fled to Hong Kong. There he founded Longma Film Company (Dragon-Horse Films) with Zhu Shilin and Fei Luyi and produced (under the Longma name) Zhu Shilin's The Flower Girl (1951).

Following his death from a heart attack in Hong Kong in 1951 while working at his desk, Fei Mu and his work temporarily fell into obscurity, as much of his filmography was forgotten or ignored on the mainland and rejected by leftists as indicative of rightist ideologies. It was not until the 1980s, when the China Film Archive re-opened after being closed down during the Cultural Revolution, that Fei Mu's work found a new audience. Most significant was a new print made by the China Film Archive from the original negative of Spring in a Small Town.

== Filmography ==
=== Director ===
Year	English title	Chinese title	Notes
1933	Night in the City	城市之夜	Also known as City Nights; silent
1934	A Sea of Fragrant Snow	香雪海	Also known as A Nun's Love; silent
1934	Life	人生	Silent
1935	Song of China	天倫	Also known as Filial Piety; co-directed with Luo Mingyou
1936	Blood on Wolf Mountain	狼山喋血記	Also known as Bloodbath in Langshan and Bloodbath on Wolf Mountain
1937	Martyrs of the Northern Front	北戰場精忠錄	Chinese opera film
1937	Gold-Plated City	鍍金的城	Also known as the Gilded City; Chinese opera film
1937	Murder in the Oratory	斬經堂	Chinese opera film
1937	Nightmares in Spring Chamber	夢斷春閨	Episode in Lianhua Symphony
1940	Confucius	孔夫子	Thought lost, rediscovered in 2001
1941	Children of the World	世界兒女	Co-directed with Jacob Fleck and Luise Fleck
1941	The Beauty	國色天香	
1941	Songs of Ancient China	古中國之歌	Chinese opera film
1948	The Little Cowheard	小放牛	Chinese opera film
1948	A Wedding in the Dream	生死恨	First Chinese color film; also known as Happiness in neither Life nor Death; Chinese opera film
1948	Spring in a Small Town	小城之春	

=== Screenwriter ===
Year	English title	Chinese title
1934	Life	人生
1936	Blood on Wolf Mountain	狼山喋血記
1936	On Stage and Backstage	前台与後台
1937	Martyrs of the Northern Front	北戰場精忠錄
1937	Nightmares in Spring Chamber	夢斷春閨
1940	Confucius	孔夫子
1941	Children of the World	世界兒女
1941	Songs of Ancient China	古中國之歌

=== Producer ===
Year	English title	Chinese title
1951	The Flower Girl	花姑娘

== See also ==
- Lianhua Film Company
