= A Wedding in the Dream =

- Poster
- Traditional Chinese: 生死恨
- Simplified Chinese: 生死恨
- Hanyu Pinyin: Shēngsǐ hèn
- Directed by: Fei Mu
- Written by: Mei Lanfang; Qi Rushan
- Starring: Mei Lanfang
- Cinematography: Li Shengwei
- Edited by: Wei Chunbao
- Production company: Yihua Film Company
- Release date: January 30, 1948 (China)
- Running time: 62 minutes
- Country: China
- Language: Mandarin

A Wedding in the Dream (Chinese: 生死恨; pinyin: Shēngsǐ hèn) is a 1948 Chinese Peking opera film directed by Fei Mu and is considered China's first color film. It starred and was co-written by Mei Lanfang, one of the century's best-known Chinese opera singers. The film is also known as Happiness Neither in Life Nor in Death and Remorse at Death.
