= Movie Town Haikou =

Tourist attraction in Hainan, China

Coordinates: 19.921723°N 110.343665°E

Movie Town Haikou 海口电影公社

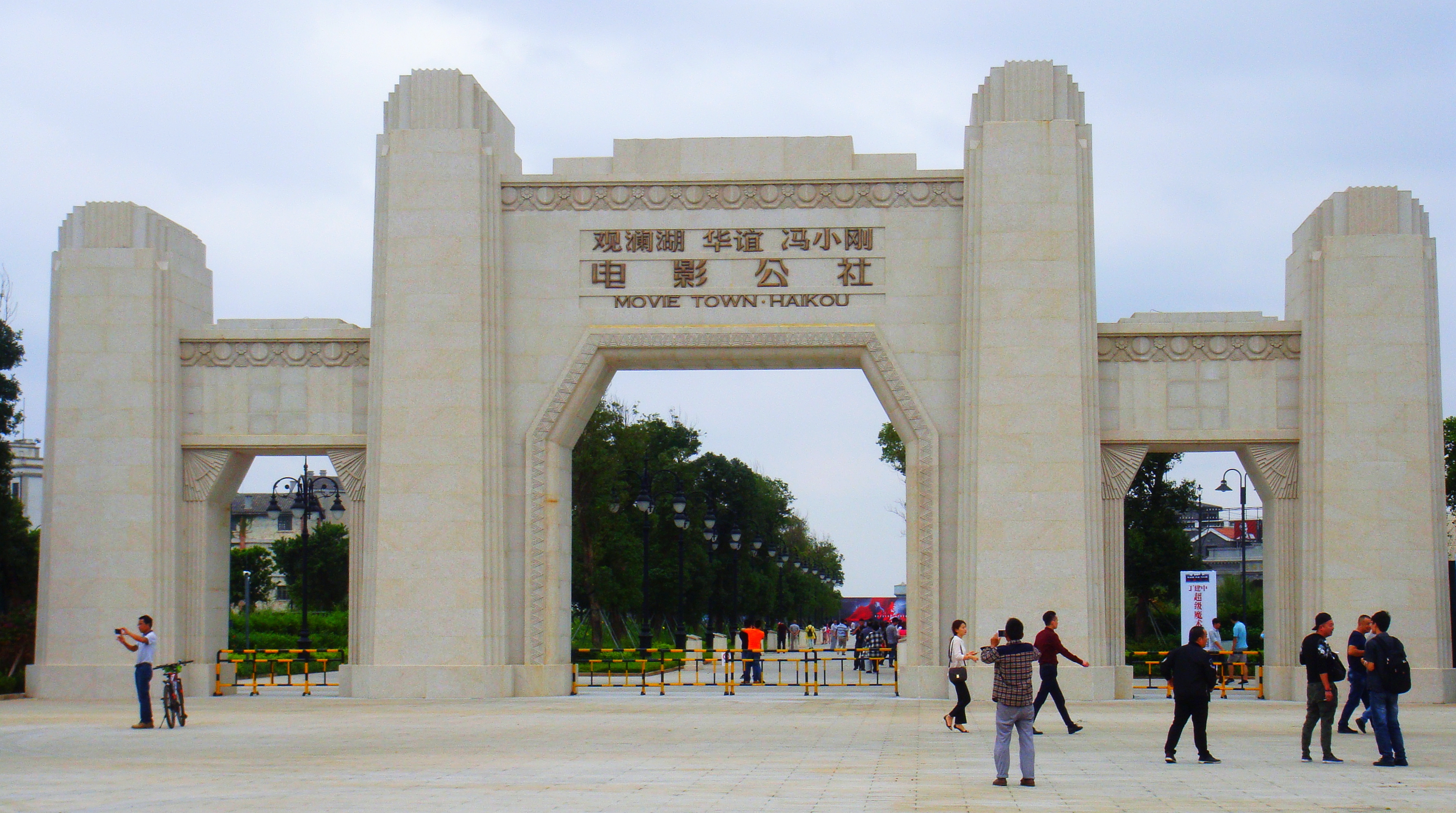
- Front entrance
- Formation: 2013
- Location: Haikou, Hainan Province, China
- Website: Official website

Movie Town Haikou (Chinese: 海口电影公社) is an artificial town, movie studios, guest apartments, and administration buildings, approximately 8 km south of Haikou, Hainan, China. The town, located beside Mission Hills Haikou golf resort, was created as a movie and television filming location and tourist attraction. Some of the buildings still under construction are the town buildings and the movie studios with accompanying filming facilities.

The town opened on December 29, 2013, and was expected to be completed in 2014. As of May 2015 construction continues. It is a joint venture between Feng Xiaogang and Huayi Brothers Media Group.

== Town ==
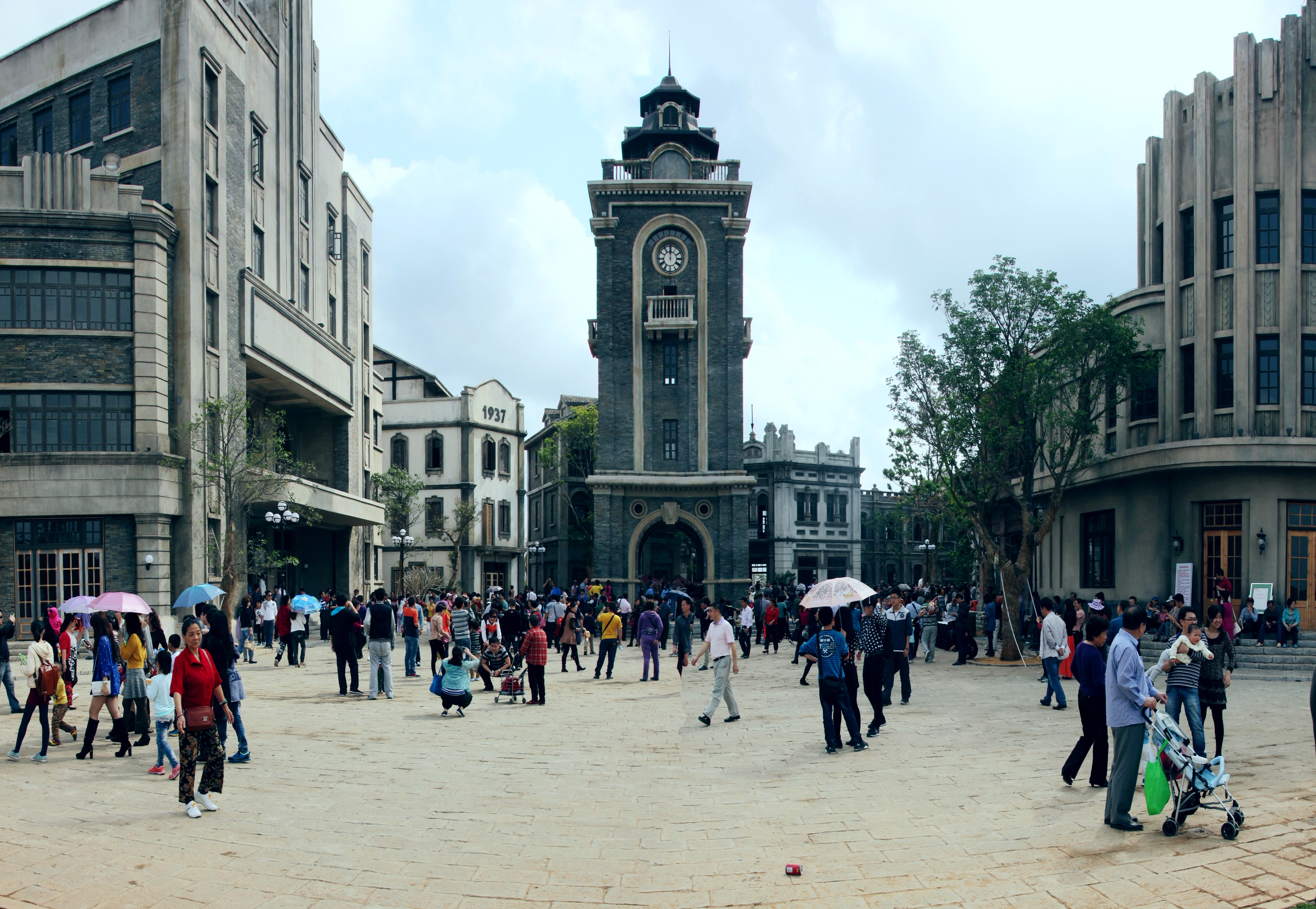
The town's "Church and Square" area

The entire site is 1,400 acres containing 96 buildings along streets with such names as Socialism Street and Nanyang Street. Parts of the area were designed to resemble scenes from the film Back to 1942.

Areas within the town include:

- 1942 Street - contains 91 buildings built to appear like those in the Republican Era in Chongqing. They include Chiang Kai-shek's residence, the Xishan Bell Tower, Chongqing Cathay Theatre, and the Shanghai Rong Guang Theatre.
- Nanyang Street - a 300-metre-long street with 70 buildings
- Traditional Beijing Street - built in the style of Beijing in the 1950s to 1960s
- Church and Square - This area is built to resemble European cities.
- Park View Area - This area's buildings were designed to resemble those in Feng Xiaogang's Hesui movies, such as If You Are the One, Aftershock, The Banquet (2006 film), and A World Without Thieves
- Avenue of Stars - This tourist street displays autographs of 80 Chinese and international celebrities.

== Studios ==
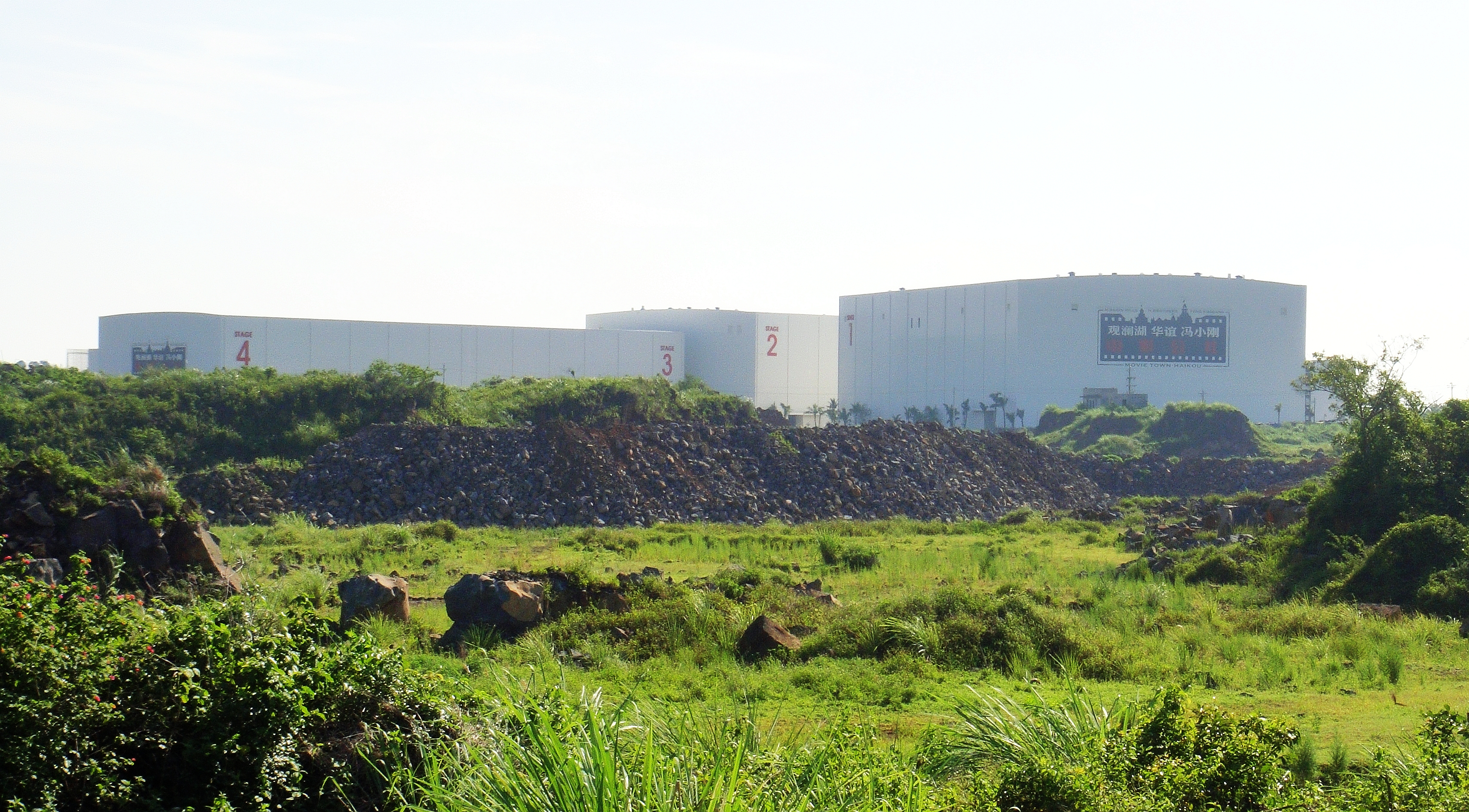
Studios

Around half a kilometre to the east are the four studios. They comprise three, large, white buildings with one building housing both studio 3 and 4. The total area of the studios is 8,000 square metres.
