= Chinese cinema in Nigeria =

Starting in the 1950s, China began focusing on Africa as an audience for their films. Combined with the emergence of Nollywood, Chinese cinema in Nigeria encompasses a wide variety of industries, from Chinese language films, to Chinese companies, to the Chinese bootleg black market. Through the film industry, China has attempted to create closer cultural ties with Nigeria, as in other African countries. This has been attempted by film festivals, cooperative institutes and forums, and Chinese distribution companies focusing on an African audience.

== History ==
In 1903, the first motion pictures were screened at the Glover Memorial Hall in Lagos with the help of Nigerian nationalist Herbert Macaulay in association with the Spanish Blaboa Film Company. A few decades later, production companies such as Latola Film, which was founded in 1963, and Calpeny Nigeria Limited (1970) emerged. The Nigerian film industry developed after they gained independence in 1960. They told stories using the Yoruba traveling theater traditions. Much of the Nigerian film industry today was influenced by these theaters. The film industry branched from theater to celluloid film, which was introduced by the British during colonialism.

Filmmakers who pioneered the production of films in Nigeria were Ola Baloun, Adeyemi Afolayan, Frances Oldele, Hubert Orgunde, and Eddie Ugbomah. Their contributions helped increase the demand for films in the 1970s, and simultaneously Nigeria was experiencing an economic boom and the availability of movie theaters. However, the challenges they faced came with the devaluation of the Nigerian naira, which inhibited access to celluloid film equipment, and movie theaters became inaccessible.

Wider availability of Nigerian films started in 1992, with access to video home systems. This happened due to the successful movie Living in Bondage by Kenneth Nnebue, which was credited with influencing the video film industry. In the 1990s, the Nigerian film industry became Nollywood, which encompasses films in the English language, Yoruba, Igbo, Hausa, and other languages spoken in Nigeria. Nollywood is the second-largest film industry after India's Bollywood. The film industry produces close to 2,500 films a year, and the country gained a revenue of $600 million in 2010. The video industry flourished in Nigeria and all over Africa, as it cut costs for film producers. Nollywood films became popular in Nigeria due to the content that addressed issues relevant to the sociopolitical climate of the country.

Since the 1950s, China has been in collaboration and assistance to African governments, including within the film industry, as China became one of the biggest film markets in 2018 which aided them in funding film productions on the African continent.

Starting in the 1960s, Chinese films began circulating in Africa. In the 1970s kung fu films, especially those starring Bruce Lee, experienced a sharp rise in popularity. In addition, themes like family, marriage, legends, and science fiction and TV shows which depicted China's development became popular in Nigeria. One example is the TV series, Minning Town which shows the transition of impoverished workers to the richer Xihaigu region. The TV series was showcased in Hausa and was popular in Northern Nigeria due to regional similarities and underdevelopment. With the growing popularity of Chinese films in Nigeria, many film companies wanted to collaborate and work alongside China to expand the Nollywood industry.

The China Cultural Center in Abuja also increased their Chinese-Nigerian cultural exchange. Due to the rise in collaboration, more than 3,000 Nigerians were promised to be sent to China for training to boost the Nigerian art and film sector.

== Distribution of films ==
In 2002 StarTimes began expanding its broadcasting to Africa. It's Nigerian branch was launched on July 29, 2010. It partnered with state broadcaster Nigerian Television Authority, NTA, controlling 70% of the partnership. Though it was successful, a StarTimes Nigeria employee once opined that "60% of subscribers are there only because it's cheap." The affordability of StarTimes in Nigeria, reduced the cost of pay for TV, which in turn, helped lower-class people get access to good quality content. StarTimes also expanded by creating channels dedicated to broadcasting Nigerian films, and translating and dubbing Chinese shows into languages such as Hausa and Yoruba. Its first series, Alagbara, was produced with a majority of cast and crew from the Theatre Arts and Movie Practitioners Association of Nigeria, TAMPAN.

In 2018 StarTimes began producing its own content. These were first launched in Nigeria before becoming available to other African countries.

== Cinematic collaboration ==
The first film that signified a cinematic collaboration between China and Nigeria was 30 Days in China, planned to come out in 2020. In 2019, Huahua Media and Nigerian comedian Ayo Makun agreed to produce Makun's third film in his series that details his trips to foreign countries. The film is supposed to include both Chinese and Nigerian actors, with Makun (popularly known as AY) holding the largest role. 30 Days in China was set to be filmed on location in China, in facilities provided by Huahua Media.

The president of Huahua Media, Kefei Wang, refers to this collaboration as having a positive impact on the quality of films that the two countries can create, due to the amount of talent present in the Nigerian cinema scene. One co-founder of the Nigerian-based film production company FilmOne Entertainment, Moses Babatope, also celebrates the beginning of Chinese-Nigerian collaboration due to the immense size of the Chinese film market, and also notes that he believes that Chinese-Nigerian collaboration will produce better films. Ayo Makun also lauded the cinematic collaboration of the two countries as bringing Nigerian cinema to a global audience and spreading its influence via the large Chinese market. Some predict that this collaboration between Ayo Makun and Huahua Media will lead to further cinematic collaboration between China and Nigeria in the future.

However, it is unclear whether or not 30 Days in China was ever released, or if its release date has been revised. The film is missing from Ayo Makun's filmography on IMDb and other sites, even though it shows he has undertaken projects since 2020.

== Film festivals ==
In August 2023 Lagos hosted a Chinese film festival, which lasted for five days. Attendees included members of the Chinese consulate, CPC members, various members of the Nigerian federal government, people who work in business, teachers, and students. During the opening speech Yan Yuqing, the head of the Chinese consulate in Lagos, stressed film as a point of connection between Nigeria and China. One of the festival's goals was to provide Nigerians with a way of understanding and engaging with Chinese culture and history by increasing the presence of Chinese film. The festival also featured performances by the China National Traditional Orchestra, and the Huaxing Arts Troop Nigeria, which showcased traditional Nigerian dance, furthering the artistic connections between the two countries. The Lagos festival also seeks to emulate the goals of the Chinese Global Civilization Initiative by allowing "people-to-people" cultural exchange between Chinese and Nigerians, which might also lead to future festivals of Chinese film in Africa and of African film in China.

From May 25 to 31 2024 StarTimes Nigeria, in collaboration with the Chinese Embassy, launched a film festival in Abuja. During the festival multiple highly-grossing Chinese films were shown, and StarTimes was promoted as a streaming service. The films shown on StarTimes are sometimes dubbed into Hausa or Yoruba to provide a more comfortable viewing experience for Nigerians. Joshua Wang, CEO of StarTimes, said that "[t]he festival is a celebration of the deep-rooted friendship between China and Nigeria." Li Xu Da, Cultural Counselor of the Chinese Embassy in Nigeria, stressed the possibility of China as a market for Nigerian films. Another goal of the festival was to provide Nigerians with direct perspectives on what contemporary Chinese culture is like, furthering the friendship between the two nations on the level of the citizens themselves.

== Piracy ==
The selling of bootlegs and pirated films has become popular in outdoor markets in Lagos. These DVDs are often translated into local languages, either through subtitling or dubbing, before being sold. Chinese films dubbed over remain the most popularly sold genre. Debate has formed as to the damage of piracy, with some experts claiming piracy allows access to a wider range of foreign films. Others point to a loss in revenue, with studios forced to sell their official DVDs at a significantly marked down price.

== International relations through film ==
China and Africa, in part because they comprise a large portion of the world's population, have many economic and political motivations to maintain a strong relationship. Nigeria, as the second largest film industry in the world in terms of content produced, is sometimes seen as acting as a representative for all of Africa, so China and other countries can seek to engage with Nigeria as a way of interacting with wider Africa. The Nigerian film industry is also the second largest employer in the country, and so it wields significant economic power by creating jobs and contributing to the Nigerian GDP, thus increasing its diplomatic significance. By facilitating the screening of Chinese movies in Nigeria, China can present positive impressions of Chinese people and culture to Africans, creating a friendlier atmosphere for diplomacy. These films can also help ease tensions and misunderstandings caused by linguistic, cultural, and technological differences between China and African countries by providing more nuanced portrayals of their respective cultures. According to Joshua Wong, the CEO of StarTimes, actual cinematic collaboration between Chinese and Nigerians could have a positive cultural impact as well, due to the opportunity for the two cultures to find similarities and common values and celebrate them on film.

Engaging with other nations via film and film screenings can be seen as an example of one of China's international strategies, i.e. working on the ground on a small scale in other countries and putting emphasis on cultural understanding. By showing interest in the culture and people of Nigeria and other African countries through film, China can both create a foundation for future diplomacy and have more control over how Chinese culture and people are perceived in other countries through the popularity and joy of movies and TV. This combats the Chinese fear that the only contact Africans have with China is through low quality imported goods.

== Nigerian receptions of Chinese films ==
For some Nigerians, the most significant way that they learn about Chinese culture is through Chinese movies. In interviews conducted by China Daily and published in 2020, five Nigerians of various backgrounds discussed why they enjoyed the Chinese films. One of the reasons included was that Chinese movies helped them to be more accepting of other cultures by showing viewers aspects of Chinese culture they were unfamiliar with and found interesting. Others cited an increased interest in Chinese culture, food, storytelling, and martial arts as a result of Chinese movies they had seen. Another theme was that some Nigerians found the values presented in the movies compelling, like love for one's country and pride in oneself.
