= China Film Stellar =

Chinese movie theater chain

- Native name: 中影星美院線有限公司
- Industry: Film
- Headquarters: China

China Film Stellar (Chinese: 中影星美院線有限公司) is a Chinese movie theater chain. In 2014, it was the second largest cinema chain in China by box office gross, with US$393.35 million. In 2015, it was again the second largest chain by box office gross, with US$575 million, representing 8.5% of the market.
